= Yin Changsheng =

Renowned Taoist immortal during Eastern Han dynasty

Chinese name
- Traditional Chinese: 陰長生
- Simplified Chinese: 阴长生
- Literal meaning: "Long-life Yin"
Transcriptions
Standard Mandarin
- Hanyu Pinyin: Yīn chángshēng
- Wade–Giles: Yin Ch'ang-sheng
Yue: Cantonese
- Jyutping: Jam^{1} Coeng^{4}sang^{1}
Middle Chinese
- Middle Chinese: ʔIm Drjangsræng
Old Chinese
- Baxter–Sagart (2014): Qum Cə-[N]-traŋsreŋ

Korean name
- Hangul: 음장생
- Hanja: 陰長生
Transcriptions
- McCune–Reischauer: Ŭm Changsaeng

Japanese name
- Kanji: 陰長生
- Hiragana: いん ちょうせい
Transcriptions
- Revised Hepburn: In Chōsei

Yin Changsheng (Chinese: 陰長生; trans. "Long-life Yin", fl. AD 120–210) was a famous Daoist xian ("transcendent; immortal") from Xinye who lived during the Eastern Han dynasty (25-220 CE). After serving more than ten years as a disciple of the transcendent Maming Sheng ("Horse-neigh Sheng") he received the secret Taiqing (太清; "Great Clarity") scriptures on Waidan ("External Alchemy"). Several extant texts are ascribed to Yin Changsheng, such as the Jinbi wu xianglei can tong qi (金碧五相類參同契; "The Five Categories of Metals and Minerals in the Cantong qi").

== Names ==
Yin Changsheng's name combines the rare Chinese surname Yīn (陰; "shade; dark; female principle—i.e., yin in yin-yang") with the common word chángshēng (長生; "long life, longevity; eternal life").

Changsheng occurs in other Daoist names, such as the courtesy name of the deity Guan Yu. Fan Changsheng (范長生; "Long-life Fan", d. 318) was a Daoist leader in Sichuan and Chancellor of the Cheng Han state, who was later regarded as one of the Eight Immortals from Sichuan. Changsheng Dadi (長生大帝, "Great Emperor of Long Life") is one of Nine Monarchs in the pantheon of the Shenxiao (神霄; "Divine Empyrean") school of Daoism. The Changsheng guan (長生館; "Abbey of Long Life") is located in Yizhen, Jiangsu.

Yin Changsheng (陰長生) is sometimes confused with another transcendent named Yin Sheng (陰生). The c. 2nd century CE Liexian zhuan ("Biographies of Immortals") says Yin Sheng impersonated a beggar boy in the marketplace of Chang'an, but every time angry merchants "bespattered him with filth". his clothing magically became clean. When word of this reached the authorities, they threw Yin Sheng into prison and threatened him with execution. As he left the capital, the houses of all the people who had besmirched him collapsed, killing dozens.

The c. 370 Housheng daojun lieji (後聖道君列紀; "Chronicle of the Lord of the Dao, Saint of the Latter Age") refers to Maming Sheng as Ma Ming (馬鳴) and Yin Changsheng as Yin Sheng (陰生), listing them among those transcendents who descend to earth and give instructions.

Some Daoist texts below refer to Yin Changsheng with the honorific jun (君; "lord; sir"), such as Yin jun (陰君; "Lord Yin") in the Book of Jin, Xinye Yin jun (新野陰君; "Lord Yin of Xinye") in the Baopuzi, or Yin zhenjun (陰真君; "True Lord Yin") in the Yin zhenjun jinshi wu xianglei.

== Hagiographies ==
Yin Changsheng is "one of the best-known immortals" of the Taoist tradition. The primary source of information about Yin is his hagiography in the Shenxian zhuan ("Biographies of Divine Transcendents"), which is traditionally attributed to the Taoist scholar Ge Hong (283-343). The Shenxian zhuan scholar and translator Robert Ford Campany identified the earliest dates by which various parts of the text are attested, and concluded that the Yin Changsheng material is reliably attributed by the year 500.

Yin Changsheng ("Long-Life Yin"), a native of Xinye [in present-day Henan], was related to a Latter Han empress. He was born into a rich and highly placed family, but he had no fondness for glory and honor, instead devoting himself exclusively to the cultivation of arts of the Tao. Having heard that Master Horseneigh [Maming sheng] possessed a Way to transcend the world [dushi 度世], Yin sought him out, and eventually obtained an audience. Yin served Horseneigh as if he were Horseneigh's servant, personally performing menial tasks for him. But Horseneigh did not teach him his Way of world-transcendence; he merely singled him out for lofty conversations on current affairs and principles of agriculture. This went on for over ten years. But Yin did not give up. During this same time, there were twelve others who served Horseneigh; but they all quit and went home, and only Yin kept up his behavior without flagging. Finally Horseneigh declared to him: "You truly are capable of obtaining the Way."

So he took Yin out to Green Citadel Mountain. There Horseneigh decocted yellow earth to make gold, as a sign to him. Then he raised an altar facing west and bestowed on Yin the Scripture on the Divine Elixir of Great Clairty (Taiqing shendan jing 太清神丹經). Having done this, Master Horseneigh said farewell and departed.

Yin Changsheng went back and synthesized the elixir. When it was complete, he took only half a dose so as not to immediately finish the process of ascending to Heaven. He fashioned several hundred thousand catties of gold so as to distribute it to the destitute of the world without regard to whether he knew them personally. He traveled all around the world, with his wife and children in tow; his whole family all achieved longevity without aging. He was among humans for over three hundred years before finally, to the east of Level Metropolis Mountain, ascending to Heaven in broad daylight and departing.

He wrote a book in nine chapters which stated: "In upper antiquity, there were many transcendents, so many that they cannot all be accounted for. But since the rise of the Han, only forty-five persons have attained transcendence—forty-six counting myself. Twenty of them did so via [尸解仙] 'escape by means of a simulated corpse,' the rest all ascended to Heaven in broad daylight.".

So-called grotto-heavens were sacred Taoist sites in mountains. Yin Changsheng received the Taiqing alchemical scripture from Master Maming on Mount Qingcheng (Sichuan) and compounded the elixir on Mount Wudang (Hubei), which are two of the Four Sacred Mountains of Taoism. He finally ascended to Heaven from Mount Pingdu (Pingdu shan 平度山, Sichuan). According to Tao Hongjing's 6th-century Zhenlingweiye tu (真靈位業圖; "Chart of the Ranks and Functions of the Perfected Immortals"), which was the first Taoist work about theogony, Yin Shangsheng now dwells in the heaven of Great Clarity (Taiqing 太清).

Rather than a lifespan of over 300 years, some later versions of Yin Chang's hagiography say 170 years. For instance, the c. 921 Xianyuan bianzhu (仙苑編珠; "Paired Pearls from the Garden of Immortals") by the Tang Taoist monk Wang Songnian (王松年) says, "He was among humans for one hundred seventy years and his complexion remained like that of a young girl. After writing a scripture on elixirs (danjing) in nine chapters, he ascended into Heaven in broad daylight.".

Some sources record that Yin Changsheng was the teacher of the Taoist Bao Jing (d. c. 330 CE), the father-in-law of Ge Hong. According to one tradition, around 318, Bao began to receive instruction from Master Yin, who gave him the Taixuan Yin Sheng fu (太玄隂生符; "Yin Sheng's Talisman of Great Mystery"), a supernatural Daoist talisman enabling adepts to achieve shijie ("release from the corpse"), which was a method of feigning death and assuming a new identity as an earthbound transcendent. The c. 648 Book of Jin biography of Bao Jing says, "Jing once met the transcendent Lord Yin, who transmitted instructions of the Tao to him. He died at an age of over one hundred.". These accounts attest Yin Changsheng's familiarity with Taoist traditions from the southeastern region of Jiangnan.

Ge Hong's c. 320 Baopuzi ("[Book of the] Master Who Embraces Simplicity") mentions Yin Changsheng in three Inner Chapters, depicting him as one of the legendary founders of the Taoist Taiqing legacy, together with Anqi Sheng and Maming Sheng.

One alchemical chapter giving detailed instructions for fabricating the Taiqing shendan (太清神丹; "Divine Elixir of Great Clarity") includes a hagiography of Yin Changsheng.

In recent times, at the end of the [Latter] Han, Lord Yin of Xinye synthesized this Grand Purity Elixir and thereby attained transcendence. He was originally a Confucian scholar and a talented intellect, and excelled at verse. He then wrote an appraisal of and preface to [an?] alchemical scripture (danjing 丹經), setting forth the details of his early studies of the Tao and his experience of following his teacher, enumerating over forty persons of whom he was aware who had attained transcendence, all with precision and clarity.

In comparison with Yin Changsheng's longer Shenxian zhuan hagiography, the Baopuzi calls him Xinye Yin jun (新野陰君; "Lord Yin of Xinye"), describes him as a "Confucian", and omits the origin and title of his "alchemical scripture".

The subsequent context details how to make this Taiqing elixir, which is said to be "somewhat more difficult" than other cinnabar potions, but it is a "superior method for mounting to heaven in broad daylight"—a standard Taoist figure of speech. The alchemical ingredients are "fortified vinegar, red crystal salt, calomel, 'dark-white' (a mixture of lead, gold, and mercury), Express Amulets, and Three-Five Divine Solution". The Taiqing elixir can be transmutated from one to nine times, differentiated by their speeds of efficacy; in order to attain immortality, an adept needs to consume a once transmutated elixir for three years, and a nine times transmutated elixir for three days.

Two additional Baopuzi contexts refer to Long-life Yin. One records that "in former times", he and three other transcendents "all took half doses of Gold Liquor. They remained in the world, some for as long as a thousand years, and only then departed". The other describes him as an exemplar of perseverance, alluding to his lengthy disciplehood under Maming Sheng, Yin Changsheng "effected the highest type of divine process by personally advancing while others withdrew."

== Texts ==
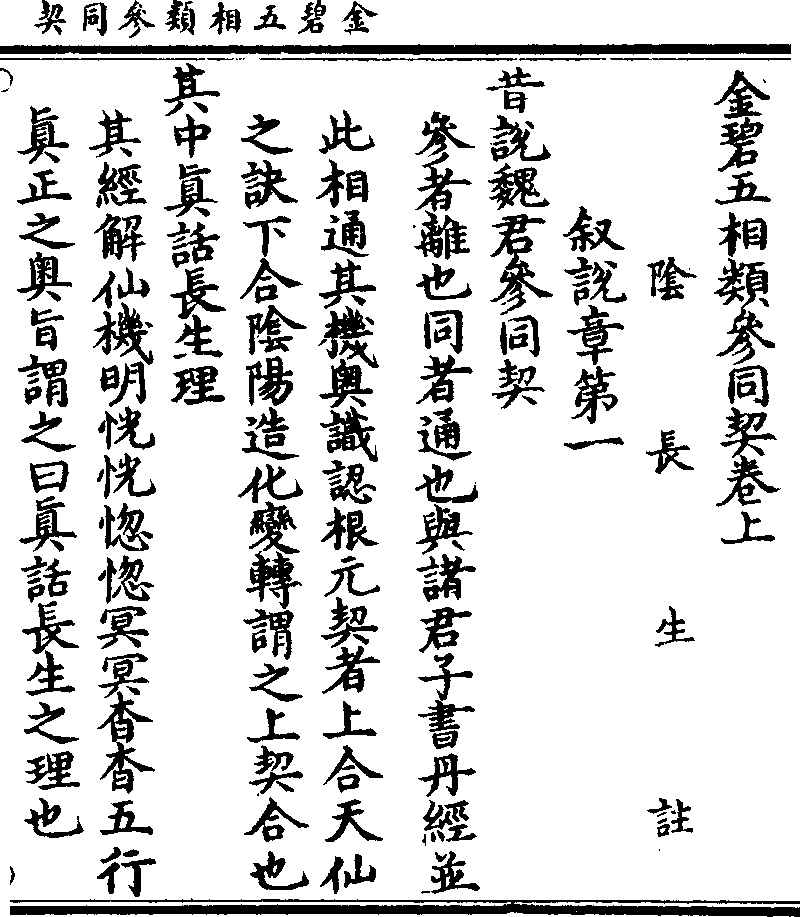
First page of Yin Changsheng's Jinbi wu xianglei can tong qi (金碧五相類參同契; "The Five Categories of Metals and Minerals in the Cantong qi"), Ming dynasty 1445 Zhengtong daozang (正統道藏) edition.

The received Daoist Canon contains three texts ascribed to Yin Changsheng, two of which concern the Zhouyi Cantong Qi ("The Kinship of the Three, in Accordance with the Book of Changes"), the earliest book on Chinese alchemy, supposedly written by Wei Boyang in the 2nd century.

Yin's first text, dating from the Six Dynasties (222-589), is the second chapter of the Taiqing jinye shendan jing (太清金液神丹經; "Great Clarity Scripture on the Divine Elixir of Potable Gold").

The Jinbi wu xianglei can tong qi (金碧五相類參同契; "The Five Categories of Metals and Minerals in the Cantong qi"), or Yin zhenjun jinshi wu xianglei (陰真君金碧五相類; "The Five Categories of Metals and Minerals, by the True Lord Yin") was compiled during the Tang dynasty (618-907), essentially consists of an "annotated chemical lexicon".

The main work bearing Yin Changsheng's name is a c. 700 commentary to the Zhouyi cantong qi. Its content is distinguished by a cosmological interpretation of the scripture, but occasional references to actual practices, such as ingesting a small quantity of the elixir, show that it originated in a waidan alchemical context.
