= Maming Sheng =

Han dynasty Taoist alchemist and xian

Chinese name
- Traditional Chinese: 馬鳴生
- Simplified Chinese: 马鸣生
- Literal meaning: "Master Horse-neigh"
Transcriptions
Standard Mandarin
- Hanyu Pinyin: Mǎmíng shēng
- Wade–Giles: Ma-ming sheng
Yue: Cantonese
- Jyutping: Maa^{5}ming^{4}sang^{1}
Middle Chinese
- Middle Chinese: MæXmjæng sræng
Old Chinese
- Baxter–Sagart (2014): Mˁraʔm.reŋ sreŋ

Korean name
- Hangul: 마명생
- Hanja: 馬鳴生
Transcriptions
- McCune–Reischauer: Mamyŏng saeng

Japanese name
- Kanji: 馬鳴生
- Hiragana: めみょうせい
Transcriptions
- Revised Hepburn: Memyō sei

Maming Sheng (Chinese: 馬鳴生 "Master Horse-neigh", fl. c. 100 CE) was a legendary Han dynasty Daoist alchemist and xian ("transcendent; immortal"). He was a disciple of the transcendent and fangshi ("master of methods") Anqi Sheng, who transmitted a secret waidan external alchemical scripture to him. Maming refined this elixir of immortality, but rather than take a full dose and immediately ascend to heaven, he only took half and lived for over 500 years as a secret dìxiān (地仙; "earthbound transcendent"). Master Horse-neigh was a key figure in the Daoist Taiqing (太清; "Grand Purity") alchemical tradition. Furthermore, in Chinese Buddhism, Maming (馬鳴; "Horse-neigh") translates the name of the 2nd-century CE Indian Buddhist monk and polymath Aśvaghoṣa (from Sanskrit áśva अश्व, "horse" and ghoṣa घोष, "cry; sound"), so-called because when teaching the Dharma his words were intelligible even to animals.

== Names ==
The Chinese appellation Maming Sheng ("Master Horse-neigh") combines the courtesy title shēng (生; "master; sir") with mǎmíng (馬鳴; 'horse cry/sound'; "neigh; whinny; nicker; whicker"). Some later texts write Maming Sheng as 馬明生; "Master Horse-bright" with the variant Chinese character míng (明; "bright; clear") instead of míng (鳴; "cry; sound"). Since Ma (馬) is a common Chinese surname, a few scholars parse the name 馬鳴生 as "Ma Mingsheng" instead of "Maming Sheng"). The following Shenxian zhuan hagiography of Maming Sheng says his surname was He (和) and original name was Junxian (君賢).

== Hagiographies ==
Maming Sheng is known primarily from two hagiographies in the Shenxian zhuan ("Biographies of Divine Transcendents"), which is traditionally attributed to the Daoist scholar Ge Hong (283-343), one is for Maming Sheng himself and the other hagiography is for his disciple Yin Changsheng (陰長生, Long-Life Yin, see below). The Shenxian zhuan scholar and translator Robert Ford Campany identified the earliest dates by which various parts of the text are attested, and concluded that the Yin Changsheng material is reliably attributed by the year 500 and the Maming Sheng material by 650.

The Shenxian zhuan hagiography of Maming Sheng says his original name was He Junxian (和君賢) and he came from Linzi (modern-day Linzi District, Shandong).

Master Horseneigh was a native of Linzi. His original surname was He 和, and his given name was Junxian 君賢. When he was young, he served as a district-level lictor, rounding up bandits, and he was once injured by a bandit and temporarily died. But he suddenly encountered a divine person on the road, and this Person gave him medicines and saved him, bringing him back to life. Master Horseneigh had nothing with which to repay this divine person, so he quit his office and followed him. So it was that he took Master An Qi as his teacher, following him all over the world and enduring all manner of hardships for many years so as to prepare himself to receive scriptures. At first he merely wanted methods for making gold; only later did he realize that there was a Way of long life. He followed An Qi for a long time, carrying his writings for him. To the west they reached Nuji Mountain; to the north, Xuandu; to the south, Lujiang. An Qi finally bestowed on him two alchemical scriptures, the Grand Purity and the Gold Liquor. He entered mountains and refined the medicine. When it was completed, he took only half the dose, as he took no delight in ascending to Heaven but preferred to become an earthbound transcendent. He traveled about through the nine provinces for over five hundred years, no one realizing that he was a transcendent, as he built himself a house and raised animals just like ordinary people, moving every three years or so. People did wonder at his nonaging, however. Then [one day] he ascended to Heaven in broad daylight.

Campany translates this textual name Taiqing jinye danjing as two Taiqing texts "Scripture on [the Elixir of] Grand Purity" and the "Scripture on the [Divine] Elixir of Gold Liquor", but also notes it is translatable as one "Taiqing Scripture on Gold Liquor". Instead of Maming living for over five centuries, some texts say one century. Another source gives the revealed text's name as the Taiyang shendan jing (太陽神丹經; "Scripture of the Divine Elixirs of Great Yang").

The Shenxianzhuan biography of Yin Changsheng gives additional information about Master Horseneigh:

Yin Changsheng ("Long-Life Yin"), a native of Xinye, was related to a Latter Han empress. He was born into a rich and highly placed family, but he had no fondness for glory and honor, instead devoting himself exclusively to the cultivation of arts of the Dao. Having heard that Master Horseneigh [Maming sheng] possessed a Way to transcend the world [度世; dushi], Yin sought him out, and eventually obtained an audience. Yin treated Horseneigh as if he were Horseneigh's servant, personally performing menial tasks for him. But Horseneigh did not teach him his Way of world-transcendence; he merely singled him out for lofty conversations on current affairs and principles of agriculture. This went on for over ten years. But Yin did not give up. During this same time, there were twelve others who served Horseneigh; but they all quit and went home, and only Yin kept up his behavior without flagging. Finally Horseneigh declared to him: "You truly are capable of obtaining the Way."

So he took Yin out to Green Citadel Mountain. There Horseneigh decocted yellow earth to make gold, as a sign to him. Then he raised an altar facing west and bestowed on Yin the "Scripture on the Divine Elixir of Grand Purity" (太清神丹經; Taiqing shendan jing). Having done this, Master Horseneigh said farewell and departed.

Yin Changsheng went back and synthesized the elixir. When it was complete, he took only half a dose so as not to immediately finish the process of ascending to Heaven. He fashioned several hundred thousand catties of gold so as to distribute it to the destitute of the world without regard to whether he knew them personally. He traveled all around the world, with his wife and children in tow; his whole family all achieved longevity without aging. He was among humans for over three hundred years before finally, to the east of Level Metropolis Mountain, ascending to Heaven in broad daylight and departing.

For this "Green Citadel Mountain" (青城山; Qingcheng shan), Mount Qingcheng (Dujiangyan City, Sichuan), some other sources give Qingtian shan (青天山; "Green Heaven Mountain").

Besides the two Shenxianzhuan hagiographies, another set of traditions about Maming Sheng began to be recorded in the early 6th century. The c. 1029 Yunji Qiqian anthology of the Daoist canon contains a text of uncertain date and provenance, the Maming sheng zhenren zhuan (馬明生真人傳; "Hagiography of the Perfected Person Maming Sheng")—writing his name with míng (明; "bright") instead of míng (鳴; "cry; sound"). This account contains additional details not attested earlier, such as Maming's rescuer and year of death. It identified the "divine person on the road" who saved his life as Taizhen furen (太清夫人; "Lady of Grand Perfection"), named Wan (婉) and styled Bosui (勃遂), who was a high court official in the Three Heavens administration. Since his patroness was too exalted to teach Maming Sheng directly, she arranged for him to study under Anqi Sheng and thus receive a method for "ascending to the heavens in broad daylight". Maming learns the method of Taiqing jinye danjing (太清金液丹經; "Grand Purity Scripture on the Elixir of Potable Gold"), synthesizes the elixir on Mount Huayin, follows Anqi's instruction to take only a half dose in order to not ascend into the heavens at once, whereupon "he was no different from profane people, and no one realized he was extraordinary". During the reign of Latter Han Emperor Ling (168-189 CE), Grand Mentor Hu Guang (胡廣) heard that Maming had obtained the Dao, and inquired about the future of the dynasty—all of his predictions were eventually confirmed. Later, when people started wondering about why Maming Sheng never seemed to age, in 180 or 181 CE (third year of the Guanghe 光和 era) he took the other half dose of the Daoist elixir and "ascended to the heavens in broad daylight".

== Ashvaghosha ==
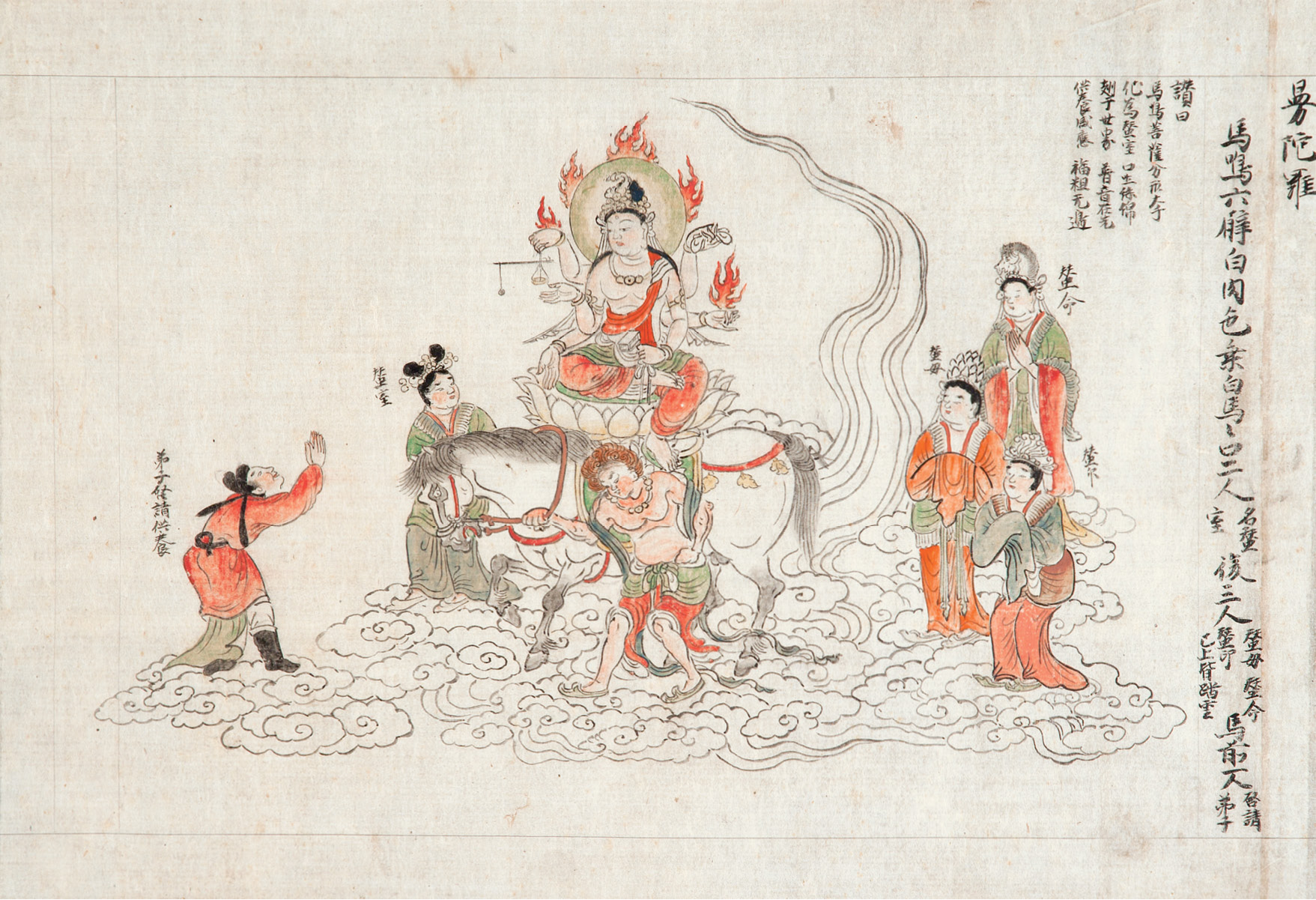
Japanese Kamakura period circa 1300 handscroll of the Bodhisattva Aśvaghoṣa riding a horse and incarnating as a silkworm

Mǎmíng (馬鳴; "horse-neigh") is the name of both the transcendent Daoist master and the Sarvastivada Buddhist monk and author Aśvaghoṣa (c. 80-c. 150 CE). The Sanskrit name Aśvaghoṣa derives from áśva (अश्व, "horse") and ghoṣa (घोष, "cry; sound"), literally meaning "Horse-neigh", in reference to a story about horses neighing after understanding the monk's skillful oratory preaching the Dharma. In Chinese Buddhism, this name is either translated as Mǎmíng or transcribed as Āshīfùjùshā (阿濕縛窶沙).

The traditional biography of Aśvaghoṣa, which Kumārajīva (344-413 CE) translated into Chinese, has a story about when he lived in a central Indian kingdom that was besieged by the king of the Kushan Empire who demanded 300,000 gold pieces in tribute. The Indian king only had 100,000 pieces, so a deal was struck for the gold, a begging bowl of the historical Buddha, and Aśvaghoṣa. However, the Kushan king's ministers questioned whether any monk could be worth 100,000 gold pieces.

The king was well aware that the wisdom of the bhikṣu was surpassing and penetrating, and that his guidance would be of immense and profound benefit. His ability as a teacher and in expounding the Dharma was such that he could influence even non-human beings. [The king] wished to remove his ministers' doubt, so he ordered that seven horses be starved for six days. At dawn on the sixth day, he gathered all of the śramaṇas of various teachings from near and far, and asked the bhikṣu to expound the Dharma. Of all those who heard him speak, none remained unenlightened. The king then tethered the horses in front of the assembly, and gave grass to them. The horses were quite fond of plavana, so he gave them plavana grass. The horses shed a tear as they listened to the Dharma, and did not consider eating for even an instant. And thus, all throughout the land it was known that [the bhikṣu] was indeed an extraordinary man. Because the horses could understand his words, he was called 'Horse Cry' (Maming 馬鳴; Aśvaghoṣa) Bodhisattva.

In Chinese Esoteric Buddhism, the Indian philosopher Nāgārjuna (c. 150 – c. 250 CE) is associated with techniques for divinations, spells, invisibility medicines, and sometimes with synthesizing Daoistic longevity-granting elixirs. The c. late 6th-century "Nāgārjuna's Treatise on the Five Sciences" (龍樹五明論; Longshu wuming lun) says it was coauthored by another Bodhisattva, Maming ("Horse-neigh"), who "appears to be a conflation" of the 2nd-century Indian author and monk Asvaghosa (Maming Pusa 馬鳴菩薩) and his contemporary, the Daoist alchemist and transcendent Master Horse-neigh (Maming Sheng 馬鳴生). Together, the Nāgārjuna/Master Horse-neigh pair were considered as authorities on medicinal and alchemical recipes, as recorded in contexts of both Chinese Buddhism and Daoist Inner Alchemy. One page in Nāgārjuna's Treatise on the Five Sciences refers to the bodhisattva with both the graphic variant names Maming (馬鳴; "Horse-neigh") and Maming (馬明; "Horse-luminescence").

During the Tang dynasty (618-907), medieval texts began to depict the Buddhist patriarch Aśvaghoṣa as a local Chinese God of silkworms and sericulture. The earliest example, the c. 801 Hongzhou school Baolin zhuan (寶林傳; "Tradition of the Baolin [Temple]") hagiography of Aśvaghoṣa records a story about him supposedly transforming into silkworms. In one of his former lives, he was reborn in Vaishali where the "people there had no clothing, and the hair growing on their bodies resembled that of horses. Although they had mouths they could not understand speech." Out of compassion for these naked "horse people", Aśvaghoṣa transformed himself into a million silkworms, ate tree leaves for ten days, and produced cocoons, which were gathered and used to produce silk clothing. When he left Vaishali to be reborn, all the horse people were overcome with emotion and cried out in grief, which is why he is "called 'Horse-neigh' (Aśvaghoṣa).". There may also have been some convergence between Aśvaghoṣa and the Wisdom King deity Hayagrīva, whose Chinese name is translated Matou Mingwang (馬頭明王; "Horse-head Wisdom King, cf. the underworld guardian Mamian ("Horse-face")").
