= Li Shaojun =

Chinese alchemist and reputed immortal

Chinese name
- Chinese: 李少君
- Literal meaning: Li the Youthful Lord
Transcriptions
Standard Mandarin
- Hanyu Pinyin: Lǐ Shǎojūn
- Wade–Giles: Li Hsiao-chün
Middle Chinese
- Middle Chinese: LiX SyewHkjun
Old Chinese
- Baxter–Sagart (2014): C.rəʔ S-tewʔ-sC.qur

Korean name
- Hangul: 리소군
- Hanja: 李少君
Transcriptions
- Revised Romanization: Ri Sogun
- McCune–Reischauer: Ri Sogun

Japanese name
- Kanji: 李少君
- Hiragana: りしょうくん
Transcriptions
- Revised Hepburn: Ri Shōkun

Li Shaojun (Chinese: 李少君; Wade–Giles: Li Shao-chün, fl. 133 BCE) was a fangshi (master of esoterica), reputed xian (transcendent; immortal), retainer of Emperor Wu of Han, and the earliest known Chinese alchemist. In the early history of Chinese waidan (External Alchemy), Li is the only fangshi whose role is documented by both historical (for instance, Shiji) and alchemical (Baopuzi) sources.

== Shiji ==
The earliest record of Li Shaojun was contemporaneously written during the reign of his patron Emperor Wu (141-87 BCE): Sima Qian's c. 94 BCE Shiji (Records of the Historian) has nearly identical versions in the "Annals of Emperor Wu" (chapter 6) and "The Treatise on the Feng and Shan Sacrifices". In addition, the c. 111 CE Hanshu "Book of Han" (25A) has a "closely parallel" version.

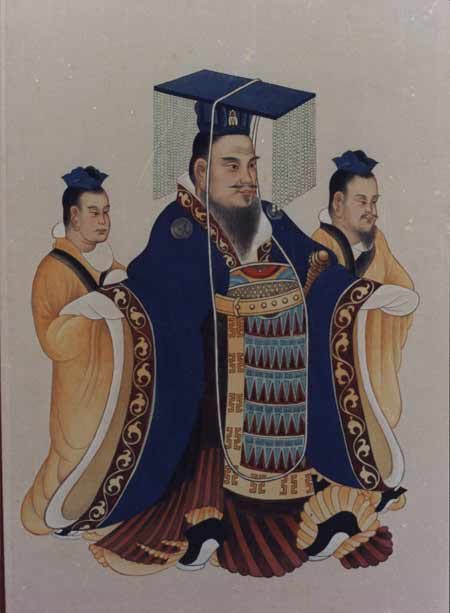
Emperor Wu of Han

The Shiji chronicles Li Shaojun as part of a lengthy debate on whether and how Emperor Wu should perform the Feng (封) and Shan (禪) state rituals on Mount Tai in honor of Heaven and Earth. Debaters were divided between two factions, the fangshi maintained that Wu should emulate the Yellow Emperor, their main deity, who obtained immortality through performing the rituals, while the Confucianist court officials such as Gongsun Hong suggested that the emperor should only express gratitude to Heaven and Earth.

The Liji narrative about Li Shaojun begins with his intentionally obscure origins and introduction to Emperor Wu, to whom he recommends cizao (祠灶; "sacrifice to the furnace/stove") and (穀道; gudao; "the Way of [avoiding] grains", a.k.a. 辟穀; bigu; "Daoist grain avoidance") as methods to attain longevity/immortality. Li does not name which furnace gods to worship, but the Stove God Zaoshen is traditionally associated both with alchemy and bigu, in Chinese raw/cooked logic, since cereal grains were cooked on the stove.

It was at this time also that Li Shaojun appeared before the emperor to expound the worship of the god of the fireplace and explain his theories on how to achieve immortality through dietary restrictions [祠灶穀道卻老方見]. The emperor treated him with great respect. Li Shaojun had formerly been a retainer of the marquis of Shenze and specialized in magical arts [主方]. He kept his real age and place of birth a secret, always telling people that he was seventy years old. Claiming that he could make the spirits serve him and prevent old age [能使物卻老], he travelled about to the courts of the various feudal lords, expounding his magic. He had no wife or children. When people heard of his power to command the spirits and drive away death [使物及不死] they showered him with a constant stream of presents, so that he always had more than enough food and clothing and money. Impressed that he seemed to enjoy such affluence without engaging in any business, and also not knowing where he was from, people put even greater faith in his claims and vied with each other in waiting on him. He relied wholly on his ability to work magic and was clever at making pronouncements that were later found to have been curiously apt [資好方善為巧發奇中].

Compare alternate translations of "art of making offerings to the (spirit of the) Furnace (i.e. carrying on alchemical practices), and knew how to live without (eating) cereals and without growing old", and "method of worshipping the furnace and abstaining from cereals to prevent old age". Burton Watson translates shiwu (使物) as " make the spirits serve him" and "command the spirits", interpreting wu (物; "thing, matter, phenomenon") as guiwu (鬼物; "ghosts; spirits; divine beings"); Joseph Needham translates "using natural substances to bring about perpetual youth", interpreting wu as yaowu (藥物; "medicines; drugs").

Since Li intentionally kept his birthplace and age secret, little is certain about his life, even his name is a pseudonym: Li the Youthful Lord. Li (李; "plum") is a very common Chinese surname and Shaojun (少君; "Youthful Lord") is a courtesy name—also used by Dou Shaojun (竇少君) or Dou Guangguo (竇廣國, d. 151 BCE), the younger brother of Empress Dou. Compare the 2nd-century BCE fangshi spiritualist mentioned below, Li Shaoweng (李少翁; "Li the Youthful Old Man"). The Shiji context continues with two "self-authenticating" stories about Li Shaojunbeing able to recall incidents of the distant past. The former describes him at a party given by Empress Wang Zhi's half-brother Tian Fen (田蚡, d. 131 BCE), who was enfeoffed as the Marquis of Wu'an in 141 BCE.

Once when he was staying with Tian Fen, the marquis of Wu'an, and was drinking with the marquis and his friends, he told one of the guests, an old man of over ninety, that he had gone with the man's grandfather to such and such a place to practise archery. The old man had in fact, when he was a child, accompanied his grandfather, and remembered visiting the place that Li Shaojun mentioned. With this the whole party was struck with amazement.

The latter story narrates how Li recognized a ritual bronze that belonged to Duke Huan of Qi (r. 685-643 BCE).

When Li Shaojun appeared before the emperor, the latter questioned him about an ancient bronze vessel which the emperor had in his possession. "This vessel," replied Li Shaojun, "was presented at the Cypress Chamber in the tenth year of the reign of Duke Huan of Qi (676 BC)." When the inscription on the vessel was deciphered, it was found that it had in fact belonged to Duke Huan of Qi. Everyone in the place was filled with astonishment and decided that Li Shaojun must be a spirit who had lived hundreds of years.

Emperor Wu was convinced that Li Shaojun could prevent the onset of old age and achieve deathlessness,

Next, the Shiji relates the emperor undertaking Li's convoluted, long-term alchemical project for achieving immortality through the same method as the Yellow Emperor. The alchemical process began with cizao (sacrificing to the furnace) in order to summon wu (物; "thing; matter; phenomenon"), interpreted again as guiwu (鬼物; "ghosts; spirits; divine beings"), who would transmute cinnabar into gold, which would gradually extend the emperor's life long enough to meet the xian of Penglai Island, and thus learn to correctly perform the feng and shan ceremonies. Li Shaojun authenticates his plan by describing his own meeting with the legendary immortal Anqi Sheng on Penglai. Needham literally interprets wu as natural substances or phenomena and not spiritual beings, and translates zhiwu (致物)– as "natural substances can be caused to change" or "natural phenomena can be caused to happen".

Li Shaojun then advised the emperor, "If you sacrifice to the fireplace you can call the spirits to you, and if the spirits come you can transform cinnabar into gold [祠灶則致物致物而丹沙可化為黃金]. Using this gold, you may make drinking and eating vessels, which will prolong the years of your life. With prolonged life you may visit the immortals who live on the island of Penglai in the middle of the sea. If you visit them and perform the Feng and Shan sacrifices, you will never die. This is what the Yellow Emperor did. Once I wandered by the sea and visited Master Anqi, and he fed me jujubes as big as melons. Master Anqi is an immortal who roams about Penglai. If he takes a liking to someone he will come to meet him, but if not he will hide." As a result, the emperor for the first time began to sacrifice in person to the fireplace. He dispatched magicians to set out on the sea in search of Master Anqi and the immortals of Penglai and attempted to make gold out of cinnabar sand and various kinds of medicinal ingredients.

The statement that Master Anqi will sometimes hide, "accomplishes four things at once: it confirms Li's own exalted status—for the clear implication is that Li has been deemed worthy of approach by An Qi; it portrays as restricted access to the sources of such methods as Li prescribes; it establishes a precedent for the contemporary adept's withholding of esoterica from the unworthy; and it acts as a failsafe lest the emperor practice the method unsuccessfully."

Li Shaojun's method shows that rituals were associated with Chinese alchemy since its earliest recorded beginnings. The Daoist Taiqing (太清; "Great Clarity") tradition likewise summoned gods and other supernatural beings while making elixirs. However, in contrast to later practices of waidan External Alchemy. Li's alchemical gold did not grant immortality, but only longevity, and his technique did not involve ingesting it but casting it into dishes and cups. This uncommon use of alchemical gold was mentioned in texts like the Jinye jing (金液經; "Scripture of the Golden Fluid"). This episode represents the first instance of imperial patronage of waidan practices, which continued during the Six Dynasties and intensified in the Tang period.

The Shiji narrative concludes with Li Shaojun's reported death, or perhaps his simulated shijie escape from the corpse, and the aftermath.

After some time, Li Shaojun fell ill and died [病死]. The emperor, however, believed that he was not really dead but had transformed himself into a spirit [化去不死], and he ordered Kuan Shu [寬舒], a clerk from Huangchui [黃錘], to carry on the magical arts which Li Shaojun had taught. None of the group sent out to search for Master Anqi in the island of Penglai succeeded in finding anything. After this, any number of strange and dubious magicians [怪迂之方士] from the seacoast of Yan and Qi appeared at court to speak to the emperor about supernatural affairs.

This Shiji passage about Emperor Wu and Li Shaojun, the earliest historically reliable document, is "surprisingly dense, relating as it does waidan to mythology, hagiography, ritual, and even state ceremonies." It is unclear whether Li's elaborate method represented a long but undocumented tradition before him or simply reflects his attempt at picking as many features as possible that would capture the emperor's interest and combining them into a secret "alchemical recipe".

== Lunheng ==
The skeptical philosopher and author Wang Chong's c. 80 CE Lunheng (Balanced Discourses) repeatedly mentions Li Shaojun in the Daoxu (道虛; "Daoist Untruths") chapter to demonstrate that while some individuals have had very long lives, no one has ever become a Daoist xian immortal. Wang's narrative generally follows the Shiji biography of Li Shaojun but adds some reasons to doubt its veracity.

The Lunheng narrative of Li's introduction to Emperor Wu has some different vocabulary than the Shiji, for instance, writing cizao (sacrifice to the furnace/stove) with the variant character zao (竈) in place of zao (灶) and using the common name bigu (辟穀; "grain avoidance") instead of gudao (穀道; "the Way of [avoiding] grains").

At the time of Han Wu Ti there lived a certain Li Shao Chün, who pretended that by sacrificing to the "Hearth" and abstaining from eating grain he could ward off old age [以祠竈辟穀卻老方見上]. He saw the emperor, who conferred high honours upon him. Li Shao Chün kept his age and the place where he was born and had grown up secret, always saying that he was seventy old, and could effect that things did not grow old. On his journeys he visited all the princes around and was not married. On hearing that he could manage that things did not age, people presented him with much richer gifts than they would otherwise have done. He had always money, gold, dresses, and food in abundance. As people believed that he did not do any business, and was yet richly provided with everything, and as nobody knew, what sort of a man he really was, there was a general competition in offering him services.

The Lunheng makes some minor changes in the two stories indicating that Li Shaojun was hundreds of years old. First, when Li meets the nonagenarian at the Marquis of Wu'an's party, instead of "The old man had in fact, when he was a child, accompanied his grandfather, and remembered visiting the place that Li Shaojun mentioned." Shiji says, "Li Shao Chün indicated to him the places which his grandfather frequented, when shooting. The old man knew them, having visited them as a child with his father." Second, when Li recognizes the ancient bronze vessel, the Lunheng dates it from "the 15th year" (671 BCE) instead of "the tenth year" (676) of the reign of Duke Huan of Qi.

More significantly, the Lunheng omits both the entire passage about Li Shaojun's multipart proposal for the emperor to achieve immortality and the emperor's doubts that Li actually died. The Duke Huan story concludes, "The whole Court was startled, and thought that Li Shao Chün was several hundred years old. After a long time he died of sickness." Wang Chong adds some reasons to doubt that Li avoided death through shijie corpse substitution.

Those who now-a-days are credited with the possession of Tao are men like Li Shao Chün. He died amongst men. His body was seen, and one knew, therefore, that his nature had been longevous. Had he dwelt in mountain-forests or gone into deserts, leaving no trace behind him, he would have died a solitary death of sickness amidst high rocks. His corpse would have been food for tigers, wolves, and foxes, but the world would again have believed him to have disappeared as a real immortal. The ordinary students of Tao have not Li Shao Chün's age. Before reaching a hundred years they die like all the others. Yet uncultured and ignorant people still hold that they are separated from their bodies, and vanish, and that, as a matter of fact, they do not die.

Lastly, Wang Chong gives three reasons to doubt the Shiji narrative about Li Shaojun.

The Grand Annalist Sima Qian was a contemporary of Li Shao Chün. Although he was not amongst those who came near to Li Shao Chün's body, when he had expired, he was in a position to learn the truth. If he really did not die, but only parted with his body [i.e., shijie], the Grand Annalist ought to have put it on record and would not have given the place of his death. The reference to the youth of the nonagenarian in the court would prove Li Shao Chün's age. Perhaps be was fourteen or fifteen years old, when the old man accompanied his grandfather as a boy. Why should Li Shao Chün not know this, if he lived 200 years? Wu Ti's time is very far from Duke Huan, when the bronze vase was cast, and Li Shao Chün cannot have seen it. Perhaps be heard once that in the palace there was an old vessel, or he examined the inscription beforehand to speak upon it, so that he was well-informed, when he saw it again. When our amateurs of to-day see an old sword or an antique crooked blade, they generally know where to place it. Does that imply that they saw, how it was wrought? ... Li Shao Chün taught Tao and a method to keep off old age by means of sacrificing to the "Hearth." He determined the period of a tripod cast under Duke Huan of Ch'i, and knew the places frequented, when hunting, by the grandfather of a nonagenarian, and yet he did not really attain to Tao. He was only a long-lived man, who died late.

== Baopuzi ==
The Daoist scholar Ge Hong's c. 320 Baopuzi ("Master who Embraces Simplicity") mentions Li Shaojun in three Inner Chapters passages. The longer one recounts his biography differently than the Shiji, and two shorter ones mention him in context with the fangshi' Luan Da (d. 112 BCE) who promised immortality to Emperor Wu but was executed after failing to provide it.

The Baopuzi biography of Li Shaojun cites two Han dynasty historical sources that are no longer extant, adding that Li's poverty was the reason he went to Emperor Wu, and an imperial dream foretelling his death. Ge Hong also lists three levels of xian transcendents and concludes that Li must have used the lowest shijie "liberation by means of a simulated corpse" because his exhumed coffin did not contain a corpse.

According to Dong Zhongshu's Family [Lineage?] Records of Li Shaojun (李少君家錄), "Li Shaojun possessed an esoteric method for deathlessness, but since his family was poor he lacked the means to buy the ingredients. He therefore presented himself at the Han [court] in order to acquire funds. When his way was complete, he departed." Also, according to the Annotated Record of Activities at the Han Court (漢禁中起居註), '"When Li Shaojun was about to depart, Emperor Wu dreamed that he was climbing Mount Songgao with him. Halfway up, a messenger riding a dragon and holding a tally descended from the clouds and announced that Taiyi had invited Li Shaojun. Then the emperor awoke, and told his retainers, 'If what I dreamed is true, Li Shaojun is about to abandon us and depart.' Several days later, Li announced that he was ill, and he died. Later, the emperor had someone open Li's coffin. There was no corpse inside, only his clothing and cap." Now, according to the Scripture on Transcendence (仙經), superior practitioners who rise up in their bodies and ascend into the void (juxing shengxu 舉形昇虛) are termed celestial transcendents (tianxian 天仙). Middle-level practitioners who wander among noted mountains are termed earthbound transcendents (dixian 地仙). Lesser practitioners who first die and then slough off are termed "escape-by-means-of-a-simulated-corpse transcendents" (shijiexian 屍解仙). Li's must clearly be a case of escape by means of a simulated corpse, then.

Li Shaojun's contemporary Dong Zhongshu (179-104 BCE) was a Confucianist official under Emperor Wu, see the Shenxian zhuan below.

The first Baopuzi context about Li Shaojun and Luan Da (欒大 miswritten as Luan Tai 欒太) says, "The reason people of the world do not believe that transcendence may be practiced and do not grant that one's allotted life span may be lengthened is none other than that the First Emperor of Qin and Emperor Wu of the Han sought it without results and that Li Shaojun and Luan Tai [sic] practiced it ineffectively (為之無驗)." The second one concerns Ge Hong's contemporary Gu Qiang (古強), a charlatan healer who claimed to be a 4,000-year-old xian, "the wealth amassed by the recent, fraudulent practitioner Gu Qiang is said to be no less than that showered by the Han emperor on Luan Da and Li Shaojun."

== Shenxian zhuan ==
Besides the Baopuzi, Ge Hong also compiled the original c. 318 Shenxian Zhuan (Biographies of Divine Transcendents) that gives a highly detailed hagiography of Li Shaojun, which Campany classifies in "Group A", the earliest-attested content from before 500 CE.

The Biographies of Divine Transcendents narrative begins with Li meeting Emperor Wu, adding information about his courtesy name "Cloud Wing" and birthplace in Qi (see Duke Huan above). While the Shiji mentioned Li Shaojun meeting Anqi Sheng, the Shenxian zhuan adds that he gave Li the immortality elixir formula.

Li Shaojun, styled Yunyi 雲翼, was a native of Qi. At the time when Han Emperor Wu had issued his call for masters of esoterica, Li had received from Master An Qi 安期 an esoteric method for making an elixir over a furnace fire. Because his family was poor, he could not obtain the necessary medicinal ingredients. He said to his disciples, "I'm about to become an old man. My capital is insufficient. Although I have worked hard behind the plow, it isn't enough to procure all the ingredients. But now the Son of Heaven loves the Dao. I would like to go and have an audience with him and ask him for the resources with which to synthesize the drug. Then I can do as I like." So he presented a method to the emperor, saying, "From natural cinnabar may be produced yellow gold; and when the gold is completed and ingested, one ascends and becomes a transcendent. I have often traveled across the seas, I have met Master An Qi, and I have eaten jujubes as big as melons." The Son of Heaven greatly venerated and honored him and bestowed untold wealth on him.

The Shenxian zhuan narrative summarizes the two stories about Li remembering historical events, and also describes his youthful appearance.

Li Shaojun was once drinking and dining with the Marquis of Wu'an. In the group was an elderly man over ninety. Li asked his name. He then commented that he had once traveled with the old man's grandfather, that he had one night seen a little boy following after the grandfather, and that the two of them were consequently former acquaintances. All present at the time were astonished. Also, during Li's audience with Emperor Wu, he noticed an ancient bronze vessel nearby. Recognizing it, he remarked, "Duke Huan of Qi. displayed this vessel in his chamber of repose." The emperor checked his words against the inscription carved into the bronze, and it did indeed turn out to be an ancient Qi vessel. From this he realized that Li was several hundred years old. But he looked to be around fifty. His facial complexion was excellent, his flesh smooth and radiant, and his mouth and teeth were like those of a youth. When the princes, officials, and nobles [at court] heard that he could cause people not to die, they all esteemed him highly and gave him mountains of money.

Ge Hong adds the element of deception into the narrative. Having obtained imperial patronage to purchase the expensive alchemical ingredients, Li prepared the immortality elixir for himself, feigned illness, and performed shijie to escape from not only from death but also from his demanding patron.

And so Li Shaojun secretly made the divine elixir. When it was completed, he said to the emperor: "His majesty is incapable of distancing himself from luxury or of removing himself from music and sex. He cannot call a halt to killings and executions, nor can he overcome joy and anger. He cannot change the fact that for ten thousand li around there are homeless cloud-souls and in the cities and courts there are bloody punishments. Under such circumstances, the great way of the divine elixir cannot be completed." But he nevertheless gave a minor medicinal formula to the emperor. Li Shaojun then announced that he was ill. That same night [before the news had reached him] the emperor dreamed that he was climbing Mount Song with Li. When they were halfway up, a [celestial] messenger riding a dragon and holding a seal of office came through the clouds and said that the Grand Monad had invited Li [to ascend into the heavens]. Then the emperor awakened. At once he sent someone to inquire what Li was up to, and he said to his close advisers, "Last night I dreamed that Li abandoned us." When it turned out that Li was ill, the emperor went to call on him, and he also designated someone to receive Li's esoteric methods. But before this matter was concluded, Li expired. The emperor said, "Li hasn't died; he has intentionally departed by transformation, that's all." Meanwhile, the body was being shrouded when suddenly it disappeared. None of the inner and outer garments were unfastened; they were like a cicada shell. The emperor regretted that he had not sought [formulas] from Li more diligently.

This Shenxian zhuan hagiography gives a long account, possibly invented by Ge Hong, about Li Shaojun preparing a waidan alchemical elixir for his seriously ill friend Dong Zhongshu, who "often scoffed at people of the world for ingesting drugs and practicing the Dao". Li combined Polygonatum with several unidentifiable ingredients and "cooked them in a bronze vessel during the first ten days of the tenth month; young boys who had bathed and purified themselves regulated the heat of the cooking flame." When the medicine was fully transmuted, ingesting one "dose would cause one's body to become light; three doses would cause one's [old] teeth to fall out and new ones to grow in; a full five doses would cause one's allotted life span never to expire." Several months later when Dong's illness worsened, he finally took Li Shao Jun's medicine. First, he took less than half a dose and "his body grew light and strong, and his illness was suddenly healed". After taking a full dose, "his breath and strength were as they had been when he was young. Only now did he believe that there was a way of long life and deathlessness." This experience convinced Dong Zhongshu to resign from the imperial court and spend the rest of his life unsuccessfully searching for a Daoist master who could reproduce Li's immortality elixir, and he remained healthy until his death at more than eighty years. On his deathbed, Dong told his son,

When I was still young, I obtained Li Shaojun's esoteric medicine. At first I didn't believe in it; after I used it, I regained strength, but then I was never able to grasp [the method for making] it. I will carry this regret with me to the Yellow Springs [where the dead went]. You must go and search among people for a master of esoteric arts, someone who can explain the meaning of this method. If you persist in taking this medicine, you will certainly transcend the world."

Campany notes the absence of independent evidence that Dong Zhongshu ever became a believer in Daoist transcendence techniques, although Ge Hong's Baopuzi cites a text titled Family [Lineage?] Records of Li Shaojun and identifies Dong Zhongshu as its author.

Although unattested before the Tang dynasty, later Shenxian zhuan editions of Li Xiaojun's hagiography add a narrative about his disciple, Li Shaoweng (李少翁, Li the Youthful Old Man), who also escapes through shijie by replacing his body with a bamboo tube simulacrum. Both of them stage their deaths in time to avoid being compelled to reveal fully their esoteric skills. Li Shaojun and Li Shaoweng are commonly confused or conflated.

The Shiji, which does not mention Li Shaoweng being a student of Li Xiaojun, says Emperor Wu granted the title Wencheng jiangjun to the necromancer Li Shaoweng who performed the zhaohun (招魂; "summon the hun-soul") ritual for Emperor Wu's beloved Consort Li (李氏, d. 150 BCE). Over time, Li Shaoweng's magical arts grew less and less effective, and he attempted to deceive the emperor by making an ox eat a message written on a piece of silk, and then announcing, "There appears to be some strange object in this ox's belly!" The ox was killed and cut open, revealing "exceedingly strange" words written on the silk, however, the emperor recognized Li's handwriting and had him secretly executed in 119 BCE.

At this time there was the General of Civil Accomplishment (Wencheng jiangjun), who also obtained some of Li Shaojun's arts and served under Emperor Wu. Later, the emperor sent an envoy to have him killed. The general told the envoy: "Please apologize on my behalf to the emperor. I cannot bear to lessen my days here and ruin my work on the Great Task. [That is, the work of synthesizing an elixir] If the emperor loves [arts of] caring for oneself, tell him to look for me thirty years hence on Mount Cheng. We can work on the esoteric method together, and thus he need not resent me." [He was then executed.] When the envoy returned, he relayed the message to the emperor, who ordered [the general's] coffin opened and inspected. There was nothing inside it but a bamboo tube. The emperor suspected that his disciples had stolen and hidden his body, so he had them rounded up and questioned. He was then very remorseful. After his execution of the general, he once again issued a call to all masters of esoterica, and he performed another sacrifice to the Grand Monad at Sweetwater Springs, where he set up another altar and presented offerings to the general. The emperor was in personal attendance at the ceremonies.

== Later texts ==
Numerous Daoist texts repeated and expanded the early narratives about Li Shaojun, but his image in the later tradition is not always positive. For instance, the 7th-century commentary to the Taiqing school classic Jiudan jing (九丹經; "Scripture of the Nine Elixirs") refers to Li's method, saying that the gold of vessels used for eating and drinking "affords longevity as it slowly saturates one's stomach, permeating the system of transmutation of food into nutritional essences". However, the commentary also blames Li Shaojun because his performance gave more importance to cizao offerings to the deity of the furnace, described as zuǒdào (左道; 'Ways of the left'; "heterodox doctrine; a term often applied to magic"), but did not address the "correct" waidan methods of highest Taiqing deities such as Taiyi Great One and the Yellow Emperor.
