= Anqi Sheng =

Taoist immortal

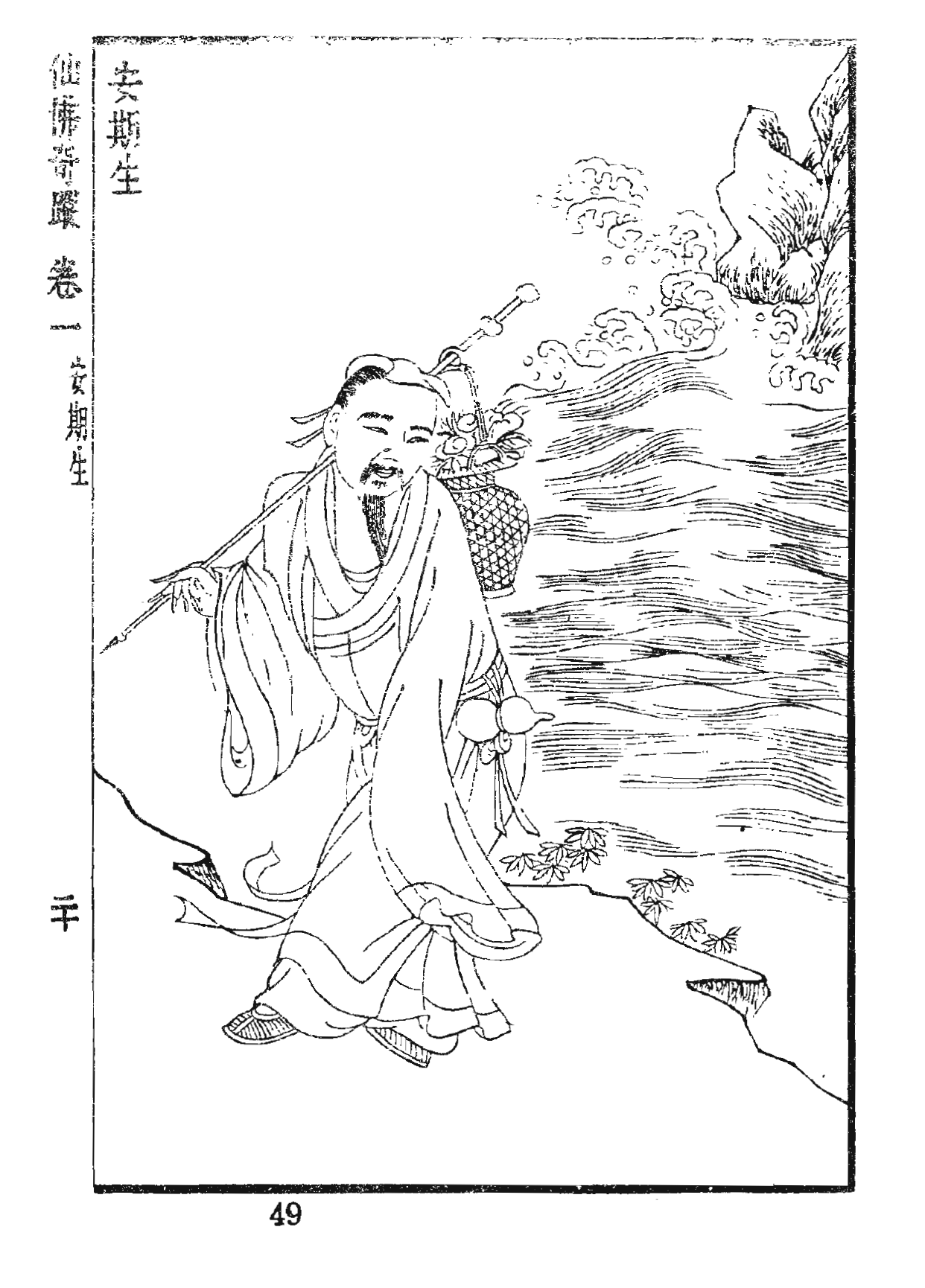

Anqi Sheng (Chinese: 安期生; Wade–Giles: An-ch’i Shêng) was a Chinese immortal and wizard, said to be already over 1,000 years old at the time of Qin Shi Huang, the first emperor.

He was said to inhabit Mount Penglai. Anqi was said to have been a Taoist wizard, able to render himself visible or invisible at his pleasure. According to the Daoist hagiography Liexian Zhuan, Qin Shi Huang spoke with him for three entire days (including nights), and offered Anqi jade and gold. Qin Shi Huang feared death, and sought immortality, without success. In 219 BC, he sent an expedition under Xu Fu to find Anqi and to bring him back, along with the elixir of life, which grants immortality or eternal youth. When Xu Fu reported that a sea creature blocked the expedition's path, Qin Shi Huang sent archers to kill it. In 210 BC, Xu Fu continued his journey. Legend says he found Japan instead, proclaimed himself king, and never returned. The Records of the Grand Historian state that Li Shaojun visited Anqi Sheng during his travels. There is no record, however, of where they met or of Mount Penglai itself. In 130 BC, Emperor Wu of Han also sent an expedition to find Anqi, which proved unsuccessful.

Anqi holds an important place in the Taiqing and Shangqing Schools. Hagiographies of the Daoist transcendent Maming Sheng (馬鳴生, "Master Horse-neigh") record that he was a disciple of Anqi Sheng, from whom he received a waidan, External Alchemy scripture, that enabled him to refine an effective elixir of immortality.
