= Lionel Giles =

British sinologist, writer, and philosopher (1875–1958)

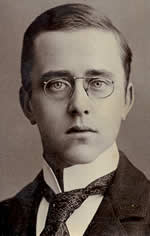
- Lionel Giles, translator of The Art of War and the Analects of Confucius
- Born: 29 December 1875; Sutton, London, U.K.
- Died: 22 January 1958 (aged 82)
- Citizenship: British
- Education: Wadham College, Oxford
- Scientific career
- Fields: History, Sinology

Lionel Giles CBE (29 December 1875 – 22 January 1958) was a British sinologist, writer, and philosopher. Lionel Giles served as assistant curator at the British Museum and Keeper of the Department of Oriental Manuscripts and Printed Books. He is most notable for his 1910 translations of The Art of War by Sun Tzu and The Analects of Confucius.

Giles was the son of British diplomat and sinologist Herbert Giles.

== Early life ==
Giles was born in Sutton, the fourth son of Herbert Giles and his first wife Catherine Fenn. Educated privately in Belgium (Liège), Austria (Feldkirch), and Scotland (Aberdeen), Giles studied Classics at Wadham College, Oxford, graduating BA in 1899.

== The Art of War ==
The 1910 Giles translation of The Art of War succeeded British officer Everard Ferguson Calthrop's 1905 and 1908 translations, and refuted large portions of Calthrop's work. In the Introduction, Giles writes:

It is not merely a question of downright blunders, from which none can hope to be wholly exempt. Omissions were frequent; hard passages were willfully distorted or slurred over. Such offenses are less pardonable. They would not be tolerated in any edition of a Latin or Greek classic, and a similar standard of honesty ought to be insisted upon in translations from Chinese.

== Sinology ==
Lionel Giles used the Wade-Giles romanisation method of translation, pioneered by his father Herbert. Like many sinologists in the Victorian and Edwardian eras, he was primarily interested in Chinese literature, which was approached as a branch of classics.

Continuing to produce translations of Chinese classics well into the later part of his life, he was quoted by John Minford as having confessed to a friend that he was a "Taoist at heart, and I can well believe it, since he was fond of a quiet life, and was free of that extreme form of combative scholarship which seems to be the hall mark of most Sinologists."

== Translations ==
The prodigious translations of Lionel Giles include the books of: Sun Tzu, Lao Tzu, Chuang Tzu, Lie Yukou, Mencius, and Confucius.

- The Art of War (1910), originally published as The Art of War: The Oldest Military Treatise in the World
- The Sayings of Lao Tzu and Taoist Teachings (1912), now known as the Tao Te Ching
- Musings of a Chinese Mystic: Selections from the Philosophy of Chuang Tzŭ. 1906
- Taoist Teachings from the Book of Lieh-Tzŭ. Wisdom of the East. 1912.
- The Analects of Confucius (1910), also known as the Analects or The Sayings of Confucius
- The Book of Mencius (1942)
- The Life of Ch'iu Chin
- The Lament of the Lady of Ch'in
- A Gallery of Chinese Immortals (1948), excerpts from the Liexian Zhuan (列仙傳)
- Biographies from Lives of Immortals (列仙傳; Liu Xiang 劉向) and Lives of Divine Mortals (神仙傳. Ge Hong 葛洪)

== See also ==
- Chinese language
- Chinese literature
- Chinese classics
- Sinology
- Wade-Giles Romanization system
