= Xuandu Temple =

Taoist temple in Hengshan, China

- 玄都观
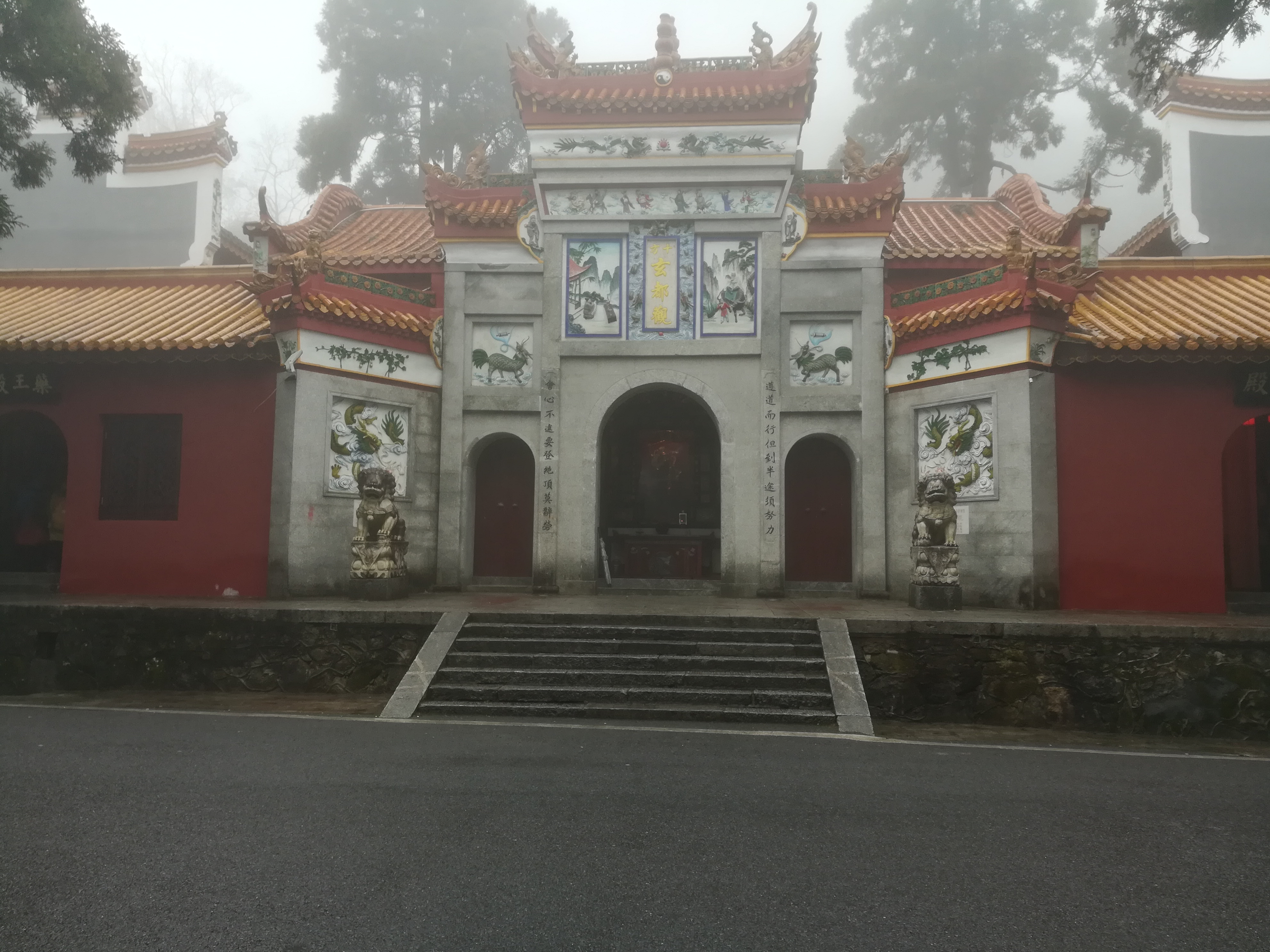
- The shanmen of Xuandu Temple

- Location within Hunan Location within China

Religion
- Affiliation: Taoism
- Prefecture: Hengshan County
- Province: Hunan
- Deity: Three Pure Ones

Location
- Country: China
- Interactive map of Xuandu Temple
- Prefecture: Hengshan County
- Coordinates: 27°16′27.22″N 112°42′06.36″E

Architecture
- Style: Chinese architecture
- Founder: Tan Jiaoqing (谭教清)
- Established: 1862–1874

The Xuandu Temple (simplified Chinese: 玄都观; traditional Chinese: 玄都觀; pinyin: Xuándū Guàn) is a Taoist temple located on the hillside of Mount Heng, in Hengshan County, Hunan, China. It is the site of Hunan Taoist Association.

== History ==
The Xuandu Temple was first established in the Tongzhi period (1862-1874) of Qing dynasty (1644–1911) by Taoist priest Tan Jiaoqing (谭教清). It formerly known as a Buddhist temple named Xiyun'an (吸云庵), which was built in the Southern Qi dynasty (479–502).

On November 3, 1985, the Hunan Taoist Association was set up here.

== Architecture ==
The temple consists of more than 5 buildings, including shanmen, HalI of the God of Wealth, Hall of Medicine King, Main Hall, and Sanqing Hall (Hall of Three Pure Ones).

=== Main Hall ===
The Main Hall is the second hall in the temple for the worship of the Jade Emperor.

=== Sanqing Hall ===
The Sanqing Hall or Hall of Three Pure Ones is the third hall in the temple. In the middle is Yuanshi Tianzun, statues of Daode Tianzun and Lingbao Tianzun stand on the left and right sides.
