= Mount Qingcheng =

Mountain in Sichuan, China

UNESCO World Heritage Site
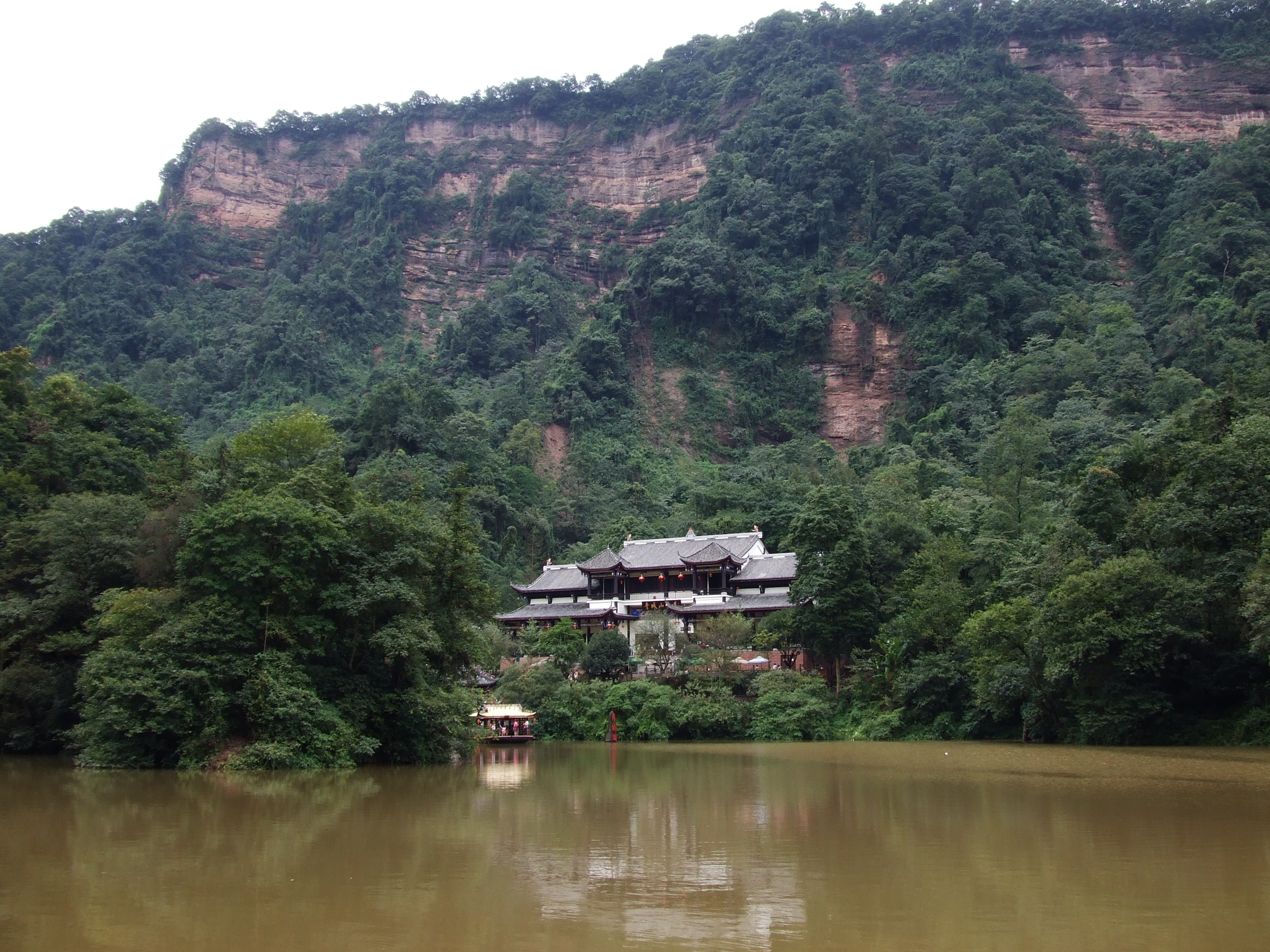

- Location within Sichuan Location within China
- Location: Dujiangyan City, Chengdu, Sichuan, People's Republic of China
- Part of: Mount Qingcheng and the Dujiangyan Irrigation System
- Criteria: Cultural: (ii)(iv)(vi)
- Reference: 1001
- Inscription: 2000 (24th Session)
- Coordinates: 30°54′38″N 103°33′28″E

Mount Qingcheng (Chinese: 青城山; pinyin: Qīngchéng Shān) is a sacred Taoist mountain in Dujiangyan, Chengdu, Sichuan, China.

It is considered one of the birthplaces of Taoism and one of the most important Taoist religious sites in China. In Taoist mythology, it was the site of the Yellow Emperor's studies with Ning Fengzi. As an important site of the Taoism, it became host to many Taoist monasteries and temples. The mountain has 36 peaks. It is also home to Dujiangyan Giant Panda Center and since 2000 has been listed as a UNESCO World Heritage Site. Mount Qingcheng was affected by the Wenchuan Earthquake in 2008.

Laojun Tower

== History ==
In 142 AD, the first Celestial Master Zhang Daoling developed the Way of the Five Pecks of Rice, a prominent movement in Taoism. Many of the essential elements of Taoism derived from the teachings and practices of the temples that were built on the mountain during the Jin and Tang dynasties. There are 11 Taoist temples on the mountain, and Mount Qingcheng was an important spiritual and philosophical center until the 17th century.

== Places of interest ==
=== Jianfu Palace ===
"Located at the foot of Mount Zhangren, Jianfu Palace was firstly built in the Tang dynasty and repeatedly renovated in the following dynasties. There are only two halls and three compounds renovated in the Qing dynasty left today. Leading figures of the Taoist school are worshiped in the splendid Main Hall of Jianfu Palace. In Weixin Pavilion, the dresser of the Princess consort of Prince Qingfu in the Ming dynasty, is preserved.

It is the first Taoist temple on Mount Qingcheng."

=== Chaoyang Cave ===
"Located at the foot of the main peak of Mount Laoxiao, the Cave is deep, with drops of water falling down occasionally. Chaoyao Cave is also a magnificent Taoist temple built under steep cliffs which are part of the terrain."

=== Shangqing Palace ===
"Located at the peak of Mount Qingcheng with an altitude over 1,500 m, Shangqing Palace marks the end of the touring route of Mount Qingcheng. Buildings such as Laojun Hall, Sanqing Hall, Wenwu Hall, and Tao Te Ching Preaching Hall in the Taoist temple of Shangqing Palace with several cultural relics, were originally built in the Jin Dynasty."

== Gallery ==
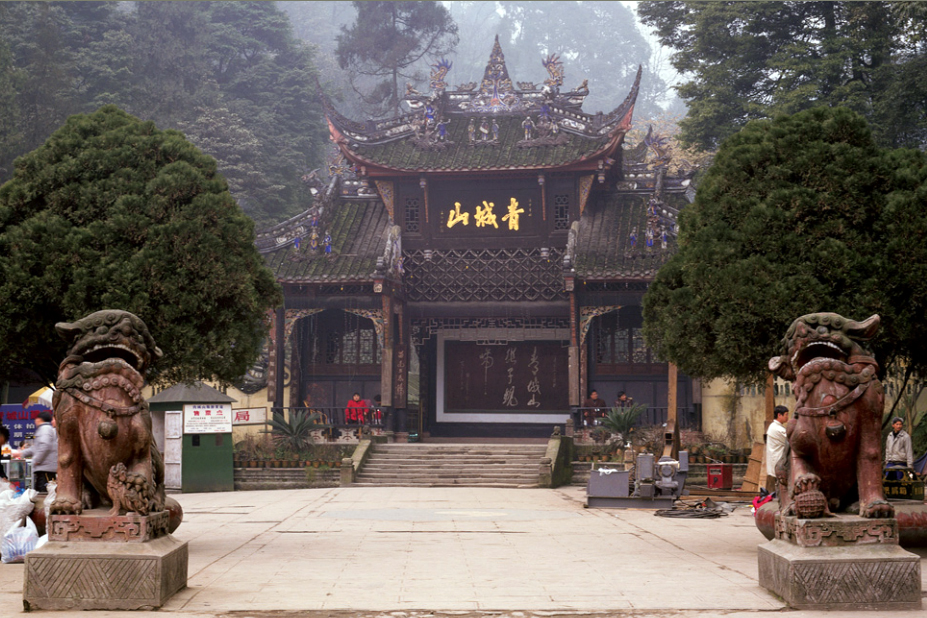
Front Gate of Mount Qingcheng

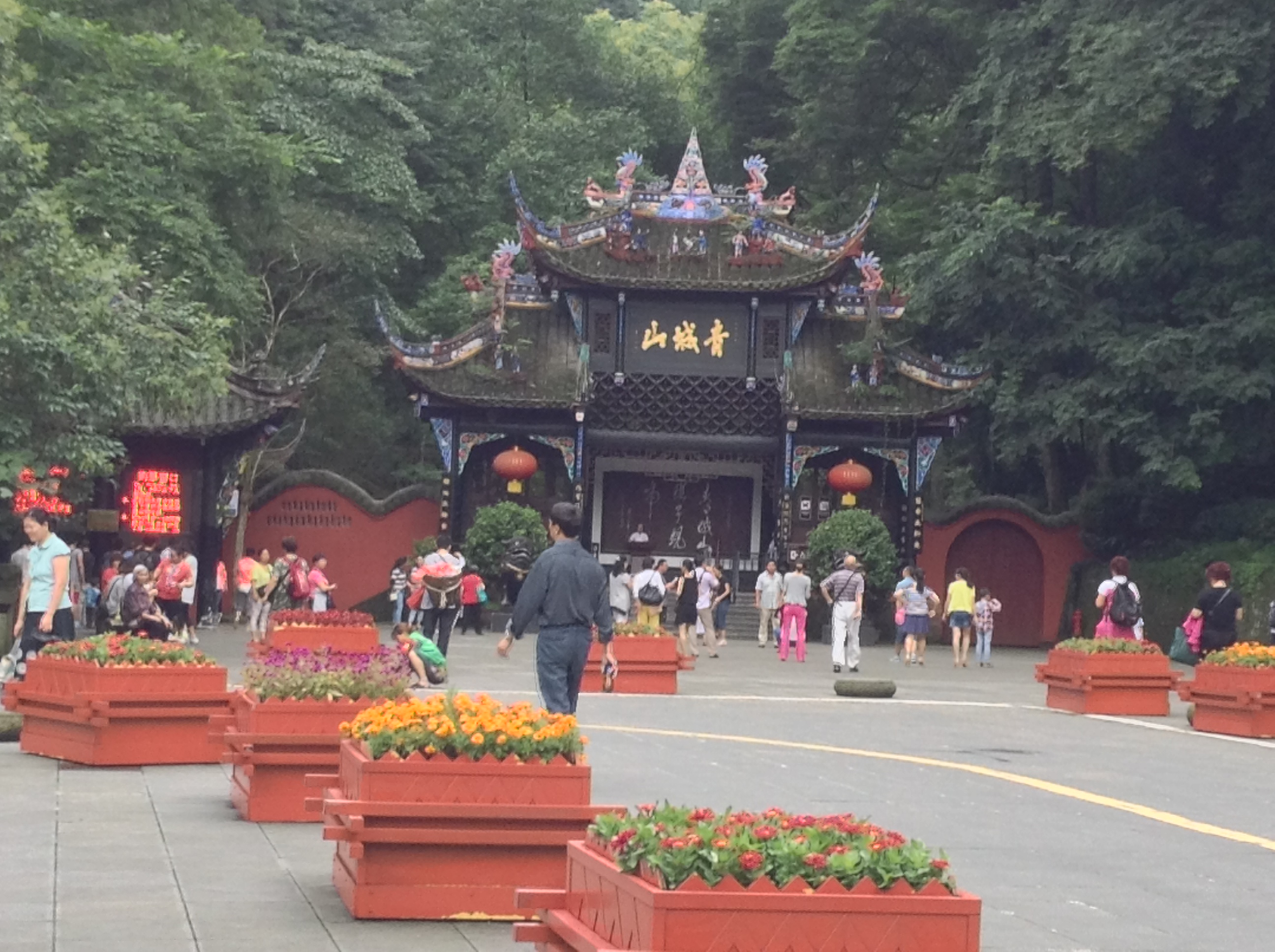
Front Gate of Mount Qingcheng

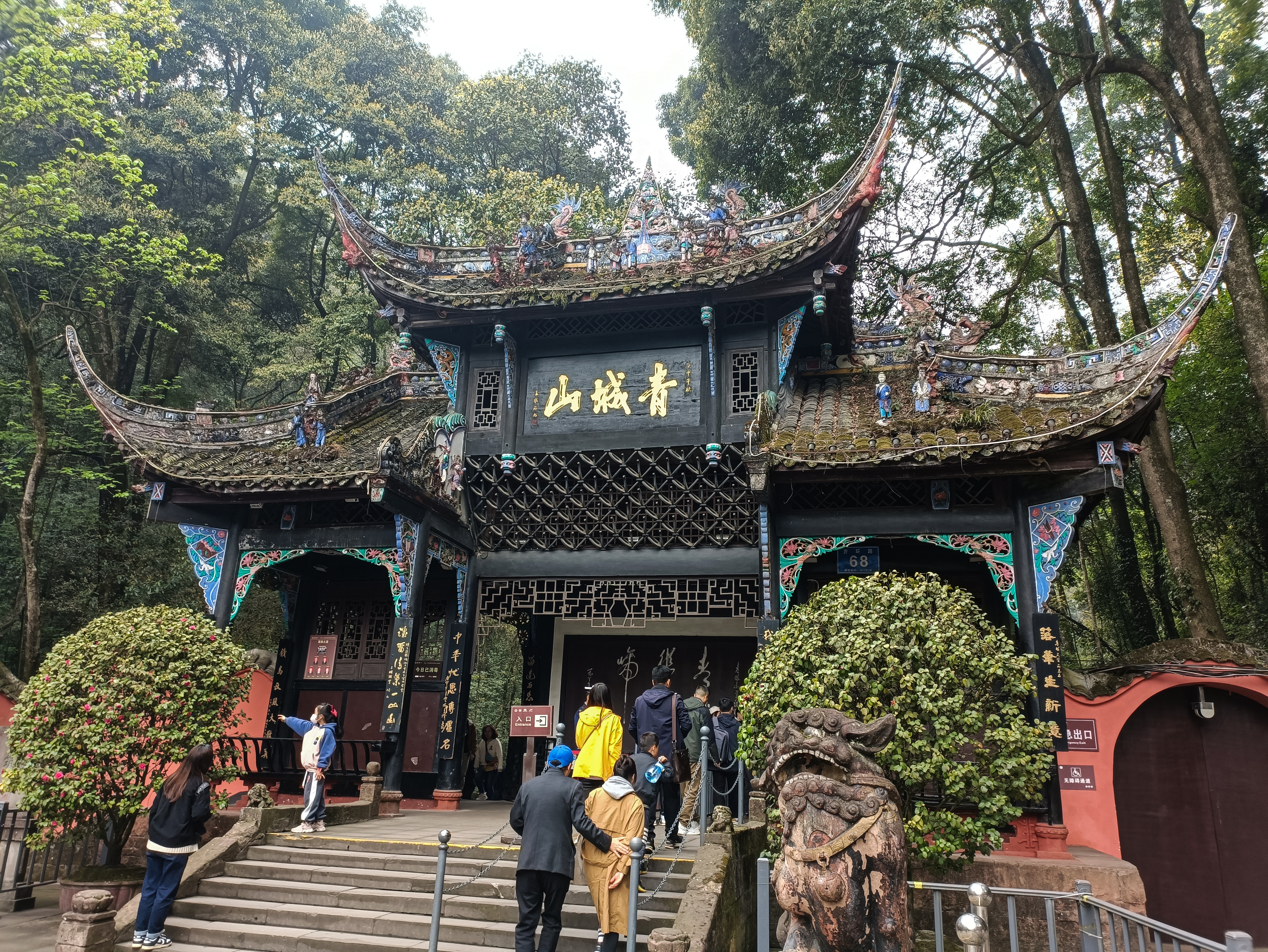
Front Gate of Mount Qingcheng

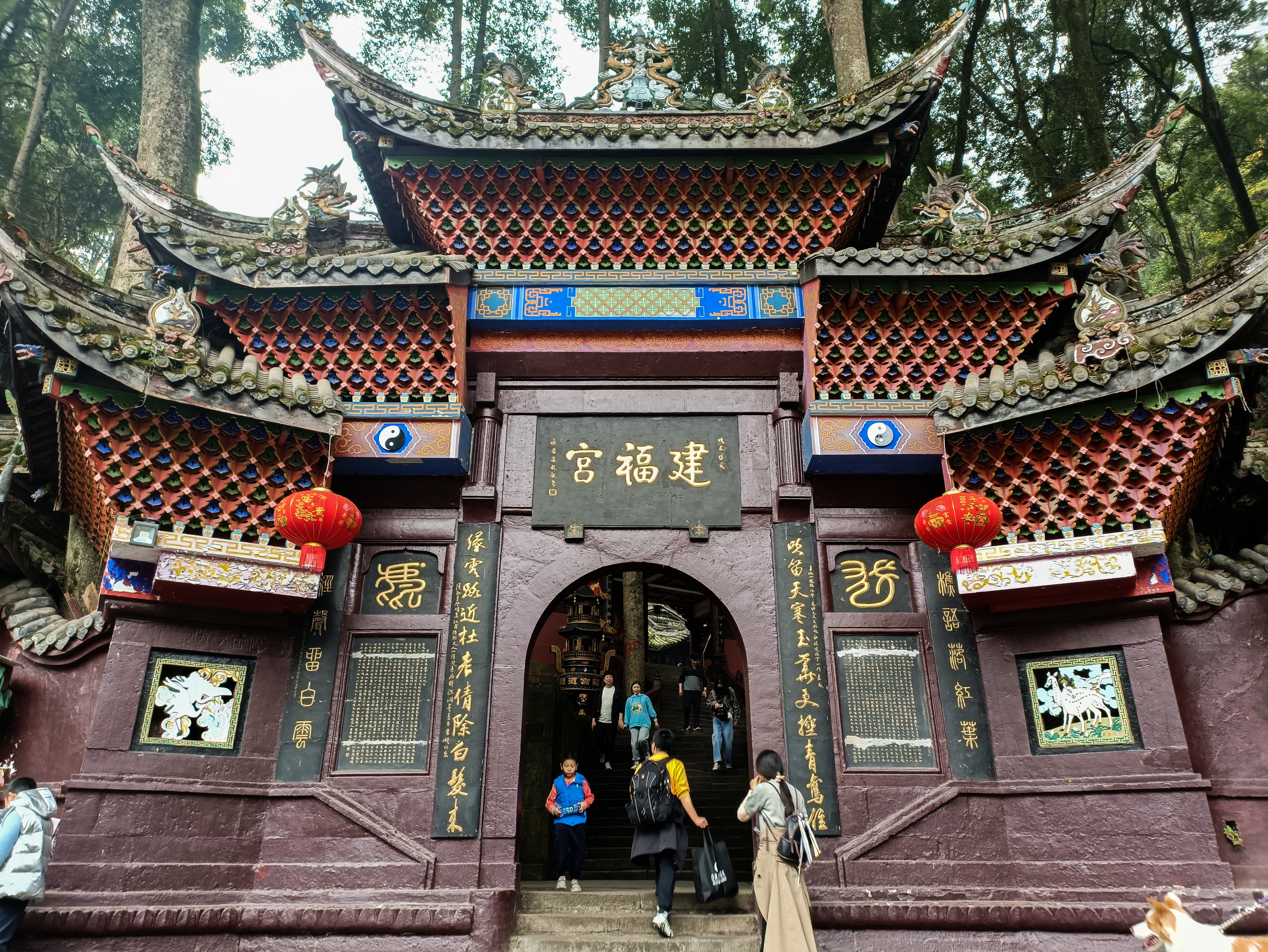
Jianfu Palace

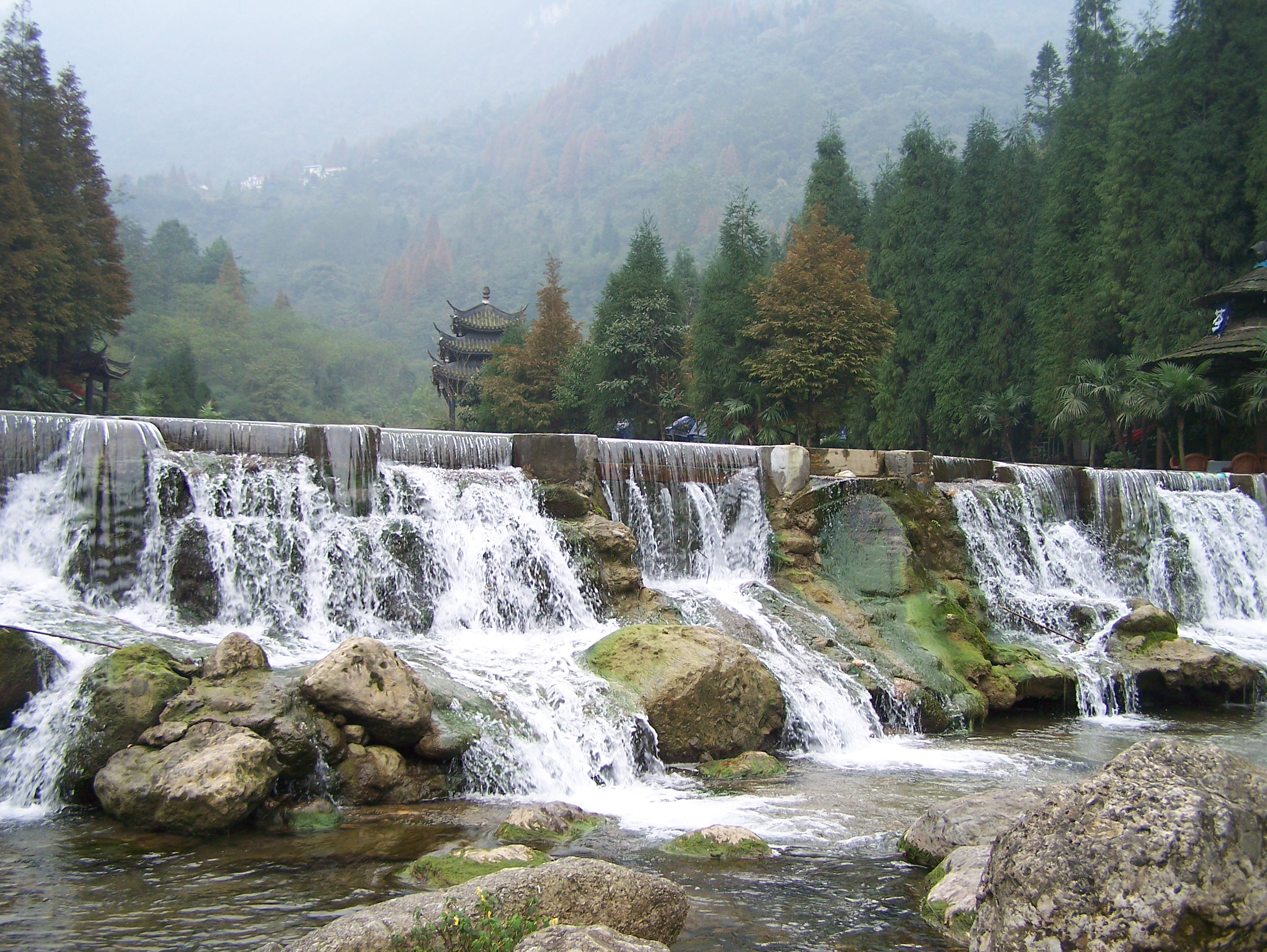
Waterfalls at Mount Qingcheng

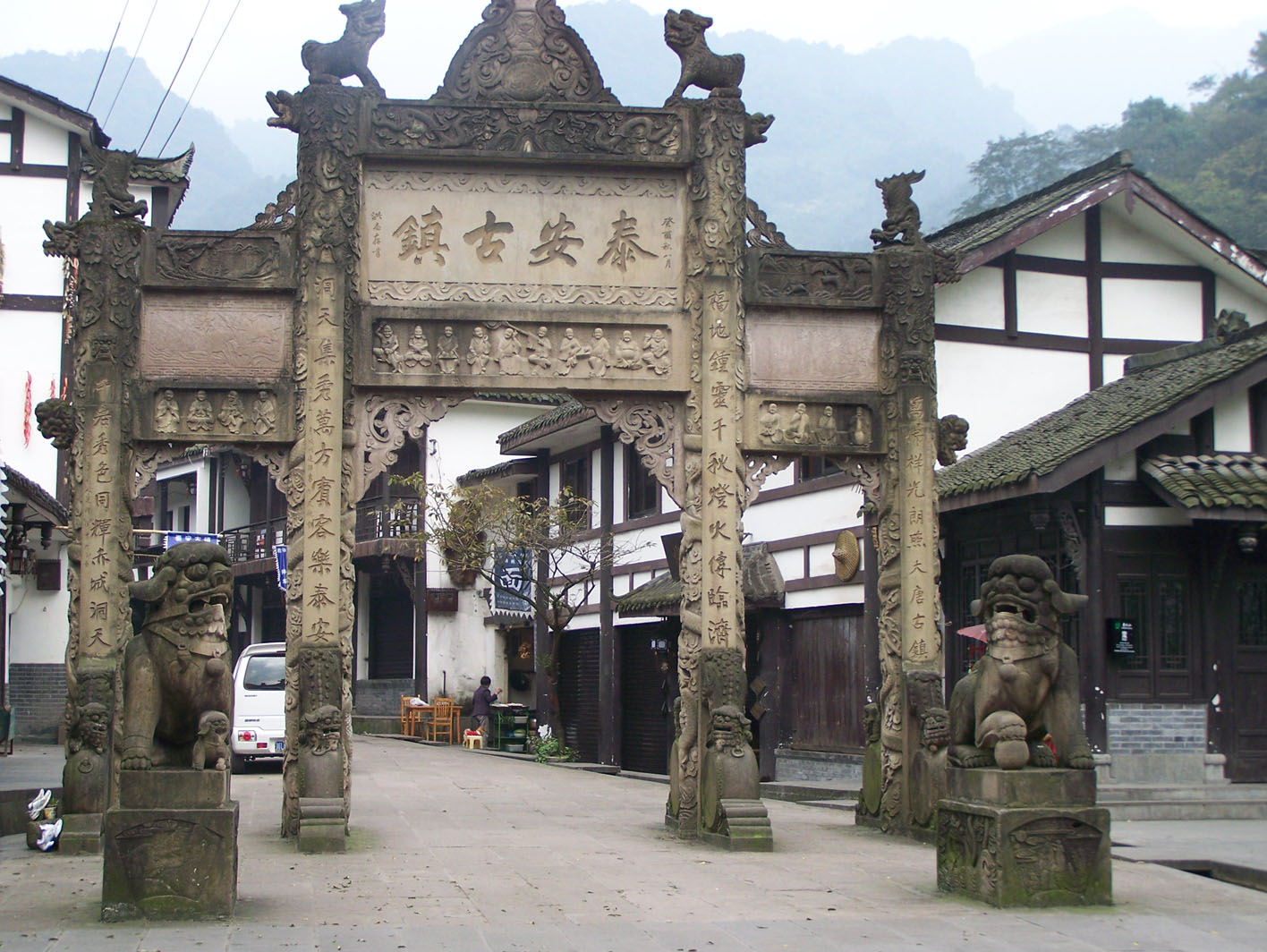
Tai'an Ancient Village at the foot of Mount Qingcheng

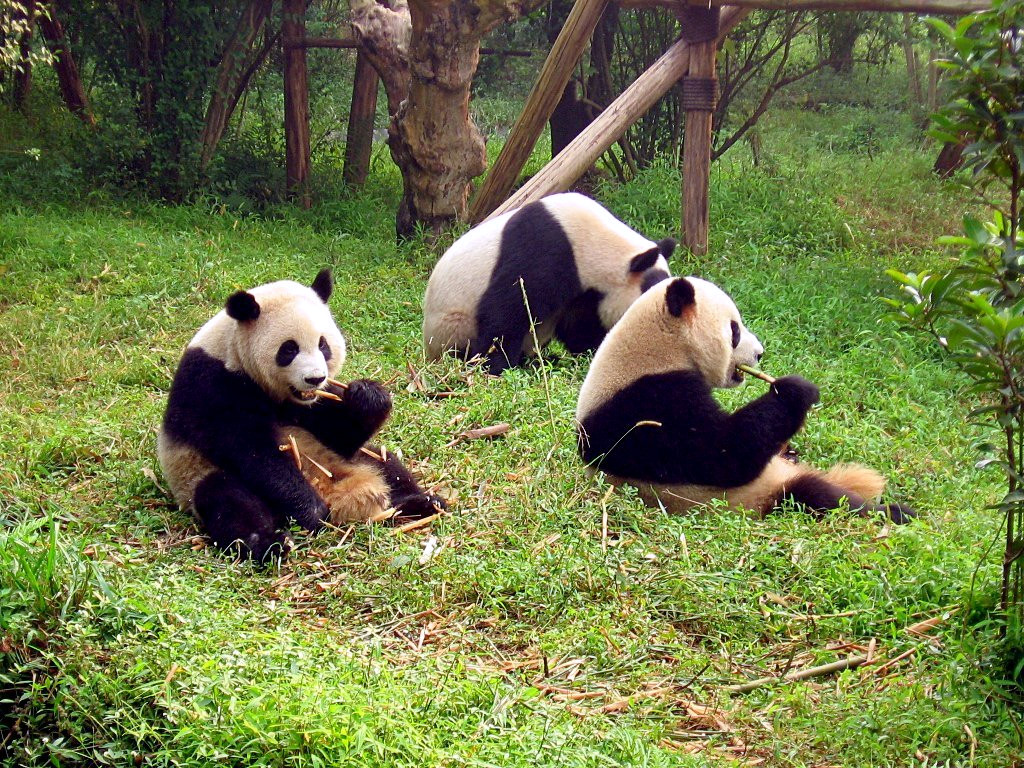

== See also ==
- Qingchengshan railway station, named after the Mount Qingcheng in Dujiangyan, Chengdu, Sichuan Province, China
