= Shenxian Zhuan =

Biography of Taoist deities and xian

- Traditional Chinese: 神仙傳
- Simplified Chinese: 神仙传
- Literal meaning: Records of the Gods & Immortals; Records of the Divine Immortals
Transcriptions
Standard Mandarin
- Hanyu Pinyin: Shénxiān zhuàn
- Wade–Giles: Shen–Hsien Chuan

The Shenxian Zhuan, sometimes given in translation as the Biographies of the Deities and Immortals, is a hagiography of immortals and description of Chinese gods, partially attributed to the Daoist scholar Ge Hong (283-343). In the history of Chinese literature, the Shenxian Zhuan followed the Liexian Zhuan ("Collected Biographies the Immortals").

== Title ==
The Shenxian Zhuan title combines three words:

- shen 神 "spirit; god; divine; supernatural; awareness; consciousness"
- xian 仙 "transcendent; immortal; saint; celestial being; alchemist"
- zhuan 傳 "commentary on a classic (e.g., Zuozhuan); biography; tradition"

The word shenxian 神仙 can be parsed either as shénxiān "gods and transcendents" or as shénxian "divine transcendent". Shenxian commonly occurs in Standard Chinese usage. Examples (with literal meanings) include both words like shenxianyan 神仙眼 (with "eyes") "seer; clairvoyant" or shenxianyu 神仙魚 ("fish") "angelfish", and phrases like shenxian xiafan 神仙下凡 ("come down to earth") "an immortal becomes incarnate" or shenxianzhongren 神仙中人 ("among people") "the happiest mortal alive".

Scholars have variously translated Shenxian Zhuan as:

- Biographies of Taoist divinities and adepts
- Lives of the Divine Hsien
- Lives of Spirit Immortals
- Lives of the Holy Immortals
- Lives of Divine Transcendents
- Traditions of Divine Transcendents
- Biographies of Divine Immortals

Zhuan 傳 is consistently translated as "biographies" or "lives", with the exception of Robert Ford Campany's "traditions", based upon the meaning "to transmit". Livia Kohn criticizes Campany's translation that "ignores the fact that the word was obviously used in dynastic historical and other collections to mean "biography."

== Authorship ==
Pages from a printed edition of Shenxian Zhuan

The Shenxian Zhuan is traditionally attributed to the Jin dynasty scholar and religious practitioner Ge Hong, who is best known as author of the Baopuzi "Master Who Embraces Simplicity". "The majority of Chinese critics," Sailey notes, "believe that the version which we have today is probably not the same one that Ge Hong wrote."

Ge's autobiography (Baopuzi Outer Chapter 50) records that he completed writing the Shenxian Zhuan and several other books during the Jianwu 建武 era (317–318), when Emperor Yuan of Jin founded the Eastern Jin dynasty.

In all I wrote 著 [Baopuzi] neipian 內篇 in twenty chapters, [Baopuzi] waipian in fifty chapters, one hundred chapters of inscriptions 碑, eulogies 頌, poems 詩, and rhapsodies 賦 and thirty chapters of military dispatches 軍書, proclamations 檄移, memorials to the throne 章表, and memoranda 箋記. I also compiled 撰 biographies of those not listed as a matter of course – Shenxian Zhuan 神仙傳 – in ten chapters and biographies of those who in their nobility refused office – Yinyi zhuan隱逸傳 – in ten chapters. In addition, I made an anthology of three hundred and ten chapters of military affairs 兵事, techniques 方伎, miscellaneous entries 短雜 and oddities 奇要 by copying excerpts 抄 from the five classics, the seven histories and the one hundred philosophers, and made a table of contents.

Compare other translations of this ambiguous description of the Shenxian Zhuan:

- "I also compiled a book on those who are not normally listed, which became the Shen hsien chuan in 10 scrolls."
- "In addition, he composed writings in which the common people (among the scholar class) were not interested, including the Shen-hsien chuan 神仙傳, in ten chapters."
- "I also compiled biographies which are not passed down among the common people – Shenxian Zhuan – in ten chapters."
- "I also compiled (zhuan 撰) traditions of those not conventionally listed to form Shenxian Zhuan in ten fascicles."

Ge Hong specifically uses the verb zhuan 撰 "compose; write; compile" for the Shenxian Zhuan and Yinyi Zhuan "Biographies of Recluses", which is no longer extant. Thus, Durrant writes, "Most of the biographies are extracted from various earlier works, so Ko is really much more of an editor than an author of Shen-hsien chuan."

Several early sources confirm that Ge Hong wrote the Shenxian Zhuan. The (ca. 429) Sanguozhi commentary by Pei Songzhi (372-451) quotes the Shenxian Zhuan and notes "what was recorded by Ge Hong came close to deluding the masses. But as his writings are so widely circulated, I have selected a few of the events." Liu Xiujing 陸修靜's (437) List of Lingbao texts states that Ge Hong "selected and compiled" the Shenxian Zhuan. The Shui Jing Zhu "Commentary on the Waterways Classic" by Li Daoyuan (d. 527) also attributes the Shenxian Zhuan to Ge. The (6th century) biography of the Shangqing School patriarch Tao Hongjing (456-536) says he "obtained Ge Hong's Shenxian Zhuan and studied it day and night and so mastered its ideas on nourishing life." Campany concludes,

We can therefore be as confident that Ge Hong compiled a work titled Shenxian Zhuan as we can of almost any other authorial attribution in this period of Chinese history. But it is equally certain that the Shenxian Zhuan that has come down to us is not exactly the text that Ge Hong wrote.

Some scholars have questioned Ge's authorship of the Shenxian Zhuan based on textual inconsistencies, particularly with Ge's Baopuzi neipian. Arthur Waley doubted that Ge Hong wrote both the Baopuzi (Inner Chapter 16), and Shenxian Zhuan biographies about Cheng Wei 程偉, whose physiognomy caused his wife to refuse teaching him alchemy.

Not only is the style strangely different, but the Shen Hsien Chuan version is so meagre and so incompetently told that one doubts whether the author of it is even trying to pass himself off as Ko Hung. It seems indeed likely that the Shen Hsien Chuan, though a work of the fourth century, was merely an anonymous series of Taoist biographies, which some mistaken person labeled as Ko Hung's Shen Hsien Chuan and divided into ten chapters.

Kominami Ichirō analyzed the principles for immortality in Ge's two books.

For Ge Hong in Baopuzi achieving immortality is a technical problem in which self-reliance is paramount. The stories in the Shenxian Zhuan, on the other hand, depict the attainment of immortality as a process based on submission and complete faith in a teacher who bestows the means of immortality on proven disciples. In this Iatter version, immortality does not come from within oneself, but is derived from external sources.

Kominami hypothesized that Shangqing School editors revised the Shenxian Zhuan from Ge's original text to emphasize their belief in external powers, but Penny finds Kominami's evidence "unconvincing both for the existence of an "original" and its stance on the attainability of immortality." Campany faults arguments against Ge Hong's authorship of the Shenxian Zhuan for committing two fallacies.

One is the fallacy of textual holism: the assumption that if one or a small number of passages are problematic, then the overall attribution of authorship must be in error. … The other fallacy is that of an assumption of consistency, that texts by a single author, whenever they were written during his lifetime, must have originally been completely consistent in their values and priorities as well as in how they handle specific figures, techniques, and events.

Since the Shenxian Zhuan is a compilation of biographies from various sources, textual inconsistencies are predictable.

== Textual versions ==
During the Sui (581-618), Tang (618-907), and Song Dynasties (960-1279), the Shenxian Zhuan was widely known and extensively quoted. Song editions of the Daozang included the text, but copies were lost when Mongol Yuan dynasty officials burned "apocryphal" Daoist books in 1258-59 and 1280–81. The 1444 Ming dynasty Daozang "Daoist canon" does not contain a complete version of the Shenxian Zhuan, and most received texts were compiled during the Qing dynasty. Scholars have long suspected, writes Barrett, that "the best-known version currently available was actually confected for commercial rather than academic purposes in the sixteenth century from quotations in other sources, and that the direct tradition of the text has been lost."

Some editions of the Shenxian Zhuan have different numbers and arrangements of biographies. Modern versions contain around ninety biographies, which differs from Tang-era versions. Zhang Shoujie 張守節's 736 commentary to the Shiji lists 69 biographies. The Buddhist scholar Liang Su 梁肅 (753-793) reported that the text had 190 biographies. According to Penny, "The unfortunate but inescapable conclusion derived from this text is that modern versions of Shenxian Zhuan are possibly less than half the size of an 8th Century version of Shenxian zhuan, and there is no reliable way of determining which biographies have been lost".

Modern Shenxian Zhuan texts exist in several ten-chapter versions, one five-chapter version (1868 Yiyuan junhua 藝苑捃華), and various one-chapter abstracts. Two ten-chapter versions are commonly available, but neither, concludes Penny, "is entirely satisfactory". First, the 1794 Longwei mishu 龍威秘書 edition, which stems from the 1592 Guang Han Wei congshu 廣漢魏叢書 version recompiled from sources including Taiping guangji 太平廣記 quotations, contains 92 hagiographies. Second, the 1782 Siku Quanshu 四庫全書 edition, which stems from the 1641 Jiguge 汲古閣 edition published by Mao Jin 毛晉, contains 84 hagiographies. The best known one-chapter Ming dynasty versions of the Shenxian zhuan include the ca. 1620 Yimen guangdu 夷門廣牘 and 1646 Shuofu 說郛 versions.

== Textual dating ==
Dating "the original" Shenxian Zhuan text is impossible because its transmission stopped after the Southern Song dynasty (1127–1279) book burnings. Campany concludes,

We can be certain neither that Ge Hong himself wrote even the earliest-attested passages nor that he did not write event he latest attested. What we can be certain of is the date by which each passage existed and was attributed to the Shenxian Zhuan. … Based on these criteria, we can conclude that material concerning 15 adepts is reliably attributed to the Shenxian Zhuan before the year 500, that material about an additional 70 figures is reliably attributed to Shenxian Zhuan by 650, 9 more figures by 700, 22 more by the year 1000, and so on. Imagining these groups of material arranged in concentric circles by source, the earliest at the center, one quickly sees that there is a substantial body of hagiographic text occupying the inner rings, attributable with relative confidence to Shenxian Zhuan and securely datable to the late Tang or earlier. Hence, of the total of 196 hagiographies (in whole or fragmentary form) included in my translation, some percentage of at least 87 is attested in Tang or earlier texts.

Based upon detailed analysis of Shenxian Zhuan editions and fragments, Stephan Peter Bumbacher confirms the possibility that the text "indeed is from Ge Hong's brush"; however, if it is a forgery, "then it must have been fabricated in the time between Ge Hong's death and the earliest testimonies in the early 5th century, most probably during the first decades after his decease."

== Translations ==
The earliest English translations from the Shenxian Zhuan, for instance, Lionel Giles or Eva Wong, were only of selected biographies. Robert Campany wrote the first full translation, which many reviewers have praised. For example, "monumental", "a giant leap forward in our understanding of the religious world of early medieval China", and "magisterial".

Campany's book is more than a critical annotated translation; it is also a painstaking reconstruction of the textual strata. He analyzed Shenxian Zhuan quotations in some forty sources dating from the fifth to seventeenth centuries, and chronologically recompiled them into three groups. Group A are biographies fully attested in works until the end of the Tang dynasty (618-907), Group B are those only mentioned in these sources, and Group C are those ascribed to the Shenxian Zhuan only since the Song dynasty (960-1279).

Reviewers have criticized some of Campany's translations for disregarding conventions (e.g., "traditions" for zhuan "biographies" noted above). For instance, he translates shijie 尸解 (lit. "corpse separation") as "escape by means of a simulated corpse". This obscure Daoist term, usually translated "liberation from the corpse" or "corpse liberation", refers to a method of xian transformation involving a substitute corpse to fake death. Other shijie translations include "release by means of a corpse", "one's soul leaves the body and becomes an immortal after death", and "dissolve bodily into a spirit". Campany lists common elements in Shenxian Zhuan narratives involving shijie transcendence. Employing bianhua simulation of death, an adept will typically pretend to become ill, feign death, and be buried. Later he or she is seen alive, always at a distant place, and when the coffin is opened, instead of a corpse, it contains some other object (talisman, sword, clothing, etc.). Adepts will occasionally change their names as a device to elude detection by spirits in the underworld bureaucracy. In the Baopuzi, Ge Hong ranked shijiexian 尸解仙 "escape by means of a simulated corpse transcendents" as the lowest of three categories, below tianxian 天仙 "celestial transcendents" who ascend into the heavens and dixian 地仙 "earthbound transcendents" who wander in the mountains.

== Significance ==
Campany lists four reasons for studying the Shenxian Zhuan.

For one thing, Ge Hong's works afford us an unparalleled glimpse into certain aspects of Chinese religious life and practice at a critical time in the history of Chinese religions. … For another thing, Ge Hong records elements of religious ideas and disciplines relating to the quest for transcendence that might otherwise remain unknown to us, and his writings constitute a valuable terminus ante quem for them. … With respect to Daoist religious history proper, furthermore, Ge Hong's writings, and the practices, ideas, and values represented in them, constitute an important voice in ongoing inter- or intrareligious rivalries and self-definitions. … Finally, research on Ge Hong's works has at least two contributions to make to the cross-cultural study of religions. The religion he documents was an extraordinary human response to the phenomenon of death. … [and contributes] new material for an as yet unrealized cross-cultural understanding of hagiography as a type of religious writing, a theme in religious studies heretofore largely dominated by Christian and Islamic categories.

Penny summarizes why the Shenxian Zhuan is important.

The biographies provide a wealth of information about how immortality was viewed in early medieval China, detailing important features of how immortals, and those who sought immortality, lived, their extraordinary abilities, their relationship to other people and society at large, including government at all levels, the way they interacted with other spiritual beings, the drugs they concocted, and how they transformed their environments for themselves.
