= Sun Hanhua =

Sun Hanhua 孫寒華

Personal life
- Born: Unknown Fuchun County, Yangzhou, Eastern Wu
- Died: Unknown Mount Maoshan, Eastern Wu (legendary)
- Parent: Sun Xi (father)
- Dynasty: Eastern Wu

Religious life
- Religion: Taoism
- Temple: Maoshan Chongxi Temple

Senior posting
- Post: Taoist Practitioner
- Period in office: Three Kingdoms period
- Disciples: Chen Shijing, various others
- Dynasty: Eastern Wu

Sun Hanhua (孫寒華, birth and death dates unknown) was a female Taoist during the Three Kingdoms period in the state of Eastern Wu, which was located in present-day China. She hailed from Fuchun County in Yangzhou, Wu Commandery. Her grandfather was Sun Ben, a distant cousin of Sun Quan (the founder of Eastern Wu) while her father was Sun Xi. She was said to have been a disciple of Du Qi.

Sun Hanhua is a semi-legendary figure linked to Taoist traditions during the Three Kingdoms period. She does not appear in the Records of the Three Kingdoms, and most accounts of her come from later legends and secondary historical sources. Some traditions claim she achieved immortality at Hualao Mountain and identify her as a granddaughter of the founder of Eastern Wu.

== Legends ==
In her youth, Sun Hanhua shared a deep affection with Li Du, who held the position of the Commandant of Trustworthiness. The two of them eloped to Jian'an (modern-day Jianning County, Fujian), seeking refuge with Zhang Yi, a relative of Li Du, to escape from the turmoil. After the situation had settled, they chose to live in seclusion on Mount Maoshan.

As Li Du honed his skills in Taoist arts under the guidance of Jie Yan, Sun Hanhua, along with Chen Shijing, became disciples of Li Du and learned the ways of Taoism from him. Sun Hanhua was said to have retained her youthful appearance thanks to a technique called the "Xuanbai Method." This method, which involved the circulation of dark energy within the mud pellet, white energy within the heart, and yellow energy within the navel throughout the body from dawn until noon, allowed her to maintain her youthful appearance. As the "Xuanbai Method" prohibited sexual relations, Sun Hanhua abstained from such activities even when alone with Li Du.

Sun Hanhua and her fellow disciples sometimes descended from the mountains to trade for clothing and food in nearby villages, but people were completely unaware of their true identities. It is said that Sun Hanhua traveled through various mountains of Wu for over a decade and eventually ascended into the sky from Huahua Mountain, becoming an immortal.

Sun Hanhua, Zhang Jiangzi (sister of Zhang Ji), Li Huigu (wife of Xiahou Xuan), Shi Shunü (daughter of Zhu Ji), and Zheng Tiansheng (mother of Deng Zhi) were all renowned female Taoists known for their virtuous deeds during that era.

== Xuanbai Method ==
The Xuanbai Method involved circulating dark energy within a mud pellet, white energy within the heart, and yellow energy within the navel throughout the body from dawn until noon. By understanding white to protect black and black to protect white, this technique was believed to achieve eternal life and the elimination of all malevolent forces. Taboos included consuming the meat of the six domestic animals (horses, cattle, sheep, pigs, dogs, and chickens) and the five pungent vegetables (onions, garlic chives, garlic, hot leeks, and peppers). Additionally, it was forbidden to share a sleeping space with family members or engage in sexual relations.

== Sources ==
- Tao Hongjing, "Zhen Gao" (The True Instructions), Translated and Annotated, Part Three.
