= Tao Hongjing =

Chinese Taoist, polymath, writer, alchemist and astronomer (456-536)

Tao Hongjing 陶弘景 other names
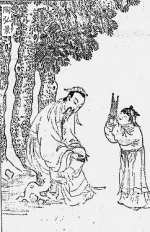
- Daoist master Tao Hongjing
- Born: 30 April 456; Jiankang, Liu Song dynasty (modern-day Nanjing, Jiangsu)
- Died: 19 April 536 (aged 79); Jiankang, Liang dynasty
- Occupations: Alchemist, astronomer, calligrapher, military general, musician, physician, pharmacologist, writer

Chinese name
- Chinese: 陶弘景
Transcriptions
Standard Mandarin
- Hanyu Pinyin: Táo Hóngjǐng
- Wade–Giles: T'ao Hung-ching

Tongming (courtesy name)
- Chinese: 通明
Transcriptions
Standard Mandarin
- Hanyu Pinyin: Tōngmíng
- Wade–Giles: T'ung-ming

Huayang Yinju (pseudonym)
- Traditional Chinese: 華陽隱居
- Simplified Chinese: 华阳隐居
Transcriptions
Standard Mandarin
- Hanyu Pinyin: Huáyáng Yǐnjū
- Wade–Giles: Hua-yang Yin-chü

Tao Hongjing (456–536), courtesy name Tongming, was a Chinese alchemist, astronomer, calligrapher, military general, musician, physician, and pharmacologist during the Northern and Southern dynasties period. A polymathic individual of many talents, he was best known as a founder of the Shangqing "Highest Clarity" School of Taoism and the compiler-editor of the basic Shangqing scriptures.

== Biography ==
There are a variety of sources about Tao Hongjing's life, from his own writings to biographies in the official Twenty-Four Histories. The British sinologist Lionel Giles said Tao's "versatility was amazing: scholar, philosopher, calligraphist, musician, alchemist, pharmacologist, astronomer, he may be regarded as the Chinese counterpart of Leonardo da Vinci".

=== Secular life ===
Tao Hongjing was born in Moling (秣陵, present-day Jiangning District, Nanjing, Jiangsu), which was near the Northern and Southern dynasties period capital Jiankang (present-day Nanjing). His father Tao Zhenbao (陶貞寶) and paternal grandfather Tao Long (陶隆) were erudite scholars, skilled calligraphers, and experts in Chinese herbology. His mother Lady Hao (郝夫人) and maternal grandfather were devout Buddhists.

Tao was a prodigious reader and once his interest was aroused in a subject, he would not stop until he had learned all that he could. According to official biographies, he read the Daoist hagiography Shenxian zhuan ("Biographies of the Divine Transcendents") at the age of ten, whereupon he decided to become a yǐnshì (隱士 "recluse; hermit").

Tao Hongjing held several court positions under the Liu Song (420–479), Southern Qi (479–502), and Liang (502–587) dynasties. When Tao was about twenty-five, Xiao Daocheng (蕭道成), the future Emperor Gao (r. 479–482) founder of the Southern Qi dynasty, appointed him as tutor for the imperial princes Xiao Ye (蕭曅, 467–494) and Xiao Gao (蕭暠, 468–491). After Tao's father died in 481, he resigned office to observe the customary three-year period of filial mourning. However, Gao's successor, Emperor Wu of Southern Qi (r. 482–493), appointed him as tutor for his son prince Xiao Jian (蕭鏗, 477–494) in 482, and designated him as General of the Left Guard of the Palace in 483. Tao's mother died in 484, and he resigned from office.

During the period of mourning for his mother from 484 to 486, Tao Hongjing studied with the Taoist master Sun Youyue (孫遊岳, 399–489), who had been a disciple of Lu Xiujing (陸修靜, 406–477), the standardizer of the Lingbao School scriptures and ritual. Tao received training in chanting the scriptures and drawing talismans. Sun showed him some manuscripts of the original "Shangqing [or Maoshan] revelations", in which Tao became fascinated. According to tradition, these revelations were dictated to Yang Xi (330–c. 386), when he was on Maoshan between 364 and 370 and had repeated spiritual visions of Taoist deities from the Heaven of Upper Clarity (namely, Shangqing 上清). Tao made his first visit to Maoshan (Mount Mao, 茅山) west of Jintan. This mountain was originally called Gouqushan 句曲山, which is the name of a Taoist grotto-heaven in Lake Tai, Jiangsu. Tao travelled eastward to Zhejiang to begin collecting the original revelatory manuscripts in 490.

=== Reclusion on Maoshan ===
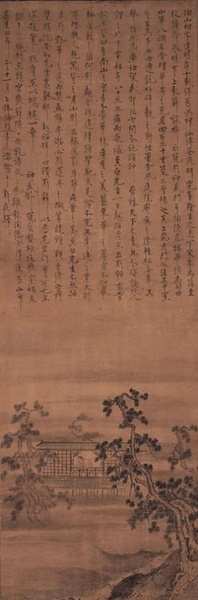
Tao Hongjing Listening to the Pines, 1442 (Muromachi Period), Yamanashi Prefectural Museum

In 492, at the age of 36, Tao Hongjing resigned his official post at court and withdrew to focus upon scholarship and alchemical experimentation on Maoshan. Emperor Wu sponsored the construction of a three-storied thatched hermitage called Huayang guan (華陽館, "Abbey of Flourishing Yang"). Beginning in 497, Emperor Ming of Southern Qi commissioned Tao to experiment with sword making for the imperial family, and provided him monthly with five pounds of fu-ling mushroom and two pints of white honey so that he could undertake experiments in Taoist dietetics. Tao finished compiling the Shangqing revelatory manuscripts, and edited them into the c. 499 Zhen'gao (真誥, "Declarations of the Perfected") compendium. He also began travelling to famous mountains in search of medical plants and elixirs.

Tao Hongjing and Xiao Yan 蕭衍 (464–549), the founder of the Liang dynasty (502–587), were old friends. At the end of the Qi dynasty Tao presented Xiao with a prognostication text that confirmed he was the legitimate successor to the Qi. When Xiao Yan ascended the throne as Emperor Wu of Liang (r. 502–549) he treated Tao Hongjing with great respect. Note: Tao served under two rulers named Wudi (武帝, Martial Emperor), Emperor Wu of Southern Qi and Emperor Wu of Liang; in order to avoid confusion, the latter one will be called '"Xiao Yan". In 514, Xiao Yan ordered the Zhuyang guan (朱陽館, Abbey of Vermilion Yang) state-sponsored hermitage to be built on Maoshan and Tao installed himself in the following year. The emperor kept up a regular correspondence with Tao, often visited Maoshan to consult on important matters of state, and gave him the title Shanzhong zaixiang (山中宰相, "Grand Councilor of the Mountains"). The devout Buddhist Xiao Yan provided Tao with financial support, exempted his Shangqing school from the anti-Taoist decrees of 504 and 517. In 504, Xiao Yan commissioned Tao to undertake alchemical experiments, and provided him with the required minerals.

Between 508 and 512, Tao journeyed throughout the southeast, in the modern provinces of Fujian, Zhejiang, and Fuzhou, in order to continue making alchemical experiments in the mountains. During his travels Tao met the visionary Zhou Ziliang 周子良 (497–516), who became his disciple. For 18 months, Zhou recorded his spiritual visions from some of the same Maoshan divinities seen by Yang Xi, but they informed Zhou that his destiny was to become an immortal, and he committed ritual suicide with a poisonous elixir composed of mushrooms and cinnabar and died from Chinese alchemical elixir poisoning. Tao found Zhou's manuscripts hidden in a Maoshan grotto, and edited them into the Zhoushi mingtong ji (周氏冥通記, "Record of Master Zhou's Communications with the Unseen"), which he presented to Xiao Yan in 517.

Little is known about the last two decades of Tao's life. His only literary works from this period are two stele inscriptions, one devoted to Xu Mai 許邁 (300–348, a patron of Yang Xi), dating from 518, and one to Ge Xuan, dating from 522. From about 520 until his death in 536 at Maoshan, Tao Hongjing spent much of his time trying to make alchemical elixirs.

=== Names ===
Like other Chinese scholar-officials, Tao Hongjing had several names. His surname Tao (陶, lit. "pottery") is fairly common and his given name combines hóng (弘 "grand; magnificent; vast") and jǐng (景 "view; scene, scenery"). Tao chose Tongming (通明, Brightly Lit) for his courtesy name and Huayang Yinju (華陽隱居, "Recluse of Flourishing Yang", referring to the name of his Maoshan abbey) for his pseudonym. Tao Hongjing's contemporaries called him Shanzhong zaixiang (山中宰相, Grand Councilor from the Mountains). He received the posthumous names Zhenbai (貞白, "Integrity") or Zhenbai Xiansheng (貞白先生, "Master Integrity") and Huayang Zhenren (華陽真人, Holy man of Flourishing Yang). Xiao Yan granted him the posthumous title Zhongsan Dafu (中散大夫, "Grand Master of Palace Leisure"). During the Tang dynasty Tao was posthumously made the ninth patriarch of the Shangqing lineage.

== Literary works ==
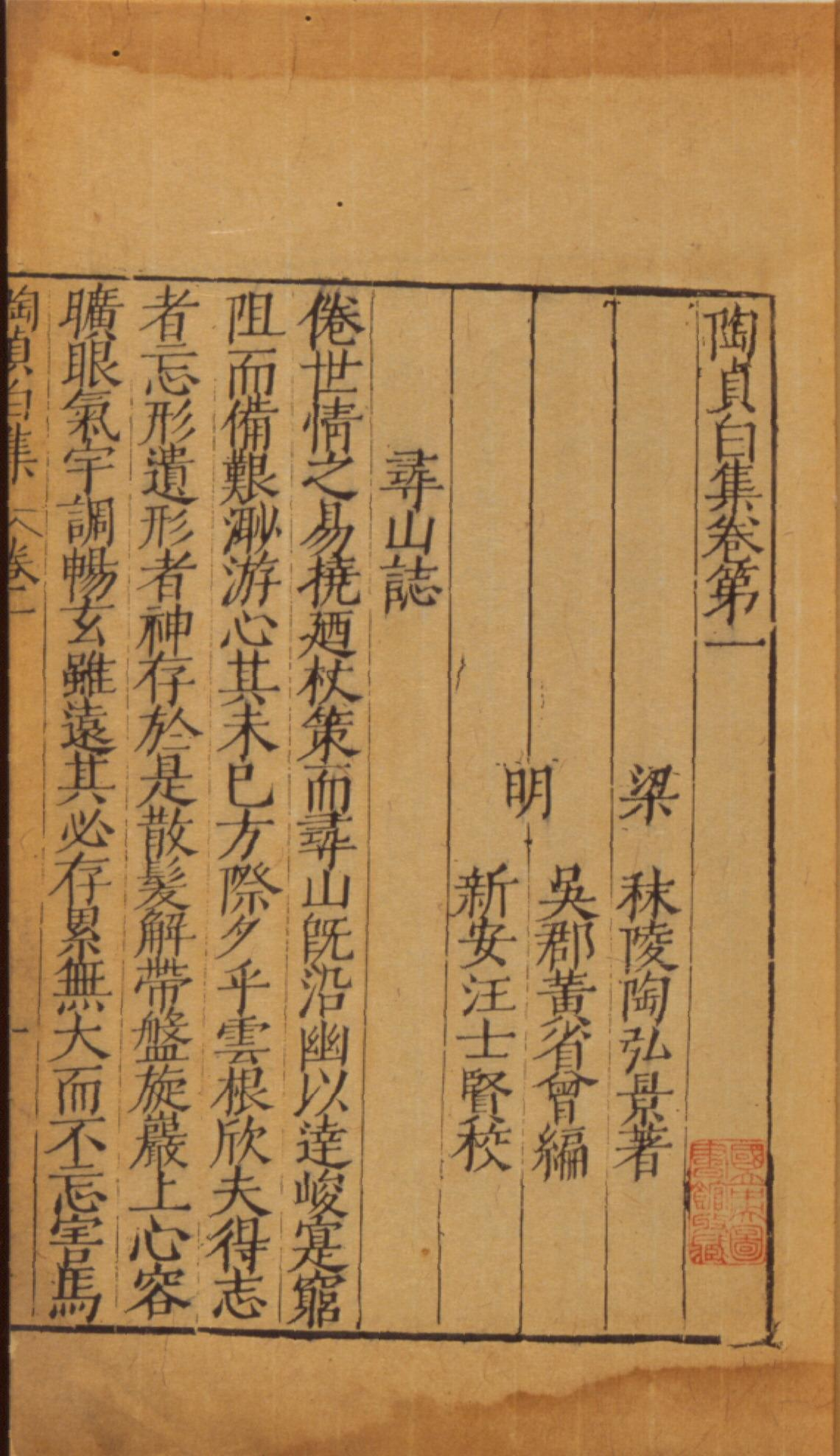
Xunshan zhi (尋山志, "Rhapsody on Exploring the Mountains") that Tao Hongming wrote at the age of fifteen, Ming dynasty (1573–1620) edition

Tao Hongjing's literary career began at the age of fifteen with his 471 fu-like Xunshan zhi (尋山志, "Rhapsody on Exploring the Mountains"). In his youth, Tao also wrote essays, commentaries, and began compiling a 1000-volume compendium of knowledge, the Xueyuan (學園, "Garden of Learning").

Tao Hongjing was a prolific writer and had extensive knowledge of the Chinese classics, history, literature, numerology, astrology, geography, and traditional Chinese medicine. He compiled some fifty works, such as the Gujin zhoujun ji (古今州郡記, "Notes on ancient and modern provinces and commanderies") and Lunyu jizhu (論語集注, "Collected commentaries on the Lunyu").

In Six Dynasties poetry, Tao Hongjing's best known poem was written in reply to Xiao Yan's question, "Is there anything in the mountains?" It expresses his intention of being a recluse and not leaving the mountains.

You asked me "Is there anything in the mountains",
There are many white clouds above the mountain ridge.
They can only be admired and enjoyed by myself,
But they are not worth holding in my hands and presenting to you, my lord.

The Siku quanshu collection includes three works by Tao Hongjing, the Zhen'gao (真誥, "Declarations of the perfected"), Gujin daojian lu (古今刀劍錄, "Register of ancient and recent swords"), and Zhenling weiye tu (真靈位業圖, "Chart of the Ranks and Functions of the Perfected Immortals"), which was the first Daoist work about theogony.

The Daozang (Daoist Canon) contains many of Tao Hongjing's works, such as the Zhen'gao, Huayang Tao Yinju Ji (華陽陶隱居集, "Hermit Tao's Flourishing Yang Writings"), and Yangxing Yanming Lu (養性延命錄, "Extracts on Nourishing Spiritual Nature and Prolonging Bodily Life").

== Religion ==
Tao Hongjing was educated in Daoist traditions associated with the Daode jing, Zhuangzi, and Ge Hong's writings on seeking immortality. Around 486, Tao received initiation into Lingbao School of Daoism from his master Sun Youyue. He advocated the synthesis of the three teachings (Confucianism, Daoism, and Buddhism) and was initiated into Buddhism in Ningbo. His Maoshan refuge had two halls, one Daoist and one Buddhist, and Tao alternated his worship rituals on a daily basis.

=== Buddhism ===
Tao Hongjing continued his interests in Buddhism and formally took vows in 513. Tanluan (475–542), the founder of Pure Land Buddhism in China, reportedly studied Daoism and herbalism under Tao. Some architectural elements from Tao's tomb, discovered on Maoshan during the Cultural Revolution, bear an inscription calling him "a disciple of the Buddha and of the Most High Lord Lao[zi]".

=== Daoism ===
Tao Hongjing was effectively the founder of the Shangqing or Maoshan School (Maoshan zong 茅山宗). From 483, Tao became interested in the Shangqing revelations granted to Yang Xi more than a century earlier and decided to collect the original autograph manuscripts, using calligraphy as one of the criteria to establish their authenticity. He began to gather the manuscripts from Daoists living on Maoshan in 488 and his major acquisitions date from that year to 490 when he travelled to Zhejiang. When Tao retired to Maoshan in 492 he intended to edit the manuscripts, drawing inspiration from Gu Huan's (顧歡, 425?–488?) now-lost Zhenji jing (真跡經, "Scripture on the Traces of the Perfected"), an earlier but in Tao's view unsatisfying account of Yang Xi's revelations. In 498–99, supported by the emperor, Tao compiled and fully annotated the manuscripts. His enterprise resulted in two major works, the esoteric c. 493 Dengzhen yinjue (登真隱訣, "Concealed Instructions for the Ascent to Perfection") and the c. 499 Zhen'gao ("Declarations of the Perfected"), which was intended for wide circulation. Tao also compiled a complete catalogue of Shangqing texts, which is no longer extant. Moreover, the Shangqing revelations inspired Tao to compose a commentary to one of the texts received by Yang Xi, the Jianjing (劍經, "Scripture of the Sword"), which is included in the Taiping Yulan. Later, in 517, Tao edited the Zhoushi mingtong ji (周氏冥通記, "Records of Mr. Zhou's Communications with the Unseen") based on his autograph manuscripts from the revelations bestowed upon his disciple Zhou Ziliang, who had committed suicide in 516 after receiving successive visions of the Perfected.

== Science ==
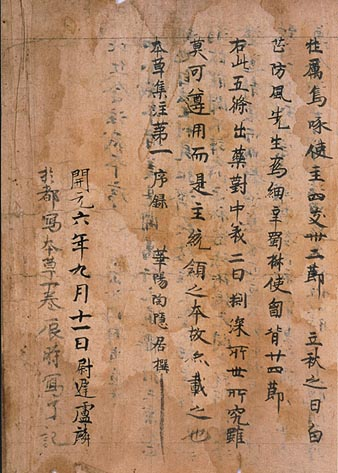
Dunhuang manuscript of preface to Tao Hongjing's Bencao jizhu (本草集注, Collected Commentaries to the Shennong Ben Cao Jing), dated 718

The sinologist Roger Greatrex describes Ge Hong and Tao Hongjing as "early scientists" who made numerous observations of natural phenomena, which they attempted to accord with the Five Elements theory. In modern terms, Tao experimented with protoscience rather than the scientific method. His methodology and results have significance in the history of science in China. Tao's pharmacological commentary uses the termyàn (驗, "examine; test; verify") to denote medical efficacy of substances.

=== Pharmacology ===
Tao Hongjing's father and grandfather were experts in herbal drugs, and he shared their interests in pharmacopoeia and medicine. Shortly after compiling the c. 499 Zhen'gao he completed a major work of pharmacology: the Bencao jing jizhu (本草經集注, "Collected Commentaries to the Materia Medica"), which was a critical reedition of the Han dynasty Shennong Bencao Jing attributed to Shennong, the legendary inventor of agriculture and pharmacology. Although Tao's original commentary is no longer extant, it is widely quoted in later materia medica, and portions were discovered in the Dunhuang manuscripts.

Tao's preface explains that beginning in the Wei-Jin period, copies of the Shennong bencao jing text had become corrupted, and contemporary medical practitioners "are not able to clearly comprehend information and as a result their knowledge has become shallow". He further explains that his commentary combines previous material from the Shengnong bencao jing (which Tao refers to as Benjing) and other early pharmacological sources, material from his Mingyi bielu (名醫別錄, "Supplementary Records of Famous Physicians"), and information gathered from alchemical texts, notably what he calls xianjing (仙經, "classics on immortality elixirs") and daoshu (道書, "books on Daoist techniques"). While the early pharmacopeia had only graded substances into superior, medium and inferior, Tao rearranged them into a classification that continues to be used today: minerals, trees and plants, insects and animals, fruits, cultivated vegetables, and grains. For each substance in the Bencao jing jizhu, Tao gives information on the availability, sources, alternative nomenclature, appearance, similarities and confusions, suitability for medicinal usage, effectiveness, quotations from classical and other sources, and errors in existing texts. Tao is considered "the effective founder of critical pharmacology in China", and his editions and commentaries were "painstaking productions, using, for example, different colored inks to distinguish text, original annotations, and his own editorial additions".

In addition, he wrote other pharmacological texts including Tao Yinju Bencao (陶隱居本草, "Hermit Tao's Pharmacopeia"), Yao Zongjue (藥總訣, "General Medicinal Formulae"), and Yangsheng Yanming Lu (養生延命錄, "Extracts on Nourishing Spiritual Nature and Prolonging Bodily Life").

=== External alchemy ===
In 497, Emperor Ming assigned Tao Hongjing to experiment with sword foundry, and provided him with an assistant, Huang Wenqing (黃文慶) a blacksmith from the imperial workshops, who became a Shangqing initiate in 505. The Chinese associated metallurgy with alchemy, both of which used furnaces.

Around 504, Tao changed to researching waidan (lit. "outer alchemy", preparing herbal and chemical elixirs of immortality), and studied several methods that he successively discarded because of unavailable ingredients, even with imperial support. Eventually, in 505, he decided to compound the jiuzhuan huandan (九轉還丹, Reverted Elixir in Nine Cycles). In spite of long research and preparatory work, the compounding failed twice, on New Year's Day 506 and 507. Tao blamed these failures on the lack of genuine isolation, since Maoshan had a large community of permanent residents and their families as well as numerous visitors on pilgrimages. Disappointed, Tao decided to leave Maoshan incognito and engaged in a five-year journey to the southeast, from 508 to 512. Another attempt to produce the elixir failed during those years. The History of the Southern Dynasties records that Tao eventually managed to compound a white powder elixir.

[Tao Hongjing] had obtained supernatural talismans and secret instructions. He considered that he might succeed in achieving an elixir, but was hindered by the lack of ingredients. The emperor supplied him with gold, cinnabar, malachite, realgar, and the rest, and he subsequently compounded a Sublimated Elixir (feidan 飛丹). It was the color of frost or snow, and when ingested made the body weightless. When the emperor had consumed this elixir, there were confirmatory effects, and he honored Tao all the more.
