= Shangqing School =

Daoist movement

The Shangqing School (Chinese:上清), also known as Supreme Clarity, Highest Clarity, or Supreme Purity, is a Daoist movement that began during the aristocracy of the Western Jin dynasty. Shangqing can be translated as either 'Supreme Clarity' or 'Highest Clarity.' The first leader of the school was a woman, Wei Huacun (251-334). According to her Shangqing hagiographers, her devotion to Daoist cultivation so impressed a number of immortals that she received revelations from them: 31 volumes of Daoist scriptures which would become the foundation of Shangqing Daoism. Later, Tao Hongjing, a man, (Chinese: 陶弘景) (456－536) structured the theory and practice and compiled the canon. He greatly contributed to the development of the school that took place near the end of the 5th century. The mountain near Nanjing where Tao Hongjing had his retreat, Maoshan (茅山 – fr), today remains the principal seat of the school.

Shangqing practice values meditation techniques of visualization and breathing, as well as physical exercises, as opposed to the use of alchemy and talismans common in other Daoist practises. The recitation of the sacred canon plays an equally important role. The practice was essentially individualistic, contrary to the collective practices in the Celestial Master school or in the Lingbao School. Recruiting from high social classes, during the Tang dynasty, Shangqing was the dominant school of Daoism, and its influence is found in literature of the time period. The importance of the school only began to diminish in the second half of the Song dynasty. Under the Yuan dynasty, the movement was known by the name Maoshan and the focus changed from meditation to rituals and talismans. In the 21st century, Maoshan Daoism is still practiced but its current techniques and beliefs differ from the original values of the school.

== History ==
Lady Wei Huacun, an aristocrat from the Jin dynasty and a Celestial Master practitioner, was the first leader of the Shangqing School.

Three decades after her death, from 364 to 370, Yang Xi (330-c. 386) was believed to have had revelations "aided almost certainly by cannabis" (Joseph Needham 1980:213) and "received...scriptural and hagiographic literature" from zhenren xian who brought him into a visitation experience. These texts eventually formed the basis of the school’s beliefs. The immortals and spirits that appeared to him were from "the heaven of Shang-ch'ing" and stated that Imperial China and all other governments in the world would end and be replaced by a theocratic Taoist empire.

The school at this time believed that the 4th century was a time of sin and divine trials brought on by six evil and demonic tiān realms called the Six Heavens in English and during the apocalypse which would come in the year 392, "the earth was to be cleansed of evildoers by a cataclysm of fire and flood." The good people of the world would be safe from this because of the power of the "luminous caverns of the perfected" beneath divine mountains like Maoshan, and Lord Li Hung would descend from heaven to rule the world afterwards.

The revelation began to spread in aristocratic circles of South China, and eventually Tao Hongjing, advisor to the princes of Qi, joined the group. He commented upon, and compiled the Shangqing texts, and developed a well-structured system consisting of a pantheon and new ways to reach immortality that depended upon meditation. More interested in Daoism and Buddhism than in public administration, in 492 he received authorization to leave the court. He moved to Maoshan, which had by now become the center of the school. There, with the help of the Emperor Wudi of the Liang dynasty, he built the temple of Huayang, the first Shangqing temple.

After his death, the school continued to prosper, and recruited many people from the aristocracy. From its beginning near Nanjing, the school expanded to the north after laws passed in 504 and 517 forced several masters of the school to go into exile. Ironically this expulsion helped spread the movement to the north, and did little to weaken the schools organization in the south. The Daoist encyclopedia published under the patronage of the Emperor Wu of the Northern Zhou (561-578) placed a great deal of importance on the Shangqing texts.

The Shangqing School dominated the Daoist movements under the Tang. During this period, all of its leaders received a title from the emperor. Emperor Taizong personally visited three of the temples on Maoshan, and in 731 the Xuanzong emperor put Shangqing deities in charge of China’s sacred mountains. The Daoist section of the imperial encyclopedia was composed primarily of Shangqing texts.

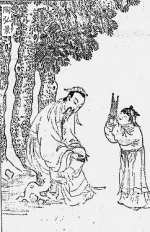
Tao Hongjing, responsible for the compilation of Shangqing texts.

At the same time, the Shangqing school underwent a transformation and integrated texts from the Lingbao School as well as from the Way of the Celestial Master school. The clergy also became more important and more emphasis was put on public rituals.

During the second half of the Northern Song dynasty, the influence of Shangqing Daoism declined at the court, but still remained, changing its focus to rituals and talismans. New buildings appeared on Maoshan that survived until the Cultural Revolution of Mao Zedong. Under the Song, some of the Shangqing leaders still benefited from imperial favour such as the 23rd leader, Zhu Ziying (974–1029), who received the title of ‘national master’ from the court. The 35th and 44th masters, Ren Yuanpu and Wang Daomeng, were equally distinguished for having ended a grasshopper invasion and a flood. Under the Yuan dynasty, the Shangqing school integrated itself under the Zhengyi alliance. At the end of the 20th century, the Taiping Rebellion, the Japanese army and the Cultural Revolution have resulted in the complete destruction of the temples on Maoshan. Two of the temples, Jiuxiaogong and Yuanfugong have been rebuilt more for tourists than for religious purposes.

== Practices ==
Shangqing Daoism has borrowed many concepts and beliefs from both the Celestial Masters as well as from Ge Hong’s alchemical tradition. However, the absorption of elixirs and other potions aimed to attain immortality was largely replaced in the Song period by internal alchemy that was more linked to meditation techniques (see the Zuowanglun).

An emphasis was placed on personal meditation in the Shangqing school, unlike the ritualized system of the Celestial Masters. Shangqing meditation was largely a solitary affair, and focused on mental visualization of spirits and gods. There was also no requirement to meditate at a temple; one’s own home was fine. Deities lived inside the body and could provide good health if meditated upon. Each deity inhabited a different part of the body. Through studying the descriptions of deities in the canon, adepts would contemplate the inside of their body and maintain the deities in their proper place. This would ensure the body’s durability. While it began as a school centered on the individual, the school changed progressively until talismans and rituals became a more important aspect.

Some members of the school during the time of its apocalypticism believed those who would be saved would only be elite Daoists who previously used cultivation techniques or studied them in attempts to become xian. Members of the school in the afterlife were thought to be able to aid their living counterparts.

== Pantheon ==
The main god of the Shangqing School is known as the Venerable Sovereign, the first of the Three Pure Ones. The pantheon included gods that could be turned to for help, ones that could be revered and others that could be commanded. As described by Tao Hongjing, the pantheon occupied twenty-eight pages in Shangqing texts, but the most important deities are scarcely mentioned. The canon mostly contains information about the gods that lived within the body.

There are at least eight heavens in Shangqing Daoism, although six of them are evil and demonic. One of them gives its name to the school and has many immortals within it.

== Canon ==
The principal text of the Shangqing School is known as The True Text of the Great Dong (Dadong Zhenjing, 大洞真經). Dong can be translated as cave or grotto, leading to the title being translated as the Great Cavern Scripture, but also has other meanings such as ‘to communicate.’ When the texts were dictated to Yang Xi, the immortals told him that they were the condensed form of primordial qi, and existed before the world was born. Eventually the texts congealed and were sent by heaven to be dictated to Yang.

Some Buddhist elements such as reincarnation and Chinese Buddhism's views on destiny and predestined scenarios were written into Shangqing texts.

Although several sources confirm that the Dadong Zhenjing dates back to the 4th century CE, and earlier fragments exist, the oldest extant complete text, known as the Perfected Scripture of the Great Cavern of Highest Clarity (Shangqing dadong zhenjing 上清大洞真經), was edited by the twenty-third patriarch, Zhu Ziying, and collated in the 13th century by the thirty-eighth patriarch, Jiang Zongying (d. 1281). Later versions introduced “dramatic changes.”

Recitation and veneration of the texts was extremely important. The transmission of texts was strictly controlled, and only a master could give a text to a disciple. The texts could never be revealed to those outside the school.

== List of Shangqing patriarchs ==
1. Wei Huacun (魏華存, 251–334)
2. Yang Xi (楊羲, 330–86)
3. Xu Mi (許謐, 303–76)
4. Xu Hui (許翽, 341–ca. 370)
5. Ma Lang (馬朗)
6. Ma Han (馬罕)
7. Lu Xiujing (陸修靜, 406–77)
8. Sun Youyue (孫游嶽, 399–489)
9. Tao Hongijng (陶弘景, 456–536)
10. Wang Yuanzhi (王遠知, 528–635)
11. Pan Shizheng (潘師正, 585–682)
12. Sima Chengzhen (司馬承禎, 647–735)
13. Li Hanguang (李含光, 683–769)
14. Wei Jingzhao (韋景昭, 694–785)
15. Huang Dongyuan (黃洞元, 698–792)
16. Sun Zhiqing (孫智清)
17. Wu Fatong (吳法通, 825–907)
18. Liu Dechang (劉得常)
19. Wang Qixia (王棲霞, 882–943)
20. Cheng Yanzhao (成延昭, 912–90)
21. Jiang Yuanji (蔣元吉, ?–998)
22. Wan Baochong (萬保沖)
23. Zhu Ziying (朱自英, 976–1029)
24. Mao Fengrou (毛奉柔)
25. Liu Hunkang (劉混康, 1035–1108)
26. Da Jingzhi (笪淨之, 1068–1113)
27. Xu Xihe (徐希和, ?–1127)
28. Jiang Jingche (蔣景徹, ?–1146)
29. Li Jinghe (李景合, ?–1150)
30. Li Jingying (李景暎, ?–1164)
31. Xu Shoujing (徐守經, ?–1195)
32. Qin Ruda (秦汝達, ?–1195)
33. Xing Rujia (邢汝嘉, ?–1209)
34. Xue Ruji (薛汝積, ?–1214)
35. Ren Yuanfu (任元阜, 1176–1239)
36. Bao Zhizhen (鮑志真, ?–1251)
37. Tang Zhidao (湯志道, ?–1258)
38. Jiang Zongying (蔣宗瑛, ?–1281)
39. Jing Yuanfan (景元範)
40. Liu Zongchang (劉宗昶)
41. Wang Zhixin (王志心, ?–1273)
42. Zhai Zhiying (翟志穎, ?–1276)
43. Xu Daoqi (許道杞, 1236–1291)
44. Wang Daomeng (王道孟, 1242–1314)
45. Liu Dabin (劉大彬, fl. 1317–28)
