= List of Lingbao texts =

The following list is a list of the works contained in the Lingbao Canon as listed by Lu Xiujing in his catalogue of the Lingbao School, China, in 437 CE.

Number	Index (Note: The numbers here refer to the text number as catalogued in Schipper's Concordance du Tao-tsang.)	English title	Pinyin title
1	22	Perfected Script in Five Tablets	Wupian zhenwen
2	352	Jade Instructions; Scripture of the Revolution of Great Kalpas; Scripture of the Revolution of Lesser Kalpas	Yujue; Yundu daqie jing; Yundu xiaoqie jing
3		Numinous Stanzas of the Void Caverns	Kongdong lingzhang
4	1439	Stanzas on Ascending to Mystery and Pacing the Void	Shengxuan buxu zhang
5	318	Stanzas of the Life-giving Spirits of the Nine Heavens	Jiutian shengshen zhangjing
6	671	Text of the Self-generating Five Talismans of Correspondence	Ziran wucheng wen
7	97	Inner Sounds and Jade Graphs of the Heavens	Zhutian neiyin yuzi
8	457	Great Precepts of the Upper Chapters on the Roots of Sin	Zuigen shangpin dajie
9	177	Great Precepts of Wisdom from the Upper Chapters	Zhihui shangpin dajie
10 (lost)		Bamboo Slips on the Golden Registers of the Higher Prime	Shangyuan jinlu jianwen
11	1411	Code of the Luminous Perfected	Mingzhen ke
12	177	Scripture on Wisdom and Fixing the Will	Zhihui dingzhi jing
13		Upper Chapters on the Basic Endeavor	Benye shangpin
14	346	Blame and Blessings of the Wheel of the Law	Falun zuifu
15	1	Scripture of Upper Chapters on Limitless Salvation	Wuliang duren shangpin
16	23	Salvation as Recorded by the Spirits of the Various Heavens	Zhutian lingshu duming
17	369	Scripture on Salvation through Extinction and the Fivefold Refinement	Miedu wulian jing
18	456	Precepts of the Chapters of the Three Primes	Sanyuan pinjie
19	1407	Charts of the Twenty-four Life-givers	Ershisi shengtu
20	388	Preface to the Five Talismans of Lingbao (Note: Contained in this text is the Wufujing, the most important Lingbao scripture.)	Lingbao wufu xu
21	425	Concealed Commentary and Treasured Instructions of the Supreme Ultimate	Taiji yinzhu baojue
22	330	Essential Explanations of the Perfected Script	Zhenwen yaojue
23		Explanations of the Self-generating Scripture of Perfect Unity	Zhenyi ziran jingjue
24	532	Instructions on Retreats and the Dignified Liturgies	Fuzhai weiyi jue
25	344	Upper Chapters on the Original Vows and Great Precepts of Devil-destroying Wisdom	Xiaomo zhihui benyuan dajie shangpin
26	1114	The Questions of the Transcendent Duke	Xiangong qingwen
27	1115	Trials of the Sages	Zhusheng nan
28 (lost)		Esoteric Tradition of the Activities of the Divine Transcendents	Shenxian zhenqi neizhuan
29 (lost)		Activities of the Transcendent Duke	Xiangong qiju jing
