= Lu Xiujing =

Taoist compiler and ritualist (406–477)

- 陸修靜
- Born: 406 CE; Wuxing in modern Zhejiang
- Died: 477 CE; Jiankang in modern Jiangsu
- Citizenship: Chinese
- Occupation: Taoist precursor
- Era: Liu Song dynasty
- Movement: Southern Celestial masters

Lu Xiujing (Chinese: 陸修靜; pinyin: Lù Xiūjìng; 406–477), known by the courtesy name Yuande (元德) and the posthumous name Jianji (簡寂), was a Taoist compiler and ritualist who lived under the Liu Song dynasty. His education was of Confucianist leaning. Nevertheless, he chose to study Taoism. Lu was devoted to his faith to the point of abandoning his family.

During his pilgrimages to the various mountains where eminent Taoists had lived, Lu had the chance to collect the scriptures of various currents. His most important accomplishments are his edition of the Lingbao texts and his compilation of the first Taoist Canon. His structuring of the canon, known as the "Three Caverns", has been used from the Tang dynasty onwards.

When he was working on the Lingbao compendium, Lu helped structure and expand the already complex set of rituals. Although Lu attributed a lot of importance to the rituals, he put them in second position in the Taoist Canon, that is in the second cavern.

Lu was eloquent and hard-working, and he played a key role in the promotion of the Lingbao school of thoughts, and of the Taoist school of thoughts at large. He was very highly regarded in his lifetime but, after his death, his attempt at unifying the Taoist practices into one canon encountered a lot of criticism. Eventually his reputation was restored under the Tang.

== Biography ==
The approximate boundaries of the Liu Song around 450, before the end of Wendi's reign.

Lu Xiujing was born in 406 in Wuxing, a district of the historical Dongqian 東遷, modern Zhejiang province. He came from a family of literati and received a strong education in the Confucian classics. Nevertheless, he showed a clear preference for Taoism and the life of a wandering hermit, for which he renounced his family. The earliest biography of Lu Xiujing includes a passage where Lu is said to have declined to heal his gravely ill daughter, despite his family's laments and supplications. He was only passing by, and the story goes that his daughter had miraculously recovered the day after he departed. Whether based on a true event or not, this story illustrates the detachment of Lu Xiujing from earthly concerns and the seriousness of his spiritual quest.

He was first a hermit on Mount Yunmeng in Henan province. Traveling from mountain to mountain, he became increasingly well-known. Eventually, he settled in the Capital Jiankang and opened a trade in medicinal plants. Emperor Wendi, who had heard of Lu's growing influence, had him called to the palace, where he made an impression on the Dowager Empress Wang. She was already a follower of the Huang–Lao, a school of thought with both Legalist and Taoist affinities, and she became a student of Lu Xiujing.

In 453, Wendi's death gave way to a period of political instability which forced Lu to flee south. He arrived at Mount Lu where tradition holds that he met Huiyuan and Tao Yuanming, although their differing dates of birth make such a meeting an impossibility. Mount Lu at the time was an active Buddhist center, which explains why Lu's work often draws from Buddhism. At Mount Lu, Lu built an abbey and trained disciples. Summoned by the court, he eventually returned to the capital Jiankang in 467, where he participated in many brilliant debates with Buddhist masters. In his honr, the Emperor Mingdi built the Temple for the Veneration of the Void (Chongxuguan 崇虛館), the construction of which required considerable effort and the participation of many eminent Daoists. It is while living in this temple that Lu Xiujing compiled the first Taoist Canon.

In 471, Lu conducted a three-weeks retreat for emperor Mingdi who was sick. The emperor died the next year. Lu Xiujing died in the capital in 477 at the age of 71, and was buried at Mount Lu. Among his disciples, Sun Youyue 三会日 in turn became a teacher of the prominent Taoist scholar Tao Hongjing.

== The Lingbao school ==
=== Lingbao scriptures ===
The Lingbao School, or "School of Luminous Treasures" Lingbaopai 灵宝派, started around 400 CE, at the end of the Jin dynasty. Together with the Shangqing school and several other schools, it claimed affinity to The Celestial Masters, a predecessor movement also called Way of the Five Pecks of Rice. The first Lingbao canon was composed of fifty-five scriptures. They were gathered by Ge Chaofu, nephew of the philosopher Ge Hong, in the Book of Lingbao (Lingbaojing 灵宝经). In 437, Lu Xiujing annotated and structured the book to produce the catalog of Lingbao Scriptures (Lingbaojingmu 灵宝经目). He kept only thirty-five of the fifty-five scriptures, three of which are now lost. Several modern scholars suspect Lu of having written part of the scriptures himself.

=== Codification of rituals ===
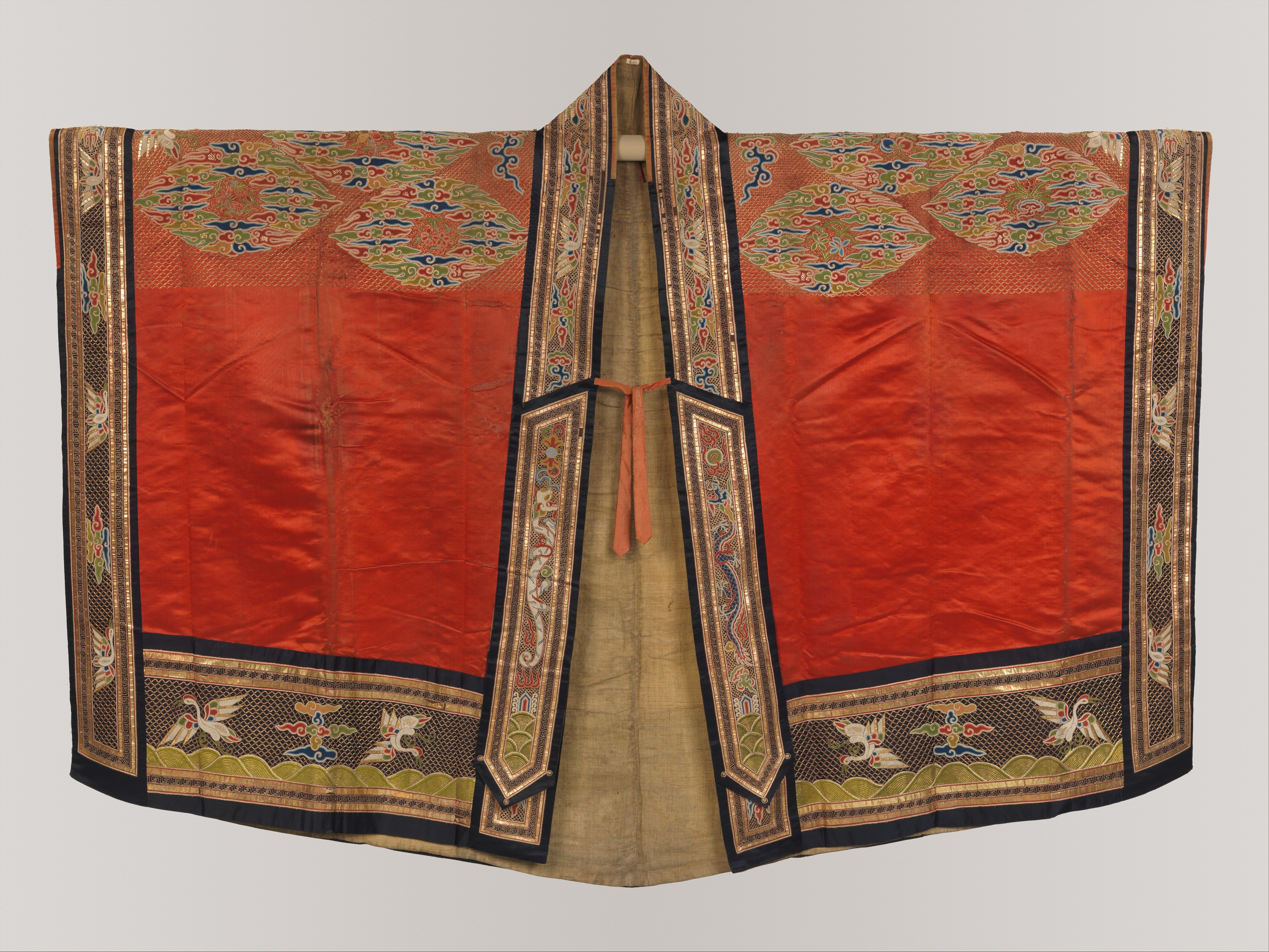
Daoist priest robe

Rituals are the core Lu's practice of Taoism. He considered humans to be fundamentally sinful, thus he put a great emphasis on purification rituals. The Lingbao school's complex web of rituals consisted of three parts: bodily purification (through fasting, bathing and sexual abstinence), mental purification (through confession of sins and meditations) and a prayer ritual (usually involving the sharing of food). Lu Xiujing and other Celestial masters sharpened the code of rituals. Lu especially worked on liturgical programs (collective rituals attended to by the larger community). Among them, the most important one, at least in Lu's eyes, was zhai 齋 which means "fasting" (this ceremony is preceded by a collective fast). The version of the zhai ritual that is performed today is very similar to Lu's. He specified its details in numerous works describing "the nine observations and twelve rules" of the ceremonies (jiu zhai shi'er fa 九齋十二法). Lu's practice was inspired by other religious currents. He modeled part of his practice of Taoism after Confucian rites, and adopted the three main requirements inherent in the Buddhist Noble Eightfold Path: right thought, right speech and right action.

The rituals included music, songs and dances; there was an external aspect that could be perceived by the public, and an internal aspect which consisted of the mental reproduction of the gestures by the Taoist master as they were executed. Lu set the codes for the ritual music performed by the high priest gaogong and the chief cantor dujiang. He is also credited with the first Taoist clerical costume. When it comes to the oratory, the place of worship, Lu lamented the heavy ornamentation typical of “profane practices”, preaching for an unadorned oratory. On the other hand, he criticized the lack of separation between the oratories set by peasants and their daily activities.

=== School reforms ===
Lu wanted to bring the discipline and structure of the Way of the Five Pecks of Rice back to the Lingbao movement. He reinstated the three days of reunion (sanhuiri 三会日), during which the followers had to go to their libation masters to take stock of their past actions and review the rules. They could then benefit from divine protection against diseases and calamities. He reformed the school to make it more dynamic and meritocratic. In effect, the practitioners were ranked: novices were called "servants of the spirits", "spirit officials" were responsible for healing rituals and at the top of the hierarchy, the "libation masters" supervised the novices. But with time, the transmission of these functions became rather hereditary. Lu was one of the reformers who tried to establish a hierarchy in which promotion was based on merits.

== The Three Caverns ==
Once settled in the Temple for the Veneration of the Void in 467, Lu was under the aegis of the emperor. He had in his possession the Shangqing texts that were kept in the imperial library as well as a number of other catalogs. He compiled the first comprehensive Taoist Canon, which he named "the Three Caverns" (Sandong jingshu mulu 三洞经书目录) in imitation of the Tripitaka, Three baskets of the Buddhist Canon. The Three Caverns contained a total of 1318 texts, talismans and pharmaceutical recipes. 138 of them were handed down to Lu from the heavenly palace. In other words, they were composed by him. His classification of the scriptures into three caverns, four auxiliaries and twelve categories (Sandong sifu shi'erlei 三洞四輔十二類), will be taken up by the Daozang (the later Taoist canons) from the Tang dynasty on. Lu presented the result of his work to Mingdi in 471.

The content of the three caverns was originally clearly defined, as well as their hierarchy. The first cavern contained the Shangqing texts which focused on meditation, and constituted, according to Lu, the ultimate level of Taoist masters' training. The second cavern, of intermediate level, contained the Lingbao texts devoted essentially to rituals. The third consisted of the Sanhuang texts, or "Texts of Three Sovereigns". These texts were addressed exorcism, alchemy, and talismans, and were reserved to the first stage of training.

== Posterity ==
=== Critics and eulogies ===
Criticism of Lu's works began soon after his death. Not only Buddhists, but also Daoist polemicists accused him of plagiarism. Among his detractors was philosopher Tao Hongjing, the founder of the Shangqing school of thoughts. On top of that, he was criticized for incorporating earlier non-Daoist works into his catalog. There were also false accusations, for instance allegations were made that were logistically impossible. It took two centuries for Lu to get back in the Daoist community's favor (under the Tang), and several more to get back in the Buddhist scholars' good graces (under the Song). In the 12th century, Song emperor Huizong honored him with the title of danyuan zhenren 丹元真人, meaning "true being", a title reserved to deified Daoists

=== Three laughs at Tiger Brook ===
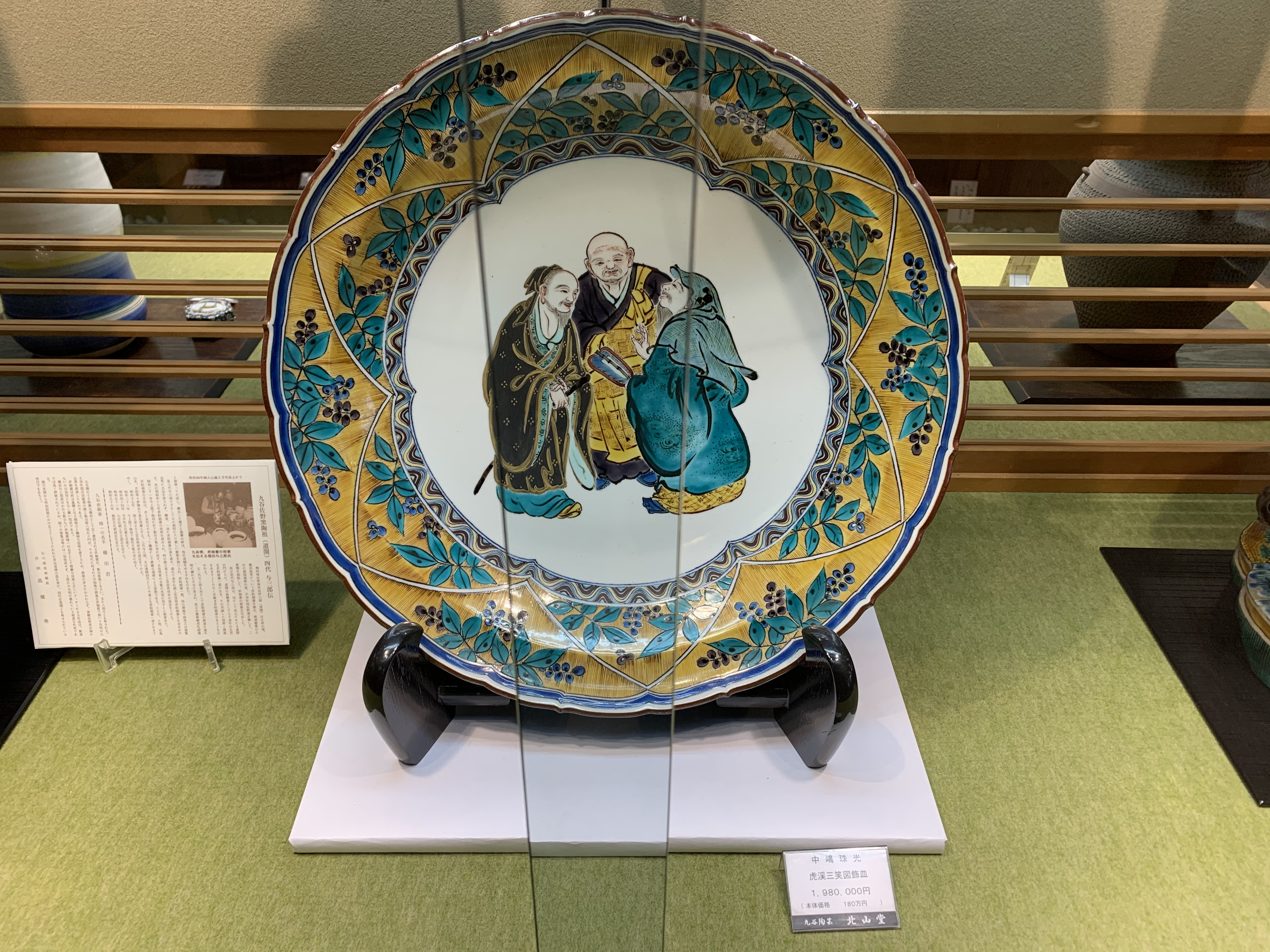
Three laughs at Tiger Brook (ceramic)

A legend born under the Song to promote the syncretism of the three main currents of thought, Confucianism, Daoism and Buddhism brought together on Mount Lu the Buddhist monk Huiyuan (334-416), who had established his residence there, the poet Tao Yuanming (365-427), and Lu Xiujing who visited frequently. Their dates of life show that it is clearly a fiction, which nevertheless inspired the painters. This is the legend known as the Three laughs at Tiger Brook.

It says that Huiyuan, who had not descended from Mount Lu for thirty years, decided to make an exception to accompany Lu Xiujing and Tao Yuanming. However, it was agreed that they would avoid passing through Tiger Brook, so named because of the wild beasts that haunted the place. Lost in their discussions, they did not realize that they were taking the forbidden direction and paid no attention to the roars. It was only at the edge of the torrent that they realized their unconsciousness and burst out laughing together.

== Bibliography ==
- Pregadio, Fabrizio (2008). The Encyclopedia of Taoism. London: Routledge.
- Yamada, Toshiaki (2000). “The Lingbao School.” In Livia Kohn's Daoism Handbook, 225–55. Leiden: Brill.
- Robinet, Isabelle (1997). Taoism: Growth of a religion. Stanford University Press.
- Lagerwey, John, and Pengzhi Lü, eds. (2010). Early Chinese Religion, Part Two: The Period of Division (220-589 AD) (2 vols.). Leiden, The Netherlands: Brill.
- Ren Jiyu (1990). Chinese History of Taoism, 143–168. Shanghai People's Publishing House.
- Li Yangzheng (1989). Introduction to Taoism, 91–95. Zhonghua Book Company.
- Kaltenmark, Max (1960). "Ling-pao: Note sur un terme du taoïsme religieux". Mélanges publiées par l'Institut des Hautes Études Chinoises, 2: 559–588.
- Bokenkamp, Stephen R. (2011). "The Early Lingbao Scriptures and the Origins of Daoist Monasticism". Cahiers D'Extrême-Asie, 20: 95–124. École française d’Extrême-Orient.
- Pimpaneau, Jacques (1989). Chine: Histoire de la littérature. Arles: Philippe Picquier, re-edited in 2004.
- Yeh Chia-ying, translation Josey Shun and Bhikshuni Heng Yin (1998). "Lectures on Tao Yuanming's Poems", a series of lectures at Gold Buddha Monastery, Canada (lecture tapes were transcribed by Tu Xiaoli, An Yi, and Yang Aidi): "Vajra Bhodi Sea" No.338.
