= Wei Huacun =

Founder of the Shangqing School of Taoism

- Traditional Chinese: 魏華存
- Simplified Chinese: 魏华存
Transcriptions
Standard Mandarin
- Hanyu Pinyin: Wèi Huācún
- Wade–Giles: Wei Huats'un

Wei Huacun (252–334), courtesy name Xianan (賢安), was the founder of the Shangqing sect of Daoism.

== Overview ==
Wei was born in 252 in Jining, Shandong in the former county of Rencheng (任城). Her father, Wei Shu (魏舒), was a government official. From an early age she displayed a propensity for studying the works of Laozi and Zhuangzi, and practising Daoist methods of cultivation.

At the age of 24, she was married to Liu Wen (劉文) against her will by her parents and had two sons. After they grew up, she resumed her Daoist practices. At some point she became a libationer in the priesthood of the Celestial Masters sect of Daoism.

According to her Shangqing hagiographers, her devotion to Daoist cultivation so impressed a number of immortals that she received revelations from them: 31 volumes of Daoist scripture which would become the foundation of Shangqing Daoism. Among these was the Yellow Court Classic (黃庭經), which detailed a form of Daoist meditation involving the visualizations of deities within the adept's body, a practice that would become a defining feature of Shangqing. There is also a story about the immortal Wang Bo visiting Wei and bestowing the Great Cavern Scripture to her while teaching her that above the state of Jade Purity is the High Pure Realm (Shang Qing), which became the name of her school of practise after she began teaching.

Shangqing has sometimes been described as a "mystical" form of Daoism, emphasising the notion of the human body as a microcosm containing universal energies, which could be actualised by ecstatic union with deities. With the emphasis on meditation, there would be much less attention paid to physiological cultivation by ingesting herbs and drugs, which had been important in earlier forms of Daoism.

When Wei's disciple Yang Xi (楊羲) formally founded the Shangqing school, 30 years after her death, Wei was acknowledged as the first Patriarch of Shangqing Daoism and, as an immortal, would be a source of continuing revelations. The sect was based on Mao Mountain (茅山), situated to the south of Nanjing, and thus became known as the Maoshan sect. From the 6th to the 10th century, Shangqing was the most prominent Daoist sect and gained favour among aristocrats of the Tang dynasty. The Shangqing scriptures were regarded as possessing a high literary quality that previous Daoist scriptures did not, and their vivid esoteric imagery was an inspiration to artists and poets.
