= Daozang =

Taoist canonical collection

The Daozang (Chinese: 道藏; pinyin: Dàozàng; Wade–Giles: Tao Tsang) is a large canon of Taoist writings, consisting of around 1,500 texts that were seen as continuing traditions first embodied by the Daodejing, Zhuangzi, and Liezi. The canon was assembled by monks c. 400 CE in an attempt to bring together these disparate yet consonant teachings, and it included commentaries and expositions from various masters on material found in the aforementioned core texts of Taoism. The anthology consisted of three divisions (known as grottoes 三洞) based on what were seen at that time in Southern China as Taoism's primary focuses: meditation, ritual, and exorcism. These three grottoes rather than seeing them as a doctrine of immanent ascendance or a kind of hierarchical staking that is ranked by skill level, it is better to understand them as a kind of scaffolding that the lower section is as important as the highest as seen within the body of the text with exorcism being the lowest Grotto and meditation the highest Grotto — both being used by for the Taoist masters and Monastics.

In addition to the Three Grottoes, there were the "Four Supplements" (四辅) that were added to the canon c. 500 CE. Three were primarily sourced from the older core texts, with the other taken from a separate, established philosophical tradition known as Tianshi Dao.

Unlike many spiritual and religious canons, the Daozang is not considered to be highly organized. Although at present the core divisions have been preserved, substantial forks in the ordering and arrangement of the constituent texts have arisen due to the later addition of commentaries, revelations and texts further elaborating upon earlier iterations.

== Timeline ==
1. The First Daozang
  - During the era of Northern and Southern dynasties, this was the first time an effort was made to compile and categorised scriptures and texts from across China by Lu Xiujing and occurred around 471 and consisted of roughly 1,228 scrolls.
2. The Second Daozang
  - In 748, the Tang emperor Tang Xuan-Zong who was a devoted Taoist (the royal family claimed to be the descendants of Laozi) sent clergy to collect more scriptures and texts that expanded the Taoist Canon.
3. The Third Daozang
  - Around 1016 of the Song dynasty, the Daozang was revised and many texts collected during the Tang dynasty were removed. This third Daozang consisted of approximately more than 4500 scrolls and was known as Yunji Qiqian.
4. The Fourth Daozang
  - In 1444 of the Ming dynasty, a final version was produced consisting of approximately 5300 scrolls.

Many new Daozang were published.

== Constituent parts ==
=== Three Grottoes (sandong) 三洞 400 ===
What is important to understand about the order of these texts is that it is based on an ancient philosophy used within the theory of Traditional Chinese Medicine and indigenous Chinese folk religion called Sanjao (三膲) for the former and Sanbao (三寶) for the latter. Using this theory the first Grotto is associated with the upper centre or jao that corresponds to Shen, mind or Spirit therefore hollow or open, where as the second Grotto is associated the middle jao and is considered the level of Qi digestion, function and concentration as in this case the effective performance of rituals, rights and magic incarnations, and lastly the third or lower jao is assigned to Jing know as essence in the west, this jao is more formative or structural when compared to the upper jao. As this theory is contextual and the lower Grotto becomes solid or full in relationship with the upper Grotto, therefore more about the medicine, and protection from pathogens and weather and the expulsion of evil enactors or doings with elixirs and potions.

1. Authenticity Grotto (Dongzhen) 洞真部: Texts of Supreme Purity (Shangqing) tradition
  - This grotto is concerned mainly with meditation and is the highest phase of initiation for a Taoist master.
2. Mystery Grotto (Dongxuan) 洞玄部: Texts of Sacred Treasure (Lingbao) tradition
  - This grotto is concerned mainly with rituals and is the middle phase of initiation for a Taoist master.
3. Spirit Grotto (Dongshen) 洞神部: Texts of Three Sovereigns (Sanhuang) tradition
  - This grotto is concerned mainly with exorcisms and is the lowest phase of initiation for a Taoist master.

==== Each of the Three Grottoes contains the following 12 chapters ====
1. Main texts (Benwen) 本文類
2. Talismans (Shenfu) 神符類
3. Commentaries (Yujue) 玉訣類
4. Diagrams and illustrations (Lingtu) 靈圖類
5. Histories and genealogies (Pulu) 譜錄類
6. Precepts (Jielu) 戒律類
7. Ceremonies (Weiyi) 威儀類
8. Rituals (Fangfa) 方法類
9. Practices (Zhongshu) 像術(衆術)類
10. Biographies (Jizhuan) 記傳類
11. Hymns (Zansong) 讚頌類
12. Memorials (Biaozou) 表奏類

=== Four Supplements 500 ===
1. Great Mystery (Taixuan) 太玄部: Based on the Dao De Jing
2. Great Peace (Taiping) 太平部: Based on the Taiping Jing
3. Great Purity (Taiqing) 太清部: Based on the Taiqing Jing and other alchemical texts
4. Orthodox One (Zhengyi) 正一(正乙)部: Based on the Way of the Celestial Masters (Tianshi Dao) tradition.

== See also ==
- Ruzang
