= Zhenren =

Chinese Daoist term for an ideal sage

Zhenren (Chinese: 真人; pinyin: zhēnrén; Wade–Giles: chen-jen; lit. 'true/ upright/ genuine person' or 'person of truth') is a Chinese term that first appeared in the Zhuangzi meaning "a Taoist spiritual master" in those writings, as in one who has mastered realization of the Tao. Religious Taoism mythologized zhenren, having them occupy various places in the celestial hierarchy sometimes synonymous with xian. Zhenren has been used in various ways depending on the sect and time period.

== Linguistics of Zhen 真 ==
The common Chinese word 真; zhen; "true; real; authentic, upright" is linguistically unusual. It was originally written with an ideogram (one of the rarest types in Chinese character classification) depicting "spiritual transformation". It originated in the Taoist Tao Te Ching that has similar characteristics to the Ancient Chinese term Jūnzǐ (君子) that appears in the early Confucian classics.

=== Characters ===
The archaic Chinese character 眞 was reduced into 真, which is the Traditional Chinese character, Simplified Chinese character, and Japanese Kanji. (Note the slight font variation between Chinese 真 and Japanese 真: when enlarged, the Japanese character reveals separation between the central and lower parts.) This modern character 真 appears to derive from 兀; wu; "stool" under 直; zhi; "straight", but the ancient 眞 has 匕; hua (a reduced variant of 化) "upside-down person; transformation" at the top, rather than 十; shi; "10". This antiquated zhen 眞 derives from seal script characters (4th–3rd centuries BCE). It is tentatively identified in the earlier bronzeware script (with 匕 over ding (鼎; "cooking vessel; tripod; cauldron") and unidentified in the earliest oracle bone script.

Xu Shen's Shuowen Jiezi (122 CE), the first Chinese dictionary of characters, gives small seal script and "ancient text" forms of zhen 眞, noting origins in Taoism. It defines 眞 as "A xian (Taoist "transcendent; immortal") transforming shape and ascending into Heaven" (僊人變形而登天也), and interprets 眞 as an ideogram with 匕 "upside-down person", 目 "eye", and ∟ "conceal" representing the xian plus 八 representing the conveyance. In Coyle's interpretation,

The etymological components suggest transforming to a higher level of character, thus genuineness is to be conceived as fundamentally transformational, that is, as an ongoing process of change. As Wang Bi's (226–249 C.E.) commentary to the Yijing suggests, zhen is in "constant mutation." By envisioning a new image, it appears, with zhen, the writers of the Laozi and Zhuangzi wanted to distinguish their teaching from others.

Duan Yucai's Shuowen commentary (1815 CE) confirms that zhen originally depicted a Taoist zhenren and was semantically extended to mean cheng 誠 "sincere; honest; true; actual; real". It explains the ideographic components in Taoist xian terms, 匕 for hua 化 "change; transformation" (see the Huashu), 目 for the "eyes; vision" in neidan practices, ∟ "conceal" for invisibility; and, it notes three traditional xian conveyances into the heavens (qi, Chinese dragon, and qilin).

Duan differentiates two semantic sets of words written with the zhen 真/眞 phonetic element and different radicals. The first words basically mean chongshi 充實 "real; solid; substantial; substantiate; fill out; strengthen".

- tian 塡/填 "fill in; fill up; stuff; block" (土 "soil" radical)
- tian 鎭 "weigh down; press upon; control" (金 "metal")
- tian 闐 "full; abundant; rumbling sound" (門 "gate; door")
- zhen 瑱 "earplug; earring" (玉 "jade")
- zhen 縝 "fine; close woven; careful" (糸 "silk")
- cao or shen 愼 "careful; cautious; circumspect" (心 "heart")

The second set of words basically mean ding 頂 "crown (of head); top; tip; summit; prop up; fall down".

- dian 顚/顛 "top of the head; fall on the head; totter; tumble" (頁 "head" radical)
- dian 巓/巔"mountain peak; summit; fall down" (山 "mountain")
- dian 傎 "topple; overthrow; fall" (人 "person")
- dian 蹎 "stumble; trip; fall" (足 "foot")
- dian 癲/厧 "crazy; demented; epileptic" (疒 "sickness")
- zhen 槇 "tip of a tree; fallen tree" (木 "tree")

=== Etymology ===
The modern Standard Chinese pronunciation of 真 is zhēn. Reconstructed Middle Chinese and Old Chinese pronunciations include tyĕn < *tśyĕn (Bernhard Karlgren), tśiɪn < *tjien (Zhou Fagao), tʃiĕn < *tien (Tōdō Akiyasu), or tśin < *tin.

Tōdō envisions that the original "upside-down zhenren" ideograph pictured a sacrificial victim zhen 眞 "falling into; fitting into" a burial pit being tian 塡 "filled in", and proposes an etymon of *TEN "full; stuffed" (expanding upon Duan Yucai's examples above).

Schuessler's etymological dictionary cites Ming- and Yuan dynasty-era transcriptions of [tʂin]. It suggests etymological connections with Tibetan bden pa "true" (see two truths doctrine) and possibly Chinese zhēn 貞 "divination, divine; test; verify; faithful; loyal".

=== Semantics ===
The root word of zhenren is 真; zhen; "true; real; factual; genuine; authentic; actual; really; truly; indeed", which has a special Daoist meaning of a person's "true, original, undamaged character".

The Hanyu Da Zidian, which lists meanings in order of historical development, defines 15 for zhen:

1. 道家称"修真得道"或"成仙"的人。 [Taoist term for a person who has "cultivated perfection and attained the Tao" or "become a xian".]
2. 精；淳。[Jing; essence; spirit; perfection; purity; simplicity.]
3. 本来的，固有的。 [Original; real; intrinsic, innate, inherent.]
4. 本原；本性。 [Principle; natural property; natural instincts; natural character; inherent quality; inborn nature.]
5. 真实。 [Real; genuine; true; authentic.]
6. 真诚，诚实。 [Sincere; real; honest; true.]
7. 正。 [Correct; right, straight.]
8. 身。 [Body; person; life.]
9. 肖像。摹画的人像。 [Portrait; portraiture; image.]
10. 古代指实授官职为真。 [Ancient term for a permanent (i.e., not temporary) government position.]
11. 汉字楷书的别称。 [Term for regular script in Chinese calligraphy.]
12. 真切；清楚。 [Vivid; clear; distinct; sure; unambiguous.]
13. 古州名。 [Name of Zhen prefecture (Tang dynasty).]
14. 通"填(tián)"。 [Used for tián "fill in; stuff".]
15. 姓。 [A surname.]

According to this historical dictionary of Chinese characters, the first occurrences of zhen are in Taoist classics. The Tao Te Ching uses it in meaning 2 and the Zhuangzi uses zhen in meanings 1, 3, 4, 5, 6, and 8.

Zhen 真 "true; real" originally occurs three times in the Tao Te Ching (ca. 4th–3rd centuries BCE?), where Coyle says,

[I]t is employed as a special term to contrast with the transitoriness and superficiality of "man-made" formalities. In this novel approach, "genuineness" is not understood as any sort of "unchanging reality," but rather has to do with change and "cultivation." The first time we encounter zhen in the Inner Chapters [see Zhuangzi 2 below] is in the context of the flux and interrelatedness of life and death, where "genuineness" is something ever-present, yet without any apprehensible fixed "identity".

One of these three zhen usages describes Tao "Way" and the other two describe De "integrity; virtue".

How cavernous and dark! Yet within it there is an essence. Its essence is quite real; Within it there are tokens. (21)

The greatest whiteness seems grimy. Ample integrity seems insufficient. Robust integrity seems apathetic. Plain truth seems sullied. (41)

Cultivated in the person, integrity is true. Cultivated in the family, integrity is ample. Cultivated in the village, integrity lasts long. ... (54)

== Daoist usages of zhenren 真人 ==
While the Dao De Jing has the first occurrences of zhen "true; real; etc.", the Zhuangzi has the first recorded usages of zhenren "true person". Later zhenren meanings are found in Buddhist and other texts.

=== Zhuangzi ===
The Zhuangzi (ca. 3rd–2nd centuries BCE) has 66 occurrences of zhen, 19 of them in the compound zhenren. Burton Watson translates it as "True Man", and notes "Another term for the Taoist sage, synonymous with the Perfect Man or the Holy Man." The most descriptive zhenren passage repeats it 9 times.

There must first be a True Man before there can be true knowledge. What do I mean by a True Man? The True Man of ancient times did not rebel against want, did not grow proud in plenty, and did not plan his affairs. A man like this could commit an error and not regret it, could meet with success and not make a show. A man like this could climb the high places and not be frightened, could enter the water and not get wet, could enter the fire and not get burned. His knowledge was able to climb all the way up to the Way like this.

The True Man of ancient times slept without dreaming and woke without care; he ate without savoring and his breath came from deep inside. The True Man breathes with his heels; the mass of men breathe with their throats. Crushed and bound down, they gasp out their words as though they were retching. Deep in their passions and desires, they are shallow in the workings of Heaven.

The True Man of ancient times knew nothing of loving life, knew nothing of hating death. He emerged without delight; he went back in without a fuss. He came briskly, he went briskly, and that was all. He didn't forget where he began; he didn't try to find out where he would end. He received something and took pleasure in it; he forgot about it and handed it back again. This is what I call not using the mind to repel the Way, not using man to help out Heaven. This is what I call the True Man. ...

This was the True Man of old: his bearing was lofty and did not crumble; he appeared to lack but accepted nothing; he was dignified in his correctness but not insistent; he was vast in his emptiness but not ostentatious. Mild and cheerful, he seemed to be happy; reluctant, he could not help doing certain things; annoyed, he let it show in his face; relaxed, he rested in his virtue. Tolerant, he seemed to be part of the world; towering alone, he could be checked by nothing; withdrawn, he seemed to prefer to cut himself off; bemused, he forgot what he was going to say. ...

Therefore his liking was one and his not liking was one. His being one was one and his not being one was one. In being one, he was acting as a companion of Heaven. In not being one, he was acting as a companion of man. When man and Heaven do not defeat each other, then we may be said to have the True Man. (6, 大宗師)

Guo Xiang (d. 312 CE), the earliest known Zhuangzi editor and commentator, explains this passage.

The zhenren unifies Heaven and man, and levels the myriad extensions. The myriad extensions do not oppose each other, and Heaven and man do not overcome each other. Thus being vast he is one, being dark he is omnipresent – he mysteriously unifies the other with his own self.

Watson's "True Man of ancient times" and "True Man of old" translate gu zhi zhenren (古之真人), which the Zhuangzi uses 7 times. For instance, this contrast with the 神人; shenren; "holy person"

Therefore the Holy Man hates to see the crowd arriving, and if it does arrive, he does not try to be friendly with it; not being friendly with it, he naturally does nothing to benefit it. So he makes sure that there is nothing he is very close to, and nothing he is very distant with. Embracing virtue, infused with harmony, he follows along with the world – this is what is called the True Man. He leaves wisdom to the ants, takes his cue from the fishes, leaves willfulness to the mutton. Use the eye to look at the eye, the ear to listen to the ear, and the mind to restore the mind. Do this and your levelness will be as though measured with the line, your transformations will be a form of compliance. The True Man of ancient times used Heaven to deal with man; he did not use man to work his way into Heaven. The True Man of ancient times got it and lived, lost it and died; got it and died, lost it and lived. Medicines will serve as an example. There are monkshood, balloonflower, cockscomb, and chinaroot; each has a time when it is the sovereign remedy, though the individual cases are too numerous to describe. (24)

Another Zhuangzi chapter depicts zhenren as oblivious to punishment.

Governing is a difficult thing. To dispense favors to men without ever forgetting that you are doing so – this is not Heaven's way of giving. Even merchants and peddlers are unwilling to be ranked with such a person; and although their occupations may seem to rank them with him, in their hearts they will never acquiesce to such a ranking. External punishments are administered by implements of metal and wood; internal punishments are inflicted by frenzy and excess. When the petty man meets with external punishments, the implements of metal and wood bear down on him; when he incurs internal punishment, the yin and yang eat him up. To escape both external and internal punishment – only the True Man is capable of this. (32)

=== Huainanzi ===
The Huainanzi (2nd century BCE) mentions zhenren "true person" 11 times. One Huainanzi chapter uses zhenren to describe a spiritual state in which "closing the four senses" results in one's 精; jing; "essence" and 神; shen; "spirit" returning to the ultimate Daoist 真; zhen; "truth".

Hence the spiritual faculties will be hidden in the invisible world, and the spirit will return to the Perfect Body (or the Perfect Realm). ... The spirit fills the eye, so he sees clearly; it is present in the ear, so he hears acutely; it abides in the mouth, and so the person's words are with wisdom; it accumulates in the mind, so his thoughts are penetrative. Hence the closing down of the Four Senses gives the body rest from troubles, and the individual parts have no sickness. There is no death, no life, no void, no excess; in such a condition of spirit, like the diamond, it will not wear away; such are the characteristics of the Perfect Man. (8)

A second chapter uses zhenren to describe Fu Xi and Nüwa.

Drifting aimlessly, they led the ghosts and spirits and ascended the Nine Heavens, where they paid court to the Lord as the Sacred Gate and remained reverently silent in the presence of the Great Ancestor. Even then, they would not extol their own merit, or trumpet their own fame. [Rather], they concealed within themselves the Tao of the True Man and thereby followed the unchanging course of Heaven and Earth. How was this [possible]? With their Tao and Te they communicated with what was on high, whereas their knowledge of factual matters was obliterated. (6)

A third Huainanzi chapter contains what Le Blanc considers "the locus classicus for the True Man's ability to return to the origin."

He who can return to that which produced [him] as if he had not yet acquired [physical] form, we call him a True Man. The True Man is he who has not yet begun to differentiate himself from the Great Unity (wei shih fen yu t'ai-yi che 未始分於太一者). (14)

Le Blanc describes how the Huainanzi synthesizes the "other-worldly" zhenren "True Man" with the "this-worldly" shengren "Sage"; "In pre-Han works, the expression "chen-jen" seems to be found only in works of Taoist inspiration and always refers to the quasi-mystical and contemplative strand of Taoism." He concludes.

The point of the two Huai-nan tzu fables seems to be that in times of peace the True Man does not reveal his inner greatness. This is a Taoist tenet consistent with the ineffability of Tao. So, petty men of limited scope and skills deride the True Man, who is untrained in any particular skill. But in periods of imminent chaos (the clash of darkness and light, of Yin and Yang) the True Man suddenly manifests world-shaking power (universal resonance) and completely overwhelms his detractors.

=== Chuci ===
The southern Chuci (2nd century CE), which has Daoist elements although not strictly a "Daoist text", uses zhenren in two poems. Yuan you "Far-off journey" contrasts it with xian.

I honoured the wondrous powers of the Pure Ones,
And those of past ages who had become Immortals.
They departed in the flux of change and vanished from men's sight,
Leaving a famous name that endures after them.

Shou zhi "Maintaining Resolution" (in the Nine Longings section) also uses it, translated here as "Immortals".

I visited Fu Yue, bestriding a dragon,
Joined up in marriage with the Weaving Maiden,
Lifted up Heaven's Net to capture evil,
Drew the Bow of Heaven to shoot at wickedness,
Followed the Immortals fluttering through the sky.

=== Liezi ===
The Daoist Liezi (ca. 4th century CE) uses zhenren in two chapters. The first usage (3), refers to the Zhuangzi (6) saying zhenren slept without dreaming.

A dream is something that comes into contact with the mind; an external event is something that impinges on the body. Hence our feelings by day and our dreams by night are the result of contacts made by mind or body. It follows that if we can concentrate the maid in abstraction, our feelings and our dreams will vanish of themselves. Those who rely on their waking perceptions will not argue about them. Those who put faith in dreams do not understand the processes of change in the external world. "The pure men of old passed their waking existence in self-oblivion, and slept without dreams." How can this be dismissed as an empty phrase?

The other chapter usage (8) concerns the politician Zi Chan 子產 (d. 522 BCE). He was able to govern the state of Zheng but not control his brothers who loved wine and women – but were secretly zhenren. Zi Chan asks the Daoist sage Deng Xi 鄧析 how to "save" them, but misunderstands Deng's answer and admonishes his brothers with Confucianist morality and bribes, "Hear my words. Repent in the morning, and in the evening you will have already gained the wage that will support you". His brothers reply,

Long ago we knew it and made our choice. Nor had we to wait for your instructions to enlighten us. It is very difficult to preserve life, and easy to come by one's death. Yet who would think of awaiting death, which comes so easily, on account of the difficulty of preserving life? You value proper conduct and righteousness in order to excel before others, and you do violence to your feelings and nature in striving for glory. That to us appears to be worse than death. Our only fear is lest, wishing to gaze our fill at all the beauties of this one life, and to exhaust all the pleasures of the present years, the repletion of the belly should prevent us from drinking what our palate delights in, or the slackening of our strength not allow us to revel with pretty women. We have no time to trouble about bad reputations or mental dangers. Therefore for you to argue with us and disturb our minds merely because you surpass others in ability to govern, and to try and allure us with promises of glory and appointments, is indeed shameful and deplorable. But we will now settle the question with you. See now. If anybody knows how to regulate external things, the things do not of necessity become regulated, and his body has still to toil and labour. But if anybody knows how to regulate internals, the things go on all right, and the mind obtains peace and rest. Your system of regulating external things will do temporarily and for a single kingdom, but it is not in harmony with the human heart, while our method of regulating internals can be extended to the whole universe, and there would be no more princes and ministers. We always desired to propagate this doctrine of ours, and now you would teach us yours.

Zi Chan is perplexed and speechless, so he goes back to Deng Xi who explains, "You are living together with real men without knowing it. Who calls you wise? [Z]heng has been governed by chance, and without merit of yours."

=== Wenzi ===
The little-known Daoist text Wenzi has 17 occurrences of zhenren. For example, this context echoes Zhuangzi (6) in defining zhenren as sleeping without dreaming.

The Way molds myriad beings but is ever formless. Silent and unmoving, it totally comprehends the undifferentiated unknown. No vastness is great enough to be outside it, no minuteness is small enough to be inside it. It has no house but gives birth to all the names of the existent and nonexistent. Real people embody this through open emptiness, even easiness, clear cleanness, flexible yielding, unadulterated purity, and plain simplicity, not getting mixed up in things. Their perfect virtue is the Way of heaven and earth, so they are called real people. Real people know how to deem the self great and the world small, they esteem self-government and disdain governing others. They do not let things disturb their harmony, they do not let desires derange their feelings. Concealing their names, they hide when the Way is in effect and appear when it is not. They act without contrivance, work without striving, and know without intellectualizing. ... Therefore real people deliberately return to essence, relying on the support of spirit, thus attaining completeness. So they sleep without dreams and awake without worries.

=== Later Daoist texts ===
According to Daniel Coyle,

From the period of the Han to the Six Dynasties the zhenren took on a more religious significance, becoming one of the linchpins of "Daoism." Movements of alchemy, life-prolonging techniques, and the quest for "immortality" flourished, yet most mystical allusions remained firmly ground in the Zhuangzi. From the Zhuangzian perspective, the religious experience (etymologically, that which binds together) becomes a personal rapture that elevates one from the microcosmic to an altogether macrocosmic perspective – a perspective that affirms continuity as the fabric of unity – that somehow binds one to the totality of existence in a personal integration and affirmation of all.

Daoists applied the honorific title Zhenren to their sages. Zhou Yishan 周義山 (b. 80 BCE) was called Ziyang Zhenren (紫陽真人; "True Person of Purple Yang"), a name later applied to Zhang Ziyang 張紫陽, author of the Wuzhen pian (note zhen "reality; perfection" in the title).

Miura notes that religious Daoism associated the zhenren with the xianren "transcendent; immortal" and quotes the Ziyang zhenren neizhuan (紫陽真人內傳; "Inner Biography of the True Person of Purple Yang") (4th century CE) that there are upper, middle, and lower degrees of xian, with zhenren occupying the upper rank in the celestial bureaucracy.

In Daoism, zhenren can refer to some gods, xian, and even mortals who underwent apotheosis. The term can also refer to beings who were a mixture of one or more of these.

== Other usages of zhenren 真人 ==
After originating in early Daoist texts, the zhenren "true person" was semantically expanded to mean Buddhist arhat and miscellaneous senses such as "honest person".

=== Buddhist texts ===
Chinese Buddhists adapted 真人; zhenren as an early translation for arahant or arhat, a "worthy one" who has destroyed the afflictions and causes of future rebirth. Buddhist usage contrasts zhenren, "arhat," with niren 逆人, "contrary person; hateful person; unprincipled person". Arhat is also transcribed as 阿羅漢; aluohan or 羅漢; luohan. Buddhist exegetical materials continued to use 真人; zhenren for a Buddhist saint or sage.

The oldest example is the Tang dynasty (c. 649) Buddhist dictionary Yiqiejing yinyi "Pronunciation and Meaning in the Tripitaka", edited by Xuan Ying 玄應.

The term wúwèi zhēnrén (無位真人; "true man with no rank") was coined by the Tang era Chan master, Linji Yixuan, to refer to the Buddha-mind. Wúwèi zhēnrén also refers to the numinous awareness (lingzhi) which passes freely through the sense faculties, and is thus equivalent to buddha-nature. Linji contrasts this "true man with no rank" with the "lump of red flesh," or the physical body, which is afflicted by sensory experience.

Chinese zhen "true; etc." was used to translate various other Buddhist expressions. Mantra is translated into Chinese as zhenyan 真言 "true words" and the Japanese esoteric Shingon school is 真言宗, the "true word school" or "mantra school." Tathata "thusness, suchness, the unconditioned, unchanging reality" is Chinese zhenru 真如 (Japanese, shinnyo) "true resemblance". It also occurs in the name of the Shinnyo En school.

=== Secular texts ===
Chinese authors used zhenren "true person" to name sage-rulers, honest people, a star, an evolutionary term, and proper names.

Zhenren can mean "heaven-sent ruler". Beginning around the end of the 1st century BCE, says Miura, "the idea spread that a zhenren who had received the Heavenly Mandate (tianming 天命) would appear to renew the world." Emperor Guangwu of Han was called 白水真人; Baishui Zhenren; "True Person of the White Water", and Cao Cao of the Kingdom of Wei was also called a zhenren. The Records of the Grand Historian (ca. 100 BCE) may have a classical precedent for this meaning. It records that the "First Emperor" Qin Shi Huang (r. 221–210 BCE) was fascinated with the immortality of the xian and decided to call himself zhenren rather than the homophonous Chinese honorific 朕; zhen; "(imperial) I, we". The emperor summoned the Daoist practitioner Lu Sheng 盧生 who said, "The zhenren enters water but does not get wet, enters fire but does not get burned, flies among the clouds, and has a length of life equal to that of Heaven and Earth". The Taipingjing (太平經; "Scripture of Great Peace") (6th century CE) contrasts the zhenren who rules on earth with a shenren (神人; "divine person") who rules in heaven.

Zhenren can mean "honest person; well-behaved person", nearly synonymous with zhenren (貞人; "person of high moral standing and integrity") and zhengren (正人; "honest/loyal man; gentleman"). The earliest recorded example is the Book of Han (5th century CE) biography of Yang Yun 楊惲 (fl. 1st century BCE). This meaning is expressed in the idiom zhengren mian qian bu shuo jia (真人面前不說假; "don't tell lies in front of a true/honest person").

Among Traditional Chinese star names, Zhenren 真人 is a literary reference to Gamma Ursae Majoris, near the Big Dipper.

In modern Chinese terms of human evolution, zhenren means "true human" as distinct from other primates.

Zhenren is a proper name of characters in Chinese folklore (e.g., Taiyi Zhenren), Chinese mythology (Cihang Zhenren), and Chinese literature (Luo Zhenren). Note that Japanese 真人 can be pronounced shinjin in the Daoist sense and Masato (e.g., Masato Shimon) or Mahito (Mahito Tsujimura) as a given name.

== Zhenren interpretations ==
Generations of Western researchers have struggled with translating and explaining the Daoist technical expression zhenren.

=== Translations ===
Zhuangzi translators and scholars have variously rendered zhenren 真人.

- "Divine Man" — Frederic H. Balfour
- "true man" — James Legge 1891, Fung Yu-lan, Victor H. Mair
- "pure man" — Herbert Giles
- "God's Man" — James R. Ware 1963
- "True Man" — Burton Watson, A.C. Graham 1981
- "Perfected Person" — Lee Yearley
- "Perfect Man" — Toshikiko Izutsu
- "realized beings" — David McCraw 1995
- "Authentic Person" — Roger T. Ames, James D. Sellmann
- "Genuine Person" – Coyle 1998

Note the diachronic improvements of these zhenren translations. In Chinese, ren 人 means "person; people; human" and not "man", which is nan 男 "man; male"

Ames explains his rationale for translating zhenren as "Authentic Person".

The common translations of zhenren – "True Man" or "Real Man" – belies the fact that etymologically zhen implies both "authenticity" and "transformation." That is, whatever the human exemplar might be, he or she is one who is able to express personal integrity and uniqueness in the context of a transforming world. The choice of "authentic" to translate zhen is calculated. With the same root as "author," it captures the primacy given to the creative contribution of the particular person. It further registers this contribution as what is most fundamentally "real" and "true."It is because of the primacy of the "authorship" of the "authentic person" in creating human order that "there must be the Authentic Person before there can be authentic knowledge."

Coyle prefers "genuine" over "authentic",

"Authentic person" works well, conveying the idea of "authorship," but it connotes an idea of "human agency" that Zhuangzi is trying to avoid. "Genuine person" seems to work best as it carries the least amount of "philosophical" baggage. Etymologically, "genuine" comes from the Latin genuinus, "natural," which is akin to gignere, to beget (possibly an alteration of ingenuus, native, or freeborn), and thus connotes a processionality necessary to any Zhuangzian interpretation.

There are semantic advantages to English translations of zhenren as a "Person" who is "Perfected", "Realized", or "Genuine". Another possibility is "Actualized Person" in the psychological sense of self actualization.

=== Descriptions ===
Morgan provides an early description of the zhenren.

[T]he Perfect Man of the Taoist system, always acts in the spirit of wu wei, of apparently doing nothing. He withdraws from the active arena of affairs and retires into seclusion and does not interfere in public agitations and turmoil; but, as we have already seen, their influence is very effective. The silence they observe carries out the Tao of wu wei, which is of priceless value. But merely learned persons do not appreciate this method nor understand the value of the wu wei method: and they engage in purposeless discussions and the vanity of words.

In recent years, scholars of Daoism have been reevaluating the zhenren ideal.

Yearley characterizes the zhenren in terms of skepticism from a "radical Zhuangzi" framework, intraworldly mysticism, centered responsiveness, the "mind as a mirror" image, subtle detachment, and viewing life as an "esthetic panorama."

Izutsu says "[T]he Perfect Man is in every respect a Perfect image of Heaven and Earth, i.e., the Way as it manifests itself as the world of Being". He analyzes the zhenren in terms of "unperturbedness", flexibility, and wu wei.

Such being his basic spiritual state, the Perfect Man perceives in the whole world nothing to disturb his cosmic balance of mind, although he does notice accurately all things that happen to him and to others. He does participate in the activities of the world together with all other men, yet at the same time, at the very core of his heart, he remains detached from the clamor and bustle of the world. Calmness and tranquility are the most salient features that characterize both the inside and outside of the Perfect Man.

Fox believes zhenren inspire us to immerse ourselves into the world and not to detach ourselves into the transcendental Dao.

Therefore it can be said that the Zhuangzi describes the behavior and attitude of what we might call the "perfectly well-adjusted person," someone who is perfectly at ease in all situations. It is not clear, however, if Zhuangzi thinks that everyone should be like this, or that everyone could be like this, or that anyone could be like this. To generalize in this fashion would itself be inconsistent with the nonformulaic personality of the text. Instead, the text simply presents us with strange and unsettling, though ultimately fascinating and compelling, stories that disturb our balance and force us to adjust. In this way, reading the text becomes a transformative project in itself.

== See also ==
- Chen Fu Zhen Ren
- Cihang Zhenren
- Junzi
- Taiyi Zhenren
- Ziran
