= Fenshen =

Legendary Taoist multilocation technique

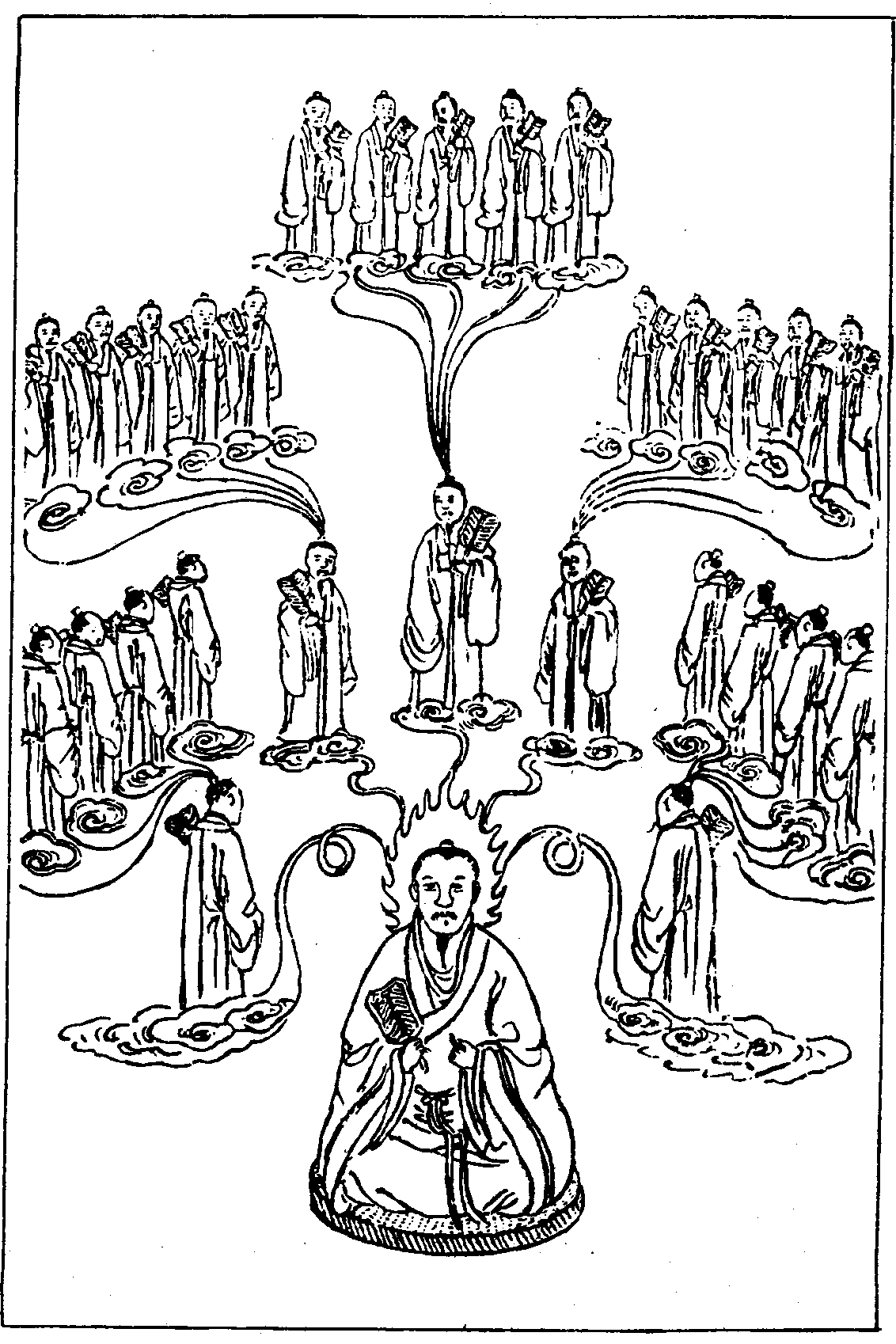
- Huashen wuwu tu (化身五五圖, Illustration of Transforming the Body Multiplied by Five), 1615 Xingming guizhi (Principles of Balanced Cultivation of Inner Nature and Vital Force)

Chinese name
- Chinese: 分身
- Literal meaning: divide body
Transcriptions
Standard Mandarin
- Hanyu Pinyin: fēnshēn
- Wade–Giles: fen-shen
Middle Chinese
- Middle Chinese: pjun syin
Old Chinese
- Baxter–Sagart (2014): pə[n] n̥i[ŋ]

Korean name
- Hangul: 분신
- Hanja: 分身
Transcriptions
- Revised Romanization: bunsin
- McCune–Reischauer: punsin

Japanese name
- Kanji: 分身
- Hiragana: ぶんしん
Transcriptions
- Revised Hepburn: bunshin

Fenxing

Chinese name
- Chinese: 分形
- Literal meaning: divide physical form
Transcriptions
Standard Mandarin
- Hanyu Pinyin: fēnxíng
- Wade–Giles: fen-hsing
Middle Chinese
- Middle Chinese: pjun heng
Old Chinese
- Baxter–Sagart (2014): pə[n] [ɢ]ˤeŋ

Korean name
- Hangul: 분형
- Hanja: 分形
Transcriptions
- Revised Romanization: bunhyeong
- McCune–Reischauer: punhyŏng

Japanese name
- Kanji: 分形
- Hiragana: ぶんけい
Transcriptions
- Revised Hepburn: bunkei

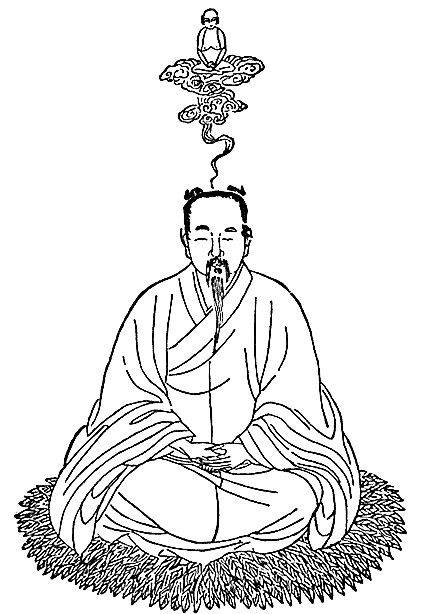
Woodcut illustration of Fenshen ganhua 分身感化 "Dividing the Body and Feeling the Transformation", from the c. 1680 The Secret of the Golden Flower

Fenshen (Chinese: 分身; lit. 'divide the body') or fenxing 分形 ("divide the physical form") was a legendary Daoist and fangshi Master of Esoterica technique for multilocation, that is, transforming or multiplying one's body into two or more identical versions. A famous story about fenshen concerns general Cao Cao ordering the execution of the alchemist Zuo Ci, who when taken into prison playfully divided himself into multiple Master Zuos; thus bamboozling the guards and escaping death.

== Terminology ==
The Chinese word fēnshēn is a compound of fēn (分; "divide, separate, split, divert; differentiate, distinguish, discriminate, demarcate") and shēn (身; "torso of a man or animal, trunk of the body, the body below the neck; by synecdoche, general term for body")."

The Chinese Hanyu Da Cidian, which is lexicographically comparable to the Oxford English Dictionary, defines fenshen (分身) with four meanings and cites earliest usages.

1. Transforming one's body into multiple bodies (一身化作数身), Hui Jiao 慧皎's c. 530 Memoirs of Eminent Monks biography of Shao Shuo 邵硕, on the same day that Shao was participating in a Chengdu procession while walking on all fours like a lion, "On that day, it was said that Shao was in Pidu District having assumed the form of a lion, and was conscious of his multiple bodies" (尔日， 郫县亦言硕作师子形，乃悟其分身也)
2. A term for dealing with other matters (谓兼顾他事), Luo Guanzhong's 14th-century Romance of the Three Kingdoms, Zhuge Liang tells Wang Ping, "even if you can be both wise and brave, you are only one person, can you divide yourself into two places? It would be yet more marvelous if you could be one general going together" (平 纵然智勇，只可当一头，岂可分身两处？须再得一将同去为妙)
3. As if cutting up the body (犹分尸), c. 1478 Story of Hua Guan suo, Emperor Guangwu of Han "apprehended the traitorous usurper" Wang Mang "And in the Tower Bathed by Water hacked him to pieces" (捉住篡国贼 王莽 ，旋台剐割碎分身).
4. "Buddhist term, the Buddha's wish to teach all living beings in the worlds of all directions, using the power of upaya to physically manifest in each world as a mark of attaining Buddhahood, called fenshen." (佛教语。佛为欲化导十方世界之众生，而以方便力，于各世界示现成佛之相，谓之分身。), Dharmarakṣa's c. 286 Chinese Lotus Sutra translation, "I divide myself into various Buddhas existing in the worlds of all directions in order to expound the dharma" (我分身诸佛，在於十方世界说法).

The near synonym fēnshén (分神; "transformation of the spirit"), with shén (神; "god; deity; spirit; soul; mind") for shen ("body"), translates as "give some attention to; divert attention to; distraction", as used in fēnshénbùxiá (分神不暇; "unable to be in two places at the same time")." Compare the terms biànshén (變身; "transform the body") and biànshén (變神; "transform the spirit") referring to a meditator identifying with a specific deity or the entire cosmos.

The term fēnxíng (分形), with 形; "outward form, appearance, shape; physical form of human being, often contrasted with spiritual essence"", was synonymous with fenshen in early Daoist texts.

The Hanyu Da Cidian defines fenxing (分形) with two meanings and cites their earliest usages

1. Description of presenting all kinds of form/shapes (谓呈现各种形态), Zhang Heng's c. 106 Xijing fu (西京賦; "Rhapsody on the Western Capital"), "Amazing magicians, quicker than the eye, Changed appearance, sundered bodies. (奇幻儵忽，易貌分形), Swallowed knives, exhaled fire." (tr. Knechgtes 1982: 231).
2. To separate (分离), Bao Zhao's early 5th-century poem "Presented to my old friend Ma Ziqiao" (赠故人马子乔), "Paired swords about to be parted, First cry out from inside their case. Mist and rain mixing as evening approaches, From this point on they separate their forms (双剑将别离，先在匣中鸣，烟雨交将夕，从此遂分形)."

Chinese Buddhist terminology uses fenshen (分身; "dividing the body") referring to the temporal huàshēn (化身; "transformation bodies; nirmāṇakāya") of the Buddha, "with which he teaches and saves living beings, a Buddha's power to reproduce himself ad infinitum and anywhere"; and fenxing (分形; "varied manifestation") means "to manifest in different forms for different beings simultaneously" (Digital Dictionary of Buddhism). In general usage, huashen (化身) means "incarnation; embodiment; personification".

In Sino-Japanese vocabulary, bunshin 分身 (borrowed from fenshen) translates as "a branch; an offshoot; [in self-reference] the other self; one's alter ego; [Buddhism] incarnations of the Buddha", and is used in bunshin no jutsu 分身の術 (from fēnshēnshù) "magic to create body-doubles".

Standard Chinese usage has semantically modernized both these ancient Daoist "body division" words: fenshen is Internet slang for sockpuppet and fenxing is mathematical jargon for fractal.

== Translations ==
Translating Chinese fenshen and fenxing into English is problematic owing to numerous different stories about how Daoist and Buddhist masters could multiply themselves. The narratives describe body division as more of an ephemeral incarnation than a perpetual reincarnation, and involve elements of shapeshifting, body double, alter ego, doppelganger, avatar, personification, embodiment, and astral projection.

English translations of ancient fenshen and fenxing include:

- "multiplying the body"
- "divide the body", "ubiquity"
- "create dual images of oneself", "body splitting"
- "body division", "dividing oneself", "divide one's form"
- "create body-doubles"
- "multiplication of the body"
- "dividing oneself", "replicating oneself"

In present-day usage, English translation equivalents for fenshen expressions include:

- fēnshēn (分身; "spare time from one's main work to attend to [something] else")
- fēnshēnbùxiá (分身不暇; "unable to be in two places at the same time; unable to disengage oneself")
- fēnshēnfǎ (分身法; "means to divide oneself (for various tasks)")
- fēnshēnshù (分身术; "magic of replicating oneself")
- fēnshēnfáshù (分身乏术; "lack the art of dividing oneself; to find it hard to be in two places at once; unable to show up at all the places where one is needed; unable to do all the things one has to do")

== Textual examples ==
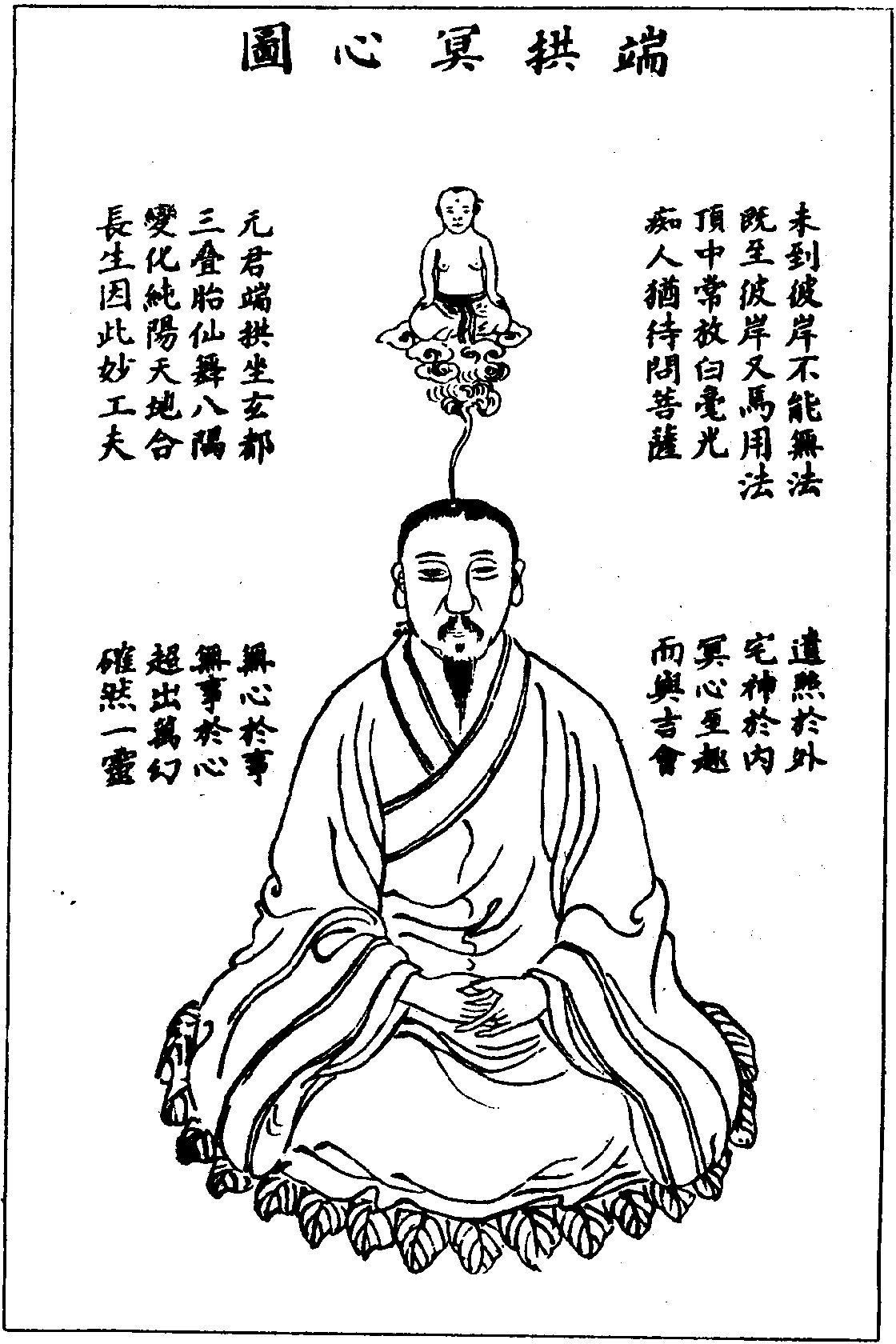
Woodcut illustration of neidan meditation Duangong mingxin (端拱冥心; "Sitting with Hands Clasped and Mind Undifferentiated"), from the 1615 Xingming guizhi

Chinese texts began to record fenshen and fenxing in the 3rd and 4th centuries CE.

=== Bowuzhi ===
Zhang Hua's c. 290 Bowuzhi "Records of Diverse Matters" names sixteen historical fangshi brought together by Cao Cao, a powerful general at the end of the Han dynasty (206 BCE-220 CE), including Zuo Ci who could biànxíng (變形; "change form; transform").

The names of the 'Master of Technic' whom Cao Cao assembled were Wang Zhen [王真] from Shangdang, Feng Junda [封君達] from Longxi, Gan Shi [甘始] from Ganling [甘陵], Lu Nu Sheng [魯女生], and Hua Tuo, styled Yuanhua, from the land of Qiao; Dongguo Yannian [東郭延年], Tang Yu [唐霅], Leng Shou Guang [冷壽光], Pu Shi [卜式] from Henan, Zhang Diao [張貂], Ji Zixun [薊子訓], Fei Chang Fang [費長房] from Runan, Xian Nu Gu [鮮奴辜], and Zhao Sheng Shi [趙聖卿], the military official for the Wei, from Henan; Que Jian [卻儉], styled Mengjie, from Yangcheng, and Zuo Ci, styled Yuanfang, from Lujiang.

The above sixteen, according to statements made by [Cao Cao's sons] emperor Wen of the Wei (i.e. Cao Pi), the king of Dong'e (i.e. Cao Zhi), and Zong Changtong [仲長統], could all refrain from eating grains, make themselves invisible, and go in and out without passing over the threshold of the door. Zuo Ci could change his form [能变形], deceive people's vision and hearing, dispel evil spirits and the like. They were the sort of people whom the Record of the Rites of Zhou (Zhouli) calls 'mystifiers of the common folk' [怪民] and the Wangzhi [chapter of the Liji] refers to as 'Holding to the Left path' [挾左道者].

=== Baopuzi ===
The earliest reliable descriptions of fenshen and fenxing are found in two c. 320 texts compiled by the Jin Dynasty Daoist scholar Ge Hong (282-343), the Baopuzi or Master who Embraces Simplicity and the Shenxian Zhuan or Biographies of Divine Transcendents.

Two Baopuzi Inner Chapters mention multiplying or dividing the body. "Truth on Earth" (18, 地真) uses fenxing (分形; "divide the body") twice, xingfen (形分; "body division") once, and shenfen (身分; "body division") once. The context describes three meditation techniques, Shou xuanyi (守玄一; "Guarding the Mysterious One"), Shouyi (守一; "Guarding the One"), and Mingjing (明鏡; "Bright Mirror").

Mystery-Unity is seen only in the sun. The search for It begins in the sun, and is described as "knowing white and preserving black" [所謂知白守黑] or "unsuccessful in the desire for death" [欲死不得者也]. To begin with, you must purify yourself and fast for a hundred days. Only then may you go to a teacher and seek It, but then It can be obtained in not more than three or four days; once you possess It you will never lose It provided you take steps to preserve It. The preservation of Mystery-Unity consists in imagining yourself as being divided into three persons [守玄一並思其身分為三人]. Once these three have become visible, you can continue to increase the number to several dozen, all like yourself [三人已見又轉益之可至數十人皆如己身], who may be concealed or revealed, and all of whom are automatically in possession of secret oral directions. This may be termed a process for multiplying the body [此所謂分形之道]. Through this method [Zuo Ci], [Ji Liao], and my uncle [Ge Xuan] could be in several dozen places at one time. When guests were present they could be one host speaking the guests in the house, another host greeting guests beside the stream, and still another host making casts with his fishing line, but the guests were unable to distinguish which was he true one.

Robinet notes that Ge Xuan's mundane activities do not distract him from the "major occupation of all Taoists—dreaming alongside running water".

The context continues with Ge Hong quoting "my teacher", Zheng Yin 鄭隱 who was a disciple of Ge Xuan, about methods for body multiplication.

My teacher used to say that to preserve Unity was to practice jointly Bright Mirror [守一兼修明鏡], and that on becoming successful in the mirror procedure a man would be able to multiply his body to several dozen all with the same dress and facial expression [能分形為數十人衣服面貌皆如一也]. My teacher also used to say that you should take the great medicines diligently if you wished to enjoy Fullness of Life [欲長生當勤服大藥], and that you should use metal solutions and a multiplication of your person if you wished to communicate with the gods [欲得通神當金水分形]. By multiplying the body, the three Hun and the seven Po are automatically seen within the body [形分則自見其身中之三魂七魄], and in addition it becomes possible to meet and visit with the powers of heaven and the deities of earth and to have all the gods of the mountains and rivers in one's service.

This "metal solutions" translates jīnshuǐ (金水; "Gold Water"), referring to Gold Liquor, an alchemical elixir prepared from gold, mercury, saltpeter, and realgar.

"Looking Farther Afield" (19, 遐覽) uses huaxing (化形; "transform the body") and fenxing ("divide the body") referring to a lost text, the Yunu yinwei (玉女隱微; "Latency of the Jade Woman").

By its method people can change into flying birds or stalking animals [化形為飛禽走獸]. Clouds are raised and rain brought for an area a hundred miles square by means of metal, wood, jade, or rock. Snow can be produced in the same fashion. By its method people cross large streams without a boat or weir. They split themselves into thousands of persons [分形為千人]. They fly high on the winds; pass in and out of barriers; exhale breath of seven colors. While sitting still, they can see into all eight points of the compass and even to things underground. They emit light shining for thousands of feet; in a dark room, they are their own light. The book does indeed teach a great art.

The three xian transcendents Zuo Ci 左慈, Ge Xuan 葛玄, and Ji Liao 薊遼 or Li Zixun 薊子訓 mentioned as masters of fenxing are more fully described in Guo's other compilation below.

=== Shenxian zhuan ===
Five Shenxian zhuan hagiographies of Daoist xian describe fenxing (分形) or fenshen (分身) body division, usually resulting from the adept taking waidan alchemical elixirs.

First, Zhang Daoling (34-156 CE), first patriarch of the Way of the Celestial Masters, founded the Way of the Five Pecks of Rice movement in 142, and eventually controlled a prosperous theocratic state in present-day Sichuan.

On account of all this, Zhang Ling obtained much wealth, which he used to buy the necessary medicinal ingredients for synthesizing elixirs. When the elixirs were completed, he ingested only half the dosage, not wishing to ascend to Heaven immediately. As a result, he gained the ability to divide himself into several dozen persons [能分形化作數十人]. Now, there was a pond outside the gate of Zhang's residence, on which he frequently went boating to amuse himself. Meanwhile, however, many Daoist guests would be going and coming in his courtyard. There would always be one Zhang Ling in the courtyard, conversing, eating, and drinking with these guests, while the real Zhang was out on the pond.

Second, Zuo Ci was a Daoist master who allegedly obtained the alchemical classics Scripture of Nine Elixirs and the Scripture of Gold Liquor from inside a cave on Mount Tianzhu, and mastering their techniques made him become "capable of transforming into a myriad different forms". Zuo uses his shapeshifting ability both to amuse and to taunt rulers. "Behind the amusing and the taunting lies a single lesson: transcendence-seeking adepts are of a superior order of being; rulers' appropriate response to them is respect and veneration, and any attempts to dominate or manipulate are futile.".

During the end of the Han dynasty (189-220 CE), the prominent general Cao Cao became Grand chancellor and founded what later became the state of Cao Wei. When Cao Cao heard of Zuo Ci's supernatural powers, including the ability to live without eating, he summoned him to court and incarcerated Zuo under supervision without any food for one year. Upon seeing that Zuo had remained in perfect health, Cao concluded that he was a sorcerer, and decided to execute him. Zuo Ci immediately realized Cao's intent, managed to magically disappear, and returned home.

Duke Cao was now even more determined to have him killed, and he also wanted to test whether Zuo could avoid death, so he gave orders to have him apprehended. As Cao's men approached, Zuo fled into a flock of sheep, and his pursuers, losing sight of him, suspected that he might have transformed himself into one of the sheep. They had the sheep counted. Originally there had been an even thousand of them, but now there was one extra, so they knew that Zuo had indeed transformed himself. They announced: "Master Zuo, if you're in there, just come out; we won't hurt you." Then one of the sheep knelt down and spoke words, saying, "Who would have thought I'd be pardoned?" When the pursuers tried to seize that one sheep, all of the other sheep knelt down and said, "Who would have thought I'd be pardoned?" So the pursuers [gave up and] left.

Later on, someone learned Zuo Ci's whereabouts and informed Cao Cao, he once again sent soldiers who captured him. Although Zuo could have escaped, he deliberately allowed himself to be arrested in order to demonstrate his divine transformations.

He was taken into prison. When the guards there were ready to torture and interrogate him, there was one Zuo inside the cell door and another Zuo outside it, and they did not know which one to torture. When Cao was informed, he despised Zuo even more, and ordered that he be taken out of the city and killed. As they were taking him out of the city, Zuo suddenly vanished. So they locked the city gates and searched for him. It was announced that [they were searching for a man who] was blind in one eye and wearing a linen cloth wrapped on his head and a one-layer gown. The moment this announcement was made, the entire city full of people, numbering several tens of thousands, all turned into men blind in one eye wearing a linen cloth on their head and a one-layer gown. So in the end they did not know which one to seize. Cao then put out an all-points order that Zuo Ci was to be killed on sight. Someone saw and recognized Zuo, so they beheaded him and presented [the head] to Cao. Cao was overjoyed. When he inspected the head, however, it turned out to be only a bundle of straw. When someone went back to search for Zuo's corpse, it had vanished.

Specifically, the one-eyed men all wore qing gejin danyi (青葛巾單衣; "a green kudzu-cloth headwrap and an unlined garment"). Zuo Ci used what was later called bingjie (兵解; "escape by execution"), an uncommon form of shijie "escape by means of a simulated corpse", and the Baopuzi says, "Zuo Ci performed 'martial escape' [兵解; bingjie] but did not die.

Third, the Shenxian zhuan has a detailed biography of Ge Xuan (164–244), who was the great-uncle of the compiler Ge Hong, that mentions fenxing. The first line states that Ge Xuan was a student of Zuo Ci who gave him the alchemical Scripture on the Elixirs of the Nine [Tripods] and the Scripture on the Elixir of Gold Liquor.

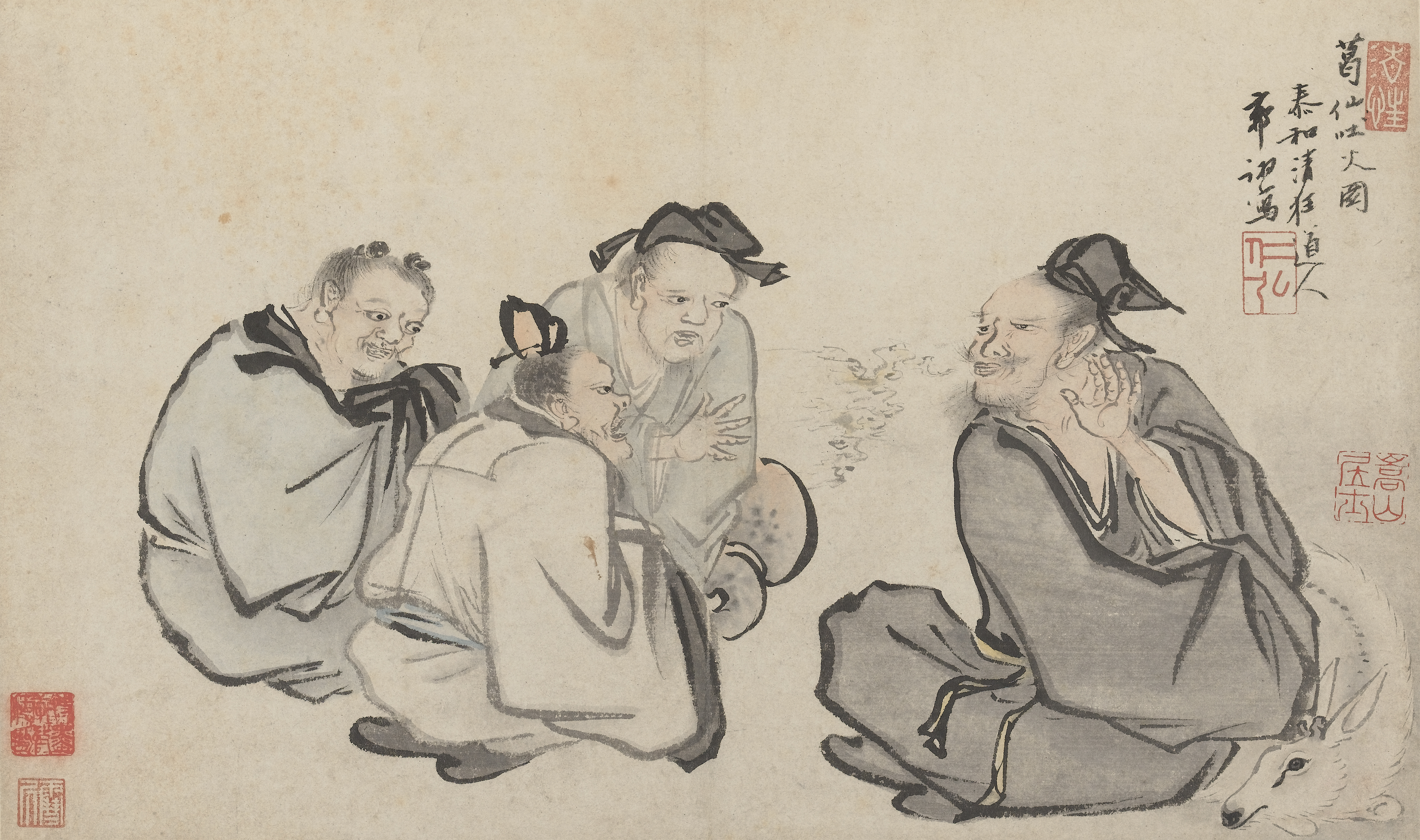
Ge Xuan breathing fire to warm his guests

A narrative about Ge Xuan entertaining visitors, compare Zhang Daoling above, mentions body division.

Ge Xuan often entertained guests. He would go out to welcome the latecomers, while, meantime, seated and talking with the other guests was another Ge Xuan. When sending guests off, he did the same thing. [Once] when the weather was cold Ge told his guests, "It is impossible in my humble abode for each of you to have his own fire, but I invite you to warm yourselves in common." He then opened his mouth and exhaled flames, which quickly filled the room. All of the guests felt as if they were under a bright sun, but neither were they too warm.

Fourth, the hagiography of Ji Liao 薊遼 or Ji Zixun 薊子訓 records that he was famous for his paranormal abilities, including bringing back to life a dead child who Ji had accidentally killed. Many aristocrats in the capital of Chang'an wanted to meet Ji Zixun, and when they learned that Ji's young next-door neighbor was a student at the Imperial Academy, they promised that if he could get Ji to come to the capital, they would ensure that the student passed his exams and would become a wealthy official. Ji Zixun agreed in order to help his neighbor and gave a day when he would come to Chang'an. On that day, Ji left in the morning and arrived at the capital before noon, having traveled over a thousand li ("Chinese miles") in a few hours, he then asked the student,

"So, who wants to see me?" "A great many people want to see you, Master," said the student. "We don't want to keep them waiting. Just let me know where you'll be staying, and I'll see that they all come to you." Ji replied, "They don't need to come here. I've just traveled a thousand li; don't you think we can manage this? Tell each of them today to start preparing for a guest. I will set out at noon and will decide at the last minute whom I shall visit first." The student, as instructed, relayed this message to the notables, each of whom sprinkled and swept his chambers. Precisely at noon, Ji Zixun went to each one of the twenty-three places in question. There were twenty-three Ji's, one at each residence. Each of the notables was delighted, thinking that he was the first to have been visited by Ji. When they met the next day, as arranged, to compare experiences, they realized that they had each simultaneously had a Ji Zixun in their home. The clothing and countenance of each one was the same; only their discourse was different, depending on what questions each host had asked the guest to answer. Furthermore, each host had laid out food and drink for Ji, and he had partaken of them with complete appropriateness at each place. People near and far were astonished by this.

Although the aristocrats clamored to see more of Ji he was not interested and said he was going to leave.

Just after he had cleared the gate, the lane outside was clogged with a crowd of notables arriving there. The student said to them, "He has just left. He will be the one heading east, riding a gray mule." At this, each of them spurred his horse to chase after Ji. From a distance it appeared that the mule was sauntering along at a leisurely pace, but none of the horses could catch up to him. This went on for half a day, with the distance between them always holding steady at about one li. In the end none of them could catch up, so they quit and returned home.

Calling this account of Ji Zixun escaping astride his slow mule "a fine narrative expression of the near-yet-far, accessible-yet-not quality of the transcendent and his arts", Campany says "his feat of body division" (fenxing or fenshen) multilocality is one of the most vivid depictions of this art" in the Shenxian zhuan.

Fifth, the later-attested hagiography for Yuzi 玉子 Jade Master includes fenxing in a list of supernatural abilities.

He was thoroughly versed in the meanings of the Five Phases, using them to nourish his nature; cure illnesses; dispel misfortune; instantly call forth wind, clouds, thunder, and rain; and change plants, rocks, and pottery into domestic animals, dragons, and tigers. He could divide his form so as to become several hundred thousand at once [分形為數百千人], and he could walk on rivers and seas. By spitting out water, he could form pearls and jades, and they would not revert [to water]. He could make horses from balls of mud, and they would go a thousand li in a day.

== Methods ==
In Daoist hagiographies, adepts who have mastered bianhua "transformation; metamorphosis" are portrayed as autonomously free from normal spatiotemporal limitations. Isabelle Robinet describes this transcendent state as possessing "the gift of ubiquity, [fenxing], which literally means to divide the body into many parts".

[T]hrough "body division" (fenshen 分身), they are able to be at several places at once, they disappear at will, they transform their appearance into that of other persons or species, pass through walls and rocks, slip into tiny spaces as well as across dimensions of time, enter water without getting wet and pass through fire without burning, walk on water, secure fruit out of season, and magically produce foods, water sources, and fire.

The above textual examples have mentioned several techniques for obtaining the faculty of body division, and later texts give many others.

The Baopuzi describes two methods for dividing oneself. Zuo Ci, Ji Liao, and Ge Xuan used the Guarding the [Mysterious] One method that requires ritual fasting and purification before learning how to envision oneself into three selves, and then up to several dozen. By simultaneously practicing the Guarding the Mysterious One and Bright Mirror methods, an adept can multiply their body into dozens of selves, and if one wants to communicate with the gods, one needs to consume Gold Liquor and multiply the body by making one's three hun and seven po souls appear.

Four of the five Shenxian zhuan hagiographies concerning body division also mention using waidan alchemical elixirs: Zhang Daoling, Zuo Ci, Ge Xuan, and Yuzi. According to Daoist legends, these masters of body division most commonly split into around two dozen duplicate selves; Zhang and Ge both used fenshen or fenxing for entertaining all their guests, and Ji Liao simultaneously appeared at twenty-three places. The highest number of duplications is ascribed to Yuzi who was supposedly able to divide himself into several hundred thousand Yuzis. Zuo Ci was the most famous master of body division, he shapeshifted into a sheep, divided into at least two identical selves, and simultaneously transformed himself and tens of thousands of city residents into identical one-eyed men wearing a green kudzu-cloth head wrap and an unlined garment.

In contrast to early fenshen and fenxing techniques based upon laboratory waidan external alchemy, many later methods involved meditational neidan internal alchemy. The c. 1029 Yunji Qiqian Daoist encyclopedia gives methods for creating a yingren (影人; "shadow person") human simulacrum by means of mental concentration. Such figures, only several inches tall, are substitutes for the adept, and act as representatives who roam the heavens in order to secure beneficial influences for the adept. The 12th-century Daoshu 道樞 Pivot of the Dao compendium refers to a method of the "ancient sages" that enables one to fenxing divide the body by gazing at one's shadow [分形散影], as well as by gazing at one's reflection in a metal or water mirror. Other methods consist of envisioning oneself, or one's distinctive hun soul, entering the Palace of the Taiji Supreme Ultimate or ascending into the heavens accompanied by the three divinities of the Dantian, or else fusing with the Taiyi Supreme One. In their exercises, the Daoists "divide their bodies into a thousand persons, pace the void and go where they will" (太丹隱書; Taidan yinshu), "divide their breaths and expand their bodies" (上清原始變化寶真上經; Yuanshi bianhua baozhen shangjing), and "divide their light into a thousand bodies" (神州七轉七變舞天經; Shenzhou qizhuan qibian wutian jing).

== See also ==
- Sung Chi-li, notorious Taiwan cult leader who claims to achieve fenshen body division
- Omnipresence
