= Shijie (Taoism) =

Daoist technique to avoid the underworld

- Seal script for Shijie 尸解
- Traditional Chinese: 屍解
- Simplified Chinese: 尸解
- Literal meaning: corpse release
Transcriptions
Standard Mandarin
- Hanyu Pinyin: shījiě
- Wade–Giles: shih-chieh
Middle Chinese
- Middle Chinese: syij kɛX
Old Chinese
- Baxter–Sagart (2014): l̥əJ kˁreʔ

Shijie, (simplified Chinese: 尸解; traditional Chinese: 屍解; pinyin: Shijie; Wade–Giles: shih-chieh; lit. 'corpse release') which has numerous translations such as liberation from the corpse and release by means of a corpse, is an esoteric Daoist technique for an adept to transform into a xian ("transcendent; immortal"), typically using some bureaucratic ruse to evade the netherworld administrative system of life and death registration. The many varieties of shijie range from deceitful cases, such as a person feigning death by substituting the corpse of their recently deceased grandfather as their own, to supernatural cases, such as jianjie (劍解; "sword liberation") using a waidan alchemical sword to temporarily create a corpse-simulacrum, which enables one to escape and assume a new identity.

== Terminology ==
=== Shijie ===
The Chinese term shijie compounds the words shi (尸; 屍; "corpse; body") and jiě (解; "separate; divide; cut apart"), and has been described as a "rather strange name", "notoriously slippery term", with "the potential for confusion", and sometimes "misrepresented or interpreted in a way too vague to be intelligible".

Shī (尸) has three sets of English translation equivalents in Paul W. Kroll's dictionary of Classical Chinese and Medieval Chinese:

1. person serving as a surrogate for the deceased in a sacrificial ceremony, the impersonator ... memorial tablet
2. corpse, lich; cadaver ... lay out a corpse; expose a corpse
3. be in charge of, have the care or supervision of ... occupy a position without performing the duties attached to it

Shi's first equivalent of the ceremonial personator who was a stand-in for a deceased relative ("corpse") during Chinese funeral rituals and ancestral rites is a semantic extension of the basic meaning "corpse". Campany describes the shi "impersonator of deceased ancestors, one who sat in their place during the solemn presentation of food, drink, and announcements and the performance of dances".

Besides the usual meaning of "corpse, dead body", shi 尸 can sometimes mean "body, mortal body"—particularly in shijie contexts. Joseph Needham translates shijie as "release from the mortal part", which is more appropriate than "release from the corpse" because the first step in achieving shijie transcendence is to abandon one's corporeal body. Anna Seidel points out that shi in the term shijie denotes "all the corruptible aging factors of the physical body," rather than the corpse itself. Fabrizio Pregadio cites a classic Daoist text that clearly uses the word shi to denote "not specifically a corpse, but in general the 'mortal body', either living or dead". A passage in the c. 200 CE Xiang'er commentary to the Daodejing (see below) contrasts shisi (尸死) and shisheng (尸生), which cannot be read literally to mean "a corpse dies" and "a corpse lives". "When the mortal body dies (shisi), that is wearing out; when the mortal body lives (shisheng), that is accomplishment"; this context refers to options for a living person, and not to a postmortem renewal; "its subject, in other words, is not the 'corpse' but the 'mortal body'". However, Campany contends that what is escaped through shijie is not the adept's shi dead body but the administrative system of death registration.

Owing to the ambiguities of reading the original Chinese character 尸 for shi "corpse; mortal body; personator of the dead; etc.", the basic meaning of "corpse" is clarified with the character shi (屍) that adds si (死; "die; death") to shi 尸. Compare the word sǐshī (死屍; 'dead corpse') meaning "corpse; dead body".

Jie (解) has seven sets of English translation equivalents in Kroll's dictionary:

1. untie, unknot, loosen, release ... doff, take off
2. disjoint, dismember ... dissect; analyze, take apart
3. remove, eliminate ... resolve; (find a) solution, work out (a problem)
4. deliver from, release, liberate, free oneself from; emancipate
5. dissipate, dissolve; disperse; dispel
6. open out; unfurl, unfold; reveal
7. explain, expound; exposition ...

Kroll gives shijie as a usage example under both shi 2. and jie 4., glossed as "'deliverance by means of a [simulated] corpse,' in which the adept's supposed corpse is buried but is actually substituted with a personal object (sword, staff, etc.) that temporarily takes on the appearance of the corpse, thus allowing one to escape from the bureaucracy of death; a lower-level means of transcendence."

Scholars propose divergent semantic interpretations of the jie in shijie: "to molt," "to quarter," "to expel an affliction"; "to divide, separate, disperse, to detach, deliver", "to loosen, dissolve, explain", and "emancipation, liberation" in Chinese Buddhism; and "release, deliverance, escape". The ancient shijie is related with the medical term shītǐ jiěpu (屍體解剖; "autopsy; postmortem examination") that combines shītǐ (屍體; "corpse; remains") with jiěpōu (解剖; "dissect").

=== Varieties ===
The forms of shijie are quite diverse, in its broadest meaning, the term sometimes simply denotes disappearance, "to depart on a journey through foreign lands." It more commonly designates a type of disappearance that leaves a trace behind, such as a body without its bones, or a coffin that contains only a symbolic staff, sword, or sandal. Sometimes shijie can even refer to an adept who comes back to life after apparent death.

The French sinologist Isabelle Robinet compares the common forms of shijie.

- Jianjie (劍解; "deliverance by a sword") is considered the most noble shijie method. This technique requires either an inferior "simple sword" or a divine "magical sword" that enables one "to return to your old village under another name" since the subterranean officials no longer have any hold on those who have performed it.
- Bingjie (兵解; "deliverance by a military weapon" or "escape by execution") is the liberation of those who have been executed, such as the famous Zuo Ci (155–220) who continued to be seen alive in Jingzhou despite the fact that Cao Cao was in possession of his head and the rest of his body had disappeared.
- Wenjie (文解; "peaceful deliverance"), which contrasts with bingjie, involves replacing the body with sandals or a staff. Maxime Kaltenmark showed that Daoist magical sandals are birds, which enable the adept to soar aloft and fly away, similar with jianjie.
- Shuijie (水解; "deliverance by water") is when the body of a drowned person is protected by a compassionate divinity, "On the outside it is said that he drowned; on the inside, in truth, he is secretly saved."
- Huojie (火解; "deliverance by fire") involves a Daoist who is burned alive and apparently flies away in the form of a bird. In certain cases, the adept's body undergoes spontaneous human combustion, such as Cai Jing (蔡經), whose body burned for three days until his bones dissolved and "only his outer skin was left, intact from head to foot, like a cicada shell."

Another variation is zhangjie (杖解; "staff-liberated"), when the adept's bamboo staff served as a temporary stand-in for his real body, which was transformed and vanished away to the realm of the immortals.

=== Related terms ===
shijie is similar to the word bianhua ("transformation; metamorphosis") and its synonymous components bian (變; "change; alter") and hua (化; "change; transform"). For instance, the 499 Zhen'gao refers to a superior method of shijie called huadun (化遁; "to transform and escape"), and mentions tuohua dunbian (託化遁變; "to simulate transformation and hide by metamorphosis"); and the 983 Taiping Yulan describes shijie dunbian (尸解遁變; "delivered from the body and transformed by escaping"). All types of bianhua require a material support, and shijie generally involves "going away by making use of a material object." However, there is an essential difference between them. Bianhua is a magical trick or the manipulation of a power that the mystic can use while alive; shijie is only practiced at the end of life and is a form of deliverance linked with the purification and refinement of the body.

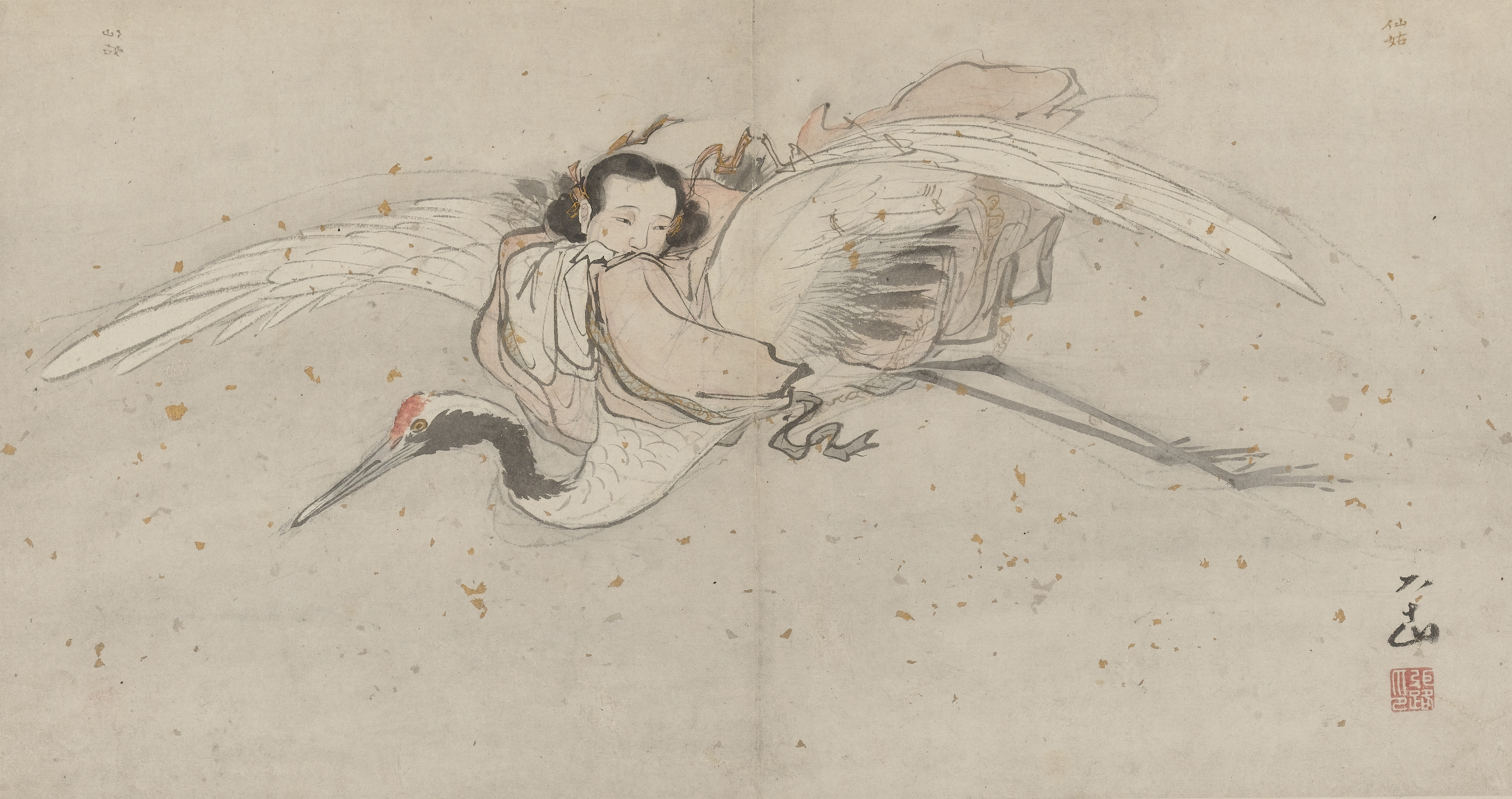
He Xiangu flying on a crane; painting by Zhang Lu (1464–1538)

The huà (化; "change; transform; convert") in bianhua occurs in several Daoist alternative terms for shijie. Jiěhuà—with the jie "release; etc." in shijie—means "liberate the mortal body and attain the Dao". Xiāohuà (銷化)—with "melt away; disintegrate"—means "release the physical body and transform into a xian" (see the Shiji below). Yǔhuà (羽化)—with "feather; wing"—refers to an insect "growing wings; eclosion", which Daoists semantically extended to "die and become a xian flying up to heaven". Wings are a common feature in depictions of xian, either riding a mythological flying creature or flying with their own wings (compare 羽人; yǔrén; "xian transcendent/immortal; Daoist priest", using the character "person").

As detailed in "Early textual usages" below, the term xingjie (形解; "release of the form"), with xíng (形; "outward form, appearance, shape; figure, configuration; structure, contour, outline"), was a near synonym of shijie ("release from the corpse") that was recorded several centuries earlier.

Tuōsǐ (託死; "feign death; simulate death, later written 托死") frequently occurs in shijie contexts. Compare the Chinese Buddhist term tuōshēng (托生; "be reincarnated") that was also used in early Daoist texts.

== Translations ==
The term shijie has been "variously and often poorly translated". Translational difficulty stems from shi "corpse", and the term is usually rendered "liberation or deliverance from the corpse". However, Kirkland points out that in most accounts of shijie the subject did not actually die, and although all the appearances of death were involved, no corpse was really left behind.

English translations include:

- "deliverance of the corpse"
- "corpse-freed", "release as a corpse
- "corpse-free", "liberation from the corpse", "release from the mortal part"
- "deliverance from the corpse"
- "liberation by means of a corpse"
- "liberation from the corpse"
- "release from the corpse"
- "liberation from the corpse"
- "body liberation"
- "escape by means of a simulated corpse"
- "release by means of a corpse", "mortuary liberation"
- "deliverance from the corpse"
- "deliverance by means of a [simulated] corpse"
- "release from the mortal body"

Within this sample, shi is usually translated as "corpse", and jie most commonly as "liberation" or "release".

== Early textual usages ==
The word shijie ("release from/of the corpse") is first recorded in the c. 80 CE Lunheng below, but its near synonym xingjie (形解; "release from the form") occurs in earlier texts dating from around the 3rd to 1st centuries BCE. They do not use xingjie to denote a specific Daoist practice or method, but as general ways of transcending one's limited individuality. While shijie and xingjie are both instances of transcending the mortal body, they are not exactly the same, "release from the corpse" requires undergoing death but "release from the form" does not.

=== Zhuangzi ===
First, xingjie "release from the form" refers to a spiritual epiphany in the c. 3rd–2nd century BCE Zhuangzi story about Tian Zifang (田子方, Sir Square Field) praising his teacher Dongguo Xunzi (東郭順子, Sir Accord of Easturb) to the Marquess Wen of Wei (r. 446–397 BCE).

After Sir Square went out, Marquis Wen spent the rest of the day in a state of dumb uncertainty. Then he summoned before him the officials who were standing on duty and said to them, "How far we are from the gentleman of complete integrity. At first I considered the words of the sages and the wise men, the practice of humaneness and righteousness to be the ultimate. But now that I have heard about Sir Square's teacher, my physical form is unstrung and I have no desire to move [吾形解而不欲動]; my mouth is clamped shut and I have no desire to speak. What I have emulated is only an earthen image, and the state of Wei has truly been an encumbrance to me."

=== Shiwen ===
Second, the term xingjie (形解; "release of the form") describes an advanced self-cultivation exercise in the Shiwen (十問; "Ten Questions"), a previously-unknown medical book within the c. 200–168 BCE Mawangdui Silk Texts that archeologists discovered in a Western Han tomb. The fourth of the Shiwen's ten dialogues (MSVI.A.4) is between the mythical Yellow Emperor and Rong Cheng (容成), a legendary ancient master of Daoist sexual practices and Daoyin breath circulation techniques, who says,

Longevity is born of growth and accumulation. As for the fullness of that life: above it scans heaven and below it spreads over earth. The person who is capable of it invariably becomes a spirit. Thus he is capable of achieving release of the form. The person who perceives the great way skims the clouds as he moves. … like water flowing he can range far; like the dragon ascending he can rise high.

This is the only Shiwen passage that reflects the likely influence of xian or "syncretistic-Daoist" ideas about transcendence/immortality in the Mawangdui and Zhangjiashan bamboo medical texts, which primarily discuss maintaining health and attaining longevity. Harper notes that xingjie "release from the form" is thought to be synonymous with shijie "release from the corpse", which for the Daoist believer, marked the moment of xian transformation when a new, immortal physique was perfected and the mortal body sloughed off, leaving behind a husk-like corpse (or an object such as a sword or staff) as evidence that the adept had achieved shijie. However, it is evident that xingjie in this Shiwen context, with references to "becoming a spirit" above and rising "like the dragon", does not represent the concepts of shijie in religious Daoism.

=== Shiji ===
Third, xingjie names a supernatural technique in Sima Qian's c. 94 BCE Shiji (Records of the Historian) passage denouncing the practices performed by some fangshi ("masters of the methods") from the state of Yan who arrived at the First Emperor of Qin's court. These masters "practiced methods for immortality [僊道] and for the release from the form through dissolution and transformation [形解銷化], relying on services offered to gods and demons." The Shiji commentary cites Fu Qian 服虔 (c. 125-c. 195 CE), who glosses xingjie (形解) as shijie (尸解).

The abtruse meaning of this phrase xingjie xiaohua (形解銷化) is illustrated in other translations:

- "deliverance from the body which is dissolved and transformed"
- "release of the form and fluxing transformation"
- "shed their mortal forms and melted away"

Based upon this term xiao (銷; "melt [esp. metal]; dissolve"), some scholars (e.g., Robinet) believe xiaohua alludes to waidan External Alchemy practices, but Pregadio disagrees and says it refers to "thaumaturgic methods for replicating and multiplying one's form (ubiquity), or for dissolving it and hiding it (invisibility)".

=== Lunheng ===
A cicada nymph molting its exoskeleton and transforming into a winged adult.

The iconoclastic philosopher Wang Chong's c. 80 CE Lunheng (Balanced Inquiries) has earliest known occurrences of the term shijie "separation from the body".

The Daoxu (道虛; "Daoist Untruths") chapter uses shijie six times in a passage refuting the legend that Li Shaojun, a Daoist fangshi in the court of Emperor Wu of Han (r. 141-87), was several hundred years old when he died.

The ordinary students of Tao have not Li Shao Chün’s age. Before reaching a hundred years they die like all the others. Yet uncultured and ignorant people still hold that they are separated from their bodies, and vanish, and that, as a matter of fact, they do not die. What is understood by separation from the body? Does it mean that the body dies, and the spirit disappears? Or that the body does not die, but drops its coil? If one says that the body dies, and the spirit is lost, there is no difference from death, and every one is a genius. And if one believes that the body does not die, but throws off its coil, one must admit that the bones and the flesh of all the deceased Taoists are intact and in no wise different from the corpses of ordinary mortals. When the cricket leaves its chrysalis, the tortoise drops its shell, the snake its skin, and the stag its horns, in short, when the horned and skinned animals lose their outward cover, retaining only their flesh and bones, one might speak of the separation from the body. But even if the body of a dead Taoist were similar to a chrysalis, one could not use this expression, because, when the cricket leaves the chrysalis, it cannot be considered as a spirit with regard to the chrysalis. Now to call it a separation from the body, when there is not even a similarity with the chrysalis, would again be an unfounded assertion missing the truth. The Grand Annalist [i.e., Sima Qian, the Shiji compiler] was a contemporary of Li Shao Chün. Although he was not amongst those who came near to Li Shao Chün’s body, when he had expired, he was in a position to learn the truth. If he really did not die, but only parted with his body, the Grand Annalist ought to have put it on record, and would not have given the place of his death.

Wang Chong explains the shijie process with the chán (蟬; "cicada") analogy of a nymph molting its exoskeleton, converting into an adult, and leaving behind its exuviae; the adept transforms the body and joins with the spirit into physical immortality, leaving behind some external object in the coffin to prove that the corpse disappeared.

Forke also translates "separation from the body" for lixing (離形; "separate from the form") in another Lunheng chapter, Siwei (死偽; "False Reports About the Dead"). "The souls of the dead are dissolved, and cannot hear any more what men say. This inability to hear what others say is called death. If after their separation from the body they became ghosts, and kept near to men, their connection with the body would already have been severed, and, though people addressed them, it would be impossible for them to again enter the body. and close the eyes, or open the mouth."

=== Xiang'er Daodejing commentary ===
The c. 190–200 CE Xiang'er commentary to the Daodejing, which is central to the Daoist Way of the Celestial Masters religious tradition, uses shi to mean not specifically a "corpse" but generally a "mortal body", either living or dead.

The Xiang'er commentary uses the uncommon terms shisi (尸死; "a corpse dies") and shisheng (尸生; "a corpse lives") to explain the last line in Daodejing Chapter 15, "Through this lack of fullness, they are able to disintegrate and be renewed" [能辭復成]". Bokenkamp interprets shisheng literally, "When the corpse perishes, that is disintegration; when it lives, that is "renewal" [尸死為弊尸生為成]. Only by holding to the Dao without allowing one's will to overflow is one able to transform disintegration into renewal.". Pregadio translates shi as "mortal body", "When the mortal body dies, that is wearing out; when the mortal body lives, that is accomplishment. Only by guarding the Dao without being full and overflowing is one able to transform wearing out into accomplishment."; noting that the passage refers to options given to a living person for their "mortal body", and not to a postmortem renewal for their "corpse".

The commentary to two Daodejing chapters describe an early Daoist understanding of transcendence. The adept tuōsǐ (託死; "feigns/simulates death") and goes to the Tàiyīn (太陰; "Palace of Great Darkness, in the extreme north of the heavens"), where their bodily form is refined, in analogy with alchemically refining base metals, resulting in fusheng (復生; "rebirth" or "second birth") in a body that preserves itself indefinitely. On the other hand, the damned are consigned to dìguān (地官; "Earth Office"), equated with the Diyu (地獄; "earth prisons; purgatories") of later texts. While the Celestial Masters recognized that death was inevitable, they sought longevity not through extended life in this world, but through the avoidance of death, described in terms of "feigned death" and continued existence in the next life.

Daodejing Chapter 33 ends with the baffling phrase "Those who die without perishing are longevous [死而不亡者壽]", which the Xiang'er commentary explains.

When a Daoist's practices are complete, the spirits of the Dao call that person to return. Departing the world through feigned death [避去託死], the person passes through Grand Darkness to be born again and not perish. That is longevity. Commoners have no good merits, and when they die, they belong to the Earth Office. That is to perish.

Compare Seidel's translation, "When he retires from the world, he simulates death and passes over to the realm of the Extreme Yin (Taiyin)."

For the Chapter 16 passage "Their bodies obliterated, they do not perish [沒身不殆]", the commentary says:

Grand Darkness is the palace where those who have accumulated the Dao refine their forms [煉形]. When there is no place for them to stay in the world, the worthy withdraw and, feigning death [避去託死], pass through Grand Darkness to have their images reborn on the other side. This is to be "obliterated without perishing." The profane are unable to accumulate good deeds, so when they die it is truly death. They are taken away in service of the Earth Offices.

Pregadio specifically translates lianxing (煉形) as "refine their [bodily] forms", and says, "Since the release from, or rather of, the mortal body is a necessary step to continue one’s cultivation, the refining process takes place after one who is ready for it has "simulated death". Leaving one's mortal body and refining one's form results, at first, in entering again into a state in which neither form nor matter exist, but only a xiang (象; "image, appearance"). After the adept's bodily form has been refined, the process culminates in his "rebirth"."

The Xiang'er commentary refers to those who lose faith in the Dao as xíngshī (行尸; "mobile corpses"). While received texts of Chapter 7 have "Is it not just because he does not strive for any personal end that all his personal ends are fulfilled?" (tr. Watson, 非以其無私耶故能成其私), the commentary has shi (尸; "corpse") instead of si (私; "self-interest; selfish concerns"), thus, "Because he is without a corpse, he is able to perfect his [mortal] corpse."

The bodies of those who do not know the Dao of long life are but mobile corpses. It is not the Dao that they practice, but merely the way of the corpses. The reason the people of the Dao are able to achieve the longevity of Transcendents is that they do not practice the way of the corpses. They differ from the vulgar and thus are able to perfect their corpses, allowing them to enter the ranks of the Transcendent nobility.

=== Liexian zhuan ===
Beginning with the c. 2nd century CE Liexian Zhuan (Biographies of Exemplary Immortals), numerous hagiographies of Daoist masters directly or indirectly mentioned them transcending death through shijie. While many religious traditions maintain that a believer can ascend to heaven and leave behind a body, Daoist accounts of shijie are notable for denying that a real corpse was left behind.

Several Liexian zhuan hagiographies mention discovering wushi (無屍; "corpseless") coffins, implying that the adept had used shijie, but only one directly refers to shijie (屍解). Kou Xian (寇先) was a legendary fisherman in the Zhou dynasty state of Song who lived on the banks of the Sui River (睢水) for over a century. Duke Jing (景公) of Song (r. 516-451) asked Kou to teach the Dao of longevity, but he refused and the duke had him executed. Several decades later Kou Xian was seen playing a qin lute by the Song city gate, revealing that he evaded death by means of shijie. In later texts, this was interpreted as bingjie (兵解; "escape by execution").

=== Taiqing texts ===
The Taiqing (太清; "Great Clarity") school of Daoism, which preceded the better-known Shangqing School (Highest Clarity), devised new shijie methods using documents to game the spirit-administration system that regulates and enforces human lifespans. In contrast to the Jewish and Christian beliefs that God records the name of every person in the Book of Life and Book of Death, the Chinese believed that the otherworldly death ledger system operated like the imperial system of census family registration, with scribes keeping track of people by their names and registered places of residence.

Two exemplary Taiqing scriptures, both mentioned in the c. 320 Baopuzi below, describe novel shijie procedures: placing a brief listing one's own name and registration data onto one's grandfather's corpse during the funeral, and creating a Daoist fu (符; "supernatural talisman") asserting the cause of death was illness. Both shijie procedures require that the adept and substitute corpse have similar surnames and home districts.

First, the "Taiqing yinye shenqi jing" (太清金液神氣經, Grand Purity Scripture of the Divine Pneumas of Potable Gold') quotes the mythical Yellow Thearch's instructions for preparing a legalistic brief and incantation in order to falsify the life and death ledger system.

"The Sovereign of Humanity (人皇) is familiar with all the registers of the living and the dead (死生之錄). He knows the names of the hundred ghosts and he records the surnames and bynames of the myriad spirits. If you seek a method of extending your years and increasing your longevity, you should prepare a brief (疏) to the Sovereign of Humanity, fully listing your own surname and given name, the year, month, and day of your birth anniversary, and the province, commandery, district, hamlet, village, sector, and earth-god shrine under whose jurisdiction you [are registered as] residing. Then, at the funeral of your grandfather, place this brief in the tomb and incant (祝) as follows: 'Whatever is born must die; allotted life span should accord with the registers. My name was not recorded in the Great Dark Storehouse (大幽藏), yet now I am already set to rest in Haoli. Roaming in the infernal realms, I wail over this in eternal vexation.' Having completed [this incantation], return home. In addition, you must change your surname and byname; these must not be the same as before. Thereupon you will not die in a thousand autumns or a myriad years; for the ledgers have already been fixed, and your name has forever been expunged."

The Numinous Treasure Talisman of the Grand Mystery for Living in Hiding, with graphic components of bìngsǐ (病死; "died of illness"), shi (尸; "corpse"), and gui (鬼; "ghost").

Second, the Lingbao wufu xu (靈寶五符序; "Explanations on the Five Numinous Treasure Talismans") promises earthbound transcendence to those who follow a complex procedure involving a poisonous alchemical elixir, a mystical Daoist talisman, death meditation (cf. Buddhist Maraṇasati), and a shijie simulated corpse. The text gives instructions for compounding and ingesting a mercury-based elixir called shijie yao (尸解藥; "shijie drug"), and writing out in red characters (as for an imperial edict) the Numinous Treasure Talisman of the Grand Mystery for Living in Hiding (靈寶太玄陰生之符), which includes stylized Chinese calligraphy for bingsi (病死; "died of illness"), shi (尸; "corpse"), and gui (鬼; "ghost").

After you have ingested the Medicine for the Release from the Mortal Body for the prescribed number of days, write the talisman [of the Highest Mystery of Living Unseen] in red on white silk, and place it on your belly. On a wu or ji day [in the sexagenary cycle], lie down, your head pointing towards the west, and visualize yourself being dead [思念自作死人]. After quite some time, take off your clothes, leave them where you have lain, and head straight to enter the mountains. When you are far away, change your name. Never return to your hometown. Right after you have left, people will find that where you had lain there is a corpse. But suddenly, after a while, no one will know where your corpse is to be found.

This Taiqing account shows that shijie "release from the mortal body" requires memento mori-like meditation practices and ritual aspects. The adept literally "stages" his or her death, and the "audience" of family members or Daoist companions participate in the "performance". They state that the corpse disappeared and was replaced by another object, such as a sword or staff. This shijie object performs the same function as played by the tishen (替身; "replacement bodies") in early funerary rites. In a ritual sense, the object replaces the deceased, whether the adept's death is real or only "simulated". The same scripture also describes how to make male and female versions of a talisman for "masters of the Dao who wish to perform shijie", which when written with a "spirit-brush" (神筆) on any wood or metal object will immediately transform it into a substitute cadaver that will subsequently "die and depart".

Comparing the two documentary shijie procedures, Campany finds common elements. Both involve a ritual performance (an incantation protesting one's untimely death, meditating on oneself as a corpse). Each uses an administrative document to magically activate an object (one's grandfather's corpse, one's discarded clothing) that creates an illusory substitute corpse. Both mandate a complete name change.

The usual interpretation for a practitioner who performs shijie to change their name is as a simple trick to elude the spirits enforcing the "registers of life and death" for each person's lifespan; the adept changes their name in the belief that the spirit-bureaucrats would be unable to locate them and cause their death. On a deeper level, Pregadio notes the homophonous correspondence between gǎimíng (改名; "changing name") and gǎimìng (改命; "changing destiny"), and says the change of name does not merely intend to cheat the spirits, but is symbolically equivalent to the meditational and ritual act of "taking off one's clothes", that is, discarding one's old persona.

=== Baopuzi ===
The Daoist scholar Ge Hong's c. 320 Baopuzi (Master who Embraces Simplicity) reflects contemporary understanding of shijie during the Jin dynasty (266–420). Two "Inner Chapters" mention shijie, and Ge's appended "Daoist Library" records the Shijie jing (尸解經; "Classic of Shijie"), which is no longer extant.

One passage about the 2nd century BCE fangshi Li Shaojun (李少君, mentioned in the Lunheng above) lists shijie as the lowest category of xian transcendents after tian (heavenly) and di (earthly).

The manuals of the immortals say that masters of the highest category are able to raise themselves high up into the aery void; these are called 'celestial immortals' [天仙; tianxian]. Those of the second category resort to the famous mountains (and forests) and are called 'terrestrial immortals' [地仙; dixian]. As for those of the third category they simply slough off the body after death, and they are called 'corpse-free immortals' [尸解仙; shijiexian].

Based on Han dynasty sources, Ge Hong concludes that Li Shaojun must have been a shijiexian because long after his death from illness, Emperor Wu of Han (r. 141-87) had the coffin opened, and it was found to contain "only a gown and hat". Ge gives three other Eastern Han (25–220 CE) adepts who were shijie transcendents. Xie Yuanyi (謝元一) took Fei Changfang (費長房) away and left "a bamboo effigy to be buried in his place"; Li Yiqi (李意期) and two disciples "died" in Pixian, but when their families opened their coffins they found in each "a bamboo staff with red writing on it".

In another Baopuzi passage, Ge Hong denounced as a charlatan the healer Li Kuan (李寬), who treated illnesses with holy water and amulets and became extremely popular in south China. Ge's personal acquaintances who had witnessed Li's healing rituals, using "very shallow" recipes, unanimously said he was frail, senile, and no different from ordinary old people. After Li Kuan died from a virulent plague, his followers repeatedly claimed that he had metamorphosed into a xian transcendent through "release as a corpse and that his was not a true death". Ge concluded that Li's death proved he was "not the right type of individual" to become a shijiexian.

In the Baopuzi, Ge Hong considered processes like shijie to be perfectly natural.

When gold and jade are inserted into the nine orifices, corpses do not decay. When salt and brine are absorbed into flesh and marrow, dried meats do not spoil. So when men ingest substances which are able to benefit their bodies and lengthen their days, why should it be strange that (some of these) should confer life perpetual?

During Zhou dynasty funerals, amulets of jade, beads or cicadas, were placed in the mouth of the dead.

=== Shenxian zhuan ===
Besides the Baopuzi, Ge Hong also compiled the Shenxian Zhuan (Biographies of Divine Transcendents) that provides more information about shijie than the earlier Liexian Zhuan above. Five hagiographies of xian directly mention shijie and many others allude to it with finding empty coffins, such as Ling Shouguang (靈壽光).

Ling Shouguang was a native of Fufeng. At the age of over seventy obtained a method for [making] "efflorescence of vermilion" pills. These he synthesized and ingested, with the result that his appearance was that of a person in his twenties. By the first year of the [Latter] Han jian'an period [196 CE] he was already two hundred twenty years old. Later, without having shown any signs of illness, he "died" at the home of Hu Gang (胡岡) in Jiangling. Over a hundred days after his funeral and burial, someone saw Ling in Xiaohuang. This person sent a letter to Hu Gang, who, upon receiving the letter, dug up the coffin and looked inside. It was empty except for an old shoe.

Wang Yuan's (王遠) hagiography has a rare description of how the shijie process feels. Wang explains to his pupil Cai Jing (蔡經):

"By birth, you are destined to transcend the world; you will be chosen as a replacement for an office. But your knowledge of the Way is scant; your pneumas are few and you have much flesh. You cannot ascend [directly] in this condition, but must avail yourself of shijie. It's like passing out through a dog's hole [too narrow to permit a person easy passage], that's all." Then Wang declared to Cai the essential teachings, and left him. Soon Cai felt his entire body grow hot as if on fire. He craved cold water to bathe himself in; his entire family brought water and poured it over him, and it was like making steam by pouring water over hot rocks. This went on for three days. Then, once his bones had completely dissolved, he stood up, went into his room, and covered himself with a blanket. Suddenly he had vanished. When his family looked inside the blanket, only his outer skin was left, intact from head to foot, like a cicada shell.

Cai Jing's shijie is not merely escape by means of a simulated corpse that leaves behind the adept's possession (shoe, staff, etc.) but a transformative refinement that dissolves their bones (believed to be the seat of lifespan allotment) and leaves behind only their skin. Thus, Campany suggests translating Cai Jing's case as "'release from one's corpse', where the 'corpse' is all the dross of one's own former, impure body, refined away to leave one with a newly incorruptible body".

The hagiography of Yin Changsheng (陰長生), who supposedly lived over three hundred years, estimates the frequency of adepts achieving shijie. "In upper antiquity, there were many transcendents, so many that they cannot all be accounted for. But since the rise of the Han, only forty-five persons have attained transcendence—forty-six counting myself. Twenty of them did so via 'escape by means of a simulated corpse,' the rest all ascended to Heaven in broad daylight."

Campany summarizes five common features of shijie stories in the Shenxian zhuan and other early hagiographies.

1. Some adepts, when about to perform shijie, pretend to be ill and make a public announcement to that effect. This can now be seen as motivated by the need to make the "death" more believable—something necessary only if the death is being staged with intent to deceive.
2. When, after his feigned death, the adept is sighted alive, it is always at a distant place.
3. When, after such a sighting, the coffin is opened and found devoid of a corpse, some other object is always present instead—a talisman, a sword, a piece of clothing, or an entire outfit in the shape of a body. These objects are the substrata of the ritually and meditationally produced, illusory corpse that replaced the adept's own body long enough for him to escape. They are, in fact, so many shi 尸—not in the sense of actual corpses but in the sense of ritual impersonator or simulacrum of the dead in the mortuary and commemorative rites.
4. If, in the narrative, the adept ever returns home (and often he does not), he does so only after considerable time has passed—usually more than a generation.
5. In some cases, the adept is said to have changed his names after performing shijie. The ubiquity of sobriquets rather than proper names for the subjects of hagiographies is probably also due to the name-changing strategy for eluding detection by spirits.

However, not every shijie narrative in the Shenxian zhuan conforms to these patterns. When Zuo Ci and Guo Pu were condemned to execution, they escaped through bingjie (兵解; "martial liberation") and simultaneously eluded the agents of both the imperial and the spirit world bureaucracies.

=== Zhen'gao ===
shijie is frequently mentioned in the 499 Zhen'gao (Declarations of the Perfected), which is Tao Hongjing's collection of materials from the "Shangqing revelations" that were allegedly given to the mystic Yang Xi (330-c. 386) by a group of Daoist Perfected Ones from 364 to 370.

Several revelations concern shijie methods and the destinies of Yang Xi and his aristocratic collaborators, Xu Mi (許謐, 303–376) and his son Xu Hui (許翽, 341-c. 370). Perfected Consort An (安妃) suggests jianjie (劍解; "escape by means of a sword; here written 解劍; jiejian") to her spirit-fiancé Yang Xi, "My lord, if you can't abide the smoke from windblown flames and wish to embrace Perfected form in a secluded wood, then could you just seek the Way of escape by means of the sword and perform the technique of announcing [your own] end? If you finish yourself off, doing it openly or in secret and leaving your trace [corpse-simulacrum] concealed or in plain view are matters to be separately arranged at the last moment. It's all up to you, discerning lord!"

A Zhen'gao revelation from Mao Gu (茅固), one of the Three Lords Mao, discloses to Xu Mi that his missing elder brother Xu Mai (許邁, 300–348), had paired with a Perfected partner, retreated into the mountains, and escaped from the world by means of a "simulated corpse". Another context says Xu Mai studied under his teacher Wang Shilong (王世龍), and "received the Way of loosening constraints [解束之衜; jieshu zhi dao], practiced the method of walking backward, consumed jade fluid, and had audience at Brain-Essence [Palace]". This "Way of loosening constraints" may refer to the shijie variety called jiedai (解帯; "escape leaving one's waistband behind"). Others revelations tell Xu Hui that he will perform a "nocturnal escape", which apparently means staging death under cover of night, without using a simulacrum like a sword or staff, and tell Xu Mi that he is too preoccupied with worldly affairs to escape immediately.

Zhen'gao passages provide a general outline of a complicated shijie process, which goes through several stages, usually over a span of many years. First, the practitioner must become "suitably detached" from worldly affairs. Second, one must be in the correct frame of mind that views life and death as opposite banks of the same river—"both are equal and essential". Third, after one escapes, the hun cloud-souls go to Grand Yin, the po earth-souls enter the earth, and the Four Numina and Five Male Ones preserve the body's seminal essence and five viscera. Fourth, once the cloud-souls arrive at Grand Yin (a place far in the north), they undergo further refinement, in a process like that which takes place in the alchemist's sealed crucible. Finally, all those who are fit for the process inevitably wake up as Perfected. "Only then can the practitioner truly understand the wondrousness of the spirit immortals' "dying but not perishing" and the profundity of the principles governing life and death".

Zhao Cui (d. 622 BCE) was a legendary Daoist transcendent who assisted Duke Wen of Jin (r. 636-628), and the Zhen'gao records that five to six years after he died, "a man travelling through the mountains one evening spotted this corpse inside a rock chamber. The flesh had rotted, but the bones remained. He also saw that the five viscera in the abdomen were still alive as before. The [bodily] fluids and blood were wrapped in bundles therein; a purple placenta was woven on the outside."

Many Zhen'gao passages mention alchemical drugs as a means to achieving shijie "release from the corpse". Chinese alchemists were aware that the metallic compounds produced in their furnaces were highly poisonous, but they believed that the practitioner would suffer only an apparent death while in fact passing into the heavens without dying. One context lists historical figures who achieved shijie by consuming the powerful alchemical Elixir of Langgan Efflorescence, which was compounded from toxic heavy metals.

Those who feigned construction of a tomb after swallowing Efflorescence of Langgan are Yan Menzi [衍門子], Gao Qiuzi [髙丘子], and Master Hongyai [洪涯先生]. The residents of the three counties (in which their graves are found) all call them vacant tumuli of the dead of highest antiquity. They are unaware, though, that on one occasion Gao Qiuzi entered Mount Liujing through liberation by means of a corpse. He afterwards consumed a powder of Liquefied Gold [金液], then ingested Efflorescence of Langgan at Zhongshan and feigned the appearance of still another death, whereupon he at last entered Xuanzhou [玄州; "dark region", netherworld"].

These practitioners notably do not ascend into the Shangqing heavens but live among the terrestrial paradises.

The Shangqing School founder, Wei Huacun, who supposedly performed shijie herself, describes some others who performed it.

Finding the Way and leaving the world is done either visibly or in secret. Using the body to leave a trace behind is the secret [approach to] the Way. Some have taken two swigs of rose-gem essence and knocked on their coffins, or consumed a speck of it once and had their corpses rot. Sire Deerskin swallowed jade blossoms and the maggots streamed out his door; Youngest Son Qiu gulped the gold fluid and the stench was smelled a hundred li away. The Yellow Thearch, who fired the nine cauldrons [elixir] on Mount Jing, still has a tomb at Qiao Peak; Sima Jizhu, who consumed mica powder to make a covert ascent, still [left his] head and feet in different places. Mo Di gulped rainbow elixir to throw himself into a river; Young Ning consumed stone brains and rushed into a fire. Wu Guang cut leeks to enter Qingling Pool; Bocheng Zigao absorbed pneumas, and his guts rotted three times. People like these are beyond count. Isn't the Way subtle? In finding it, the traces of one's inclinations and aversions are never constant."

Sima Jizhu (司馬季主) was a diviner for Han Emperor Wen (r. 180–157 BCE); "head and feet in different places" (頭足異凥; tóuzúyìchù) is a fixed expression for beheaded persons. The Zhen'gao translator Thomas E. Smith describes Wei Huacun as employing "graveyard humor", such as the name for mica powder, yunsan (云散; 'disperse like clouds') with san (散; "scatter; vanish; (TCM) powdered medicine"), which is a pun for "vanishing powder".

The Shangqing classic Jianjing (劍巠; "Sword Scripture") compares several shijie alchemical preparations and says the lingwan (靈丸; "Numinous Bolus") elixir is the only one that permits the adept to return home without changing his or her name. The Zhen'gao Appendix to the Jianjing describes the range of different techniques.

Those who manage to escape by means of the corpse through the use of other medicines and are not transformed by means of the Numinous Bolus may not, in any case, return to their hometowns, for the Three Offices would detain them. There are those who die and revive. There are those who get beheaded, only to emerge [again] from one side. There are those whose corpses disappear before encoffinment. There are those whose human forms remain but whose bones are not recovered, those whose clothes remain but whose forms disappear, and those whose hair falls out but whose forms are lost. Departing in broad daylight is called a superior escape by corpse, and departing at midnight is called an inferior escape by corpse.

This passage distinguishes two grades of shijie by the time of day when the adept leaves the world, superior bairi (白日; "daytime; broad daylight") and inferior yeban (夜半; "midnight"). The term bairi is usually translated as "in broad daylight" but more precisely means "midday; noon", in contrast to shijie proper at midnight. Hagiographies of Daoist immortals provide many examples of ascension to Heaven occurring exactly at midday, often expressed with the stock phrase bairi shengtian (白日昇天; "ascending to Heaven in broad daylight"). These two ways of deliverance are distinguished by opposite but corresponding yinyang features: ascent and descent, midday and midnight, light and darkness, sun and moon. On one hand, ascent to Heaven is the way of non-return to the world, a spiritual journey ascending from one empyrean to the next. On the other, descent to Great Darkness is the way of return, one obtains a "second birth" and eventually comes back to the world.

The reason for this inferior status of an adept who performs shijie is that despite their having attained an advanced spiritual state, it is insufficient for them to "ascend to heaven in broad daylight", and they need to undergo a transformational "refining the bodily form". As long as the adept continues dwelling in their physical body, they are able to focus upon creating their perfected body.

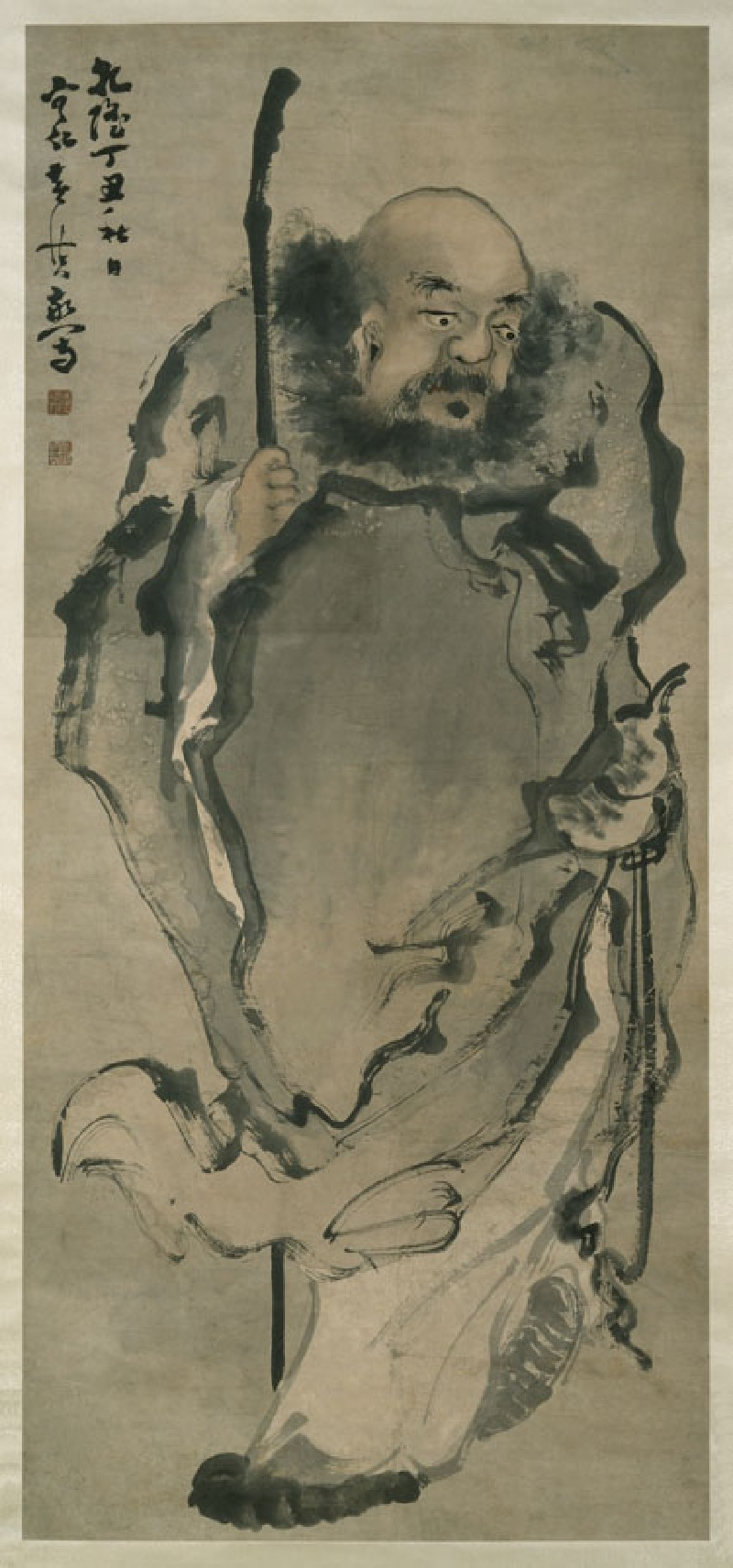
Huang Shen's painting of Li Tieguai, 1757

Logically, a question about shijie occurs: "If "release from the corpse" serves to leave one's ordinary body and to generate a "perfected body", why would an adept ever return to their mortal body from which they wanted to be liberated?" The famed legend of Li Tieguai ("Iron-Crutch Li"), one of the Eight Immortals in the Daoist pantheon, illustrates that the function of this "recovered" body is to provide a means to cultivate the "perfected" body. Once when Li Tieguai was in deep meditation, his spirit left his body and was roaming in the heavens, but his disciples mistakenly thought that he had died and cremated what they believed was his corpse. When his spirit returned, Li realized that since his original body was no longer available, he had to enter the only available corpse, that of a lame beggar who had recently starved to death. Thus, what is to be "perfected" through shijie is not the physical form, Iron-Crutch only needed a body in order to continue his Daoist practices. "Even in this uncommon case of a forced "release from the mortal body", the focus of the practice is the perfected body."

The Zhen'gao's Examination of the Corpse section is widely quoted. It gives wide-ranging criteria for verifying shijie "escape by an apparent corpse", reflecting the wide variety of escape methods and contingent factors (e.g., choosing to escape openly or secretly) that would tend to leave different signs on the corpse.

When a person dies, you must look at the body. If it is like that of a living person, it is in all instances a case of escape by corpse. If you see that the feet are not blue and the skin is not wrinkled, it is also a case of escape by corpse. If the light of the eyes is undimmed and no different from that of a living person, it is also a case of escape by corpse. If all the head hair has fallen out but the body and bones are missing, it is in all instances a case of escape by corpse. If an [apparent] escape by corpse occurs in broad daylight, then even though [the person] is an immortal it is not an instance of escape by corpse.

Most of these criteria would allow a deceased master's disciples to announce that he or she had successfully achieved shijie "escape by corpse", except the one "broad daylight" criterion for not attaining shijie that actually indicates the highest form of transcendence, directly rising to heaven. Declaring successful shijie is easy, "none of the criteria are negative indicators of a failed quest".

=== Daojiaoyishu ===
Even though the word shijie (尸解) was in use during the 1st century CE, before Buddhism had any influence in China, the meaning was probably later influenced by jiětuō (解脫)—the Chinese Buddhist translation of moksha (liberation, emancipation, release). Cross-borrowings between Buddhism and Daoism were so pervasive that many narratives about Buddhist monks include supposedly distinctive Daoist practices such as shijie (liberation from the corpse) and bigu (grain avoidance). For instance, the 648 Book of Jin records that the Buddhist monk Shan Daokai (單衜開), a contemporary of the Central Asian missionary Fotudeng (c. 232–348 CE), "achieved a cicada-like metamorphosis by ingesting pills".

The c. 700 Buddhist-influenced text 'Daojiaoyishu (衜敎義樞) describes shijie as the second of three types of bianhua transformations. The first is adepts who "ascend to Heaven in broad daylight" (白日昇天; bairi shengtian), merge with the divine, and roam together with the gods, which means that "one's entire person ascends to Heaven".

The second [type of transformation] is "release from the corpse" (shijie). Some replace their corpse with a sword or a bamboo staff; all of a sudden, they rise up and go, and abruptly they are no longer there. Some leave behind their skin. Some receive a funeral and are buried, but then if their coffin is opened there is only a staff or a shoe. Some roam to the five sacred peaks, while some can rise to Heaven. In the Southern Palace (Nangong) there is the Court of Flowing Fire (liuhuo zhi ting); in the Golden Gate (Jinmen) there is the Water of Smelting Refinement (yelian zhi shui). All those who inwardly ascend to Heaven while they are alive must first go to the Court of Fire (huoting) in order to refine their form and spirit, while those who rise to heaven after their death must first go the Courtly Pond (tingchi) in order to refine their celestial soul(s) (hun) and body frame. All this accords with the results of their practice (gongye).

The third is "transfer by extinction" (烕度; miedu; "the Chinese Buddhist name for "Nirvana"), "The mortal form (shixing) does not become ashes, as if the corpse is guarded by the Great One (Taiyi) itself. Sometimes, after years, the corpse reverts to be a human being." The shijie implements such as a sword or shoe perform a function similar to the tishen (替身; "replacement bodies") used in some Daoist rites to represent the adept's negative and "unrefined" aspects, worldly bonds which made it impossible for one to achieve a higher form of liberation in life.

== Interpretations ==
The term shijie "corpse deliverance" has "baffled scholars because the ideas and practices behind it have remained quite murky", perhaps owing to intentional secrecy among Daoist initiates. Academics cannot even decide how to translate the term. "Should we interpret it as deliverance of a person from the mortal coil of his corpse, as deliverance of a person's body from death and putrefaction, or as deliverance by means of a corpse? While arguments in favor of each of these interpretations have been offered, scholars essentially agree that "corpse deliverance" implies a freedom gained after either what really was or what appeared to be physical death."

=== Cicada metaphor ===
The oldest explanation of shijie is the cicada metamorphosis metaphor, which later became a standard Chinese literary trope, both of which first appeared in Wang Chong's 1st-century Lunheng. There are multiple parallels between a shijie practitioner leaving behind their (sometimes apparent) corpse and transforming into a xian transcendent and a cicada nymph moulting its exoskeleton, emerging as an adult, and leaving behind an exuvia.

The Shenxian zhuan above uses the term chántuì (蟬蛻), which means both "cicada slough" (used in Traditional Chinese medicine) and "free/extricate oneself", to describe Cai Jing after his body had melted away for three days, "only his outer skin was left, intact from head to foot, like a cicada shell". Zhang Junfang's c. 1029 Yunji Qiqian (Seven Bamboo Tablets of the Cloudy Satchel) Daoist encyclopedia describes jianjie transcendence as chánhuà (蟬化; "cicada transformation"), "When men use a precious sword for the deliverance of the body, this is the highest example of metamorphic transformations".

Joseph Needham and Lu Gwei-djen say that Daoist alchemists believed immortality elixirs could generate "a new physical but immortal self, embodying the whole personality, which could leave the adept's corpse like a butterfly emerging from a chrysalis, and go off to dwell among the other immortals". Two possible results of shijie "liberation from the corpse" were either an empty coffin if the physical body had fully etherealized, or the changeless perpetuation of an adept's light body, never showing any signs of post-mortem decomposition.

=== Body preservation ===
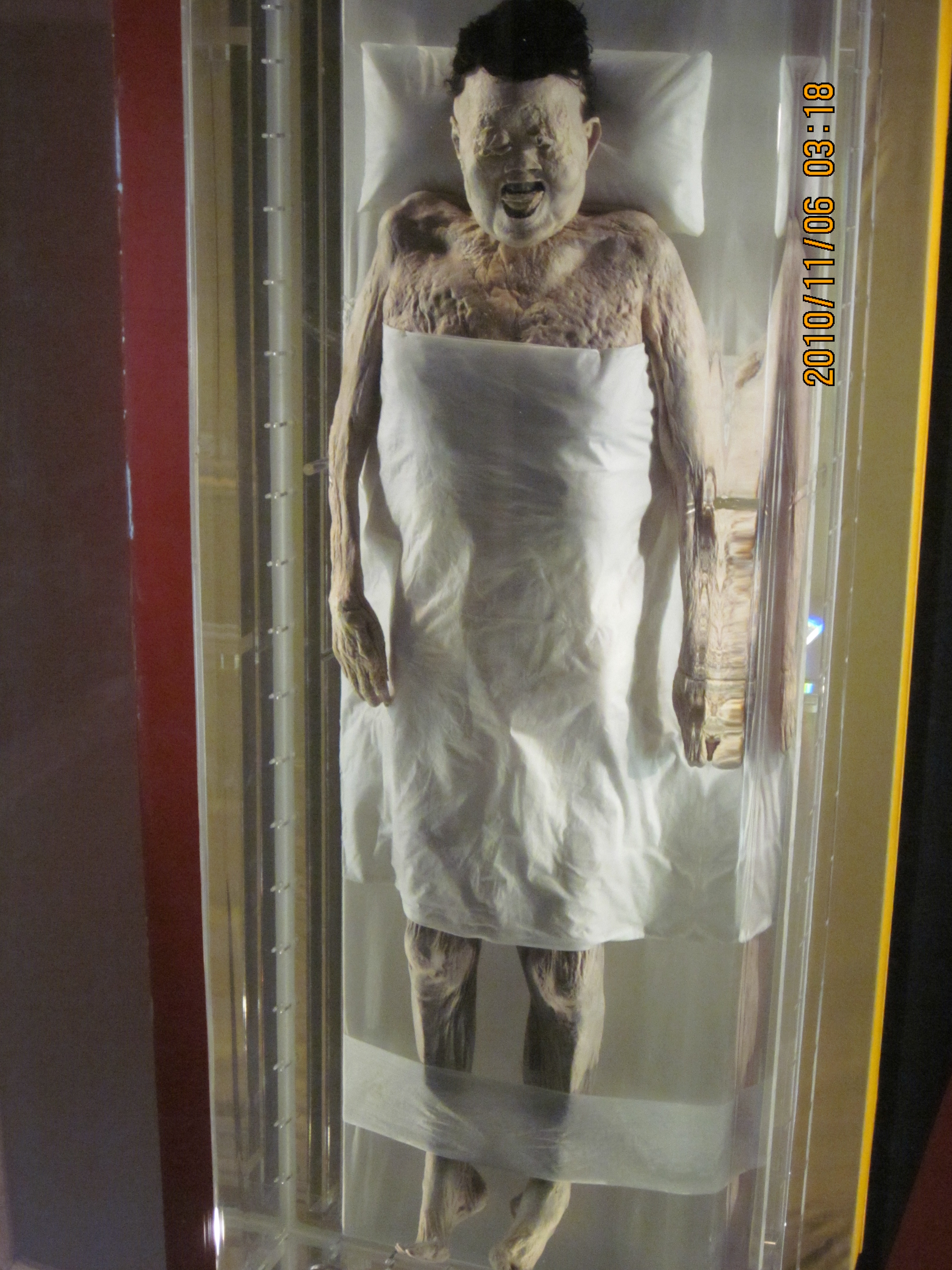
The perfectly preserved body of Xin Zhui (d. 163 BCE)

Needham and Lu also interpret that the remarkably well-preserved body of Xin Zhui or Lady Dai (d. 163 BCE), discovered in 1972 among Mawangdui tombs, showed that early Chinese mortuary specialists, whom they presume were Daoists, had sufficiently advanced chemical knowledge and skill to achieve an almost perpetual conservation, which suggests "for the first time all that [shijie] may have implied". Furthermore, they say this adds another dimension to the Daoist doctrine of physical immortality and suggests that traditional stories about incorruptible corpses were possibly based on fact. Lady Dai's body demonstrates that the Daoist conception of shijiexian "corpse-free immortals, whose bodies would remain century after century like those of persons still living, was not entirely imaginary.

=== Ritual suicide ===
Michel Strickmann convincingly proposed that the adept's "corpse" in shijie techniques was not always a temporary stand-in but in certain cases could be the cadaver of someone who achieved xian transcendence by means of ritual suicide through Chinese alchemical elixir poisoning. For a Daoist religious believer, suicide could sometimes be an acceptable way to escape during periods of social or political trouble. For example, Ge Xuan (164–244) resorted to shijie to flee from the oppression of Emperor Wu of Jin.

In response, Isabelle Robinet contended that shijie "liberation from the body" was not a ritual suicide—an "interpretation that has grown up without any supporting evidence"—but instead a procedure of salvation after death. When a practitioner dies before completing spiritual purification, a kind of "partial death" takes place, with an afterlife in an intermediate realm while it awaits a more complete purification and final deliverance.

Ursula-Angelika Cedzich concurs with Strickmann's ritual suicide hypothesis. In one of the best-documented cases, Tao Hongjing's disciple Zhou Ziliang (周子良, 497–516) received visions from Perfected Ones who guaranteed him transcendence into Shangqing heavens, and gave instructions how to compound a deadly potion of mushrooms and cinnabar, with which he committed suicide.

=== Resurrection ===
Another interpretation of shijie centers around similarities with resurrection as the concept of coming back to life after death.

Donald Harper studied documents found in Late Warring States tombs, including an official report that recounts a spectacular resurrection story. A man named Dan (丹, cinnabar), who was employed by a general in the Wei army, committed suicide in 300 BCE because he had murdered a man. After Dan's burial, however, the general filed an official bureaucratic complaint with the netherworld administration claiming that he had not yet been "fated" to die, and they subsequently released Dan from the grave and returned him to the world of the living in 297 BCE. However, it took several years after his resurrection before Dan could hear or eat food again, and "his four limbs were useless". Harper suggests that the concept of shijie began around the 1st century CE from a synthesis of ancient beliefs about resurrecting the dead and the Daoist notion of xian transcendence/immortality, "shijie was a special form of resurrection with elements that distinguished it from an already existing belief in resurrection in popular religion".

Julian Pas says that when Daoism adopted the shijie procedure, properly translated here not as "liberation from the body" but as "liberation through the body", it changed the focus from relying on official documents to revive a dead person to relying on self-cultivation to metamorphize into a xian transcendent. In addition, shijie has some parallels with Christian resurrection of the dead in which the deceased body is reunited with the soul. Describing the resurrection of Jesus, the Bible says his tomb was found empty, except for some grave clothes—which is reminiscent of Daoist shijie cases when the master's coffin is found empty except for some article of clothing left behind.

=== Escaping difficulties ===
In some cases, a Daoist adept carrying out shijie "escape by means of a corpse" was not attempting miraculous transcendence but was simply absconding from difficult demands, such as when Emperor Wu of Jin indefinitely detained Ge Xuan, he told his disciple, "I do not have the leisure to prepare the great drug [of immortality]. Now I will perform shijie."

The Book of the Later Han gives several examples. Xu Yang (許楊) was an expert in Chinese numerology, but when the usurper Wang Mang conscripted him into the new government, Xu changed his name and became a famed healer in a distant province, and returned home only after the Han army had executed Wang Mang in 23 CE. For similar reasons, Feng Liang (馮良) supposedly killed his horse, smashed his carriage, tore his clothes to pieces, and disappeared. Everyone believed that wild animals had killed him, and his family buried the remains found at the site—but Feng returned more than ten years later.

Narratives involving this expedient type of shijie have common themes of name change and identity creation. This represents "a momentous abstention from the family lineage system that formed the spine of Chinese society". The elaborate shijie process given above in the Lingbao wufu xu says, "After the adept has reached a safe place, they begin a new life under a pseudonym, but can never return home (where they might be recognized)." Finally, even the Shangqing patriarch Tao Hongjing himself, after years of unsuccessful alchemical experiments with immortality elixirs for Emperor Wu of Liang (r. 502–549), desperately attempted to flee his imperial patron in 508 by changing his name to Wang Zheng (王整) and pretending to be an ordinary soldier.

== See also ==
- Xian (Taoism)
- Zombie-Loan manga has an episode titled Shikai no Hō (尸解の㳒, The Corpse Release Spell)

== Sources ==
- Benn, James A. (2003). "[Review of] To Live as Long as Heaven and Earth: A Translation and Study of Ge Hong's Traditions of Divine Transcendents by Robert Ford Campany". Journal of the Royal Asiatic Society. 13 (1): 138–140.
- Bokenkamp, Stephen R. (1997). Early Daoist Scriptures. University of California Press.
- Campany, Robert F. (1996). Strange Writing: Anomaly Accounts in Early Medieval China. State University of New York Press.
- Campany, Robert F. (2002). To Live as Long as Heaven and Earth: A Translation and Study of Ge Hong's Traditions of Divine Transcendents. University of California Press.
- Campany, Robert F. (2009). Making Transcendents: Ascetics and Social Memory in Early Medieval China. University of Hawaii Press.
- Carr, Michael (2007). "The Shi 'Corpse/Personator' Ceremony in Early China". In Marcel Kuijsten (ed.). Reflections on the Dawn of Consciousness: Julian Jaynes's Bicameral Mind Theory Revisited. Julian Jaynes Society. pp. 343–416.
- Cedzich, Ursula-Angelika (1993). "Ghosts and Demons, Law and Order: Grave Quelling Texts and Early Taoist Liturgy". Taoist Resources. 4 (2): 23–35.
- Cedzich, Ursula-Angelika (2001). "Corpse Deliverance, Substitute Bodies, Name Change, and Feigned Death: Aspects of Metamorphosis and Immortality in Early Medieval China". Journal of Chinese Religions. 29 (1): 1–68. doi:10.1179/073776901804774578.
- Forke, Alfred (tr.) (1907). Lun-hêng, Part 1, Philosophical Essays of Wang Ch'ung. Translated by Forke, Alfred. Harrassowitz. 1907.
- Harper, Donald (1994). "Resurrection in Warring States Popular Religion". Taoist Resources. 5 (2): 13–28.
- Harper, Donald (1998). Early Chinese Medical Literature: The Mawangdui Medical Manuscripts. Kegan Paul.
- Kirkland, Russell (2008). "Shijie 尸解 "'release by means of a corpse'; mortuary liberation". In Fabrizio Pregadio (ed.). The Encyclopedia of Taoism. Routledge. pp. 896–897.
- Kohn, Livia (1993). The Taoist Experience: An Anthology. State University of New York Press Press.
- Kroll, Paul K. (2017). A Student's Dictionary of Classical and Medieval Chinese (rev. ed.). Brill.
- Li, Shuhuan 李叔還 (1971). Daojiao yaoyi wenda jicheng 衜敎要義問荅集成 [Essential Catechism of Daoism]. Kaohsiung.
- Mair, Victor H. (tr.) (1990). Tao Te Ching: The Classic Book of Integrity and the Way. Translated by Mair, Victor H. Bantam Books. 1990.
- Mair, Victor H. (tr.) (1994). Wandering on the Way, Early Taoist Tales and Parables of Chuang Tzu. Translated by Mair, Victor H. Bantam. 1994. ISBN 0-553-37406-0.
- Needham, Joseph; Wang Ling (1954). Science and Civilisation in China, Volume 1, Introductory Orientations. Cambridge University Press. ISBN 9780521057998.
- Needham, Joseph; Wang Ling (1956). Science and Civilisation in China: Volume 2, History of Scientific Thought. Cambridge University Press.
- Needham, Joseph; Lu Gwei-djen (1974). Science and Civilisation in China, Volume 5 Chemistry and Chemical Technology Part 2: Spagyrical Discovery and Inventions: Magisteries of Gold and Immortality. Cambridge University Press.
- Needham, Joseph; Ho Ping-Yu; Lu Gwei-djen (1976). Science and Civilisation in China, Volume 5 Chemistry and Chemical Technology, Part 3: Spagyrical Discovery and Invention: Historical Survey, from Cinnabar Elixirs to Synthetic Insulin. Cambridge University Press.
- Pas, Julian; Man Kam Leung (1998). Historical Dictionary of Taoism. Scarecrow Press. pp. 57–60.
- Pregadio, Fabrizio (2004). "The Notion of 'Form' and the Ways of Liberation in Daoism". Cahiers d'Extrême-Asie. 14: 95–130. 117–127. doi:10.3406/asie.2004.1202.
- Pregadio, Fabrizio (2018). "Which is the Daoist Immortal Body?". Micrologus. 26. SISMEL Edizioni del Galluzzo.
- Robinet, Isabelle (1979). "Metamorphosis and Deliverance from the Corpse in Taoism". History of Religions. 19 (1): 37–70. doi:10.1086/462835.
- Robinet, Isabelle (1993). Taoist Meditation: The Mao-shan Tradition of Great Purity. Translated by Julian F. Pas; Norman J. Girardot. State University of New York Press.
- Robinet, Isabelle (1997). Taoism: Growth of a Religion. Translated by Phyllis Brooks. Stanford University Press.
- Seidel, Anna (1987). "Post-Mortem Immortality, or the Taoist Resurrection of the Body". In S. Shaked; et al. (eds.). Gilgul: Essays on Transformation, Revolution and Permanence in the History of Religions. Brill. pp. 223–237.
- Smith, Thomas E. (2013). Declarations of the Perfected: Part One: Setting Scripts and Images into Motion. Three Pines Press. ISBN 9781387209231.
- Strickmann, Michel (1979). "On the Alchemy of Tao Hung-ching". In Holmes Welch; Anna K. Seidel (eds.). Facets of Taoism: Essays in Chinese Religion. Yale University Press. pp. 123–192.
- Wallace, Leslie V. (2011). "Betwixt and Between: Depictions of Immortals (Xian) in Eastern Han Tomb Reliefs". Ars Orientalis. 41: 73–101.
- Ware, James R. (tr.) (1966). Alchemy, Medicine and Religion in the China of A.D. 320: The Nei Pien of Ko Hung. Translated by Ware, James R. Dover. 1966.
- Yü, Ying-shih (1965). "Life and Immortality in The Mind of Han China". Harvard Journal of Asiatic Studies. 25: 80–122. doi:10.2307/2718339. JSTOR 2718339.
