= Michael Beddow =

British scholar of German literature

- Born: 3 September 1947; United Kingdom
- Died: 2 September 2019 (aged 71)
- Occupation: British scholar of German literature

Michael Beddow (3 September 1947 – 2 September 2019) was a British scholar of German literature, who was also a renowned expert in the application of XML technologies to web representations of literary corpora, and who was deeply involved with the work of the Text Encoding Initiative (TEI).

== Academic career ==
Beddow studied at St John's College, Cambridge, earning a Double First in the Modern and Medieval Languages Tripos in 1969. After taking a Postgraduate Certificate in Education (PGCE) he became a Research Fellow at Trinity Hall, Cambridge. His subsequent research for his PhD on Thomas Mann and the Traditions of the Picaresque Novel and the Bildungsroman included a year at the University of Tübingen as Foundation Scholar of the King Edward VII British-German Foundation.

Beddow held lecturing posts at Cambridge and King's College London before being appointed Professor of German Language and Literature at the University of Leeds in 1986. He was an international authority on Goethe, Thomas Mann, Christa Wolf and the impact of modernity on German literature. He took early retirement from Leeds in 1998 to pursue a career in IT consultancy.

== IT career ==
Until his death in September 2019, Beddow was for two decades the architect and maintainer of the Digital Dictionary of Buddhism, the primary online scholarly reference resource for Buddhist Studies. and the Internet version of the Anglo-Norman Dictionary.

== Works ==
- Ritchie Robertson, ed. (2002). "The Magic Mountain". The Cambridge companion to Thomas Mann. Cambridge University Press. ISBN 978-0-521-65370-1.
- Thomas Mann, Doctor Faustus. Cambridge University Press. 1994. ISBN 978-0-521-37592-4.
- Goethe, Faust I, Grant & Cutler, 1986, ISBN 978-0-7293-0261-6
- The fiction of humanity: studies in the Bildungsroman from Wieland to Thomas Mann, Cambridge University Press, 1982, ISBN 978-0-521-24533-3
