= Anglo-Norman Dictionary =

Language dictionary, published 1977–1992

The Anglo-Norman Dictionary (AND) is a dictionary of the Anglo-Norman language as attested from the British Isles (England, Wales, Scotland and Ireland) between 1066 (the Norman Conquest) and the end of the fifteenth century. The first edition was first proposed in 1945 and published in seven volumes between 1977 and 1992. The second edition is online-only and was published in the early twenty-first century and is still incomplete as of 2021.

Anglo-Norman Dictionary editorial office, Aberystwyth University

In 2011 the dictionary was awarded the Prix Honoré Chavée by the Académie des Inscriptions et Belles-Lettres in France.

== First, second and on-line editions ==
The Anglo-Norman dictionary project started in the 1940s and the First Edition was published in fascicles between 1977 and 1992 by the Modern Humanities Research Association (MHRA). A greatly expanded Second Edition was begun in the mid 1990s, with A-E published in two volumes in 2005.

In 2001 a digital version of the dictionary was created by Michael Beddow, combining the material of A-E the Second edition with that of F-Z in the First Edition. The AND site, originally under the name of Anglo-Norman Hub, provides full and free access to the dictionary as well as to some additional resources for the study of Anglo-Norman language and literature. It was opened to the public in July 2007.

Funded by several Arts and Humanities Research Council (AHRC) grants since 2003, the revision (Second Edition) of the Anglo-Norman Dictionary remains a continuing project, gradually replacing online sections of the alphabet with updated versions. The results are published by Aberystwyth University in yearly or biyearly sections of one letter of the alphabet at the time. Most recently, the revised versions of S and Z were published (2021), and the editorial team is working towards the completion of the Second Edition by 2025.

The nature and scope of the Second Edition has expanded over the years, with a much greater level of detail in individual entries and an increasing number of Anglo-Norman source texts now included. In a major shift, the Anglo-Norman Dictionary (originally created as a semantic dictionary only) became a historical dictionary in 2017-21, through a process of adding dates to all illustrative citations and presenting them in chronological order, in combination with an identification of the earliest attestation of every word and/or sense.

== See also ==
- Anglo-Norman language
- Anglo-Norman literature
- Anglo-Norman Text Society
