= Bianhua =

Taoist concept of transformation

Chinese name
- Traditional Chinese: 變化
- Simplified Chinese: 变化
- Literal meaning: transformation; metamorphosis
Transcriptions
Standard Mandarin
- Hanyu Pinyin: biànhuà
- Wade–Giles: pien-hua
- IPA: pianxua
Wu
- Romanization: pi ho
Hakka
- Romanization: pien-fa
Yue: Cantonese
- Jyutping: bin3 faa3
Middle Chinese
- Middle Chinese: pjenxwae
Old Chinese
- Baxter–Sagart (2014): pron-sqʷʰˤ

Vietnamese name
- Vietnamese alphabet: biến hóa

Korean name
- Hangul: 변화
Transcriptions
- Revised Romanization: byeonhwa
- McCune–Reischauer: pyŏnhwa

Japanese name
- Kanji: 変化
- Hiragana: へんか
Transcriptions
- Revised Hepburn: henka

Biànhuà, meaning 'transformation' or 'metamorphosis', was a keyword developed in both Daoism and Chinese Buddhism. Daoists used biànhuà to describe things transforming from one type to another, such as from a caterpillar to a butterfly. Buddhist translators used biànhuà for Sanskrit nirmāṇa 'manifest through transformations', such as the nirmāṇa-kaya 'transformation body' of a Buddha's reincarnations.

== Terminology ==
In the morphology of the Chinese language, Chinese: 變化; pinyin: biànhuà; trans. "change, esp. in form or character', 'variation', 'transformation', 'metamorphosis', 'reincarnation" is categorized as a "synonymic compound" whose parts are synonyms, e.g., 艱難; jiannan; "difficult; hard"; compounds 艱; jian; "difficult; arduous" and 難; nan; "difficult; troublesome".

For the Old Chinese etymologies, Axel Schuessler has 變; biàn < *prans "to change" cognate with Tai plian "to change" and perhaps Written Tibetan sprul-ba or ˈpʰrul-ba "juggle; appear; change; transform"; and huà < hŋrôih 化; "to transform' change, e.g., from a fish into a bird; people through education; raw food through cooking", cognate with e < *ŋôi 吪; "to move; act; change", with possible Tibeto-Burman etymological links to Kinnauri skwal "to change" or Khaling kʰwaal "to shift; move". Walter Simon proposed the Sino-Tibetan etymological link between Chinese biàn "change; transform" and Tibetan language sprul "juggle; perform tricks of illusion; change", and noted that the Chinese and Tibetan Buddhists chose these words to translate the Sanskrit technical vocabulary meaning "change; illusory transformation", such as, both sprul-sku and 變化身; bianhuashen translate nirmāṇa-kaya "transformation body".

In Modern Standard Chinese usage, 变; 變; biàn means "change; become, change into; transform; perform (magic/etc.)"; and 化; huà means "change, transform, convert; melt; dissolve, thaw; digest, remove; burn up, incinerate; disguise; [religion] die, pass away". Some common chengyu; "four-character idioms" based upon biànhuà are: 變化多端; biànhuàduōduān; "changeable" (with "many kinds"), 變化莫測; biànhuàmòcè; "changeable; unpredictable" (with "unmeasurable"), 變化無常; biànhuàwúcháng; "constantly changing; unending changes" (with "changeable"), and 千變萬化; qiānbiànwànhuà; "ever-changing (esp. tides and fortunes)" (with "1000" and "10,000").

The modern Chinese character 變 for biàn is classified as a radical-phonetic graph, combining the semantically significant "strike" radical 攴 or 攵 at the bottom with the phonetic indicator luan 䜌 (from 言 "words" between two 糸 "silk threads") at the top. Bian was first recorded on Zhou dynasty bronze script; "The meaning of the drawing is uncertain, but it contains two hanks of silk, and Xu Shen [in his ca. 100 CE Shuowen Jiezi] said that it meant 'to bring into order', as in spinning or reeling". The modern character 化 for huà is classified as a compound-ideograph, combining the "person" radical 亻 or 人 on the left and "spoon" radical 匕 on the right. However, in earlier bronze script and oracle script forms of 化, the right side was originally a 人 "person" upside-down, depicting "a person who flips, changes".

Chinese has a rich lexicon of words meaning "change", including biàn, huà, 反; fǎn; "turn over; return; counter; oppose", 還; huán; "go/come back; give back; return; repay", 易; yì; "change" (as in the Yìjīng), and 移; yí; "shift; adapt; modify; adjust". There are so many that, as Joseph Needham notes, "the exact meaning of which are sometimes difficult to differentiate".

Semantically distinguishing between biàn and hua is multifaceted. Compare these explanations.

The exact difference between [biàn] and huà is perhaps more uncertain [than fǎn "reaction" and huán "return"]. In modern Chinese usage, [biàn] tends to signify gradual change, transformation or metamorphosis; while huà tends to mean sudden and profound transmutation or alteration (as in a rapid chemical reaction)—but there is no very strict frontier between the words. [Biàn] could be used of weather changes, insect metamorphosis, or slow personality transformations; huà may refer to the transition points in dissolving, liquefying, melting, etc., and to profound decay. [Biàn] tends to be associated with form (xing) and huà with matter ([zhi]). When a snowman melts, the form changes ([biàn]) as the snow melts (huà) to water. In the Sung dynasty, [Cheng Yi] explained biàn as implying inward change with full or partial conservation of the external Gestalt or form, and huà as fundamental change in which the outward appearance is also altered.

Huà 化 denotes a fundamental and essential change—a transformation. However, sometimes one also encounters the word [biàn], denoting external, momentary, or apparent change. A locus classicus for this distinction is in the [Guanzi] ...: "The exemplary man ([shengren]) changes ([biàn]) in accordance with the times without transforming [the essence of his being]" ... This in turn permits us to understand the passage in the [Huangdi neijing suwen] ...: "When the beings take rise (sheng 生 ...), this is called huà (transformation); when the beings have reached their full development [極] ... [and consequently have taken on a different appearance], this is called [biàn] (change).

biàn has the sense of alteration among states of being (for example, from a yin to a yang state, or vice versa) or of variation within defined parameters. It differs from huà 化, "transformation", in implying alternation or variation rather than fundamental and lasting change. The change from a caterpillar to a butterfly, for example, which is both substantive and irreversible, is a frequently cited instance of huà in the earlier literature. By contrast, a change that involves the realignment of constituent parts in a dynamic system (and that may be or is regularly reversed), such as that from day to night and back again, would be considered an instance of biàn.

Wing-Tsit Chan lists biànhuà "transfiguration and transformation" as a basic Chinese philosophical concept. biànhuà has very diverse meanings, from basic "change and transformation" to "universal life" or "creation", even referring to the Daoist "science of metamorphosis" and generically "supernatural powers obtained by either magical practices or meditation exercises".

== Early usages ==
The (c. 4th century) encyclopedic Guanzi text uses biànhuà 5 times (3 in the 心術; Xinshu; "Mind Techniques" chapters). Where the 形勢; Xingshi; "Conditions and Circumstances" chapter says "The Way brings about the transformation of the self", the corresponding 形勢解; "Explanation" chapter elucidates "The Way is the means by which the self is transformed so a person will adhere to correct principles."

The ancient Yijing or Book of Changes has 12 usages of biànhuà describing the manifestation of everything in heaven and on earth. All occur in the (c. 3rd century BCE) Ten Wings commentaries, and none in the (c. 7th century BCE) core hexagram and line statements.

For hexagram 1 乾; Qian; "The Creative", the "Commentary on the Decision" (彖傳傳) says:

- The way of the Creative works through change and transformation, so that each thing receives its true nature and destiny and comes into permanent accord with the Great Harmony; this is what furthers and what perseveres.

Kong Yingda's sub-commentary distinguishes biàn and huà: "'Alternation' refers to afterwards changing from a former state, it has gradually changed. This is called 'alteration'. 'Transformation' refers to existence in one moment and absence of existence in the next, it has suddenly changed. This is called 'transformation'."

Biànhuà occurs most often (8 times) in the "Appended Judgments Commentary" (繫辭傳) or "Great Commentary" (大傳). Three contexts mention the work of divine sages.

- The holy sages were able to survey all the confused diversities under heaven. They observed forms and phenomena and made representations of things and their attributes [which became the basis for the Yijing]... Through observation and discussion they [the holy sages] perfected the changes and seasons.
- The Master [presumably Confucius] said: Whoever knows the tao of the changes and transformations, knows the action of the gods".
- Heaven creates divine things; the holy sage takes them as models. Heaven and earth change and transform; the holy sage imitates them.

In written Japanese, 変化 can be pronounced henka "change (state)" (in Kan-on reading) or the Buddhist henge 変化 "incarnation" (Go-on reading). The Nihon Kokugo Daijiten (2001) notes both pronunciations were first recorded during the Nara period; henge 変化 "A god, Buddha, spirit, etc. that temporarily appearing in human form, or such a thing. Avatar. Reincarnation" (神仏, 天人などが仮に人間の姿になって現われること. また, そのもの. 神仏の化身 (けしん). 権化 (ごんげ).; c. 810-824 Nihon Ryōiki); and henka 変化 "A change from one nature, state, etc. to another, or, such changeability" (ある性質, 状態などが他の性質や状態に変わること, または, 変えること.; 827 Keikokushū).

== Daoist usages ==
The Daoist idea of biànhuà, "that the certainty that the world is in flux leaves open the possibility that things may transform from one type to another", can be traced from the Zhuangzi through the Shangqing School.

The (c. 3rd century BCE) Zhuangzi was the first Daoist text to explain biànhuà. The word occurs five times (all in the Outer Chapters), referring to the ability of things to change from one category to another. For instance,

Spring and summer precede, autumn and winter come after—such is the sequence of the four seasons. The myriad things evolve and develop; even twisted little shoots have their own special shapes—such are the gradations of fullness and decline, the flow of transformation and evolution [biànhuà]. (13)

The Zhuangzi text begins with a parable about interspecific metamorphosis.

In the darkness of the Northern Ocean, there is a fish named K'un. The K'un is so big that no one knows how many thousands of tricents [three hundred paces] its body extends. After it metamorphoses [huà] into a bird, its name becomes P'eng. The P'eng is so huge that no one knows how many thousands of tricents its back stretches. Rousing itself to flight, its wings are like clouds suspended in the sky. (1)

The Zhuangzi uses the closely related word 物化; wuhua; "transformation of things" ten times, most famously in the story of Zhuangzi dreaming he was a butterfly.

Once upon a time Chuang Chou dreamed that he was a butterfly, a butterfly flitting about happily enjoying himself. He didn't know that he was Chou. Suddenly he awoke and was palpably Chou. He did not know whether he was Chou who had dreamed of being a butterfly or a butterfly dreaming that he was Chou. Now, there must be a difference between Chou and the butterfly. This is called the transformation of things. (2)

A Zhuangzi passage explains change in the sense of evolutionary continuity.

In seeds there are germs [幾]. When they are found in water they become filaments. When they are found at the border of water and land they become algae. When they germinate in elevated places they become plantain. When the plantain is found in fertile soil it becomes crow's foot. The crow's foot's roots become scarab grubs and its leaves become butterflies. The butterflies soon evolve into insects that are born beneath the stove. They have the appearance of exuviae and are called "house crickets:" After a thousand days the house crickets become birds called "dried surplus bones." The spittle of the dried surplus bones becomes a misty spray and the misty spray becomes mother of vinegar. Midges are born from mother of vinegar; yellow whirligigs are born from fetid wine; blindgnats are born from putrid slimebugs. When goat's-queue couples with bamboo that has not shooted for a long time, they produce greenies. The greenies produce panthers; panthers produce horses; horses produce men; and men return to enter the wellsprings of nature [機]. The myriad things all come out from the wellsprings and all reenter the wellsprings. (18)

Liu An's (c. 139 BCE) Huainanzi uses biànhuà 17 times. For instance, this hunchback story about 子求; Ziqiu; "Master Seek", adapted from the Zhuangzi (6) description of 子輿; Ziyu; "Master Chariot".

Ziqiu had lived for fifty-four years when an injury made him hunchbacked. The arch of his spine was higher than his forehead; his chin pressed down on his chest; his two buttocks were on top; his rectum pointed to the sky. He crawled over to peer at himself in a well: "Amazing! That which fashions and transforms us! How has it turned me into this crumpled thing?" This shows that from his viewpoint, alterations and transformation [biànhuà] are the same. (7)

The Huainanzi describes transformations in nature: "Now the frog becomes a quail, [and] the water scorpion becomes the dragonfly. These give rise to what is not their own kind. Only the sage understands their transformations." To know the biànhuà of things is the hallmark of spiritual knowledge.

While the Daodejing text does not use biànhuà, its (c. 2nd century CE) commentary attributed to Heshang Gong (河上公; 'Riverbank Elder') uses the word twice, explaining the transformations of dragons and spirits. The text and commentary for Section 26 (重德) says:

Gravity is the root of lightness.

If a prince is not grave, then he is not honoured. If asceticism is not taken seriously, then the spirits are lost. The blossoms and leaves of the herbs and trees are light, therefore they are perishable. The root is heavy, therefore it is lasting.

Quietness is the master of motion.

If a prince is not quiet, then he loses his dignity. If the ascetic is not quiet, then he endangers himself. The dragon is quiet, therefore he is able to transform [biànhuà]. The tiger is restless, therefore he strives for heavenly faults.

Section 39 (法本) says:

The spirits acquired unity. Thereby they are magic-endowed.

This means: The spirits acquired unity. Thereby they are able to change [biànhuà] and to become formless.

The valley-streams acquired unity. Thereby they are filled out.

This means: The valley-streams acquired unity. Therefore they may be filled without ceasing to exist.

The (c. 2nd century CE) 老子變化經; Lǎozǐ biànhuà jīng; "Scripture of the Transformations of Laozi", which is preserved in a fragmentary (612 CE) Dunhuang manuscript discovered in the Mogao Caves, uses biànhuà to describe the many historical reincarnations of Laozi 老子, deified as Laojun (老君; "Lord Lao"). This text says Laozi "can make himself bright or dark, disappear and then be present, enlarge or diminish himself, coil up or extend himself, put himself above or below, can be vertical or horizontal, (and) can go forward or backward." In every generation, this Master of Emperors cosmically "transforms his own body" in order to teach humanity, through the incarnate power of the Dao, he assumes numerous identities, and leaves behind adapted writings with his teaching. The transformations of Laojun began with the first mythical ruler Fu Xi, included Gautama Buddha, the Yellow Emperor's teacher Guangzhengzi (廣成子; "Master Broadly Complete") (mentioned in the Zhuangzi), and ended with a 155 CE manifestation in the Sichuan region.

Mark Csikszentmihalyi distinguishes between early Daoist discussions that tended to emphasize the way in which biànhuà applies to human beings in the same way it does to the natural world, and later Daoism that stressed the potential for the adept to harness biànhuà, particularly in the eschatological picture of the Shangqing tradition.

Like Laozi, the diverse spirits of the Shangqing tradition are able to transform themselves, and the adept had to be able to identify their different manifestations. Adepts, in turn, might use biànhuà to transform themselves. The Shangqing text Shenzhou qizhuan qibian wutian jing 神州七轉七變舞天經 (Scripture of the Divine Continent on the Dance in Heaven in Seven Revolutions and Seven Transformations; CT 1331) describes methods for transforming into clouds, light, fire; water, and dragons.

Isabelle Robinet notes that "the powers of metamorphosis had always been a key characteristic of the immortals, but these powers came to be even more central in Shangqing where they were synonymous with deliverance and salvation."

Biànhuà was employed by both Daoist mystics and Fangshi magicians. The Daoist adept practices metamorphosis both internally through meditation on colored breaths and gods within the body, and externally using magic to change the appearances of things. Ge Hong's (c. 320 CE) Baopuzi explains these extraordinary powers of Daoists. Describing the multilocation technique called fenxing "divide/multiply the body", Ge Hong says his uncle Ge Xuan could be in several dozen places at once: "When guests were present there could be one host speaking with the guests in the house, another host greeting guests beside the stream, and still another host making casts with his fishing line, but the guests were unable to distinguish which was the true one." 隱形; Yǐnxíng; "invisibility" is another manifestation of biànhuà. The Baopuzi says: "What is it that the arts of transformation cannot do? May I remind my readers that the human body, which is normally visible, can be made to disappear. Ghosts and gods are normally invisible, but there are ways and means to make them visible. Those capable of operating these methods and prescriptions will be found to abound wherever you go."

Several centuries after Chinese Buddhists borrowed the Daoist meaning of biànhuà or huà "manifest through transformation; incarnate", early Tang dynasty Daoists elaborated the Buddhist doctrine about a Buddha's "three bodies" (see below) into a theory that the True Body of the Dao, the Supreme Truth, assumes different metaphoric "bodies" in order to manifest as specific deities, including those in the Laozi bianhuajing. The (late 8th century) Daoist 三論元旨; sānlùn yuánzhǐ explains that: "The saint responds to all things, but his essence is distinct from them. Therefore, since his transcendent root is immobile, he is called the "true body" [真身; zhēnshēn] and since he propagates the form of the Law, he is called the "responsive body" [應身; yīngshēn]. This text further contrasts the True Body with the "transformation body" [化身; huàshēn or biànhuàshēn, used for nirmāṇa-kāya] and the "trace body" [跡身; jishen], in the sense that all teachings are traces of truth.

== Buddhist usages ==
Early Buddhist translators chose Chinese 變化; biànhuà as the equivalent for Sanskrit nirmāṇa "transformation; supernatural manifestation; reincarnation".

Charles Muller's Digital Dictionary of Buddhism defines biànhuà as basically meaning "transformation of things", and distinguishes four senses:

1. (Skt. nirmāṇa) The transformation of myriad forms in manifesting appearances, especially the mutation of buddhas and bodhisattvas, e.g. 變化人 becoming men; also 變化土 the land where they dwell, whether the Pure Land or any impure world where they live for its enlightenment.
2. To transform, change, change into, become. To manifest through supernormal power.
3. The mind that discriminates all objects as having inherent existence (sixth and seventh consciousnesses).
4. The third of the four kinds of reality-bodies of the Buddha, according to Yogâcāra.

Monier Monier-Williams's Sanskrit-English Dictionary translates nirmāṇa निर्माण as "measuring, measure, reach, extent", "forming, making, creating", "(Buddhist literature) transformation", "essence, essential/best part of anything" (sāra), and "unconformity, impropriety, unbecomingness" (asamañjasa).

The common Buddhist term 變化身; biànhuàshēn or 化身; huàshēn; "transformation-body; manifested-body" (translating nirmāṇakāya) refers to one of the 三身; sanshen (trikāya) "three bodies [of a buddha]" doctrine, along with the 法身; fǎshēn; 'dharma-body', 'truth-body' (dharmakāya), and 報身; bàoshēn; 'reward-body', 'bliss-body' (saṃbhogakāya संभोगकाय). Contexts describing Buddhas manifesting as animals and humans use the related terms 變化人; bianhuaren; "magically manifested human body" (nirmita), 變化土; bianhuatu; "transformation land where the inhabitants reincarnate" (nirmāṇa-kṣetra निर्माण क्षेत्र), and *變化生; bianhuasheng; "birth by transformation; miraculous materialization" (upapāduka उपपादुका) .

Besides 變化; biànhuà, Buddhist translators used other Chinese biàn compounds for Sanskrit words dealing with supernatural manifestations. This semantic complex includes 變現; bianxian (with "appearance") translating both vikurvaṇa विकुर्वणा "manifestation through transformation" and prātihārya प्रातिहार्य "miraculous"; and 神變; shenbian (with "god; divine") translating prātihārya "supernatural/miraculous powers; magical feats" and vikurvana "manifestation; transformation".

Victor Mair traced the historical semantics of Chinese bian before and after the (c. 2nd-3rd century) introduction of Buddhism, when it started being used as to translate Sanskrit nirmāṇa meaning "discontinuity or break with reality (illusion)". The pre-Buddhist concept of Chinese biàn referred to "change (from one state to another)", through which one thing becomes another thing. The post-Buddhist concept extended bian to mean "strange" in the sense of "transformation from nothing to something; magically creative power to conjure". The early "strange incident; supernatural transformation" sense of biàn became popular during the early Tang dynasty period, for instance, the (c. 668) Fayuan Zhulin "Pearl Grove in the Garden of the Dharma" used biànhuà "[miraculous] transformation" to describe strange incidents.

== Later usages ==
The Neo-Confucian philosopher Zhu Xi's interpretations of the Chinese classics, which scholars and officials from the 12th to 19th centuries considered to be canonical, differentiated between two types of "change": sudden, transformational bian and gradual, evolutionary huà.

For instance, Zhu explained an ambiguous Yijing statement within the 繫辭傳; Xici zhuan; "Commentary on the Appended Phrases", "That which transforms things and fits them together is called change [化而裁之謂之變]; that which stimulates them and sets them in motion is called continuity", with a lunar analogy: "[The progression] from the first day to the thirtieth day [of a lunar month] is huà (transformation). Having reached this thirtieth day, concluded and made one month, the next day belongs to the next month. This is pien (change)." This "change" distinction also applied to lines in the Yijing hexagrams, which are either unbroken, solid Yang lines or broken, open Yin ones: "Pien is from a yin [line] to a yang [line]. [It] changes suddenly. Therefore, it is called "change" (pien). [The change] from yin to yang naturally grows to become sudden. This is called change. From yang to yin, it gradually goes on vanishing and wearing out."

Zhu Xi used the biàn/huà distinction to explain a difficult passage in the Doctrine of the Mean – "When moved, it is change; when changed, it is transformed [動則變，變則化]" – "When changed, its old conventions have already been altered, but there still are traces. When transformed, they have completely vanished and transformed, and there are no longer any traces."

Biànhuà continues to be a linguistically productive word, as evident in Chinese technical neoloigisms like bianhuali; "paradigm", 變化球; bianhuaqiu; "breaking ball", 變化語; bianhuayu; "inflective language", and 變化盲視; bianhuamangshi; "change blindness".

== See also ==
- Bianwen (transformation texts) 變文 "transformation texts", an early vernacular literary form in Chinese literature
- 變化 Change, an album by the Singaporean singer Derrick Hoh
- Huashu 化書 "Book of Transformations", a 10th-century Daoist classic about internal alchemy, subjectivity, and spiritual transformation
