= Omnipresence =

Property of being present everywhere

Omnipresence or ubiquity is the attribute of being present anywhere and everywhere at the same time. The term omnipresence is most often used in a religious context as an attribute of a deity or supreme being, while the term ubiquity is generally used to describe something "existing or being everywhere at the same time, constantly encountered, widespread, common".

The omnipresence of a supreme being is conceived differently by different religious systems. In monotheistic religions like Islam, Christianity and Judaism, the divine and the universe are separate, but the divine is in attributes present everywhere. People use omnipresence often to describe a god in religions. In pantheistic beliefs, the divine and the universe are identical. In panentheistic beliefs, the divine interpenetrates the universe, but extends beyond it in time and space.

== Etymology ==
The word omnipresence derives from the Latin prefix omni-, meaning "all", and the word praesens, meaning "present". Thus, the term means "all present".

== Introduction ==
Hinduism, and other religions that derive from it, incorporate the theory of transcendent and immanent omnipresence which is the traditional meaning of the word Brahman. This theory defines a universal and fundamental substance, which is the source of all physical existence.

Divine omnipresence is thus one of the divine attributes, although in Western Christianity it has attracted less philosophical attention than such attributes as omnipotence, omniscience, or being eternal.

In Western theism, omnipresence is roughly described as the ability to be "present everywhere at the same time", referring to an unbounded or universal presence. Omnipresence means minimally that there is no place to which God's knowledge and power do not extend. It is related to the concept of ubiquity, the ability to be everywhere or in many places at once. This includes unlimited temporal presence.

William Lane Craig states that we shouldn't think of God as being in space in the sense of being spread out like an invisible ether throughout space. He is not like an invisible gas that is everywhere present in space. This would be incorrect for several reasons. For one, it would mean that if the universe is finite, which is perfectly possible, then God would be finite. We do not want to say that because God is infinite. More seriously, if God is spread out throughout space, like an invisible ether, that means that he is not fully present everywhere. Craig argues that omnipresence is a derived characteristic: an omniscient and omnipotent deity knows everything and can be and act everywhere, simultaneously. Others propound a deity as having the "Three O's", including omnipresence as a unique characteristic of the deity. Most Christian denominations — following theology standardized by the Nicene Creed — explain the concept of omnipresence in the form of the "Trinity", by having a single deity (God) made up of three omnipresent persons, Father, Son and Holy Spirit.

== Omnipresence in religions ==
Several ancient cultures, such as the Vedic and the Native American civilizations share similar views on omnipresent nature; the ancient Egyptians, Greeks and Romans did not worship an omnipresent being. While most Paleolithic cultures followed polytheistic practices, a form of omnipresent deity arises from a worldview that does not share ideas with mono-local deity cultures. Some omnipresent religions see the whole of existence as a manifestation of the deity. There are two predominant viewpoints here: pantheism, the deity is the summation of Existence, and panentheism, the deity is an emergent property of existence. The first is closest to the Native Americans' worldview; the latter resembles the Vedic outlook.. However, ample evidence exists in Vedic texts showing omnipresence and immanent transcendence. In one such Vedic text, namely Isavasya Upanishad, from Shukla Yajur Veda Samhita, verses 40:1,5 clearly show immanence and omnipresence, while verses 40:4,8 clearly establish transcendence with respect to matter, time and no limitations of any kind.

=== Judaism ===
The monotheist worldview of mainstream Judaism rejects the belief of panentheism and an omnipresent God. While the "entire concept of God occupying physical space, or having any category of spatial reference apply to him was completely rejected by pure Judaic monotheism," Hasidic teachings, along with certain Kabbalistic systems, diverged to postulate belief in panentheism.

=== Christianity ===
In Christianity God is omnipresent and still transcendent to his creation and yet immanent in relating to creation. God is not immersed in the substance of creation, even though he can interact with it as he chooses. He can make his human-divine body visible anytime and everywhere, whatever he wants: he cannot be excluded from any location or object in creation. God's presence is continuous throughout all of creation, though it may not be revealed in the same way at the same time to people everywhere. At times, he may be actively present in a situation, while he may not indicate that he is present in another circumstance in some other area. God is omnipresent in a way that he can interact with his creation however he chooses and is the very essence of his creation. While contrary to ordinary physical intuitions, such omnipresence is logically possible by way of the classic geometric point or its equivalent, in that such a point is, by definition, within all of space without taking up any space. The Bible states that God can be both present to a person in a manifest manner (Psalm 46:1, Isaiah 57:15) as well as being present in every situation in all of creation at any given time (Psalm 33:13-14).

Specifically, Oden states that the Bible shows that God can be present in every aspect of human life:

- God is naturally present in every aspect of the natural order, in every level of causality, every fleeting moment, and meaningful event of natural history... (Psalm 8:3, Isaiah 40:12, Nahum 1:3)
- God is bodily present in the Incarnation (Christianity) of his Son, Jesus Christ. (Gospel of John 1:14, Colossians 2:9)
- God is sacredly present and becomes known in special places where God chooses to meet us, places that become set apart by the faithful remembering community (1 Corinthians 11:23-29) where it may say: "Truly the Lord is in this place". (Genesis 28:16, Matthew 18:20)

Marbaniang points out that omnipresence does not mean divine occupation of all space, nor divine distribution overall space, nor indwelling of every entity, nor that God cannot move in space, nor the diversification of the universe, but means that God is fully present everywhere and that God can do different things at different places at the same time.

=== Islam ===
Islam, Shia, or Sunni do not believe in omnipresence.

In Athari Islam, Allah is above his throne, in the direction of "aboveness", the Hanafi scholar Ibn Abi Al-'Izz said in Sharh At-Tahaawiyyah:

"The statements of the Salaf (righteous predecessors) about affirming the attribute of 'uluww (aboveness, Allah being above his throne which is above the seventh heaven, therefore Allah is above everything) are many. For instance, Shaykhul-Islam Abu Ismaa'eel Al-Ansaari said in his book Al-Farooq with a chain of narration up to Mutee' Al-Balkhi that he asked Abu Haneefah about the person who says, 'I do not know whether my Lord is in the heaven or on the earth.' He (Abu Haneefah) said, 'He has committed kufr (disbelief), because Allaah says (what means): {The Most Merciful (Who is) above the Throne established.} [Quran 20:5], and His Throne is above seven heavens.' He further asked Imaam Abu Haneefah, 'What if he says, 'He is above the Throne but I do not know whether the Throne is in heaven or on earth'.' Imaam Abu Haneefah replied, 'He is kaafir (a disbeliever) because he denies that He is in heaven. Whoever denies that He is in heaven has committed kufr.' Another narrator added, 'Because Allaah is above the highest heaven, and He is supplicated upwards not downwards (i.e. people raise their heads towards the heaven and stretch their hands upwards towards Allaah).'" [Sharh Al-'Aqeedah At-Tahaawiyyah]

and the scholars of the Salaf, who are the source of Athari theology state:

Abu Nasr As-Sijzee Al-Hanafi (d. 444 H.) said in "Al-Ibanah": "Our Imams such as Sufyan Ath-Thawri, Malik, Hammad bin Salamah, Hammad bin Zayd, Abdullah bin al-Mubarak, Al-Fudail bin `Iyad, Ahmad bin Hanbal, and Ishaq bin Rahwaih, are upon agreement that Allah –Subhanahu wa Ta`ala is by His Essence (bi-dhatihi) above the Throne, and His Knowledge is everywhere."

In Ash'ari Islam, God has no body or direction and is not bound by space or time.

According to Shia tradition in Nahj al-Balagha, a compilation of Ali's teachings and letters, with commentary by Morteza Motahhari, God is with everything, but not in anything, and nothing is with him. God is not within things, though not out of them. He is over and above every kind of condition, state, similarity, and likeness. Ali says about God's omnipresence:

- "He is with everything but not in physical nearness. He is different from everything but not in physical separation."
- "He is not inside things in the sense of physical [pervasion or] penetration and is not outside them in the sense of [physical] exclusion [for exclusion entails a kind of finitude]."
- "He is distinct from things because He overpowers them, and the things are distinct from Him because of their subjection to Him."

Sunnis however, cite that those narrations lack any actual crediation or authentic isnad to Ali.

== See also ==
- Ubiquitous computing
- Panentheism in Judaism
- Uniformity of nature and laws of physics
- Immanent realism
- Fenshen; Daoist concept of being in multiple locations simultaneously.
