= Zuo Ci =

Legendary 2nd/3rd century Chinese magician

Zuo Ci 左慈
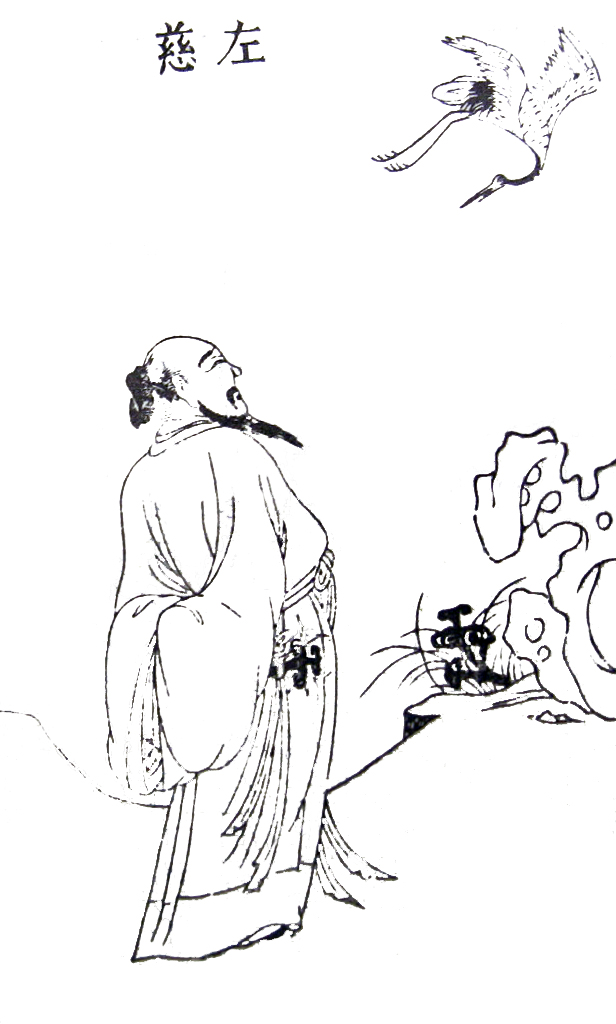
- An illustration of Zuo Ci in Sancai Tuhui
- Born: Lu'an, Anhui
- Other name: Yuan Fang (元放)
- Occupation: Philosopher

Zuo Ci (Chinese: 左慈), courtesy name Yuanfang, was a Chinese philosopher. He was a legendary personage of the late Eastern Han dynasty and the Three Kingdoms period of China. Though he is known to be from Lujiang Commandery (盧江郡; around present-day Lu'an, Anhui), the years of his birth and death are unknown. It is believed that he had existed before the collapse of the Han dynasty, and it is claimed that he lived until the age of 300. He learned his magic and path to longevity from the Taoist sage Feng Heng (封衡), and eventually passed his arts to Ge Xuan.

== In historical texts ==
Zuo Ci studied atop Mount Tianzhu, practiced medicinal alchemy and nourished his vital essence by controlled breathing and Taoist sexual practices. It is said that he could live for long periods without eating. He was also learned in the Confucian classics and in astrology.

The Shenxian zhuan (Biographies of Divine Transcendents) says Zuo Ci was expert in fenshen multilocation, divination, the power of summoning the xingchu "traveling kitchen", and the practice of alchemy (Pregadio 2008: 1305).

At some time before 200, the local warlord Sun Ce, who was a strict Confucian, wanted to kill Zuo Ci and chased him on horseback. Zuo Ci, unmounted, still managed to escape by seemingly walking slowly.

Later, Zuo Ci went to Cao Cao who granted him a pension to continue practicing his magic. While this may have suggested that Cao Cao was interested in the Taoist approach to longevity, his son Cao Zhi wrote that the pensions were merely intended to keep magicians and their wild teachings under control.

Zuo Ci performed a number of magical feats at Cao Cao's court, such as catching an exotic fish from an empty copper pan and teleporting far away to buy ginger. On one occasion, Zuo Ci fed an entire court assembly with food and wine. However, Cao Cao soon discovered that Zuo had used his magic to empty every wine shop in the region to achieve this. Furious, Cao Cao attempted to execute Zuo Ci, but Zuo escaped by walking through walls. In other versions of the story, Cao Cao felt threatened by Zuo Ci's power, and that is why he intended to kill him.

When someone reported that Zuo Ci had been seen in the market, everyone in the market suddenly took on Zuo’s exact appearance. Another report claimed Zuo Ci had fled to a mountaintop. Cao Cao and his men went there, only to realize that Zuo was concealed among a flock of sheep. Unable to locate him, Cao Cao addressed the flock, declaring that he was merely testing Zuo Ci’s skills and had no intention of killing him. At that moment, a goat stood on its hind legs and asked, "Is this true?" Cao Cao immediately ordered his men to shoot it with arrows, but suddenly the rest of the flock also turned into goats that stood and spoke all asked the same question in unison, leading Cao Cao to finally give up on killing the Taoist.

Zuo Ci was never found by Cao Cao’s men again.

Zuo Ci eventually retired from the world to practise his arts in the mountains.

== In Romance of the Three Kingdoms ==
As described in the 14th-century historical novel Romance of the Three Kingdoms, Zuo Ci was a Taoist known under the name of Master Black Horn (烏角先生). The novel describes Zuo Ci's fictional attainment of Taoist powers and his subsequent mission to persuade Cao Cao to follow Taoism.

Zuo Ci wielded amazing Taoist power and was described as a psychic. He studied on Mount Emei in Sichuan, where he found The Book of Concealing Method (遁甲天書), from which he learned to "ascend to the clouds astride the wind, to sail up into the great void itself;" and how "...to pass through mountains and penetrate rocks; ...to float light as vapor, over the seas, to become invisible at will or change [his] shape, to fling swords and project daggers so as to decapitate a man from a distance."

Zuo Ci offered Cao Cao the books if Cao himself became a disciple of Taoism. Cao Cao responded, "Often have I reflected upon this course and struggled against my fate, but what can I do? There is no one to maintain the government," when Zuo Ci suggested Liu Bei and threatened Cao Cao, " I may have to send one of my flying swords after your head one day", Cao accused Zuo of being one of Liu Bei's agents, and threatened him. Zuo Ci openly mocked Cao Cao in court and Cao had him arrested; the guards beat Zuo cruelly, but the Taoist then fell asleep and slept soundly through the night. This enraged Cao Cao, who ordered Zuo Ci to be starved of food, this also failed as Zuo quite happily went seven days without food or water. After this Cao Cao could think of nothing else to punish Zuo Ci. When Zuo Ci appeared at Cao Cao's banquet, Cao tested him by asking to get, among other things, a dragon's liver, a peony, and perch from the Song River. Zuo Ci accomplished everything, which drew further suspicion from Cao Cao. Zuo Ci then offered a cup of wine to Cao Cao, who said that Zuo should taste first. Zuo Ci took a stick and divided the wine in half, and drank one half. Cao Cao was enraged.

As a result, Cao Cao ordered Zuo Ci to be executed, but Zuo had disappeared. Cao Cao sent his general Xu Chu to capture Zuo Ci, Xu saw Zuo walking among a flock of sheep and slew the flock, thinking Zuo had become a sheep; when Xu had left the shepherd boy who had been tending the flock heard one of the sheep's heads telling him to place the heads next to the bodies to bring them back to life, the boy did this and the sheep returned to life. After Xu Chu failed to capture Zuo Ci, Cao Cao put out posters calling for Zuo Ci's capture, and as a result hundreds of men matching the exact description of Zuo were found, and Cao ordered them all executed. When they were all executed black vapor rose from their necks where they joined to form another image of Zuo Ci. The image summoned a crane for him to sit on, and Cao Cao had archers to shoot him down. Suddenly, a gust of wind brought the decapitated corpses back to life. The reanimated corpses carried their heads and started to beat Cao Cao. Cao Cao fainted due to shock, the winds died down, and Zuo Ci disappeared along with the corpses.

== In popular culture ==
Zuo Ci is featured as a playable character in Koei's Dynasty Warriors and Warriors Orochi video game series.

In the Shaw Brothers film Five Element Ninjas, Zuo Ci was briefly mentioned in the film for being a founder of Ninjutsu with his Taoist arts. It was said that he used them to trick Cao Cao during his battles. This is referenced in another Shaw Brothers film, The Weird Man, where he tricked Cao Cao with his sorcery and he was also Yu Ji's spiritual brother.

== See also ==
- Lists of people of the Three Kingdoms
- Longevity myths
