= Digital Dictionary of Buddhism =

The project of the Digital Dictionary of Buddhism (usually referred to by the acronym DDB) was initiated by Charles Muller, a specialist in East Asian Buddhism, during his first year of graduate school when he realized the dearth of lexicographical works available for both East Asian Buddhism and classical Chinese. Since that time, he has continued to compile the terminology from the texts that he has studied and translated, extending for almost twenty years.

In 1995, with the advent of the Internet, Muller converted his data set from the word processor files in which they were originally stored, into HTML format, and placed them on his web site, to make his work-in-progress available to a broad audience, and see if it would be possible to take advantage of the WWW to encourage collaboration in the project.

Numerous scholars came forth to offer assistance in the form of both technical implementation and content contributions. Additionally, the project was able to secure a series of JSPS grants from 1997–2003, which greatly hastened the expansion of the coverage of both works. During this period, the storage format of the dictionaries was changed to SGML, and then XML. In 2001, with the help of Humanities Computing XML specialist Michael Beddow, the dictionaries were placed on the web in XML format with a search engine.

The DDB, as of July 2019, contains over 73,000 entries, including Buddhist terms, texts, schools, temples, and persons. Entries range from short glossary type, to full-length encyclopedic articles. Supported by dozens of collaborators with specialist expertise in many areas of Buddhist studies, the expansion rate of the DDB has been exponential in recent years.

A special dimension of the dictionaries is their usage of XML attributes to accredit contributors for their work at the level entry segments (XML "nodes") rather than only at the level of full entries. Being an ongoing digital project, entries and nodes of the work can be revised and expanded by their original authors, and supplemented by the contributions of others. Also, being a digital compilation, it is full-text searchable, and entries are hyperlinked.

Editorial privileges are limited to accredited specialists in the field of Buddhist Studies, in order to avoid inaccuracies and various sectarian distortions.

Very unusually for an online dictionary, a username and password is required for all access; casual users are still required log in as "guest". Guest users of the dictionary are restricted to ten searches per day. This is a major limitation on the usefulness of the dictionary for those who have no way to earn access by contributing entries.
