= Taixi (embryonic breathing) =

Daoist method of internal breathing

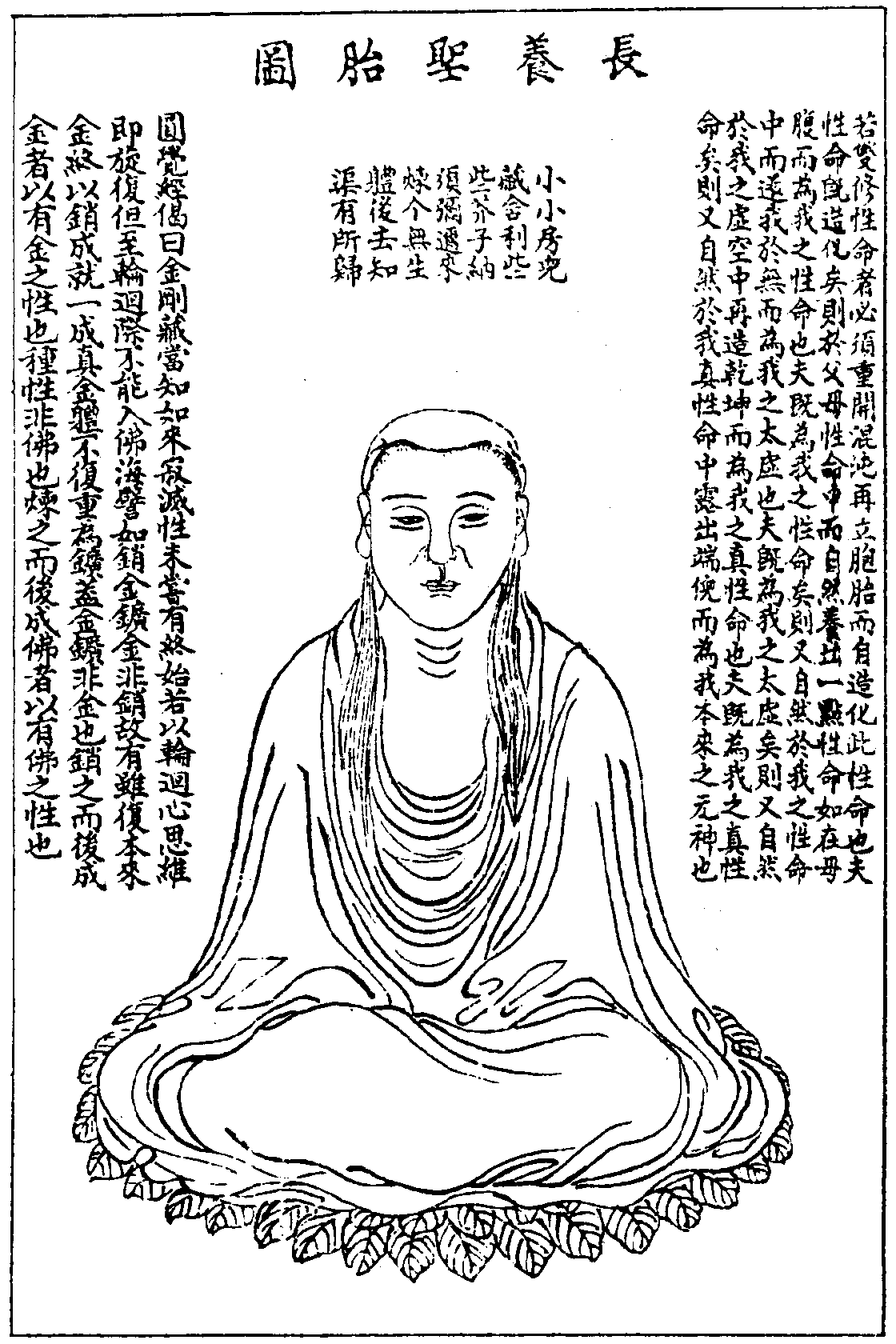
- 1615 woodblock illustration of a female Daoist neidan adept practicing Zhangyang shengtai (長養聖胎; "Growing and Nourishing the Sacred Embryo")

Chinese name
- Chinese: 胎息
- Literal meaning: embryo/fetus breath
Transcriptions
Standard Mandarin
- Hanyu Pinyin: tāixī
- Wade–Giles: t'ai-hsi
Yue: Cantonese
- Jyutping: toi^{1}sik^{1}
Middle Chinese
- Middle Chinese: thojsik
Old Chinese
- Baxter–Sagart (2014): *l̥ˁə*sək

Korean name
- Hangul: 태식
- Hanja: 胎息
Transcriptions
- McCune–Reischauer: taesik

Japanese name
- Kanji: 胎息
- Hiragana: たいそく
Transcriptions
- Revised Hepburn: taisoku

Taixi (Chinese: 胎息, "embryonic breathing" or "embryonic respiration") refers to Daoist meditation and neidan Inner Alchemy methods, the principle of which is to breathe like an embryo or fetus in the womb, without using nose or mouth. Techniques developed for embryonic breathing include xingqi (行氣; "circulating breath"), biqi (閉氣; "breath retention; apnea"), fuqi (服氣; "ingesting breath; aerophagia"), and taishi (胎食; "embryonic eating; swallowing saliva").

In the history of Daoism, Tang dynasty (618-907) Daoist Internal Alchemists fundamentally changed the nature and understanding of embryonic breathing from the ancient theory of waiqi (外氣; "external qi of the air; external breathing") to the new theory of neiqi (內氣; "internal qi of one's organs; internal breathing"). Instead of inhaling and retaining waiqi air, adepts would circulate and remold visceral neiqi energy, which was believed to recreate the yuanqi (元氣; "prenatal qi; primary vitality") received at birth and gradually depleted during human life. Taixi (胎息; "embryonic breathing") was associated with the shengtai (聖胎; "sacred embryo; embryo of sainthood"), which was originally a Chinese Buddhist concept that Tang Daoists developed into a complex process of symbolic pregnancy giving birth to a spiritually perfected doppelganger of oneself.

== Terminology ==
Taixi (胎息) is a linguistic compound of two common Chinese words:

- Tāi (胎)
1. fetus, embryo; womb; something encapsulated like a fetus.
2. embryonic, fetal; source, origin; e.g., (Daoism) 胎息 tāixī, embryonic breathing, technique of "pneuma circulation" 行氣 xingqi in which an adept breathes in stillness, without using nose or mouth, as when in the womb; early stage of development; something in an unfinished state.
3. give birth to; spawn; congenital. ...
- Xī (息)
1. exhale; respiration, suspire, breathe ...
2. to desist from, give up; abate, pause, interrupt, suspend, rest; respite; "blow out," extinguish, put an end to; abandon, lose.
3. to comfort, calm, assuage; treat an illness; e.g., 息心 xīxīn, calm oneself, compose one's mind, be of tranquil mind; (Buddhism) 息心侣 xīxīnlǚ, "companion of the tranquil mind," translation of Sanskrit śramaṇa one who has left passions behind, monk, religious ascetic. ...

Chinese tāi (胎) can ambiguously be translated as English embryo, fetus, or womb. The Chinese lexicon differentiates this gestational semantic field with words such as bāo (胞; "womb; placenta"), pēi (胚; "embryo"), pēitāi (胚胎; "embryo; beginning of things"), tāi'ér (胎兒; "fetus; embryo"), and zǐgōng (子宮; 'child palace'; "uterus; womb").

Chinese taixi (胎息) has various English translations.

- "Embryonic Respiration"
- "embryonic respiration"
- "embryo respiration"
- "Embryonic Breathing"
- "womb breathing"
- "embryonic respiration" or "womb breathing,"
- "embryonic breathing" or "embryonic respiration"
- "Womb Breathing"
- "Embryonic Breathing"
- "embryonic breathing"

Although these translations consistently use embryonic rather than fetal, a newly developing human is typically referred to as an embryo until the ninth week after conception, and subsequently referred to as a fetus.

Catherine Despeux explains how "womb respiration" or "womb breathing" can alternately translate taixi (胎息), which refers to "a manner of respiration that does not involve the nose or the mouth but rather the pores of the skin." When adepts are said to "breathe like an embryo", this expression may also denote the sensation of "something expanding and contracting, or 'breathing' somewhere inside their bodies". And if the term tai is read as "womb" or "matrix," then taixi takes on the sense of "womb respiration." This introspective sensation of expansion and contraction attributed to a breathing embryo is firmly situated in the lower dantian or lower abdomen, where the womb is located.

In Daoist textual terminology, one xī (吸; "inhalation; breathing in") and one hū (呼; "exhalation; breathing out") comprise one xi (息; "respiratory cycle")—compare the common word hūxī (呼吸; "breath, breathing; inhalation and exhalation"). Generally speaking, the air was to be inhaled through the nose, retained as long as possible with the biqi (閉氣; "breath-holding") technique, and then exhaled through the mouth. This presents an "obvious parallel with the conviction that there was vitality in certain secretions of the body so that all losses of them should be avoided."

== Ancient Theory of External Breaths ==
Kristofer Schipper notes that, "embryonic breathing is not a late development in the breathing exercises, but has always existed under different names". As Daoist adepts began to practice taixi embryonic breathing, "things got to be horribly varied and complicated", they developed myriad, and sometimes contradictory, techniques such as the "holding of breath, slowing of breathing, swallowing of air, swallowing of saliva, mental guiding of qi, and inner visualization of internal organs, colored qi or deities."

=== Hou Hanshu ===
The origins of the term embryonic breathing go back at least to the early centuries of the Common Era. The Book of the Later Han, which was compiled in the 5th-century from late Han dynasty (202 BCE – 220 CE) sources, may be the earliest extant reference to taixi (胎息; "embryonic breathing")and the uncommon cognate taishi (胎食; "embryonic eating; saliva swallowing"). This historical text's biography of the fangshi ("esoteric master") Wang Zhen (王真, fl. c. 200) says that he looked under fifty years old when he was over a hundred. It records that Wang and He Mengjie (郝孟節) were both from Shangdang (modern-day south and east Shanxi Province). Wang Zhen practiced "embryonic breathing [胎息], 'embryonic eating [胎食],' subsistence on his own saliva [嗽舌下泉咽之], and incessant bedchamber arts"; while He Mengjie had the "capacity to go without eating and shut up his breath [結氣不息]." From this description of Wang Zhen, Eskildsen says, "it would appear as though the embryonic breathing method was perhaps not actually a breathing technique but rather a method of swallowing saliva. However, it could be that the swallowing technique described here constitutes only 'embryonic eating,' and that there was an accompanying breathing technique that constituted embryonic breathing but is not described." Li Xian's c. 675 commentary to the Book of Later Han notes, "To practice breath holding and gulping it down [習閉氣而吞之] is called taixi, to practice coughing up saliva and swallowing it [習嗽舌下泉而咽之] is called taishi."

Both "embryonic fluid" (胎津; taijin) and "pure water of the jade lake" (玉池清水; yuchi qingshui) refer to saliva, which is called the "water of life" and is supposed to prolong life. The Han people already practiced the method of swallowing saliva to improve the physique and nurture life.

=== Baopuzi ===
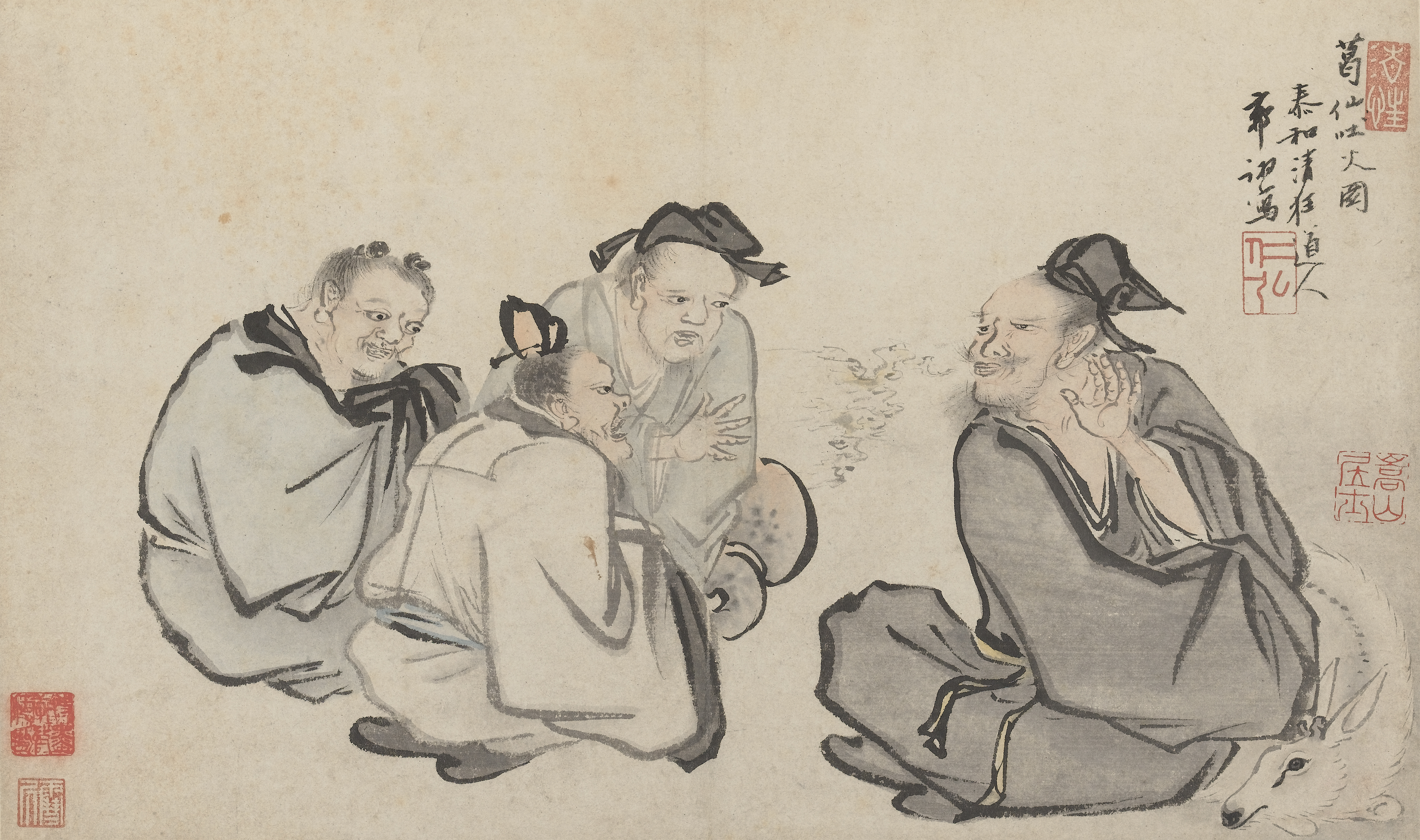
Ge Xuan breathing fire as depicted in a 1503 painting by Guo Xu (郭诩)

The Daoist scholar Ge Hong's 318 CE Baopuzi ("Master Who Embraces Simplicity") is described as "one of the major sources on breath control practices in pre-Tang China". Taixi is mentioned in three of the esoteric Neipian (內篇; "Inner Chapters"). Chapter 19 ("A Taoist Library") is a bibliography that mentions a Taixi jing (胎息經; "Classic of Embryonic Breathing"), which is the name of the possibly related received text (discussed below).

Chapter 3 ("Rejoinder to Popular Conceptions") remarks that since a Daoist adept knows "the great age attained by tortoises and cranes, he imitates their calisthenics so as to augment his own life span", and quotes a xianjing (仙經; "Transcendent Classic") poem: "He who swallows Cinnabar [alchemy] and keeps the One / Will only finish in Heaven / He who makes the Essence return and practises Embryonic Respiration / Will have longevity unlimited".

In Chapter 8 ("Resolving Hesitations"), Ge Hong praises embryonic breathing and tells an underwater breath-holding anecdote about his granduncle Ge Xuan (164–244), who was prominent in early Daoism and the first recipient of the Lingbao sacred scriptures. Ge Hong seems to have understood taixi as the culmination of long-term daily practice of xingqi "pneuma circulation". First, he describes xingqi as a potent panacea and gives a detailed description of timing taixi breath-holding by counting heartbeats.

By practising the circulation of the [qi] [行氣; xingqi] one can cure the hundred diseases, one can walk through the midst of plagues and epidemics, one can ward off snakes and tigers, stop bleeding from wounds, stay under water or walk across it, free oneself from hunger and thirst, and protract one's years. The most important thing is simply to (know how to) breathe like an embryo [胎息]. He who can breathe like a foetus [胎息] will respire [噓吸; xuxi] as if still in the womb [胞胎之中], without using nose or mouth; thus will the Tao be achieved. When one first begins to learn how to circulate the [qi], one must inhale through the nose and then close up that breath. While it is thus hidden within, one counts up to 120 heart-beats [~ 90 seconds], and then exhales it (gently) through the mouth. Neither during exhalation nor inhalation should one hear with one's ears the sound of the breathing, and one should make sure that more goes in than comes out. A wild goose feather may be placed in front of the nose and mouth, and during exhalation this should not show any movement. After continual practice one may very gradually increase the number of heart-beats (during which the breath is held) to as much as 1000 [~ 12 minutes 30 seconds], and when this proficiency is reached, an old man will be able to grow younger daily, returning [還; huan] to youth by one day every day.

Compare Ware's translation, "The most important part of it is simply to breathe like a fetus. He who succeeds in doing this will do his breathing as though in the womb, without using nose or mouth, and for him the divine Process has been achieved." Second, in a context about how few people can successfully practice the art of breath circulation, Ge again mentions his granduncle. "My ancestral uncle [Ge Xuan], whenever he was overcome by wine in the heat of the summer would incontinently retire to the bottom of a deep pool and stay there till the evening—this was because he could retain his breath [閉炁; biqi] and respire like a foetus in the womb [胎息]." The fetal condition "was considered worth reverting to because doing so was thought to constitute a reversal of the aging process and a restoration to the condition that existed when your vital forces had not yet begun to be expended."

Taixi also occurs in one of the exoteric Baopuzi Waipian (外篇; "Outer Chapters"): "It is like 'embryonic-breathing-in-which-the-Mystery-is-preserved' [譬存玄胎息]. In deep breathing we throw out the old and take in the new, retaining the vista and looking inwards." The translator Sailey interpreted the taixi practice of "breathing as in the embryo, … a kind of very deep breathing with both the nose and the mouth enabling one to achieve a state analogous to that of a foetus in a womb."

=== Shenxian zhuan ===
In addition to the Baoupzi, Ge Hong wrote the c. 4th-century (with later additions) Shenxian Zhuan (Biographies of Divine Transcendents), which mentions taixi in four hagiographies.

Two repeat the above Hou Hanshu phrase taixi taishi (胎息胎食; "embryonic breathing and embryonic eating"). The Wang Zhen (王真) hagiography quotes the Hou Hanshu description of his "embryonic breathing, 'embryonic eating', subsistence on his own saliva". The Ji Liao (薊遼) or Ji Zixun (薊子訓) entry has two consecutive sentences, where Campany compared sources and omitted the first "Because he proclaimed methods of embryonic breathing, embryonic eating, stopping aging, and turning white hair black again" [因教令胎息胎食住年止白之法 行之二百余年顏色不老] and translated the second "In over two hundred years his countenance did not age."

The other two Shenxian zhuan hagiographies mention taixi in the phrase taixi neiguan (胎息內視; "embryonic breathing and inner visualization"). The entry for Huang Jing (黃敬) records that "he is said to have circulated pneumas, abstained from grains, subsisted on his saliva, practiced embryonic breathing and interior vision" [專行服氣斷谷, 為吞吐之事, 胎息內視]. The hagiography for Huang Hua (皇化) or Jiuling zi (九靈子) says "He obtained Ways of turning back the years, banishing aging, and fetal breathing [得還年卻老, 胎息內視之要]".

=== Taipingjing ===
The c. 4th-5th century CE Taipingjing ("Classic of the Great Peace") biography of the Daoist Zhenren Zhou Yishan (周義山) says: "Every morning after dawn, when the sun was rising, he stood up straight facing due east, and having rinsed out his mouth, swallowed (much) saliva, then he absorbed the qi [服氣; fuqi] more than a hundred times. This being done he turned towards the sun and saluted it twice. And every morning he repeated these procedures." The air "must be inhaled slowly through the nose, held for as long as possible, and finally exhaled through the mouth".

The Taipingjing also ranks the importance of strict dieting for adepts practicing embryonic respiration, "In the first place feed upon airy breath [食風氣; shi fengqi]; in the second place feed upon drugs; in the third place eat little." The best diets, thus, were those that dispensed with all solid food; either feeding upon saliva, or upon air. The first method was called "Embryonic Nourishment" (胎食; taishi; "swallowing saliva") with a name paralleling "Embryonic Respiration" (胎息; taixi). The second was called "Feeding upon Breath" (食氣; shiqi or 服氣; fuqi) or "Feeding by Respiration" (服息; fuxi).

=== Side effects ===
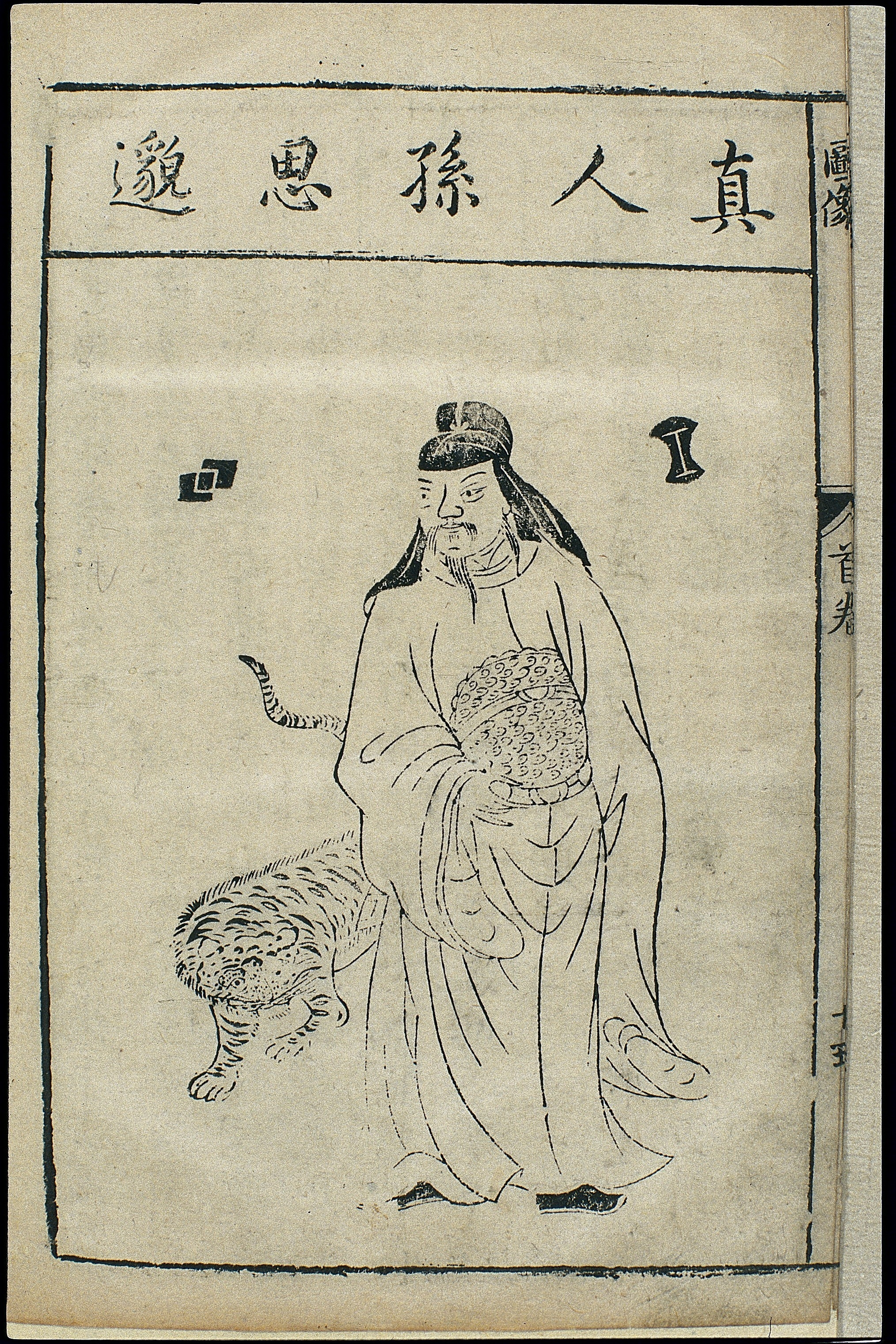
Sun Simiao as depicted in Gan Bozong's (甘伯宗) woodblock print, Tang dynasty (618-907)

Although the Baopuzi says that Ge Xuan could hold his breath underwater all afternoon, even allowing for typical hagiographic exaggeration, attempting extreme biqi (閉氣; "breath-holding") could be dangerous for taixi embryonic respiration practitioners. The current world record for static apnea (without prior breathing of 100% oxygen) is 11 minutes and 35 seconds (Stéphane Mifsud, 8 June 2009).

According to the French sinologist Henri Maspero, Daoists believed that learning to hold one's breath for a long time extends the opportunity to feed upon it. Commenting on the legend that Liu Gen (劉根) supposedly held his breath for three days before becoming a transcendent, "But what a long effort it takes to attain such mastery! The practise of 'holding the breath in' is painful; it brings on all sorts of physiological difficulties, which the Adept has to surmount little by little." Sometimes when an adept holds their breath for too long, "beads of sweat form and the head and feet become heated: this is because the breath is passing through them", and at other times from the strain of "holding the breath firmly, after some time, the belly aches." In traditional Chinese beliefs, respiration is closely associated with digestion and circulation. An adept who practices Embryonic Respiration "in a perfect fashion has no need for ordinary food" because they have "realized the Taoist ideal of 'Feeding upon Breath'" (食氣; shiqi or 服氣; fuqi). Feeding upon Breath could never have been more than a temporary diet; "for if it had been followed too long, death—or, if one wishes to express it in the Taoist way, the Liberation of the Corpse—would have occurred so regularly with the beginning of this practice that it would make the Adepts think again, and cause them to abandon so dangerous a procedure."

Daoist technical terms for breath-holding used the word tong (通; "Chinese classifier for actions"); a "small" xiaotong (小通) was 12 respiratory cycle suppressions [~ 36 seconds], and a "large" datong (大通) was 120 [~ 6 minutes]. Joseph Needham imagines that "serious and painful effort was required", and quotes Sun Simiao's c. 652 Qianjin yaofang (千金要方; "Essential Formulas [Worth] a Thousand Pieces of Gold"): "'At the end of 300 respiratory cycles [~ 15 minutes], the ears have no hearing left, the eyes see no more, the mind can no longer think; then one must stop holding the breath."

The historian of Chinese science Joseph Needham describes the many side effects of biqi and hypothesizes why early adepts eventually abandoned it. This breath-holding technique produced considerable hypoxemia (insufficient oxygen in the blood) with its strange effects, "buzzing in the ears, vertigo, perspiration, sensations of heat and formication in the extremities, fainting and headache." Furthermore, if Daoist breath-holding was practiced in temples on high mountains, it could result in chronic mountain sickness, with symptoms of "headache, dizziness, tinnitus, breathlessness, palpitations, sleep disturbance, fatigue, confusion, cyanosis, and notably loss of appetite." This could have made the delimited diet of the recluses easier to bear, "contributing as it did in its turn to the reduction of cardiac strain and heightened awareness and well-being consequent on loss of all excess body-weight".

Perhaps what happened was that the pre-[T]ang idea of the circulation of the [qi] gradually came to be more emphasized at the expense of the breath-holding—which might indeed have led to certain accidents just as the metallic elixirs did—and thus the breathing became secondary to an imaginative voluntary circulation of the [qi] of the internal organs, with the idea that the more this was done the more the [qi] of primary vitality would be re-formed. This was a significant conceptual expansion, for the "essences" of all the organs were now emphasized as valuable, not only the saliva (from the lungs) and the semen (from the reins); and it did embody the truth that all the organs contribute their products to the blood-stream. This inner round, it was thought, corresponded with the respiratory cycle though not part of it; when the external [qi] came upwards to be exhaled, the internal [qi] also came up from the lowest region of vital heat [dantian], and when the air went down into the lungs in inspiration so also the internal [qi] pursued a downward path. The expression [服氣; fuqi, with fu "ingest; consume (esp. medicine)"] is now increasingly supplemented by the phrase [咽氣; yanqi, with yan "swallow; gulp"], a more specific term for swallowing; this was one process and the circulation was another.

== Tang Theory of Internal Breaths ==
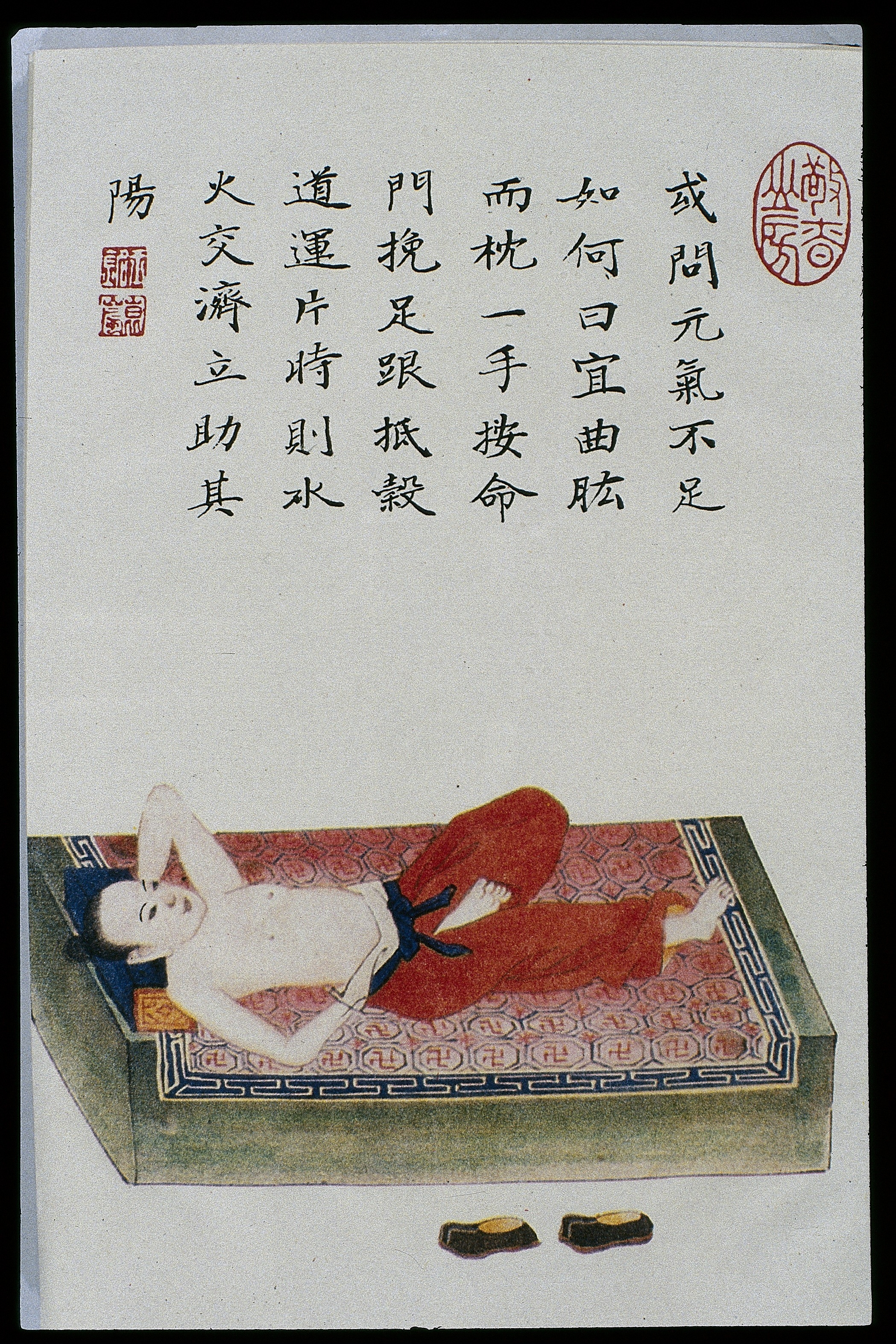
Daoyin technique for strengthening one's Yuanqi ("original qi"), Kun Lan's 1875 Daoyin tu (導引圖; "Drawings of Guiding and Pulling Qi Circulation")

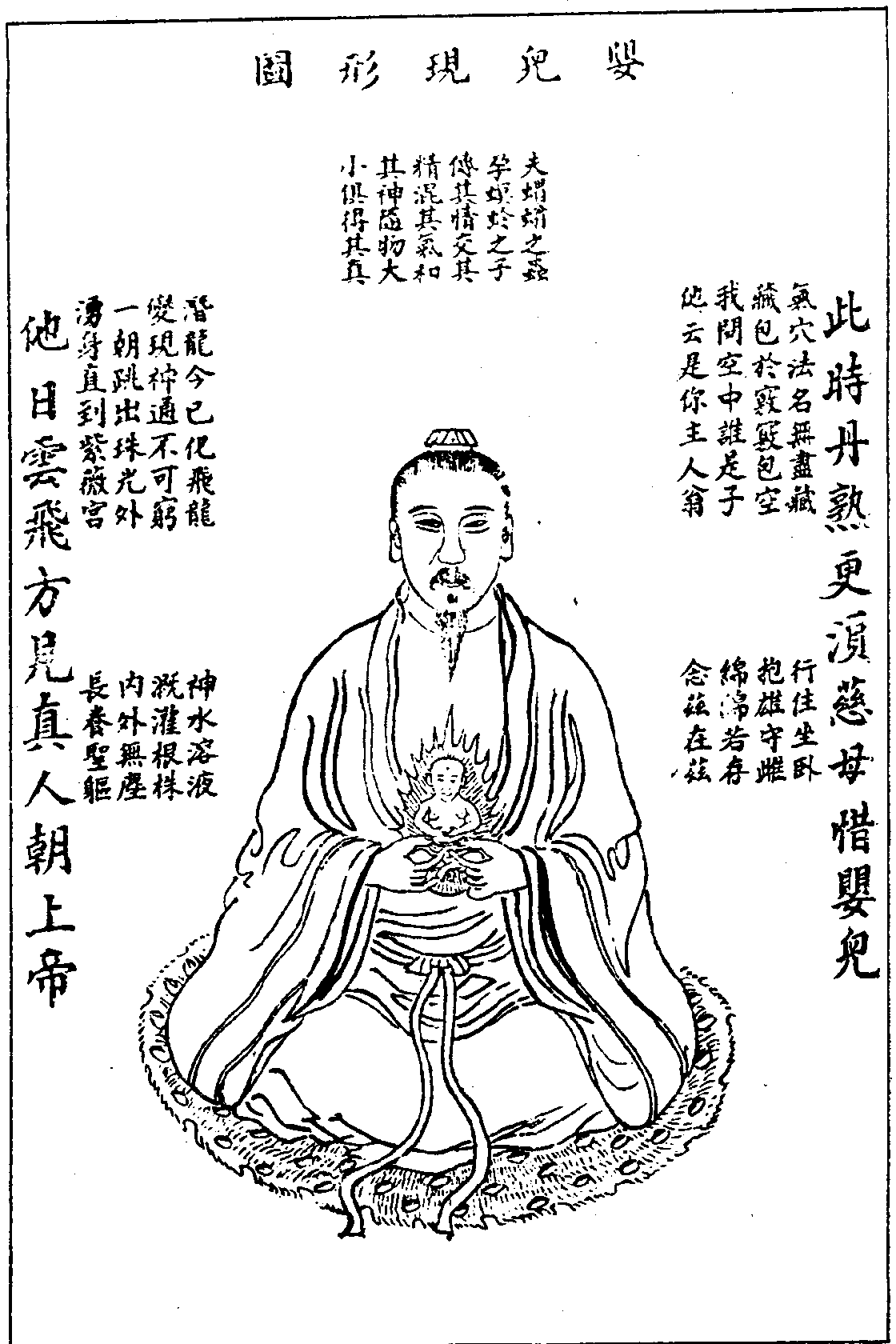
Woodcut illustration of neidan meditation Ying'er xianxing (嬰兒現形; "Generating the [Inner] Infant"), from the 1615 Xingming guizhi "Principles of Balanced Cultivation of Inner Nature and Vital Force")

In what Joseph Needham called "an important turning-point" in the history of taxi embryonic breathing, Henri Maspero revealed that "a great change which came over respiratory technology (if we might so call it)" towards the middle of the Tang dynasty (618-907). Daoist priests realized that breath circulation was not specifically Daoist, since the practice was common in traditional Chinese medicine and Chinese Buddhism."They discovered then that the men of old had interpreted the books wrongly, and that Embryonic Respiration was something else". Instead of traditional Daoist adepts inhaling and circulating the waiqi (外氣; "external qi of the air"), Tang adepts would meditatively visualize manipulating and reshaping the neiqi (內氣; "internal qi of one’s organs"), attempting to recreate their yuanqi (元氣; "original breath; primary vitality") received at birth and gradually used up in the course of life, which may be conserved but never replenished.

Xue Yannian (薛延年, 1252-1313) quotes the c. 664 Dongyuan jing (洞淵經; "Scripture of Cavern Abyss") about the new Tang theory of two breaths. The waiqi external breath, which when "dispersed, is like a cloud of smoke and, gathered together, is like hair, which is seen on the skin, which has the five colors, green, red, yellow, white, and black." The neiqi internal breath of a person "comes from the Cinnabar Field, his breathing is deep; what it nourishes is distant, what it emits is thick. In ordinary people, […] it "rises from the liver and the diaphragm: they breathe like monkeys and puff like rats."

The c. 745 Yanling xiansheng ji xinjiu fuqi jing (延陵先生集新舊服氣經; "Scripture on New and Old Methods for the Ingestion of Breath Collected by the Elder of Yanling") defines the technique: "One must carefully pull the breath while inspiring and expiring so that the Original Breath (元氣; yuanqi) does not exit the body. Thus, the outer and inner breaths do not mix and one achieves embryonic breathing." According to the Taixi jing (胎息經; "Scripture of Embryonic Breathing") "the embryo is formed within the stored breath, and breathing occurs from within the embryo."

The Daoist and Buddhist literature on embryonic breathing expanded during the Tang and the early Song dynasty (960–1279) periods. The following example texts dealing with taixi are limited to major ones with reliable English translations.

=== Taixi jing ===
The Taixi jing (胎息經; "Scripture of Embryonic Breathing"), a.k.a. Gaoshang yuhuang taixi jing (高上玉皇胎息經; "Exalted Jade Sovereign's Scripture on Embryonic Breathing"), is a brief text of 88 characters that dates from circa 755. The Baopuzi above lists a book titled Taixi jing, but it is not mentioned in the bibliographic section of the 636 Book of Sui.

The womb is formed from within the subdued qi. The qi breathes from the inside of where there is a womb. When qi enters the body, you live because of this. When the spirit leaves the body, you die because of this. If you know the spirit and qi, you can live long. Firmly guard the empty nothingness and thereby nurture your spirit and qi. When the spirit goes, the qi goes. When the spirit stays, the qi stays. If you want to live long, spirit and qi must concentrate on one another. If your mind does not give rise to thoughts, it will not come and go. Not leaving and entering, it naturally constantly stays. To diligently practice this is the true road.

Compare Frederic H. Balfour's early English translation: "The Embryo is formed by the concretion of concealed Breath; and the Embryo being brought into existence, the Breath begins to move in Respiration. The entrance of Breath into the body is Life; the departure of the Spirit from the external form is Death."

=== Taixi jing zhu ===
The Tang Taixi jing zhu is found in three versions of the Daoist Canon, two of which are accompanied by a commentary, and one attributes the text to Huanzhen Xiansheng (幻真先生, late 9th century?). The Taixi jing zhu explains that practicing Embryonic Breathing will enable one to keep the yuanqi Primordial Qi, have shen gods enter the body, and thus to attain immortality. For instance, this commentary explains the first Taixi jing sentence.

The sea of breath lies three inches below the navel. It is also (called) the lower [Dantian] (the elixir field.) It is also (called) the dark female [玄牝; Xuanpin]. People usually say that [Xuanpin] is the mouth and the nose. That is wrong. The mouth and the nose are the entering and exiting doors for [Xuanpin]. The word [Xuan] means (also) water, and the word [Pin] means mother. It is known in the world that the Yin and Yang breaths meet and coagulate, (originating) from a (father's) water (sperm) and a mother. It becomes an embryo within three months. The form is completed in ten months and has become a human being. Those who are practicing the nourishing way [Dao], store the breath beneath the navel and keep their soul inside their body. Soul and breath combine together and produce the mysterious embryo. Once the mysterious embryo is conceived, it will produce a body by itself. This is the inner elixir and the way [Dao] of nondeath.

=== Taixi biyao gejue ===
The Tang Taixi biyao gejue explains breathing techniques, proper diet, avoiding foods, and self-cultivation. It begins:

BLOCKING THE BREATH. If you suddenly have a disease that does not involve an injury, gather up your mind and go to a room where you can be at ease. Take off your clothes and lie down on your back on the bed and hold your fists tight. Tap your teeth (often) and burn incense. After you have swallowed 36 swallowings (and done the corresponding blockings) of the breath, the breath in the elixir field will exceed what is normally there. Use your mind to guide it to where you feel the ailment. That is the best way. When perspiration appears, it is the sign to stop. Do not do it in excess so you may reap the best benefits.

This brief text about qi absorption of discusses dietetics, sexual hygiene, and the otherwise-unknown liuqi (六氣; "Six Qi") exercises to be practiced in times of illness.

=== Taixi jingwei lun ===
The Taixi jingwei lun (胎息精微論; "Essay on the Subtlety of Embryonic Breathing") preceded the similarly titled Fuqi jingyi lun below. The Yanling xiansheng ji xinjiu fuqi jing quotes the Taixi jingwei lun in entirety. It describes the taixi method as equivalent with absorbing the neiqi Inner Breath through holding the breath and swallowing saliva seven times.

The Taixi jingwei lun beginning echoes the opening lines of the Taixi jing zhu. "Generally speaking, the womb is formed from within the qi. The qi is produced from the breathing of the womb. The womb gets completed from within the qi. This is glossed as, "If the qi is pure, it will congeal and bind together. If the qi is turbid, it will scatter and exit". Thus, whether the qi will either stay inside to form a womb or exit the body, is contingent upon the purity or turbidity of the qi itself, which the text does not explain.

=== Fuqi jingyi lun ===
The Fuqi jingyi lun Great Clarity Talisman for [Facilitating] Qi Circulation

The Daoist Shangqing School patriarch Sima Chengzhen (司馬承禎, 647-735) composed the 730 Fuqi jingyi lun (服氣精義論; "Essay on the Essential Meaning of Breath Ingestion"), which presented integrated outlines of health practices, with both traditional Chinese physical techniques and the Buddhist-inspired practice of guan (觀; "insight meditation"), as preliminaries for attaining and realizing the Dao.

The text is divided into nine sections (論; lun; "essays; discourses", describing the consecutive steps toward attaining purification and longevity. Some editions only have the first two.

1. "On the Five Sprouts" (五牙論; Wuya lun). The Five Sprouts are the qi essential energies of the wuxing and the five directions. Adepts ingest them, while swallowing saliva and reciting invocations, with the help of visualization, gradually substituting them for a regular diet.
2. "On the Ingestion of Breath" (服氣論; Fuqi lun). Several methods are given to become independent of ordinary breathing, adepts first absorb qi as breath, then guide it internally, and store it in their inner organs.
3. "On daoyin" (導引論; Daoyin lun). Gymnastics or daoyin (literally "exercises for guiding [energy] and stretching [the body]"), should always complement the absorption of qi. They frequently emulate the movements of animals, serve to make the body supple, harmonize the inner energies, stimulate blood circulation, and expel diseases. Gymnastics should always be followed by self-massage.
4. "On Talismanic Water" (符水論; Fushui lun). Daoist talismans are sacred characters written on paper, which is burnt and the ashes dissolved in water, finally ingested by the adepts. Talisman water is commonly used to avoid hunger and thirst when fasting.
5. "On Taking Drugs" (服藥論; Fuyao lun). This section warns against the dangers of prolonged abstention from normal food, especially the Five Grains, which are replaced by drugs containing qi. Several prescriptions are given to strengthen adepts beginning qi absorption when they are weakened by the radical changes in diet.
6. "On Complying with Prohibitions" (慎忌論; Shenji lun). Practitioners should maintain balance between the qi in the world and in the body, otherwise they can be harmed. During the practice of qi absorption, one should avoid exerting the body and any intense emotional states.
7. "On the Five Viscera" (五臟論; Wuzang lun). Relying heavily on the medical classic Huangdi neijing, this is a physiological description of Five Viscera/Orbs, and their correspondences with the Five Planets and Five Sacred Mountains.
8. "On Healing Disease through Ingestion of Breath" (服氣療病論; Fuqi liaobing lun). Diseases, resulting from bad energy circulation, hinder progress. There are specific exercises to heal them, massages or gymnastics cure external problems, while qi absorption heals diseases affecting the internal organs.
9. "On the Symptoms of Diseases" (病候論; Binghou lun). Prior to proper taixi practice even latent diseases must be eliminated. Methods are thus given to diagnose harmful tendencies at an early stage.

The second section is the longest one and of central importance to embryonic breathing. Adepts begin by absorbing the above Taiqing xingqi fu (太清行氣符; "Great Clarity Talisman for [Facilitating] Qi Circulation"), which enables one to gradually abstain from eating grains. They then ingest qi by visualizing the first rays of the rising sun, guide it through the body and viscera, until they can permanently "retain the qi". Sima Chengzhen points out that when one begins abstaining from foods and survives only by ingesting qi breath (and repeats this warning for taking drugs), the immediate effect will be undergoing a phase of weakening and decay, but eventually strength returns all illnesses vanish. Only after nine years of further practice will an adept rightfully be called a zhenren ("Realized One; Perfected Person").

=== Zhuzhen shengtai shenyong jue ===
The Zhuzhen shengtai shenyong jue (諸真聖胎神用訣; "Instructions of the Perfected Person on the Divine Operation of the Sacred Embryo") text attributes embryonic breathing methods to divinities like Laozi and Lishan Laomu; to semilegendary characters such as Bodhidharma, Zhang Guolao, Guiguzi, and Liu Haichan; to historical characters like Ge Hong and Chen Tuan; and to female adepts like He Xiangu.

=== Taixi koujue ===
The preface to the Tang-era Taixi koujue (胎息口訣; "Oral Explanation of Embryonic Respiration") abundantly explains the central role of emulating the fetus, navel, and belly.

That which is in the womb is called foetus, that which has been born is called child. As long as the foetus is in the abdomen of the mother, its mouth is filled with a kind of mud [口含泥土; kouhan nitu], and respiration [喘息; chuan xi] does not penetrate there; it is through the navel (and the umbilical cord) that it receives (lit. 嚥; yan "swallows") the [qi], and the nourishment for its bodily form. Thus it is that it arrives at its completion. Hence we know that the umbilicus [臍; qi] is the 'gate of destiny' [命門; mingmen]. Most babies, if they are alive at birth, fail for a short time to breathe in (the external air), but when the umbilical cord [臍帶; qidai] near the belly, is dipped into warm water three to five times, the infant 'resuscitates' (and breathes). So indeed we know that the umbilicus is the 'gate of destiny', no mistake about it. All those who wish to practise the Tao of reversion [修道; xiudao] and to attain embryonic respiration must first know the source and origin of this, then they can do it themselves, breathing like the foetus in the mother's abdomen. Hence the name (of the technique). It is in reverting to the origin [反本; fanben] and regenerating the primary vitalities [還元; huanyuan] that old age can be chased away, and that one can return to the state of the foetus. Truly there is a point in this (exercise). Softly, gently, without holding the breath, that is the way to bring about the germination of the Tao of immortality.

This all fitted together very reasonably. Understanding that the mammalian embryo "breathes" through the placenta and the maternal circulation as well as gaining its nourishment, its food materials, through the same route, was an "excellent piece of early biological observation, as also the awareness of the occlusion of the foetal intestinal tract by the meconium". Adepts who would recreate in themselves into the youthful perfection of the embryonic tissues must also cease mouth breathing. "The subsequent insistence on the swallowing of saliva was also reasonable, as it could help to re-create the aquatic environment of the mammalian foetus".

=== Songshan Taiwu Xiansheng Qi Jing ===
Li Fengshi's (李奉時) late 8th-century Songshan Taiwu Xiansheng Qi Jing (嵩山太無先生氣經; "Mr. Grand-Nothingness of Sung Mountain's Manual of Qi [Circulation]") stresses the importance of oral tradition.

The most important techniques of Taoism are not to be found in the books but rather in the instructions orally transmitted. The procedures of absorbing the [qi] described in the two Manuals of the Yellow Courts, with those called the "five ya ["sprouts"]" [五牙; wuya] and the "six mou" [六戊; liumo] all have to do only with the external [qi] (of the air). But the [qi] of the external world is hard and powerful; it is not something coming from the interior (of the body), and so no benefit is to be gained by absorbing it. As for the internal [qi], that indeed is what can be called (the breath of) "embryonic respiration" [taixi]; it exists naturally within (the body), it is not something which one has to go outside to borrow. But if one does not obtain the personal explanations of an enlightened teacher, all one's efforts will be but labour and sorrow, and one will never succeed in one's objective.

The contents of this work can be grouped under three headings: respiratory practices, dietary regimens and general recommendations, and the theory of Embryonic Breathing.

=== Taiqing wanglao fuqi koujue ===
According to the Taiqing wanglao fuqi koujue (太清王老服氣口訣; "The Venerable Wang's Instructions for Absorbing Qi, a Taiqing Scripture"):

There were two ways of making it circulate [運氣; yunqi]. Concentrating the will to direct it to a particular place, such as the brain, or the site of some local malady, was termed [行氣; xingqi]. Visualising its flow in thought was "inner vision" [內視; neishi, 內觀; neiguan], differentiated (not very convincingly to us) from ordinary imagination. "Closing one's eyes, one has an inner vision of the five viscera, one can clearly distinguish them, one knows the place of each…"

Based on texts like this, Needham proposes that "anatomical demonstrations may have taken place from time to time in the Taoist temples, and of course all possible parts of the domesticated mammals were eaten, so that there could have been much familiarity with their visceral and vascular system." The passive method of letting the qi take its normal course in circulating, was called lianqi (鍊氣; "casting it"). "Here the analogy with protochemical and metallurgical alchemy was close, as always when the word [lian 鍊 or 煉, "smelt, refine"] appears, and the regions of vital heat doubtless represented the action of the fire upon metals and minerals." Thus, the ancient retention of the breath was not entirely given up, but incorporated into the whole system of employing qi [yongqi 用氣].

Taixi practices continue in modern times. Hsuan Hua (1918-1995), a Chinese monk of Chan Buddhism taught that the external breathing reaches a state of stillness in correct meditation:

A practitioner with sufficient skill does not breathe externally. That external breathing has stopped, but the internal breathing functions. With internal breathing there is no exhalation through the nose or mouth, but all pores on the body are breathing. A person who is breathing internally appears to be dead, but actually he has not died. He does not breathe externally, but the internal breathing has come alive.

== Interpretations ==
Sinologists have varyingly interpreted the principles behind taixi embryonic breathing practices.

Mircea Eliade said Chinese embryonic respiration was not like Indian yogic pranayama, "an exercise preliminary to meditation, nor an auxiliary technique, but sufficed in itself [...] to set in motion and bring to completion a 'mystical physiology'."

According to Jay Sailey, "The philosophical basis of the practice is simple enough: since while a man breathes he is alive, and when he stops breathing his life comes to an end, it is reasoned that is one could increase his intake of air and limit its outgo, then he could increase his lifespan."

Joseph Needham proposes that embryonic breathing techniques likely began with the observation that air was necessary for life, "and perhaps the idea that the more closely one could hug it to oneself the more it would contribute to life—thought of in our terms, it was as if by long retention of the inhaled air one could store an infinite abundance of oxygen. Air was clearly a highly vivifying agent for the mortal body—therefore (by ancient logic) it followed that if only one knew what to do with it the body could be made immortal. After all, before modern physiology, this was not so illogical." He also says this "purposive" apnea (temporary cessation of breathing) was "accompanied by an interesting theory" of taixi "embryonic respiration". However, the Daoist embryonic respiration system involved a physiological fallacy, "no retention of the air could compensate for the absence of a placenta in the adult". This somewhat parallels the Daoist sexual practice of huanjing bunao (還精補腦; "returning the sperm/essence to replenish the brain"), just as the semen was afterwards voided from the bladder by retrograde ejaculation and had no way to ascend to the brain such as the early Daoist physiologists imagined. Nevertheless, the mistaken taixi theory persisted for centuries, and early Daodejing commentators described "reducing respiration to its utmost softness and imperceptibility". Needham concluded that "The circulation-mindedness of traditional Chinese physiological thought, so much in advance of the rest of the world, however archaic in form" is always worth emphasizing."

== See also ==
- Anapanasati, mindfulness of breathing in Buddhist meditation
- Inedia, or breatharianism claims that a person can live without consuming food, and sometimes water
- Kumbhaka, breath retention in pranayama yoga
- Liu Zi Jue, Qigong breathing exercises with Six Healing Sounds
- Womb Realm, Mandala of the Five Tathāgatas
