= Qingjing Jing =

Tang dynasty Taoist text

The Qingjing Jing (simplified Chinese: 清静经; traditional Chinese: 清靜經; pinyin: Qīngjìng Jīng; Wade–Giles: Ch'ing Ching Ching; lit. 'Classic of Clarity/Purity and Stillness/Tranquility') is an anonymous Tang dynasty Taoist classic that combines philosophical themes from the Tao Te Ching with the logical presentation of Buddhist texts and a literary form reminiscent of the Heart Sutra. It instructs students of the Tao to practice the elimination of desire in order to cultivate spiritual purity and stillness.

== Title ==
The Qingjing jing title combines qing 清 "pure; clean; clear; fresh; cool; distinct; clarified; quiet; peaceful", jing 靜 "still; motionless; static; silent; quiet; peaceful; calm; tranquil", and jing 經 "(fabric) warp; scripture; canon; classic".

The first Chinese character qing 淸 has the "water" radical 氵 and a qing 青 "green" phonetic element. The second character jing 靜 has the "green" radical 青 and a zheng 爭 "struggle" phonetic, and was anciently a variant Chinese character for jing 淨 "clean; pure; complete; only", which has the "water" radical and this zheng phonetic. Qingjing could interchangeably be written 清靜 or 清淨, for instance, the Daoist concept qingjing wuwei 清靜無為 or 清凈無為 "quiet and non-action; discard all desires and worries from one's mind". Chinese Buddhism used qingjing 清淨 to translate Sanskrit parishuddhi or Pali vishuddhi "complete purification; free from defilement" (cf. vishudda). Kunio Miura explains:

Whereas Chinese Buddhism always used the compound qingjing 清淨 (clarity and purity) rather than qingjing 清靜 (clarity and quiescence), Taoism uses both interchangeably. When qingjing 清淨 (clarity and purity) is used, however, there is ample room for considering a Buddhist influence.

— Miura (2007), p. 800

In Standard Chinese usage, qingjing 清靜 means "quiet; tranquil; serene (surroundings, etc.)" and qingjing 清淨 means "tranquil; clean and pure; (Buddhism) purified of defiling illusion, not bothered by material concerns".

English translations of the Qingjing jing title include:

- "Classic of Purity", tr. Legge (1891)
- "Scripture of Purity and Tranquility", tr. Kohn (1993)
- "Scripture on Clarity and Tranquility", tr. Despeux & Kohn (2003)
- "Scripture on Clarity and Stillness", tr. Komjathy (2004)
- "Scripture of Purity and Stillness", tr. Miller (2006)
- "Scripture of Clarity and Quiescence", tr. Kohn (2007)

== Overview and origin ==
The Qingjing Jing is a short, mostly-versified text comprising some 390 Chinese characters in 90 verses. It is widely read, has numerous commentaries, and is one of the most important texts in the Taoist religion.

Two passages of the Qingjing Jing are attributed to Laozi, with the honorific "Lord Lao" (老君, see Three Pure Ones). This has led many traditional sources to attribute authorship of the entire text to Laozi, so the text exists under a variety of honorific titles that link it to him. Scholars believe the received text dates from around the middle Tang dynasty (618–907 CE).

The oldest extant commentary is by Du Guangting (杜光庭, 850-933 CE), a prolific editor of Daoist texts during the late Tang and Five Dynasties period. Du says prior to being written down by Ge Xuan (164–244 CE), the Qingjing Jing was orally transmitted for generations, supposedly going back to the mythical Queen Mother of the West.

== Versions and commentaries ==
The Daozang "Taoist Canon" includes eight Qingjing jing editions with variant titles. The basic text (CT 620) is the Qingjing miaojing (清靜妙經 "Wondrous Scripture of Clarity and Stillness") or Taishang Laojun shuo chang qingjing miaojing (太上老君說常清靜妙經 "Wondrous Scripture of Constant Clarity and Stillness, as Spoken by the Most High Lord Lao"). Commentaries include those entitled Qingjing jingzhu (清靜經注, CT 755–760) and Qingjing jing songzhu (清靜經頌注, CT 974).

A slightly longer (and "possibly earlier") version of approximately 600 characters is the Qingjing xinjing (清靜心經 "Heart Scripture of Clarity and Stillness") or Taishang Laojun qingjing xinjing (太上老君清靜心經 "Heart Scripture of Clarity and Stillness, as Spoken by the Most High Lord Lao", CT 1169).

During the Song dynasty (960–1260 CE), the Qingjing Jing became popular within the Southern Lineage "Complete Perfection" or Quanzhen School and was interpreted in context with neidan Chinese internal alchemy. For instance, the seventh Quanzhen master Sun Bu'er 孙不二 took Qingjing sanren 清靜散人 "Vagabond of Clarity and Quiescence" as her sobriquet and established the Qingjing Sect. Modern Quanzhen Taoists consider the Qingjing jing a central scripture and regularly chant it in songjing (誦經, "reciting scriptural passages; ritual recitation"). Kohn explains:

The text serves to inspire the active practitioner and believer. It provides an easy handle on the realization of the Tao within the religious life. It is an exhortation to purity and meditation, a warning against bad thoughts and deviant desires. Pious Taoists know this short and rhythmic text by heart.

— Kohn (1993), p. 25

== Contents ==
Although brief, the Qingjing Jing is philosophically complex. It synthesizes Taoist and Buddhist theories of psychology, cosmology, ontology, and teleology.

The Qingjing Jing is described by Komjathy:

An anonymous text probably dating from the 9th century, this is one of a group of Tang-dynasty (618-907) works that could be labeled "Clarity-and-Stillness" literature. Emerging under the influence of Buddhist insight meditation (Vipassanā) and expressing a form of wisdom (zhi 智) based on the practice of observation (guan 觀), the text combines the worldview of the Tao Te Ching 道德經 (Scripture on the Tao and Inner Power) with the practice of Taoist observation and the structure (as well as some content) of the Buddhist Bo Rue Xin Jing 般若心經 (Heart Sutra of Perfect Wisdom; T. 250-57). It emphasizes the dual cultivation of clarity/purity (qing 清) and "stillness/tranquility" (jing 靜).

— Komjathy (2004), p. 47-48

These Taoist keywords are guan 觀 "scrutiny; careful observation; insight meditation; contemplation", qing 清 "clarity; purity; cleanliness", and jing 靜 "stillness; quiet; calm; tranquility". The Tao Te Ching (45, tr. Mair (1990), p. 13) is the locus classicus for qingjing: "Bustling about vanquishes cold, Standing still vanquishes heat. Pure and still, one can put things right everywhere under heaven."

Kohn summarizes the Qingjing jing:

The text first describes the nature of the Tao as divided into Yin and Yang, clear and turbid (qing 清 and zhuo 濁), moving and quiescent (dong 動 and jing 靜), and stresses the importance of the mind in the creation of desires and worldly entanglements. It recommends the practice of observation to counteract this, i.e., the observation of other beings, the self, and the mind, which results in the realization that none of these really exists. The practitioner has reached the observation of emptiness (kongguan 空觀). The latter part of the work reverses direction and outlines the decline from pure spirit to falling into hell: spirit (shen 神) develops consciousness or mind (xin 心), and mind develops greed and attachment toward the myriad beings. Greed then leads to involvement, illusory imagining, and erroneous ways, which trap beings in the chain of rebirth, and they sink deeper into the quagmire of desire, causes them to fall into hell.

— Kohn (2007), p. 801

== Translations ==
The Qingjing jing has been translated into English by Balfour (1894), pp. 70–73, Legge (1891), pp. 247–54, and Kohn (1993), p. 24-29. Wong (1992) translated the Shuijingzi (水精子) commentary.

The following versions of the opening section (verses 1-8 and 9–13, reformatted for consistency) illustrate the translational range:

Lâo the Master said, The Great Tâo has no bodily form, but It produced and nourishes heaven and earth. The Great Tâo has no passions, but It causes the sun and moon to revolve as they do. The Great Tâo has no name, but It effects the growth and maintenance of all things. I do not know its name, but I make an effort, and call It the Tâo.
Now, the Tâo (shows itself in two forms); the Pure and the Turbid, and has (the two conditions of) Motion and Rest. Heaven is pure and earth is turbid; heaven moves and earth is at rest. The masculine is pure and the feminine is turbid; the masculine moves and the feminine is still. The radical (Purity) descended, and the (turbid) issue flowed abroad; and thus all things were produced. The pure is the source of the turbid, and motion is the foundation of rest. If man could always be pure and still, heaven and earth would both revert (to non-existence).

— tr. Legge (1891), p. 249-250

The Great Tao has no form; It brings forth and raises heaven and earth. The Great Tao has no feelings; It regulates the course of the sun and the moon. The Great Tao has no name; It raises and nourishes the myriad beings. I do not know its name – So I call it Tao.
The Tao can be pure or turbid; moving or tranquil. Heaven is pure, earth is turbid; Heaven is moving, earth is tranquil. The male is moving, the female is tranquil. Descending from the origin, Flowing toward the end, The myriad beings are being born. Purity – the source of turbidity, Movement – the root of tranquility. Always be pure and tranquil; Heaven and earth Return to the primordial.

— tr. Kohn (1993), p. 25

== Bibliography ==
- Balfour, Frederic (1894). "The Ch'ing Ching Ching". Taoist Texts: Ethical, Political and Speculative. Trübner and Co. pp. 70–73.
- Despeux, Catherine (2003). Women in Daoism. Translated by Kohn, Livia. Three Pines Press.
- Kohn, Livia (1993). The Taoist Experience. State University of New York Press.
- Kohn, Livia (2007). "Qingjing jing 清靜經 Scripture of Clarity and Quiescence". In Pregadio, Fabrizio (ed.). The Encyclopedia of Taoism. Routledge. pp. 800–801.
- Komjathy, Louis (2002). "Developing Clarity and Stillness: The Scripture for Daily Internal Practice" (PDF). The Dragon's Mouth (Winter 2002/2003): 9–13. Archived from the original (PDF) on 3 February 2007.
- Komjathy, Louis (2004). Daoist Texts in Translation (PDF). Archived from the original (PDF) on 26 May 2005.
- Komjathy, Louis (2008). Handbooks for Daoist Practice, 10 volumes. Hong Kong: Yuen Yuen Institute.
- Legge, James (1962) [1891]. "Khing Käng King, or 'The Classic of Purity'". The Texts of Taoism. Vol. 2. Dover. pp. 247–54.
- Mair, Victor H. (1990). Tao Te Ching: The Classic Book of Integrity and the Way, by Lao Tzu; an entirely new translation based on the recently discovered Ma-wang-tui manuscripts. Bantam Books.
- Miller, James (2006). Chinese Religions in Contemporary Societies. ABC-CLIO.
- Miura, Kunio (2007). "Qingjing 清靜 Clarity and Quiescence". In Pregadio, Fabrizio (ed.). The Encyclopedia of Taoism. Routledge. pp. 799–800.
- Wong, Eva (1992). Cultivating Stillness: A Taoist Manual for Transforming Body and Mind. Shambhala.
