= Ge Chaofu =

Renowned Taoist practitioner of Lingbao School

Ge Chaofu (Chinese: 葛巢甫) is a member of the Chinese Ge family who lived during the 4th and 5th centuries CE. He is best known for writing the Taoist scripture known as The Five Talismans (Wufujing) which forms the basis of the beliefs of the Lingbao School of Taoism. Beyond this, very little is known about Ge Chaofu and his life.

== Life ==
Very little is known about Ge Chaofu beyond his association with the Lingbao School's scriptures. Taoist records indicate that Ge Chaofu was the grandnephew of the famous alchemist Ge Hong, and was the inheritor of the Ge family's alchemical texts through a master disciple transmission system. He was most likely born in Jurong, the ancestral home of the Ge family, sometime in the latter half of the 4th century CE. In the 390s, he researched the books contained in the Ge family library along with Buddhist and Shangqing texts and expanded the five talismans contained within Ge Hong's book the Baopuzi in order to create a new text known as The Five Talismans (Wufujing). In between 397 and 401 CE, Ge Chaofu transmitted this text to two disciples, Xu Lingqi and Ren Yanqing, and thus founded the Lingbao School of Taoism. The year 400 is usually stated as the year in which the Lingbao School was founded, and shortly after this time, the texts had already become very popular. Unfortunately, there are no sources that indicate what happened to Ge Chaofu after the year 401.

== See also ==
- Ge Xuan
- Ge Hong
- Baopuzi
- List of Lingbao texts
