= Ge Xuan =

Chinese Taoist practitioner

- 葛玄
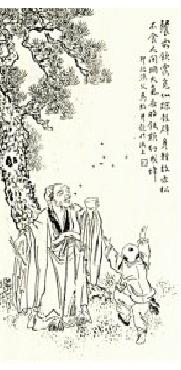
- A Qing dynasty portrait of Ge Xuan
- Born: 164; Linyi, Shandong
- Died: 244 (aged 80)
- Other name: Xiaoxian (孝先)
- Occupation: Daoist healer

Ge Xuan (Note: Also romanized as Ko Hsuan, following Wade–Giles, and Ko Yuen, following Legge.) (164–244), courtesy name Xiaoxian, was a Chinese Taoist practitioner who lived during the eastern Han dynasty (25–220) and Three Kingdoms periods (220–280). He was the ancestor of Ge Hong and a resident of Danyang Commandery in the state of Eastern Wu during the Three Kingdoms period. Ge Xuan's paternal grandnephew, Ge Hong, gave him the title "Ge Xuan Gong", which translates as "Immortal Lord" or "Transcendent Duke". Ge Hong wrote extensively about his great-uncle, and said that some alchemical texts from his Baopuzi originally came from him. Ge Xuan was described by his descendant, Ge Chaofu, as the first recipient of the Lingbao sacred scriptures. He is remembered as a member of the Chinese Ge family and a prominent figure in the early development of Taoism.

== Early life ==
Ge Xuan was associated with a number of Taoist traditions. He belonged to a prominent family, and was considered intelligent. During his early childhood, Ge Xuan was an inquisitive student and read the Confucian classics and commentaries and other philosophical and historical records. Fascinated by the philosophies of Laozi and Zhuangzi, he learned about how the Dao worked in daily life. At age 16, Ge Xuan was well known north of the Yangtze River.

Ge Xuan's parents died when he was 16 years old, beginning his obsession with studying the Dao and how life works. He lived in isolation, in mountains and forests. His secluded environment allowed Ge Xuan to discipline himself mentally, spiritually, and physically. The Dao requires discipline of its followers, since it focuses on achieving longevity or even immortality. Ge Xuan visited Lingyue Mountain, Chicheng Mountain, and Luofu Mountain. He visited noteworthy people, ate Ganoderma lucidum (a type of mushroom), setose thistle (Cirsium setosum) (Note: Pending verification.The specific type of plant remains to be determined, although both are Cardueae, Zhu (术, Atractylodes) and Ji (蓟, Cirsium) may belong to different genera.), ("服饵芝术", Fu Er Zhi Zhu) and practiced self-cultivation.

When he encountered the legendary Zuo Ci, Ge Xuan obtained mythological scriptures such as the Immortals' Book of Liquefied Gold of the Nine Elixirs. When he received this book, Ge Xuan began fasting and followed the commandments laid down by the Ultimate. His subservience enabled him to meander through mountains and over seas, and his ling (靈) helped him conduct exorcisms and heal the sick. Ge Xuan became a healer, offering magical potions which he hoped would confer immortality. Zuo Ci descended to Tiantai Mountain and gave him the Numinous Treasure (36 volumes).

== Career ==
Ge Xuan's grandnephew Ge Hong, an alchemist who wrote the Baopuzi, wrote a biography of Ge Xuan in the Biographies of Divine Immortals (Shenxian Zhuan). In his biography, Ge Hong wrote that Ge Xuan was summoned to the court of Eastern Wu ruler Sun Quan. A flotilla of boats capsized, and a number of people died. Many people thought that Ge Xuan was one of the casualties, but he returned a few days later and apologized for his absence. He said that he had been detained by the water deity, Wu Zixu, remaining submerged by holding his breath with his mastery of embryonic breathing (胎息 tāixī) and his ability to manipulate wind, rain, and rivers.

Many Mahayana Buddhists consider Ge Xuan a founder of Daoism with Zhang Daoling. Ge Hong wrote that Ge Xuan was part of the lineage of alchemical texts – including Scripture of Great Clarity (Taiqing Jing), Scripture of the Nine Elixirs (Jiudan Jing), and Scripture of the Golden Fluid (Jinye Jing) – which he transmitted to Ge Hong; Ge Xuan, however, did not concoct any elixirs himself. According to Ge Chaofu, Ge Hong's grandnephew, (Note: Ge Chaofu founded the Lingbao School of Daoism.) Ge Xuan received the Lingbao scriptures from the deities. Ge Xuan's descendants gave him the title of "Transcendent Duke of the Left of the Great Ultimate" (Taiji Zuo Xian Gong) because of his beliefs. He remained an important figure in Daoism until the Middle Ages, receiving posthumous titles from emperors.

== Retirement ==
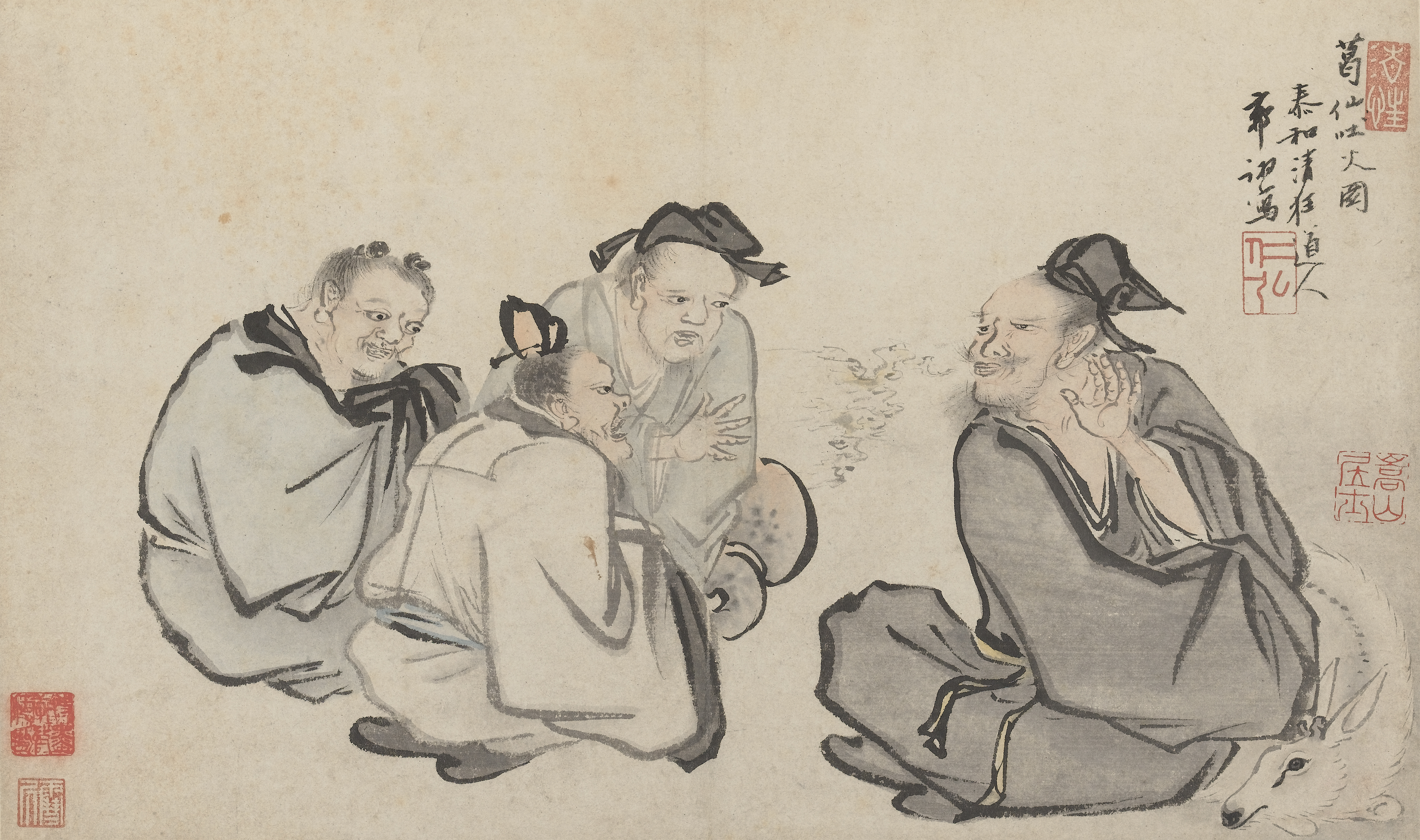
Ge Xuan breathing fire, depicted in a 1503 painting by Guo Xu

Ge Xuan became a master of esoterica, excelling at breathing exercises. These exercises were dependent on a diet which avoided grains and alcohol. A number of legends are part of Ge Xuan's hagiography, the most common of which concern his supernatural gifts. Bilocation was one; during his parties, he would reportedly often talk with some of his guests and welcome (or send others off) at the same time. Ge Xuan also reportedly had the gift of telekinesis. He could point at an object and make it move (or disappear), and cause unseen objects to appear; at one party, drinking cups arrived and filled themselves with liquor. He could also reportedly hover three or four feet above the ground and walk in the air.

In later life, one of Ge Xuan's responsibilities was to entertain the emperor. When he tired of this, he told his disciple Zhang Gong that he would leave the mortal world at noon on August 11. Ge Xuan prepared for his transcendence by wearing his finest clothing and lying down on his bed. After some time, Zhang Gong saw that his master's face still had color but he was no longer breathing. Over the next three days and nights, he carried out the after-death rituals. At midnight on the third night, a wind blew through Ge Xuan's room and extinguished the candles. When they were relit his body was gone, leaving only his clothes with the waistband still tied. The next day, it was learned that the wind had only blown through Ge Xuan's room.

== Literary works ==
=== Classic of Purity ===
Ge Xuan reportedly compiled the Classic of Purity (Qingjing Jing), (Note: As Khing Kang King (following Legge), this book was published in a poetic paraphrase by Aleister Crowley, who declared himself a reincarnation of "Ko Yuen".) in which he wrote, "The Inner Spirit of people loves purity, but the mind of people is often rebellious". People cannot achieve purity because their minds are not clear and their desires are unrestrained. Ge Xuan wrote that desires make individuals selfish and dishonest; the mind creates illusions, which cause suffering.

=== Other texts ===
Ge Xuan reportedly received texts from Zuo Yuanfang, who received them from a divine man who came to him while he was practicing purification of thought (靜思 jìngsī) on Mount Tianzhu. He passed the Book of The Nine Elixirs to his great-nephew, Ge Hong. The Lingbao account for Ge Xuan endured in an anonymous preface written during the Six Dynasties to the Heshang Gong-annotated version of the Dao De Jing; the "Preface and Secret Instructions" are attributed to him. According to the Biography of Transcendent Duke Ge of the Great Ultimate, written by Zhu Chuo in 1377, nearly all early Dao literature may be traced to Ge Xuan.

Ge Xuan was recognized as the Supreme Immortal when his scripts were passed to Ge Hong. Although Ge Hong began composing the Classic of the Sacred Jewel (Lingbao Jing) around 379 CE, he said that they had been first revealed to Ge Xuan. Ge Xuan is known as "the Perfect Sovereign and Protector", in correspondence with the Dao, and the "Immortal Elder Ge of the Supreme Ultimate".

== See also ==
- Lists of people of the Three Kingdoms

== Bibliography ==
- Bokenkamp, Stephen (2008). "Ge Xuan". In Pregadio, Fabrizio (ed.). The Encyclopedia of Taoism. London: Routledge. pp. 444–445.
- Campany, Robert Ford (2002). To Live as Long as Heaven and Earth: A Translation and Study of Ge Hong's Traditions of Divine Transcendents. California: University of California Press.
- Campany, Robert Ford (2005). "Two Religious Thinkers of the Early Eastern Jin: Gan Bao and Ge Hong in Multiple Contexts". Asia Major. 18 (1): 175–224. ISSN 0004-4482. JSTOR 41649900.
- Crowley, Aleister (2011). Demian, Max (ed.). The Qingjing Jing of Ge Xuan, "The Classic of Purity": A Poetic Paraphrase by Aleister Crowley based on the translation of James Legge. USA: Chroniker Press. ISBN 9781304887283.
- Doniger, Wendy (1999). Merriam-Webster's Encyclopedia of World Religions: An A-Z Guide to the World's Religions. Merriam-Webster.
- Kohn, Livia (2000). Daoism Handbook. BRILL.
- Kohn, Livia (1993). The Taoist Experience: An Anthology. SUNY Press.
- Kohn, Livia (2004). The Daoist Monastic Manual. New York: Oxford University Press.
- Robinet, Isabelle (1997). Taoism: The Growth of a Religion. Stanford, California: Stanford University Press.
- Sheng, Jiang. "Ge Xuan (Immortal Elder Ge)." Taoist Culture and Information Centre. Retrieved 25 Oct. 2008. http://eng.taoism.org.hk/general-daoism/eminent-philosophers-accomplished-daoists/pg1-4-9.htm
- Xuan, Ge. "The Classic of Purity." The Classic of Purity. Retrieved 23 Oct. 2008 http://www.theosophical.ca/ClassicPurity.htm
