= Lingbao School =

Daoist school

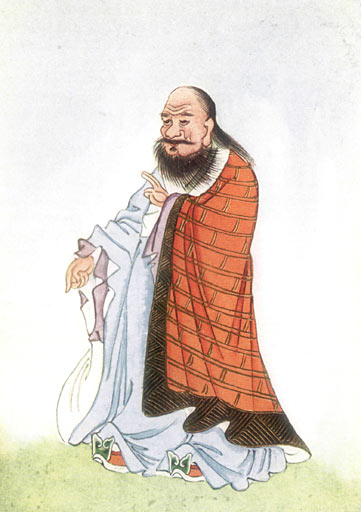
Laozi, one of the most important gods in Lingbao Daoism

The Lingbao School (simplified Chinese: 灵宝派; traditional Chinese: 靈寶派; pinyin: Líng Bǎo Pài), also known as the School of the Sacred Jewel or the School of Numinous Treasure, was an important Daoist school that emerged in China in between the Jin dynasty and the Liu Song dynasty in the early fifth century CE. It lasted for about two hundred years until it was absorbed into the Shangqing and Zhengyi currents during the Tang dynasty. The Lingbao School is a synthesis of religious ideas based on Shangqing texts, the rituals of the Celestial Masters, and Buddhist practices.

The Lingbao School borrowed many concepts from Buddhism, including the concept of reincarnation, and also some cosmological elements. Although reincarnation was an important concept in the Lingbao School, the earlier Daoist belief in attaining immortality remained. The school's pantheon is similar to Shangqing and Celestial Master Daoism, with one of its most important gods being the deified form of Laozi. Other gods also existed, some of whom were in charge of preparing spirits for reincarnation. Lingbao ritual was initially an individual practice, but later went through a transformation that put more emphasis on collective rites. The most important scripture in the Lingbao School is known as the Five Talismans (Wufujing), which was compiled by Ge Chaofu and based on Ge Hong's earlier alchemical works.

Although Lingbao no longer exists as a distinct movement, it has left influences on all subsequent branches of Taoism. The "yinyang masters" popular in contemporary northern China are defined as Zhengyi Taoist priests following the Lingbao scriptural tradition.

== History ==
The Lingbao School began in around 400 CE when the Lingbao scriptures were revealed to Ge Chaofu, the grandnephew of Ge Hong. Ge Chaofu claimed that the scriptures came to him in a line of transmission going back to Ge Hong's great-uncle, Ge Xuan (164–244). Ge Chaofu transmitted the scriptures to two of his disciples, and the scriptures quickly gained immense popularity. In 471, Lu Xiujing (406–477) compiled a catalogue of all the Lingbao texts, and also was responsible for reorganizing and standardizing Lingbao ritual. This organization of texts and ritual provided a solid foundation on which the Lingbao School prospered in the subsequent centuries. During the Tang dynasty, the influence of the Lingbao School declined and another school of Daoism, the Shangqing School, became prominent. Borrowing many Lingbao practices, it was well accepted by the aristocracy and established an influence in court.

== Beliefs ==
Some early Lingbao scriptures borrowed so many Buddhist terminological, stylistic and conceptual elements that Zürcher describes them as "Buddho-Taoist hybrids".

=== Rebirth ===
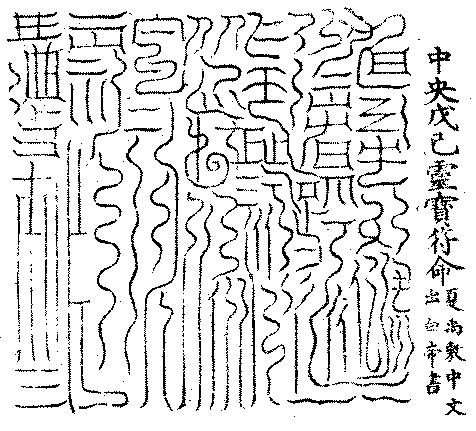
A Daoist talisman from the Lingbao scriptures

Many Lingbao beliefs are borrowed from Buddhism. The names of the many different deities and heavens were often given titles based on phonetic transcriptions of Sanskrit. Many Sanskrit terms were borrowed phonetically, but given completely different meanings. One significant concept borrowed from Buddhism was that of reincarnation.

Both Buddhism and the Lingbao School share the idea of the Five Paths of Rebirth (Gati). People were reborn into earth prisons, as a hungry ghost, as an animal, as a man, or as a celestial being. After death, the body would be alchemically refined in the Palace of Supreme Darkness located in the north, and the Southern Palace in the south. The transmutation of the body consisted of two steps; the yin components of the person were refined in the Palace of Supreme Darkness, followed by the yang components in the Southern Palace. The Lingbao concept of rebirth is a Chinese adaptation of Buddhism, mixing traditional Chinese concepts with newly arrived Buddhist ideas.

=== Cosmology ===
Lingbao cosmology also borrows heavily from Buddhism. Unlike previous Daoist cosmological systems which were divided into four to nine regions, Lingbao cosmology supposed that there were ten regions, an idea borrowed from Buddhism. In addition to the cosmological regions, there were 32 heavens divided into four sectors, each with eight heavens that were placed horizontally on the periphery of the celestial disc. Each of the four sectors was ruled by an emperor and populated by denizens of an earlier cosmic age (kalpa). Like Buddhism, the heavens were divided into the "three worlds" of desire, form, and formlessness. Lingbao cosmology deviated from Buddhist beliefs by proposing that the heavens rotated around a huge mountain known as the Jade Capital, which was the residence of the Celestial Worthy, the Daoist version of the Buddha, and the primordial deity.

Certain traditional Daoist ideas were retained in Lingbao cosmology, such as the idea that the world originated from a type of primordial qi known as yuanqi, and then was divided into heaven and earth. Furthermore, the yuanqi is subdivided into three types of qi that correspond to three deities: the lords of the Celestial Treasure, of the Sacred Treasure and of the Divine Treasure. These three deities later introduced the teachings of the Dongzhen (Perfect Grotto), the Dongxuan (Mysterious Grotto), and of the Dongshen (Divine Grotto). These three teachings form the basis for the later classification of texts in the Daozang.

Apocalyptic notions that appeared in Shangqing Daoism were first developed fully by the Lingbao School. Lingbao cosmology supposed that time was divided into cosmic cycles, which correlated with the Five Phases. At the end of a cosmic era, the god of the colour associated with that era would descend onto earth and reveal a teaching that would save a fixed number of people from death. There were two types of cosmic eras, short ones that were characterized by an excess of yin energy, and long ones that were characterized by an excess of yang energy. At the end of a short cosmic era, the moon was prophesied to produce a flood that would erode the mountains, renew the qi of the universe, and change the rankings of the members of the celestial bureaucracy. At the end of a long cosmic era, evil creatures were unleashed, heaven and earth were turned upside down, and metals and stones melted together. The people who followed the correct teaching revealed by the god of the colour would be gathered up by the Queen Mother of the West and transported to a "land of bliss" that would not be affected by the apocalypse.

=== Pantheon ===
In addition to borrowing deities from the Celestial Masters and the Shangqing School, the Lingbao School also developed its own gods. The supreme god of Lingbao Daoists is known as the Yuanshi Tianzun or the Celestial Worthy of the Original Beginning, who played a similar role to the deified Laozi in the Celestial Masters. According to the scriptures, this god went through a series of kalpa cycles that were given names similar to dynastic names, until emerging at the beginning of the Kaihuang period. The next most important god was Laojun, the deified form of Laozi, who was the Celestial Worthy's chief disciple. Below these two main gods in the celestial hierarchy were those deities associated with the Southern Palace, where spirits went after death to prepare for rebirth. The head of this group of gods was known as the Perfected of the Southern Extremities. Beneath him was the Director of the Equerry, who was in charge of the life records of the spirits, and Lord Han, who controlled Fengdu, the city of the dead. Below these principal gods in the Lingbao hierarchy were other deities such as the Five Old Men, the Dragon Kings, and the Demon Kings.

Deities were present not only in the heavens, but also in the human body itself. They were responsible for maintaining the body's five viscera, guarding the registers of life, and regulating the souls. There were five internal deities that were particularly important in Lingbao Daoism. The Great Unity lived in the head, along with Lordling and White Prime, who could descend into the liver and lungs. The Director of Destinies lived in the heart and sexual organs, and finally, the Peach Child lived in the lower dantian. Normally these deities resided in the heavens, but they could be activated by scriptural recitations to descend into the body.

== Practices ==
=== Immortality techniques ===
Despite a belief in reincarnation, the Lingbao School maintained the traditional Daoist idea that certain techniques could allow an adherent to achieve immortality. One technique was to ingest the essence of the sun and the moon. Practitioners would expose themselves to the celestial bodies at certain times of the month. Closing their eyes, they would visualize that the essences would solidify and enter their bodies. Once in the body, the sun's essence was matched to the heart and visualized as red, while the moon's was matched with the kidneys and seen as black. Besides interior meditation practices, immortality could be achieved through the ingestion of potions or talismans.

=== Rituals ===
Early Lingbao ritual was mostly done on an individual basis, either in a meditation chamber, or the courtyard of a house. Early practitioners were not professional priests, but rather 'students of the Dao'. Later on, as the Lingbao movement developed religious institutions and an established clergy, ritual practice became more of a communal rite.

Lingbao ritual shares a great deal with ritual in other Daoist traditions. Like other traditions, Lingbao rituals had a theatrical quality that involved accompanying music, dances, and chants. Lingbao Daoism also shared the multidimensional aspect of Daoist ritual, meaning that it was carried on at several different levels simultaneously. For example, while a ritual was being performed, the priest would repeat the ritual within himself through interior meditation.

There are three categories of ritual in Lingbao Daoism. The first is known as the heavenly Golden Register of Rituals, and is carried out to prevent natural disasters. During the Tang dynasty, this ritual was carried out in honour of the imperial family, but later it could be performed by anyone. The earthly Yellow Register ritual was performed to ensure the dead was at rest. The final type of ritual, which has not survived, was the human Jade Register, which was performed to ensure the salvation of mankind. Of the rituals that have survived, the Golden Register has assumed the role of the Jade register, ensuring salvation and preventing bad weather.

== Canon ==
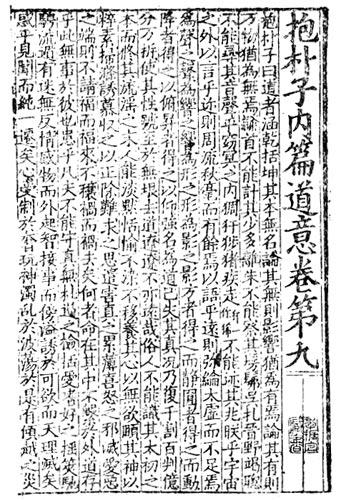
A page from the Baopuzi, on which the Lingbao scriptures are based

Lingbao scriptures arose as a direct result of the success of earlier Shangqing texts. Lingbao scriptures are all based on a text known as the Text of the Five Talismans (Wufujing), which was compiled by Ge Chaofu between 397 and 402 and borrowed from the work of Ge Hong, his great uncle. Being the most ancient Lingbao text, the Five Talismans provided the framework of the remainder of the Lingbao canon, which was based on the five directions. Because all Lingbao texts descended from the Five Talismans, it was believed that they had been revealed to Ge Xuan, presumably the original owner of the Five Talismans. Ge Xuan is purported to have transmitted the Lingbao texts first to his disciple Zheng Siyuan, who then transmitted it to Ge's grandnephew Ge Hong (284–364), who is well known for his alchemical innovations. The claim that the Lingbao texts derive from Ge Xuan, however, was likely a way of legitimizing them through the exaggeration of their antiquity. In reality, they were likely assembled by Ge Chaofu himself. Within a few years of the texts' dissemination, they had become extremely popular.

The canon itself is a mix of previous Daoist traditions, combining features from the Shangqing School and the Celestial Masters, along with other ancient texts and even some Buddhist ideas. The two most important texts of the canon besides the Wufujing are the Red Book of Five Writings (Chi shu wupian) and the Scripture of Upper Chapters on Limitless Salvation (Wuliang Duren Shangpin). According to Lu Xiujing, who edited the Lingbao Canon, there were a total of 34 texts in the canon, of which three have been lost.

== Legacy ==
While the Lingbao school did not survive as a distinct entity, its ritual apparatus did, and it forms the basis for present-day Daoist ritual practice. In addition, many of the innovations introduced by the Lingbao School have survived to the present, including its division of the Daozang into three sections corresponding to different teachings, with the Dongzhen corresponding to the Shangqing School, the Dongxuan to the Lingbao School, and the Dongshen to the Sanhuang teaching. The integration of Buddhism within Lingbao practices and beliefs ensured that Buddhist elements would remain an important aspect of later Daoism, and also aided in integrating Buddhism into all levels of society in China.
