= Ge Hong =

4th-century Chinese philosopher and physician

- 葛洪
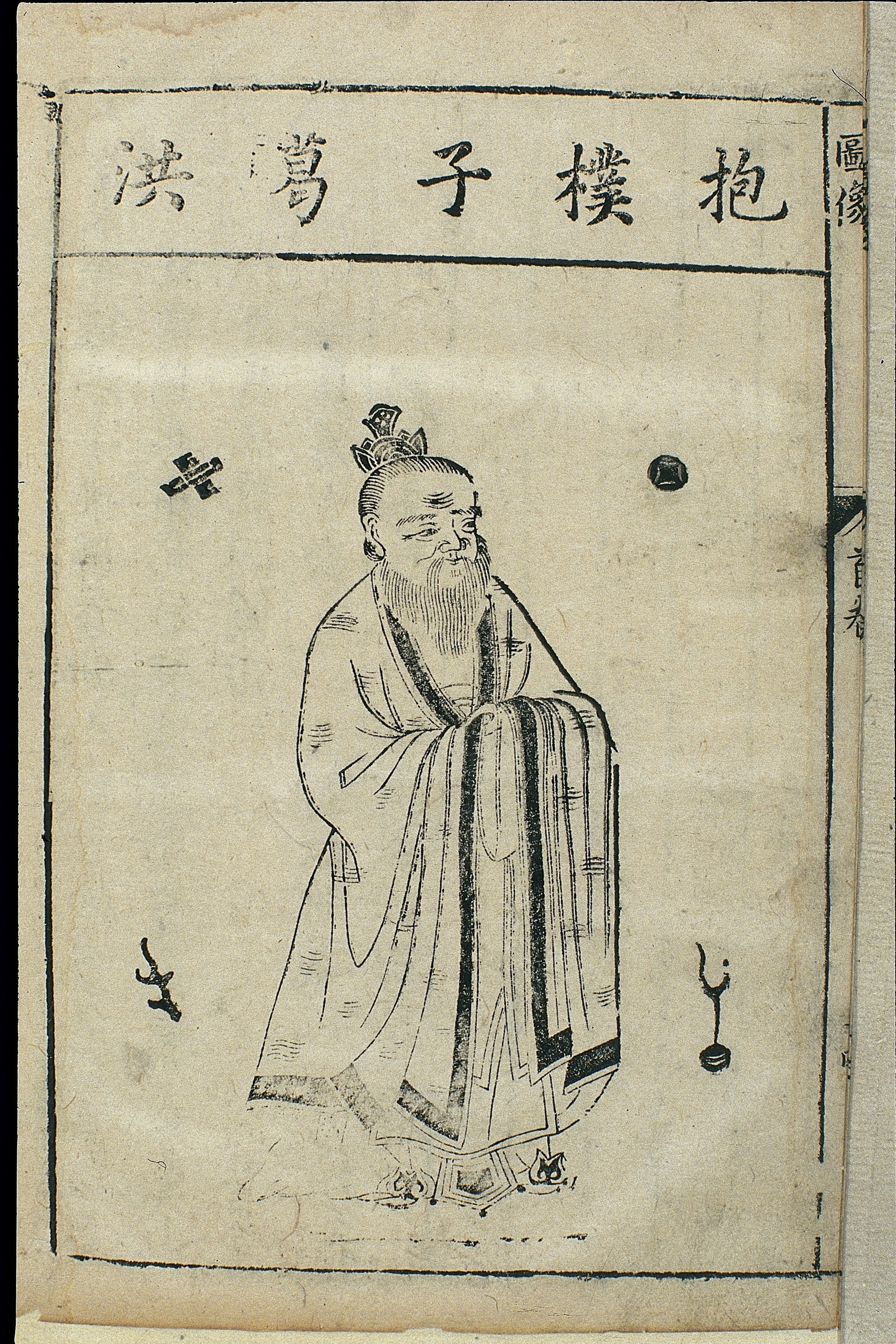
- Ge Hong as depicted by Gan Bozong, woodcut print, Tang dynasty (618–907)
- Born: 283; Jurong Province, Jin Empire
- Died: 343 or 364
- Other names: Zhichuan (稚川), Baopuzi (抱朴子)

Chinese name
- Simplified Chinese: 葛洪
- Traditional Chinese: 葛洪
Transcriptions
Standard Mandarin
- Hanyu Pinyin: Gé hóng

Ge Hong (Chinese: 葛洪; pinyin: Gě Hóng; Wade–Giles: Ko Hung; b. 283 – d. 343 or 364), courtesy name Zhichuan (稚川), was a Chinese linguist, philosopher, physician, politician, and writer during the Eastern Jin dynasty. He was the author of Essays on Chinese Characters, the Baopuzi, the Emergency Formulae at an Elbow's Length, among others. He was the originator of first aid in traditional Chinese medicine and influenced later generations.

He also took on the name Baopuzi (Chinese: 抱朴子), with which translates literally as 'embracing simplicity'—a reflection of his commitment to fundamental virtues, unadorned truth, and detachment from material temptations.

== Early life ==
Ge Hong was born near Jurong county in AD 283, as the third son into a well-established family originally from Eastern Wu.

His ancestor Ge Xi (葛奚) once served in the high ranking position of Dahonglu (大鸿胪) in Eastern Wu. His great-uncle was Ge Xuan (葛玄) (also known as Ge Xianweng), an alchemist during the Three Kingdoms period. He studied alchemy and Taoism with Zuo Ci.

His father, Ge Ti (葛悌), served as the prefect of Shaoling (邵陵) after the nation entered the Jin Dynasty. He died when Ge Hong was 13 and his family went into decline. Ge had no inheritance and took up farming at an early age. As the family library had been destroyed in the war, Ge borrowed books from friends, selling firewood to make money for buying paper and writing brushes so he could copy the books.

Ge Hong is of an ascetic nature and did not like honor and gain. He was not especially fond of classic literature, but rather especially appreciated the guidance of the divine. Ge Hong studied Chinese alchemy under Ge Xuan's disciple Zheng Yin (郑隐).

== Career ==
By Ge Hong's time, although the family was declining, he was employed in numerous high ranking positions within the bureaucracy of the time.

In his public service role as an official, he was often asked to appraise his friends and acquaintances as possible candidates for government office positions and was also chosen to perform military service. However, he was unhappy with his life as an official and general. Although he never rejected Confucianism, he grew interested in Taoist cultivation and elixirs to achieve the spiritual freedoms of Taoist Immortality.

In the second year of Tai'an in the Western Jin Dynasty (AD 303), Ge Hong was promoted due to his contributions in calming the peasant uprising led by Shi Bing in Yangzhou.

In the first year of Guangxi (AD 306), Ji Han (嵇含), the newly promoted governor of Guangzhou, recommended Ge Hong to join the ranks as an army official. Ge Hong first went to Guangzhou, but after Ji Han was killed, he went to Mount Luofu to live in seclusion. There, he gathered herbal medicine, refined elixirs, and documented numerous cases of illness.

Later, Ge Hong became a disciple of Bao Liang (鲍靓), then prefect of Nanhai, from whom he learned alchemy and received the Sanhuangjing. He also married Bao Liang's daughter Bao Gu, who excelled in the techniques of moxibustion.

In the second year of Jianxing of Emperor Min (AD 313), Ge Hong returned to his hometown, but still lived in seclusion and did not work as an official. In the first year of Jianwu of Emperor Yuan of Jin (AD 317), the Inner and Outer Chapters of Baopuzi were written.

In the first year of Xianhe (AD 326), he was called by Wang Dao to serve as under the position of "Zhubo" (主簿), later promoted to "consulting general" (咨议将军).

In the 7th year of Xianhe, he heard that Jiaozhi County (present-day Vietnam) produced cinnabar, and asked Emperor Cheng to serve as the magistrate of Gouti (句屚) (near present-era Hà Sơn Bình province). After receiving the Emperor's consent, his family traveled south. When he arrived in Guangzhou, he was asked to remain, so Ge Hong once again lived in seclusion in Mount Luofu to refine elixirs.

His autobiography was the last part of his collected writings. Referring to his years as an official in Guangzhou, he wrote that "Honor and status, are like guests yet are not common goods, as they leave they cannot be kept."

== Impact ==
Hong's main contributions were in Chinese alchemy and medicine, and also as a religious scholar integrating Confucianism and Taoism. Ge Hong questioned ancient writings and was against the traditionalism of the time, whereby older writings were valued while newer ideas were less respected, and instead emphasized innovation and methods which involved experimentation and results. This was especially the case in his work in medicine and alchemy. In medical practice, Ge Hong read a large number of medical books in his analysis and research. He summarized treatment experience and collected knowledge from folk treatments, compiling works such as the hundred-scrolled book Yuhanfang (玉函方).

In his book Emergency Formulae at an Elbow's Length (肘后备急方), he suggested treating rabies patients by applying the brain matter of rabid dogs onto the bite wound, and extractions from the plant Artemisia annua to treat malaria. The latter method inspired the works of the Chinese malariologist and pharmaceutical chemist Tu Youyou, which led to the discovery of artemisinin extracted from the same plant, part of the 2015 Nobel Prize in Physiology or Medicine.

Hong was knowledgeable about chemistry. He documented the redox reaction of mercury. He also discovered that chalcanthite (copper sulfate pentahydrate) can be transformed to a golden bronze-like alloy, using the redox reaction involving copper sulfate and iron.

There is a hall in Xiaolingfeng Temple (小灵峰寺) in Ningbo, in which enshrines a statue of Ge Hong. In the second year of Xianhe (AD 327), Hong came here to distill elixirs. When he lived in seclusion in the Lingfeng peaks (in the Yandang Mountains) nearby, a plague occurred, and he practiced medicine to help locals.

== See also ==
- Bao Gu
- Ge Chaofu
- Ge Xuan
- Hua Tuo
