= Frederic H. Balfour =

British expatriate editor, essayist, author, and sinologist

Frederic Henry Balfour (1846 – 27 May 1909) was a British expatriate editor, essayist, author, and sinologist, living in Shanghai during the Victorian era. He is most notable for his translation of the Tao Te Ching. Many of these translations appeared in his 1884 Taoist Texts: Ethical, Political and Speculative, also known simply as Taoist Texts.

== Sinology ==
The Chinese character 道 Tao or Dao in Taoism

Comparing translations of the same passages in the Tao Te Ching by two sinologists, separated by a century, shows the tendency away from literal exposition in favor of figurative, artistic prose in Taoist studies.

- Frederic H. Balfour, 1884:

Although the Great Principle of Nature – Tao – has no form, it brought forth and nourishes Heaven and Earth; though it has no passions, it causes the Sun and Moon to revolve; though it has no name, it produces the growth and nurture of all things. As I do not know its name, I am compelled to call it simply, Tao.

Now this Principle includes the pure and the turbid; the active and the motionless. For instance, Heaven is pure, and Earth turbid; Heaven moves, and the Earth is still. The Masculine is pure, the feminine turbid; the Masculine is active and the Feminine at rest. Emerging from its source and flowing on to all its developments, it produced the visible creation. The pure is the origin of the turbid, and the active of the motionless. If a man is able to remain permanently pure and motionless, Heaven and Earth will both at once come and dwell in him. (tr. Balfour 1884)

- Livia Kohn, 1993:

The Great Tao has no form; It brings forth and raises heaven and earth. The Great Tao has no feelings; It regulates the course of the sun and the moon. The Great Tao has no name; It raises and nourishes the myriad beings. I do not know its name – So I call it Tao.

The Tao can be pure or turbid; moving or tranquil. Heaven is pure, earth is turbid; Heaven is moving, earth is tranquil. The male is moving, the female is tranquil. Descending from the origin, Flowing toward the end, The myriad beings are being born. Purity – the source of turbidity, Movement – the root of tranquility. Always be pure and tranquil; Heaven and earth Return to the primordial. (tr. Kohn 1993)

Frederic H. Balfour also was sceptical that Laozi was the author of the Taoist book Tao Te Ching; notably writing in Leaves from my Chinese Scrapbook that Laozi "is a philosopher who never lived." Balfour believed that Laozi was an amalgam of wise ministers, or perhaps a literary device which Chuang Tzu used, as he expounded on his philosophy to students; very similar to the academic debate over the Greek philosopher Socrates.

== Man of letters ==
Frederic H. Balfour was a prolific religious scholar, and published several volumes discussing the implications of theism on emerging societies. He also wrote several lengthy discourses on agnosticism. His letters about famine conditions in China were highly regarded, as little credible news regularly made it out of China during this period. Many of these letters appeared in Harper's Magazine. Balfour published several novels; under his own name, as well as under the pseudonym Ross George Dering. For most of his time in China, Balfour worked as editor-in-chief for North China Daily News, The Shanghai Evening Courier, and The Celestial Empire newspapers.

=== Essays ===
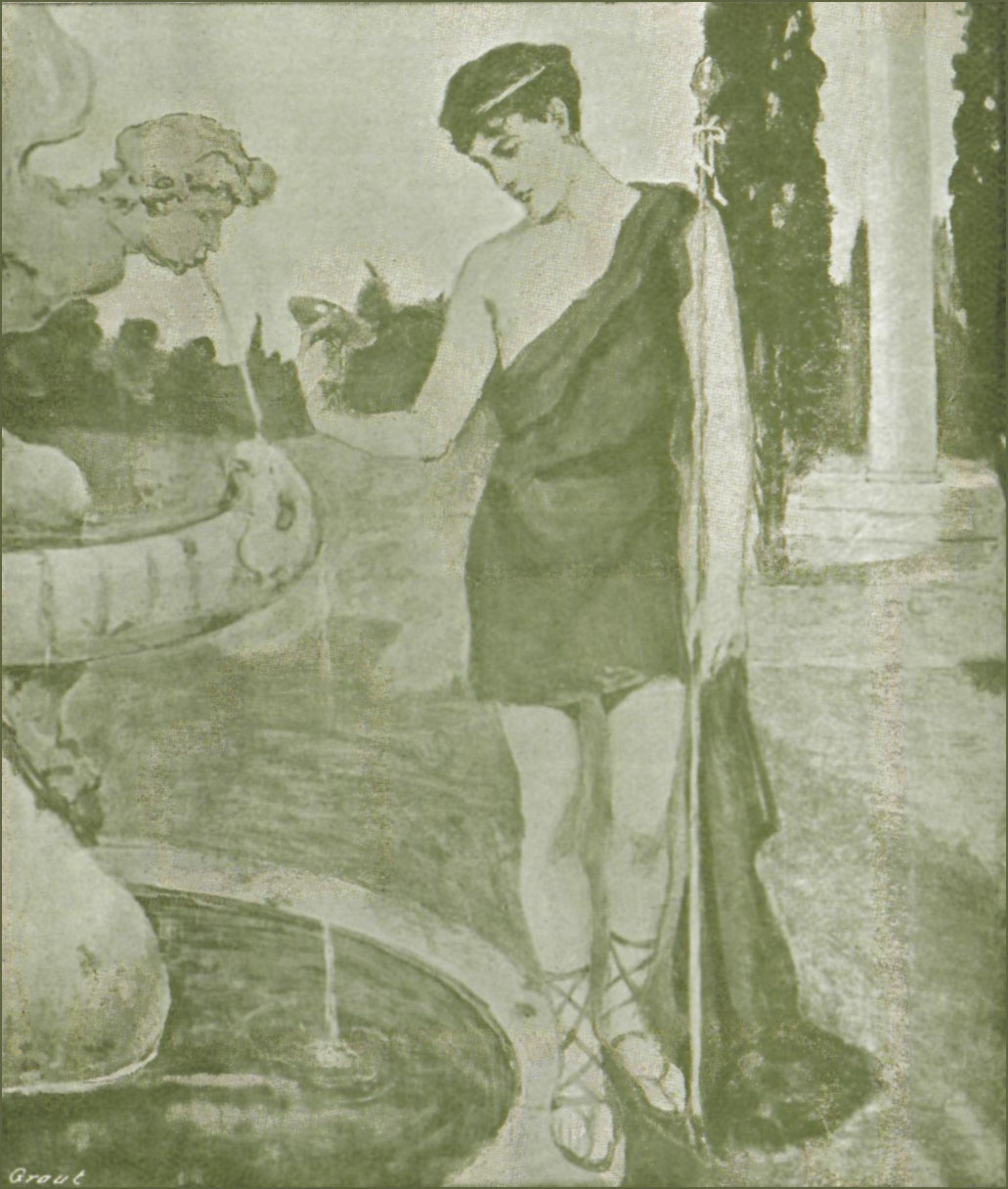
Frontispiece in the 1906 novel Austin And His Friends

- Preaching The Gospel (1872)
- Sermons Never Preached (1879)
- The Principle of Nature (1880)
- The Song of Songs (Which Is Solomon?) (1893)
- Unthinkables (1897)
- The Higher Agnosticism (1907)
- Religious Systems of the World (1901)
- The Relation of Spiritualism to Orthodoxy (1905)
- A Curious Physical Phenomenon (1906)
- A Patagonia Mage (1907)

=== Novels ===
- Writing as Frederic H. Balfour
  - Cherryfield Hall (1895)
  - The Expiation of Eugene (1904)
  - Austin And His Friends (1906)
- Writing as Ross George Dering
  - Giraldi (1889)
  - The Virgin's Vengeance (1889)
  - The Undergraduate (1891)
  - Dr. Mirabel's Theory (1893)

=== Translations ===
- Waifs & Strays from the Far East (1876)
- The Divine Classic of Nan-hua: Being the Works of Chuang Tsze, Taoist Philosopher (1881)
- Balfour, Frederic Henry (1883). Idiomatic Dialogues in the Peking Colloquial for the Use of Students. Shanghai: North-China Herald.
- Taoist Texts: Ethical, Political and Speculative (1884)
- Leaves from my Chinese Scrapbook (1887)

== Additional sources ==
- The Westminster Review, Richard Bentley & Son, London 1897
- China Review IX (1880–1881), p. 380–382
- China Review IX (1880–1881), p. 281–297
- The Ch'ing Ching Ching, in Taoist Texts: Ethical, Political and Speculative, Frederic H. Balfour, Trübner and Co, 1884
- Tao – The Way: Special Edition, ELPN Press, 2005 ISBN 1-934255-13-0
- Qingjing jing, Scripture of Clarity and Quiescence, Livia Kohn in The Encyclopedia of Taoism, Routledge, 2007, p. 800–801
- Frederic H. Balfour, Harvard University Press
- Frederic H. Balfour, Harvard University Press
- The Annals of Psychical Science (1906). Reprint by Kessinger, 2004 ISBN 1-4179-7797-3
- World Mystery by G.R.S. Mead, Kessinger, 1987 ISBN 0-922802-91-2
