= Baopuzi =

Taoist text by Ge Hong

- Traditional Chinese: 抱樸子
- Simplified Chinese: 抱朴子
- Literal meaning: [Book of the] Master [Who] Embraces Simplicity
Transcriptions
Standard Mandarin
- Hanyu Pinyin: bàopǔzǐ
- Wade–Giles: Pao-p'u-tzu
- IPA: [pâʊ.pʰù.tsì]
Middle Chinese
- Middle Chinese: /bɑu^{X}.pʰˠʌk̚.t͡sɨ^{X}/

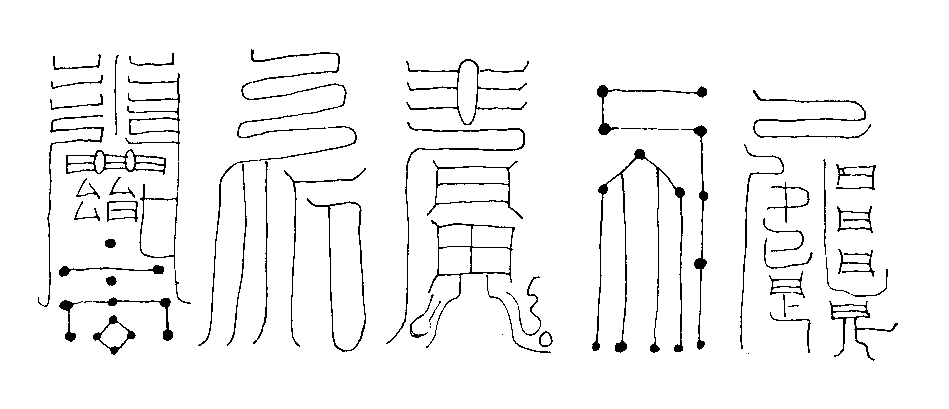
Laojun rushan fu 老君入山符 "Lord Lao's amulet for entering mountains" from Baopuzi Inner Chapter 17

Baopuzi (simplified Chinese: 抱朴子; traditional Chinese: 抱樸子) is a literary work written by Ge Hong (AD 283–343), (Chinese: 葛洪; Wade–Giles: Ko Hung), a scholar during the turbulent Jin dynasty.

Baopuzi is divided into two main sections, the esoteric Neipian (Chinese: 內篇,; lit. 'Inner Chapters') and the section intended for the public to understand: Waipian (Chinese: 外篇; lit. ''Outer Chapters''). The Taoist Inner Chapters discuss topics such as techniques to achieve "hsien" (Chinese: 仙; lit. 'immortality', 'transcendence'), Chinese alchemy, elixirs, and demonology. The Confucian Outer Chapters discuss Chinese literature, Legalism, politics, and society.

== Title ==
The eponymous title Baopuzi derives from Ge Hong's hao (號), the hao being a type of sobriquet or pseudonym. Baopuzi literally means "The Master Who Embraces Simplicity;" compounded from the words bao (抱) meaning "embrace; hug; carry; hold in both arms; cherish"; pu (樸) meaning "uncarved wood", also being a Taoist metaphor for a "person's original nature; simple; plain"; and, zi (子) meaning "child; offspring; master (title of respect)". Baopu (Pao-p'u; literally:"Simplex"), is a classical allusion to the Tao Te Ching (19):

見素抱樸；少私寡欲。絕學無憂。
见素抱朴；少私寡欲。绝学无忧。
Xiàn sù bào pǔ; shǎo sī guǎ yù. Jué xué wú yōu.
Evince the plainness of undyed silk, embrace the simplicity of the unhewn log; lessen selfishness, diminish desires; abolish learning and you will be without worries.

— Tao Te Ching, 19. Translated by Victor Mair

Ge Hong's autobiography explains his rationale for choosing his pen name Baopuzi.

洪之為人也，而騃野，性鈍口訥，形貌醜陋，而終不辯自矜飾也。冠履垢弊，衣或襤褸，而或不恥焉。俗之服用，俾而屢改，或忽廣領而大帶，或促身而修袖，或長裾曳地，或短不蔽腳。洪期於守常，不隨世變。言則率實，杜絕嘲戲，不得其人，終日默然。故邦人鹹稱之為抱朴之士。是以洪著書，因以自號焉。
I [Hong] am an unsophisticated person; dull by nature, and a stammerer. My physical frame is unpleasant to look at; and I am not competent enough to boast of myself and gloss over the defects. My hat and shoes are dirty; my clothes sometimes the worse for wear or patched; but this does not always bother me. Styles in clothing change too quickly and too often: One moment they are broad at the neck, and the belt is wide; another moment they fit tight and have big sleeves; then again they become long and sweep the ground, or short and do not cover the feet. I am an unsophisticated person, It has been my plan to preserve regularity and not to follow the whims of the world. My speech is frank and sincere; I engage in no banter. If I do not come upon the right person, I can spend the day in silence. This is the reason my neighbors call me Simplex (Pao-p'u), which name I have used as a sobriquet in my writings.

Compare these autobiography translations: "people all call me a pao-p'u scholar (i.e., one who keeps his basic nature, one who is unperturbed by the desires of the world)"; "among the people of his district there were those who called him "The Scholar Who Embraces Simplicity"." Wu and Davis noted, "This name has been translated Old Sober-Sides, but Dr. Wu considers that it has no satirical intent and would better be translated Solemn-Seeming Philosopher." Fabrizio Pregadio translates "Master Who Embraces Spontaneous Nature".

== History ==
In comparison to many other Taoist texts, the origins of the Baopuzi are well documented. Ge completed the book during the era of Jianwu (建武), 317–318, when Emperor Yuan of Jin founded the Eastern Jin dynasty. Ge Hongu subsequently revised Baopuzi during the era of Xianhe (咸和), 326–334.

Ge Hong's autobiography (Outer Chapter 50) records writing the Baopuzi.

In my twenties I planned to compose some little things in order not to waste my time, for it seemed best to create something that would constitute the sayings of one sole thinker. This is when I outlined my philosophical writing, but it was also the moment when I became involved in armed rebellion and found myself wandering and scattered even farther afield, some of my things getting lost. Although constantly on the move, I did not abandon my brush again for a dozen or so years, so that at the age of 37 or 38 [A.D. 317-18] I found my work completed. In all, I have composed Nei p'ien in 20 scrolls, Wai p'ien in 50; … [list of other writings, totaling 310 scrolls] My Nei p'ien, telling of gods and genii, prescriptions and medicines, ghosts and marvels, transformations, maintenance of life, extension of years, exorcising evils, and banishing misfortune, belongs to the Taoist school. My Wai p'ien, giving an account of success and failure in human affairs and of good and evil in public affairs, belongs to the Confucian school.

Compare the more literal translation of Davis and Ch'en, "I left off writing for ten and odd years, for I was constantly on the road, until the era Chien-wu 建武 (317-318 A.D.) when I got it ready."

Ge's autobiography mentions his military service fighting rebels against the Jin dynasty, and successfully defending his hometown of Jurong (句容), in modern Zhenjiang, Jiangsu. In 330 Emperor Cheng of Jin granted Ge the fief of "Marquis of Guanzhong" with income from 200 Jurong households. Scholars believe Ge revised the Baopuzi during this period, sometime around 330 or 332.

The Baopuzi consists of 70 pian (篇) "chapters; books" divided between the 20 "Inner Chapters" and 50 "Outer Chapters" (which can be compared with the Zhuangzi textual division). Nathan Sivin described it as "not one book but two, considerably different in theme". The Neipian and Waipian "led entirely separate physical existences; they were not combined under a single title until a millennium after Ko's time".

The (1444–1445) Ming dynasty Daozang "Taoist canon" first printed the two Baopuzi parts together. This Zhengtong Daozang (正統道藏), or "Taoist Canon of the Zhengtong Era (1436-1450)", bibliographically categorized the Baopuzi under the Taiqing 太淸 "Supreme Clarity" section for alchemical texts. Daozang editions encompass six juan (卷 "scrolls; fascicles; volumes"), three each for the Inner and Outer Chapters. Most received versions of Baopuzi descend from this Ming Daozang text.

== Content ==
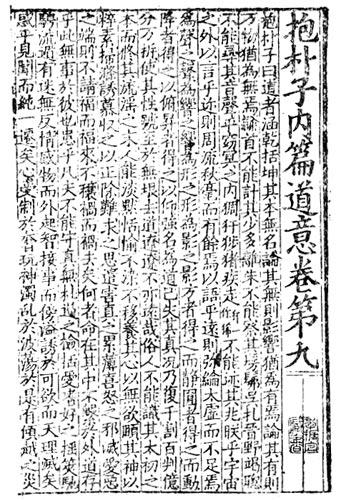
First Page of Baopuzi Inner Chapter 9

The Baopuzi's Inner and Outer Chapters discuss miscellaneous topics ranging from esotericism to social philosophy. The Inner Chapters discuss techniques to achieve hsien, also transcribed as "xian", (仙) "immortality; transcendence", Chinese alchemy, meditation, Daoyin exercises, Chinese herbology, demons and other spiritual creatures, and fu (符) "magic talismans". The Outer Chapters discuss Chinese philosophy, Confucianism, Legalism, government, politics, literature, scholarship, and include Ge's autobiography, which Waley called "the fullest document of this kind that early China produced".

According to Ge Hong's autobiography, he divided the Inner and Outer Chapters on the distinction between Taoism and Confucianism. Ge philosophically described Taoism as the ben (本) "root; trunk; origin" and Confucianism as the mo (末) "tip; branch; end". When asked, "Which has the priority, Confucianism or Taoism?" – Baopuzi replies, "Taoism is the very trunk of Confucianism, but Confucianism is only a branch of Taoism."

While the Baopuzi Inner and Outer Chapters differ in content, they share a general format with an unnamed interlocutor posing questions and Ge Hong providing answers. The conventional syntax is Huowen yue (或問曰) "Someone asked, saying" and Baopuzi da yue (抱樸子答曰) "Baopuzi answered, saying".

=== Inner Chapters ===
The twenty Neipian "Inner Chapters" record arcane techniques for achieving hsien "transcendence; immortality". These techniques span two types of Chinese alchemy that Tang dynasty scholars later differentiated into neidan 內丹 "internal elixir; internal alchemy" and waidan 外丹 "external elixir; external alchemy". The word dan 丹 "cinnabar; red; pellet; [Chinese medicine] pill" means "pill of immortality, or elixir of life. Ge Hong details his researches into the arts of transcendence and immortality. "Internal alchemy" concerns creating an "immortal body" within the corporeal body through both physiological methods (dietary, respiratory, martial, etc.) and mental practices (meditation, extracorporeal visualization, etc.). "External" or "laboratory alchemy" concerns compounding elixirs (esp. from minerals and metals), writing fu talismans or amulets, herbalism, and exorcism.

Lai outlines the Inner Chapters subjects:

(1) proofs of the per se existence of immortals and transcendent states of immortality of the body; (2) stipulation of the accessibility to the perfect state of long life to everyone, irrespective of one's social status but dependent on whether one could study deeply and strenuously cultivate the necessary esoteric methods; (3) elaboration of diverse esoteric techniques leading one to become a hsien-immortal; and (4) descriptions and criticism of the diverse contemporary Taoist discourses and sects.

Several chapters have specific themes. Chapters 4, 8, 11, and 16 describe waidan "external alchemy". Inner Chapter 18 details meditation practices. In Chapter 19, Ge Hong praises his master Zheng Yin 鄭隱 (c. 215 – c. 302), catalogs Taoist books, and lists talismans.

Table 1: The Neipian 內篇 "Inner Chapters"
Number	Pinyin	Characters	Translation
1	Changxuan	暢玄	Defining the Mysterious
2	Lunxian	論仙	About Immortals
3	Duisu	對俗	Rejoinders to Popular Conceptions
4	Jindan	金丹	Gold and Cinnabar [pill of immortality]
5	Zhili	至理	The Ultimate Order
6	Weizhi	微旨	The Meaning of "Subtle"
7	Sainan	塞難	Countering Objections
8	Shizhi	釋滯	Resolving Obstructions
9	Daoyi	道意	The Meaning of "the Way"
10	Mingben	明本	Clarifying the Basic [Confucian and Taoist differences]
11	Xianyao	仙藥	The Medicine of Immortality
12	Bianwen	辨問	Discerning Questions
13	Jiyan	極言	The Ultimate Words [regarding immortality]
14	Qinqiu	勤求	Diligently Seeking [for a teacher]
15	Zaying	雜應	Miscellaneous Answers
16	Huangbai	黃白	Yellow and White [gold and silver]
17	Dengshe	登涉	Climbing [Mountains] and Crossing [Rivers]
18	Dizhen	地眞	The Terrestrial Truth
19	Xialan	遐覽	Broad Overview [of Taoist literature]
20	Quhuo	袪惑	Allaying Doubts

Many scholars have praised the Inner Chapters. Joseph Needham, who called Ge Hong "the greatest alchemist in Chinese history", quoted the following passage about medicines from different biological categories.

Interlocutor: Life and death are predetermined by fate and their duration is normally fixed. Life is not something any medicine can shorten or lengthen. A finger that has been cut off cannot be joined on again and expected to continue growing. Blood from a wound, though swallowed, is of no benefit. Therefore, it is most inappropriate to approve of taking such nonhuman substances as pine or thuya [cypress] to protract the brief span of life.
Ko: According to your argument, a thing is beneficial only if it belongs to the same category as that which is treated. … If we followed your suggestion and mistrusted things of a different type, we would be obliged to crush flesh and smelt bone to prepare a medicine for wounds, or to fry skin and roast hair to treat baldness. Water and soil are not of the same substance as the various plants; yet the latter rely upon them for growth. The grains are not of the same species as living men; yet living men need them in order to stay alive. Fat is not to be classed with fire, nor water with fish, yet when there is no more fat the fires dies, and when there is no more water, fish perish. (3)

Needham evaluated this passage, "Admittedly there is much in the Pao Phu Tzu which is wild, fanciful and superstitious, but here we have a discussion scientifically as sound as anything in Aristotle, and very much superior to anything which the contemporary occident could produce."

In addition to quoting early alchemical texts, the Inner Chapters describe Ge Hong's laboratory experiments. Wu and Davis mention the Baopuzi formula for making mosaic gold "a golden crystalline powder used as a pigment" from Ch'ih Yen 赤鹽 "red crystal salt" (produced from amethyst, calcite crystal, and alum) and Hwei Chih 灰汁 "limewater".

The description of one process deserves special discussion, for it evidently concerns the preparation of stannic sulfide or "mosaic gold" and is perhaps the earliest known description of the preparation of this interesting substance. Mosaic gold exists in flakes or leaflets which have the color and the luster of gold, it does not tarnish, and is used at present for bronzing radiators, gilding picture frames and similar purposes. As Ko Hung describes the process, "tin sheets, each measuring six inches square by one and two-tenths inches thick, are covered with a one-tenth inch layer of a mud-like mixture of Ch'ih Yen (Red Salt) and Hwei Chih (potash-water, limewater), ten pounds of tin to every four of Ch'ih Yen." They are then heated in a sealed earthenware pot for thirty days with horse manure (probably with a smoldering fire of dried manure). "All the tin becomes ash like and interspersed with bean-like pieces which are the yellow gold." The large portion of the metallic tin is converted into some ash-like compound or possibly into the ash-like allotropic modification, gray tin. A small portion of the tin is converted into bean-sized aggregates of flaky stannic sulfide. The yield is poor, for the author says that "twenty ounces of gold are obtained from every twenty pounds of tin used."

The authors add, "It seems likely that Ko Hung was personally experienced in the chemistry of tin, for the Chinese say that he was the first to make tin foil and that he made magic or spirit money out of it."

=== Outer Chapters ===
The fifty Waipian "Outer Chapters" are more diffuse than the Inner ones. Ge Hong diversely wrote essays on Jin dynasty issues of philosophy, morality, politics, and society. This Baopuzi portion details everyday problems among Han dynasty northerners who fled into southern China after the fall of Luoyang.

Some of the Outer Chapters are thematically organized. Ge Hong wrote chapters 46, 47, and 48 to dispute three adversaries: Kuo Tai 郭太 (128-169), who founded the Qingtan "pure conversation" school, Ni Heng 禰衡 (173-198), who was an infamously arrogant official of Ts'ao Ts'ao, and Pao Ching-yen 鮑敬言 (ca. 405-ca. 466), who was an early anarchist philosopher.

Table 2: The Waipian 外篇 "Outer Chapters"
Number	Pinyin	Characters	Translation
1	Jiadun	嘉遯	Praising Eremitism
2	Yimin	逸民	Rusticating People
3	Xuxue	勖學	Encouraging Study
4	Chongjiao	崇敎	Respecting Education
5	Jundao	君道	The Way of the Ruler
6	Chenjie	臣節	The Integrity of the Ministers
7	Lianggui	良規	Good Regulations
8	Shinan	時難	Averting Difficulties at the Right Time
9	Guanli	官理	The Right Order among the Officials
10	Wuzheng	務正	The Correct Use of Instruments
11	Guixian	貴賢	Esteeming Wise People
12	Renneng	任能	Employing the Able
13	Qinshi	欽士	Respecting Well-Minded Subjects
14	Yongxing	用刑	Employing Punishments
15	Shenju	審擧	Examining Promotions
16	Jiaoji	交際	Keeping Company
17	Beique	備闕	Encountering Deficiencies
18	Zhuocai	擢才	Promoting Talents
19	Renming	任命	Employing Orders
20	Mingshi	名實	Name and Reality
21	Qingjian	淸鑒	The Pure Mirror
22	Xingpin	行品	Using Official Ranks
23	Misong	弭訟	Ending Disputes
24	Jiujie	酒誡	Admonitions on Alcohol
25	Jimiu	疾謬	Pointing out Faults
26	Jihuo	譏惑	Censuring Muddleheadedness
27	Cijiao	刺驕	Criticizing Arrogance
28	Baili	百里	Hundred Miles
29	Jieshu	接疏	Meeting Visitors
30	Junshi	鈞世	Equalizing Generations
31	Shengfan	省煩	Decreasing Vexations
32	Shangbo	尙博	Valuing Breadth of Learning
33	Hanguo	漢過	The Faults of Han
34	Wushi	吳失	The Failings of Wu
35	Shouji	守塉	Guarding Barren Land
36	Anpin	安貧	Content with Poverty
37	Renming	仁明	Benevolence and Brilliance
38	Boyu	博喻	Extensive Analogies
39	Guangpi	廣譬	Vast Examples
40	Ciyi	辭義	Writings and Ideas
41	Xunben	循本	Abiding by Basics
42	Yingchao	應嘲	Responding to Ridicule
43	Yupi	喻蔽	Clarifying Obscurities
44	Baijia	百家	The Hundred Schools
45	Wenxing	文行	Cultivated Behavior
46	Zheng Guo	正郭	Correcting Guo [Tai]
47	Tan Ni	彈禰	Accusing Ni [Heng]
48	Jie Bao	詰鮑	Bao [Jingyan]
49	Zhizhi, Qiongda, Chongyan	知止, 窮達, 重言	Knowing When to Stop, Obscurity and Eminence, Reduplicated Words
50	Zixu	自敘	Autobiography

== Translations ==
The Baopuzi has been translated into English, Italian, German, and Japanese. There exist more English translations of the twenty Inner Chapters than of the fifty Outer Chapters.

The Inner Chapters have several partial translations. Tenney L. Davis, professor of organic chemistry at Massachusetts Institute of Technology, collaborated on first translations of the Inner Chapters relevant to the history of alchemy. Wu and Davis translated chapters 4 "On the Gold Medicine" and 16 "On the Yellow and White" (i.e., gold and silver). Davis and Ch'en translated chapters 8 "Overcoming Obstructions" and 11 "On Hsien Medicines", and provided paraphrases or summaries of the remaining Inner Chapters. The German sinologist Eugene Feifel made English translations of chapters 1–3, 4, and 11. More recently, excerpts from the Inner Chapters are quoted by Verellen and Pregadio.

An early, outdated complete translation was published by James R. Ware, which also includes Ge Hong's autobiography from Outer Chapter 50. Several reviewers censured the quality of Ware's translation, for instance, Kroll called it "at times misguided". Huard's and Wong's critical assessment of Ware was criticized in turn by Sivin. "Their review, nonetheless, can only be described as perfunctory. Only the forematter and endmatter of Ware's book are evaluated, and that in a curiously cursory fashion." Ware's translation has now been supplanted by the recent (2025) complete annotated translation of the Daoist Translation Committee 道教翻譯學會 (DTC), which is under the supervision and editorial direction of Dr. Louis Komjathy 康思奇 of the Center for Daoist Studies 道學中心.

Translating the fundamental Taoist word Tao ("way; path; principle") as English God is a conspicuous peculiarity of Ware's Baopuzi version. The Introduction gives a convoluted Christian justification, first quoting J.J.L. Duyvendak's translation of Tao Te Ching 25, "Its rightful name I do not know, but I give It the sobriquet Tao (= God). If a rightful name is insisted upon, I would call It Maximal."

Then, upon noticing that Tao Te Ching, verse 34, is willing to call the Something "Minimal," every schoolman would have understood that the Chinese author was talking about God, for only in God do contraries become identical! Accordingly, the present translator will always render this use of the term Tao by God. In doing so, he keeps always in mind as the one and only definition the equation establishable from Exod. 3:13-15 and Mark 12:26-27, to mention only two very clear statements. It will be recalled that in the first God says, "My name is I am, I live, I exist," while the second reads, "God is not of the dead but of the living." Therefore, God = Life or Being.

Ware admitted his God for Dao translation cannot be applied consistently.

It is clear that the word tao appears frequently in this text not as a designation of God but of the process by which God is to be approximated or attained. In such cases I shall translate it as "the divine process." In instances where either this or "God" would be appropriate, a translator is obliged to be arbitrary. The term tao shih is rendered "processor"; hsien is translated "genie" rather than "immortal".

These Chinese words are Tao-shih' 道士 ("Taoist priest or practitioner" )and "hsien" 仙 ("immortal; transcendent".) Ho Peng-Yoke, an authority in the History of science and technology in China, criticized Ware's translations.

It may be true that in certain areas the concept of Tao overlaps with the definition and attributes of God, or for that matter with those of Allah, for example oneness and eternity. However, there is the danger of the analogy being pushed too far. Similarly, the reader might be warned that "Genii," as used for rendering the word hsien, does not convey the concept of some supernatural slaves as found in the lamp and the ring of the Thousand-and-One Nights. The reviewer prefers the terminology used by Tenny L. Davis, i.e. Tao left untranslated and "immortal" for hsien.

Nevertheless, Ho's review concluded with praise. "Professor Ware is to be congratulated for bringing out the translation of a most difficult Chinese Taoist text in a very readable form. One cannot find another text that gives so much useful and authoritative information on alchemy and Taoism in fourth-century China."

Ge Hong wrote the Baopuzi in elegant Classical Chinese grammar and terminology, but some Inner Chapter contexts are difficult to translate. Comparing three versions of this passage listing hsien medicines illustrates the complex translation choices.

The best hsien medicine is cinnabar. Others in the order of decreasing excellence are gold, silver, ch'ih, the five jades, mica, pearl, realgar, t'ai i yü yü liang, shih chung huang tzu 石中黃子 (literally yellow nucleus in stone), shih kuei 石桂 (stony cinnamon), quartz, shih nao 石腦, shih liu huang 石硫黃 (a kind of raw sulfur), wild honey and tseng ch'ing. (11)

Medicines of superior quality for immortality are: cinnabar; next comes gold, then follows silver, then the many chih, then the five kinds of jade, then mica, then ming-chu, then realgar, then brown hematite, then conglomerate masses of brown hematite, then stone cassia (?), then quartz, then paraffin, then sulphur, then wild honey, then malachite (stratified variety)

At the top of the genie's pharmacopoeia stands cinnabar. Second comes gold; third, silver, fourth, excresences; fifth, the jades; sixth, mica; seventh, pearls; eighth, realgar; ninth, brown hematite; tenth, conglomerated brown hematite; eleventh, quartz; twelfth, rock crystal; thirteenth, geodes; fourteenth, sulphur; fifteenth, wild honey; and sixteenth, laminar malachite.

The Baopuzi Outer Chapters have one partial translation into English. Jay Sailey translated 21 of the 50 chapters: 1, 3, 5, 14–15, 20, 24–26, 30–34, 37, 40, 43–44, 46–47, and 50. In addition, Sailey included appendices on "Buddhism and the Pao-p'u-tzu", "Biography of Ko Hung" from the Jin Shu, and "Recensions" of lost Baopuzi fragments quoted in later texts. Kroll gave a mixed review: "Although Sailey's renderings frequently obscure Ko Hung's carefully polished diction and nuance, they reliably convey the sense of the original and should be a substantial boon to Western students of medieval Chinese thought and culture."

== Significance ==
For centuries, traditional scholars have revered the Baopuzi as canonical Taoist scripture, but in recent years, modern scholars have reevaluated the text's veracity.

Traditional scholarship viewed the Baopuzi, especially the Inner Chapters, as a primary textual source for early Chinese waidan "external alchemy". Wu and Davis described it as,

probably the widest known and highest regarded of the ancient Chinese treatises on alchemy. It has been preserved for us as part of the Taoist canon. It shows us the art matured by five or six centuries of practice, having its traditional heroes and an extensive literature, its technique and philosophy now clearly fixed, its objectives and pretentions established. This art the author examines in a hardheaded manner and expounds in language which is remarkably free from subterfuge.

Arthur Waley praised Ge Hong's rational attitude toward alchemy.

Nowhere in Pao P'u Tzu's book do we find the hierophantic tone that pervades most writings on alchemy both in the East and in the West. He uses a certain number of secret terms, such as 金公 "metal-lord" and 河車 "river chariot", both of which mean lead; and 河上她女 "the virgin on the river", which means mercury … But his attitude is always that of a solidly educated layman examining claims which a narrow-minded orthodoxy had dismissed with contempt.

In the estimation of Ho, the Baopuzi is a "more important" alchemical text than Wei Boyang's (ca. 142) Cantong qi 參同契 "The Kinship of the Three". The Baopuzi mentions a Neijing 內經 "Inner Classic" by Wei Boyang, but curiously does not mention Wei's Cantong ji.

Modern scholarship has taken another look at the Baopuzi. Sivin demeans the text's significance.

The Inner Chapters are anything but the writings of a Taoist man of wisdom or organizer for his disciples or for other initiates. This book is a vast trove of commonplaces and hearsay about popular beliefs in which Ko's few incontestably Taoist texts play an essential but small part. Its goal is not to catalog, synthesize, or provide a handbook of techniques. It is rather a dialog in which Ko hurls scattershot against a skeptical anonymous interlocutor. The Inner Chapters are a one-issue book. Ko seeks to convince his questioner, and thereby his readers, that immortality is a proper object of study and is attainable – not only by the ancients but in his own time, not only by a destined few but by anyone with enough faith to undertake arduous and dangerous disciplines. The devotion that Ko calls for implies wholesale acceptance of legends, myths, tales of prodigies, magical beliefs, religious faiths – practically every belief current in the popular imagination of Ko's time and the inverse in almost every sense of what "fundamentalist Confucian" humanists considered worthy of thought (but then they were no longer setting the intellectual style).

Sivin sarcastically compares Ge Hong, "an obsessed bookman and indiscriminate lore-collector", with Alan Watts. "Ko's style was rather than of a pedantic purveyor of occultism to the upper class. I can only think of him as the Alan Watts of his time." However, James Benn observes, "This judgement is perhaps not as damning as Professor Sivin intended. Certainly, one would not now go to Watts in the hope of learning much about Taoism, but a close study of his work would tell us a great deal about perceptions and presuppositions concerning Asian religions in mid-twentieth century America. Like Watts and others of his generation it is true that Ge Hong did see religion as a personal matter, and he seems to have approached it from the point of view of a fan or enthusiast more than as an initiate."

Chi-Tim Lai interprets the Inner Chapters as a "new discourse" on hsien"-immortality through personal salvation and perfection, contrasting with the traditional "imperial discourse" that only the rich could afford to achieve a state of hsien." For example, histories record that both Qin Shi Huang and Emperor Wu of Han dispatched imperial naval expeditions to obtain the "elixir of immortality" from mythical Mount Penglai. "That is, an individual's self-perfection is only dependent upon ascetic, mystic, and ethical behavior. Since it is a new religious discourse supposedly open to all people, the quest for a prolonged life is no longer the preserve of the wealthy and powerful."

According to Ko Hung, the hsien-immortals who can achieve the complete avoidance of death rarely come from the social groups of worthies, emperors, or sages. Hence, he implies that hsien-immortality are distinctive "human" ideal values to be pursued and potentially achieved by anyone. In the first, in order to differentiate the ideal values of hsien-immortal from this worldly worthies and powers, Ko Hung says, "Those who attained immortal were almost all poor and lowly. They were not men of position and power."' Second, in placing the ideal of hsien-immortality out of the reach of imperial figures, Ko Hung rebukes emperors such as the First Emperor of the Ch'in and Emperor Han-wu-ti, who were "models" of seeking for immortality in ancient Chinese history and literature, by saying, "These two emperors had a hollow reputation for wanting immortality, but they never experienced the reality of cultivating the Tao."

Ge Hong quotes his teacher Zheng Yin's explanation that poverty forces Tao-shi ("Taoist practitioners") seeking hsien techniques to engage in the difficulties and dangers of alchemy.

Then I asked further, "Why should we not eat the gold and silver which are already in existence instead of taking the trouble to make them? What are made will not be real gold and silver but just make-believes." Said Cheng Chun in reply, "The gold and silver which are found in the world are suitable for the purpose. But Tao-shih are all poor; witness the adage that Hsien are never stout and Tao-shih never rich. Tao-shih usually go in groups of five or ten, counting the teacher and his disciples. Poor as they are, how can they be expected to get the necessary gold and silver? Furthermore they cannot cover the great distances to gather the gold and silver which occur in nature. The only thing left for them to do is to make the metals themselves". (16)

Ware translates this adage, "There are no fat genii and no rich processors".

For a wealthy person seeking hsien (transcendence), Ge Hong recommends compounding jinyi 金液 (lit. "gold liquid/fluid") "golden liquor" in a huachi 花池 (lit. "flower pond"), "a vinegar solvent" (fortified with saltpeter). This is simpler to produce than traditional jiuding 九鼎 "nine tripods" elixirs (attributed to the Yellow Emperor), but more expensive – eight doses cost 400,000 cash.

It is true that the nine medicines are the best of Hsien medicines. Yet the materials for their compounding are quite numerous. They are easily procurable only in large cities which have good facilities for communication, but are not to be obtained at other places. Furthermore, in the compounding of the medicines, the fires should be tended for tens of days and nights with industrious application and close adjustment, which is a great difficulty. The compounding of the Gold Fluid is much easier. There the only thing which is difficult is to get the gold. One pound in the old measure is equivalent to two in our contemporary measure. Such a quantity of gold would cost only some three hundred thousand cash. The other auxiliary materials are easy to procure. In the compounding, no fire is required. All that needs to be done is to have the mixture in a Hua Ch'ih (Flower Pond) for the necessary number of days. A total expenditure of four hundred thousand cash will make an amount large enough to transform eight persons into Hsien. Just as no wine is formed by the fermentation of small quantities of rice, so small quantities of materials will not be able to interact to give the medicine. (4)

Pregadio says recent studies show Ge's intent was "glorifying the religious and ritual legacy of Jiangnan 江南 (the region south of the lower Yangtze River), emphasizing the superiority of certain traditions over others, and enhancing their prestige among the social elite to which Ge Hong belonged." Nonetheless, Pregadio concludes,

Ge Hong's testimony deserves attention as a valuable overview of the religious traditions of Jiangnan just before the Way of the Celestial Masters (Tianshi dao) spread to that area, soon followed by the Shangqing and Lingbao revelations. From this point of view, the Baopuzi documents important links between the earlier and later history of Taoism, as it also does for medicine and other fields.
