= Livia Kohn =

Scholar of Daoism and East Asian Studies

- Born: March 14, 1956 (age 70)

Academic background
- Education: Bonn University (PhD)

Academic work
- Discipline: Religious scholar
- Sub-discipline: Taoism
- Institutions: Kyoto University; University of Michigan; Boston University

Livia (Knaul) Kohn (born March 14, 1956) is an emeritus professor of Religion and East Asian Studies at Boston University, specializing in studies of Taoism (or Daoism).

Kohn completed her Ph.D. at Bonn University in 1980. She has held academic positions at Kyoto University (1981–1986), University of Michigan (1986–1987), and Boston University (1988–2006). Kohn has authored or edited over 50 books and many articles on Daoism. She has served as an executive editor of Three Pines Press since 2000 and the Journal of Daoist Studies since 2008. Kohn is a multilingual scholar and has written or translated works in German, English, Chinese, and Japanese.

Livia Kohn was cited as a prolific scholar of Daoism early in her career. However, her influence on Western cultural understanding of Daoism and other East Asian religious practices extends beyond the scholarly literature. Kohn practices tai chi, is a certified instructor of yoga and qigong, and leads workshops, seminars, and tours of Japan.

== Selected works ==
- Early Chinese Mysticism: Philosophy and Soteriology in the Taoist Tradition. Princeton University Press, 1992, ISBN 978-0691073811
- The Taoist Experience: An Anthology. State University of New York Press, New York, 1993, ISBN 978-0791415801
- Daoism Handbook. Brill Verlag, Leiden, Boston, Cologne, 2000, ISBN 90-04-11208-1
- Daoist Identity: History, Lineage and Ritual. University of Hawai'i Press, 2002, ISBN 978-0824825041
- Monastic Life in Medieval Daoism: A Cross-Cultural Perspective. University of Hawai'i Press, 2003, ISBN 978-0824826512
- Daoism and Chinese Culture. University of Hawai'i Press, 2005, ISBN 978-1931483001
- Daoist Body Cultivation: Traditional Models and Contemporary Practices. Three Pines Press, 2006, ISBN 978-1931483056
- Chinese Healing Exercises: The Tradition of Daoyin. University of Hawai'i Press, 2008, ISBN 978-0824832698
- Introducing Daoism. Routledge, 2009, ISBN 978-0-41543-998-5
- Seven stages of Taoist meditation: the Zuòwànglùn. Medical-Literary Publishing Company, Uelzen, 2010, ISBN 978-3-88136-248-1
