= Pill of Immortality =

Refined pill in Taoism and Chinese traditional medicine

- Chinese: 丹
- Literal meaning: Refined pill, cinnabar
Transcriptions
Standard Mandarin
- Hanyu Pinyin: dān

Alternative Chinese name
- Chinese: 仙丹
- Literal meaning: Immortality (xiān) pill
Transcriptions
Standard Mandarin
- Hanyu Pinyin: xiāndān

Second alternative Chinese name
- Chinese: 金丹
- Literal meaning: Gold pill
Transcriptions
Standard Mandarin
- Hanyu Pinyin: jīndān

The Pill of Immortality, also known as xiandan (仙丹), jindan (金丹) or dan (丹) in general, was an elixir or pill sought by Chinese alchemists to confer physical or spiritual immortality. It is typically represented as a spherical pill of dark color and uniform texture, made of refined medical material. Colloquially and in Chinese medicine, the term can also refer to medicine of great efficacy.

The search for the pill was started several centuries BC and continued until 500 AD and was often based on noble metals such as mercury and gold. Its search was supported by the emperors and the nobility of China, with a strong tradition in Taoism. During the Qin dynasty, the founding Emperor Qin Shi Huang consulted sages and alchemists to seek such a pill to achieve eternal life.

The alchemical tradition in China was divided into two differing schools in the search for the pill of immortality. Taoist sects which advocated the attainment of immortality by consuming substances were very popular during the Eastern Han dynasty in the 2nd century AD and they were collectively known as the school of the "external pill", or Waidan (外丹). By contrast, "internal alchemy", or Neidan (内丹), was thought to create an immortal body within the corporeal body, and a variety of actions involving dietary, respiratory, and sexual practices and/or mental practices such as meditation were believed to cause immortality.

== Legend ==
The writings of the Liexian Zhuan describes a man named Wei Boyang who had made such a pill of immortality.

Texts dating from the 4th century AD and later present the Yellow Emperor near the end of his reign as finding the pill in the Huang Shan mountain range, then establishing the seventy-two peaks of the mountains as the dwelling place for the immortals.

== See also ==
- Ambrosia, food/drink of the Greek gods depicted as conferring longevity or immortality
- Amrita, of Hindu mythology, a drink which confers immortality on the Gods, and a cognate of ambrosia
- Elixir of life, a potion sought by alchemy to produce immortality
- Ichor, blood of the Greek Gods, related to ambrosia
- Iðunn's apples in Norse mythology
- Manna, food given by Yahweh to the Israelites
- Peaches of Immortality in Chinese mythology
- Soma (drink), a ritual drink of importance among the early Indo-Iranians, and the subsequent Vedic and greater Persian cultures
