= Golden Elixir Press =

Independent publisher on Taoism

- Founded: 2009
- Country of origin: United States
- Headquarters location: Mountain View, California
- Publication types: Books, PDF, Kindle ebooks, iBook ebooks
- Nonfiction topics: Taoism and Neidan
- Official website: www.goldenelixir.com

Golden Elixir Press is an independent publisher of books and occasional papers on Taoism and Taoist Internal Alchemy (Neidan). The press was founded in 2009. As of July 2026, it had published about two dozen works, some of which are concerned with other traditions, such as Hinduism, Buddhism, and Sufism.

According to an interview with the press founder, originally published in the Silent Tao website, the intended audience of Golden Elixir Press is "everyone who is interested for any reason in the doctrines of the Way of the Golden Elixir". The books published by the press are mainly addressed to the general public, but they have also been well-received by the academic community.

Publications of Golden Elixir Press include translations of some of the main texts of Taoist Internal Alchemy:

- Cantong qi (Seal of the Unity of the Three)
- Wuzhen pian (Awakening to Reality)
- Yinfu jing (Book of the Hidden Agreement)
- The Xiuzhen houbian, one of the main works by Liu Yiming (1734-1821)

In addition, the press has published general works on Taoism, reference materials such as an index to the Daozang (Taoist Canon), and shorter occasional papers, including an introduction to the Chinese alchemical traditions.

Golden Elixir Press is closely related to Fabrizio Pregadio, a scholar who, in addition to his academic research, publishes translations of original Chinese texts addressed to a wider audience.
