= Qiji =

Qiji may refer to:

- Prince Qiji, later King Ping of Chu
- Qiji (monk) (863-937), Chinese poet and Buddhist monk
- Making Miracles, a 2007 Singaporean TV series
- Miracles (1989 film), a Hong Kong film

== Towns in China ==
- Qiji, Anhui (祁集), in Huainan, Anhui
- Qiji, Xingtai (七级), Hebei
- Qiji, Wuji County (七汲), Hebei
- Qiji, Qingdao (七级), Shandong
- Qiji, Yanggu County (七级), Shandong
- Qiji, Shanxi (七级), in Linyi County, Shanxi
