= Panji =

Panji may refer to:

== Geography ==
- Panji District (潘集区), Huainan, Anhui, China
  - Panji Town (潘集镇), a town in Panji District
- Panji (subdistrict), Situbondo Regency, East Java, Indonesia
- Way Panji, South Lampung Regency, Lampung, Indonesia

== Entertainment ==
- Panji tales, a cycle of Javanese folk stories
- Panji Koming, an Indonesian cartoon appearing in Kompas

== Other uses ==
- Panjis or Panji Prabandh, genealogical records maintained among Maithil Brahmins and Karna Kayasthas of Mithila region of north Bihar, India
- Raden Panji, a Javanese title used by noblemen from Pasuruan Regency
- Panjika or Panji, a Hindu astronomical almanac

== See also ==
- Panaji, or Panjim, a city in Goa, India
- Bikash Panji, Indian football player
- João Panji, East Timor football player
