= NIHE =

NIHE or Nihe may refer to:

- National Institute for Higher Education in the Republic of Ireland
- Northern Ireland Housing Executive
- Niya (kingdom), an old kingdom in the current Syria
- Nihe, Huainan, a town in Panji District, Huainan
- Nihe, Hefei, a town in Lujiang County, Hefei
