= Nihe, Huainan =

Town in Anhui, China

Nihe 泥河镇
- Town
- Interactive map of Nihe
- Coordinates: 32°48′52″N 116°53′58″E
- Country: People's Republic of China
- Province: Anhui
- Prefecture-level city: Huainan
- District: Panji
- Time zone: UTC+8 (China Standard)

Nihe (Chinese: 泥河镇) is a town in the northeastern part of Panji District. Nihe is adjacent to Jiagou Township in the east, across the river from Gugou Hui Township in the south, bordering Panji Town in the west, and Huaiyuan County in the north. The population is 36670. Nihe has a total area of 4996 hectares. The Ni River and Hei River run through Nihe, and Provincial Highway 225 runs through Nihe too. Coal is abundant. The Sungrow Huainan Solar Farm is located here.

== Administrative divisions ==
The town governs 15 villages, 2 communities: Meiyuan Community, Liuye Community, Daimiao Village, Dianji Village, Daying Village, Taowang Village, Wafang Village, Daxu Village, Houhu Village, Xiejie Village, Xuhu Village, Yangliu Village, Heituli Village, Zhenxing Village, Zhonghuang Village, Huangxu Village and Dashuli Village.

== Amenities ==
There are 2 hospitals, 3 middle schools, 12 elementary schools, 1 kindergarten, 1 stadium, and 1 cinema in Nihe.
