= Huangdi Yinfujing =

Daoist scripture

The Huangdi Yinfujing (Chinese: 黃帝陰符經; pinyin: Huángdì Yīnfújīng; Wade–Giles: Huang-ti Yin-fu Ching; lit. 'Yellow Emperor's Hidden Talisman Classic'), or Yinfujing, is a circa 8th century CE Daoist scripture associated with Chinese astrology and Neidan-style Internal alchemy. In addition, Huangdi Yinfujing is also the name of a Chinese Fengshui text on military strategy.

== Texts ==
There are two received versions of the Daoist Huangdi Yinfujing, a shorter text of 332 Chinese characters in one section and a longer one of 445 in three sections. Both versions of this classic explain cosmological correspondences, the Dao of Heaven, Yin and Yang, the Wu Xing, and biospiritual techniques. In the description of Alexander Wylie, "This short Treatise, which is not entirely free from the obscurity of Tâoist mysticism, professes to reconcile the decrees of Heaven with the current of mundane affairs." In the explanation of the modern Daoists Zhang Jiyu and Li Yuanguo,

The Huangdi yinfu jing (The Yellow Emperor's Scripture on "Unconscious Unification") reflects this later stage of Daoist thought and attempts to "expose heaven's mysteries and reveal divinity's workings." It became one of the most important classics of Daoism, second only in significance to the Daode jing. Zhang Boduan (987–1082), in his Wuzhen pian (An Essay on Realizing Perfection), said: "The treasured Yinfu jing consists of more than three hundred words whereas the inspired Daodejing has five thousand characters. All those who attained immortality in the past and attain it in the present have comprehended the true meaning of these scriptures."

The Huangdi Yinfujing's date of composition is uncertain. Some scholars believed it existed prior to the Zhou dynasty (1122–256 BCE), while others believe it is a forgery from the Tang dynasty (618–907 CE). The traditional Chinese belief, as well as the eponymous title, ascribed this classic to the legendary Chinese sovereign Huangdi "Yellow Emperor". According to literary legend, in 441 CE the Daoist reformer Kou Qianzhi hid the Huangdi Yinfujing in a cave near Mount Song, where it was discovered by the Tang military official Li Quan (fl. ca. 743 CE). Li transcribed the text and published it with his commentary (Yinfujing Jie 陰符經解). There is consensus among contemporary scholars that Li probably forged the text, which is confirmed by the absence of references in pre-Tang sources. Despite this comparatively late date, the Huangdi Yinfujing is considered a Chinese classic, and collections like the Daozang and Siku Quanshu include various editions and commentaries.

During the Song dynasty, the Huangdi Yinfujing was canonized by the Quanzhen "Complete Perfection" school of Neidan internal alchemy. Liu Chuxuan 劉處玄 (1147–1203), founder of the Suishan (隨山 "Mount Sui") lineage, wrote a commentary, and Qiu Chuji 丘處機 (1148–1227), founder of the Longmen (龍門 "Dragon Gate") lineage, wrote another. Xia Yuanding 夏元鼎 (fl. 1201) wrote a textual exegesis. The analytical commentary (Yinfujing Kaoyi 陰符經考異) dubiously attributed to the leading Neo-Confucian scholar Zhu Xi first suggested that Li forged the text.

Qing dynasty scholars used philological methods to analyze classical texts. Liu Yiming 劉一明 (1734–1821), the 11th Longmen Daoist patriarch, wrote an erudite commentary. Acker published an annotated translation of Liu. Li Xiyue 李西月 (1806–1856), leader in the "Western School" (西派) of Neidan, also wrote a commentary.

== Military text ==
Besides the above Daoist Huangdi Yinfujing 黃帝陰符經, there is another military text by the same name. It contains 602 characters in 86 rhymed lines, and is a type of strategy manual based on the Qimen Dunjia (奇門遁甲 "Strange Gates Escaping Techniques") method of Fengshui. Ho Peng Yoke explains the title.

Yinfu 陰符 (secret tally), according to a military text entitled Liutao 六韜 (Six Strategies) and attributed to Jiang Shang 姜尚 in the eleventh century BC, refers to the tallies of various specified lengths used between the emperor and his generals for confidential communication. For example, the tally used to report a conquest in war had a length of one Chinese foot, that to report a victory in battle had a length of nine Chinese inches, that for reporting the occupation of an enemy city was eight Chinese inches long, and so on.

== Translations ==
The Huangdi yinfujing classic has been translated into English, French, Italian, Portuguese, German, Russian, and Japanese.

The first English versions were published during the Victorian era. Frederic H. Balfour initially translated the Yinfujing within his Taoist Texts. James Legge translated the text and Li Xiyue's commentary as an appendix to The Texts of Taoism.

More recent English translations and studies reflect insights from modern Sinology, as surveyed by Reiter. Christopher Rand's article on Li Quan translates and interprets the Huangdi Yinfujing as a treatise on Chinese military strategy. Thomas Cleary published a popular translation with Liu Yiming's commentary. Another English translation was published by Fabrizio Pregadio. It includes the commentary by Yu Yan (1258–1314), a learned author of works on Neidan and Chinese cosmology.

== Title ==
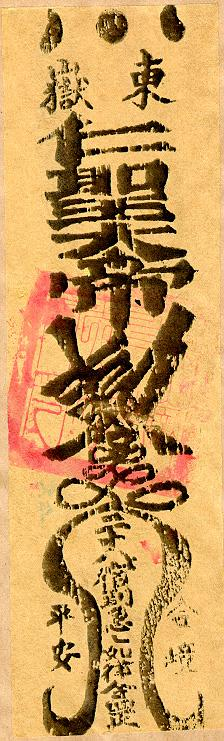
A Daoist fulu talisman

The title Huangdi Yinfujing combines three Chinese words. The first Huangdi 黃帝 "Yellow Emperor" and last jing 經 "classic; scripture; book" are common in titles of other Chinese classic texts. For example, the Huangdi Neijing "Yellow Emperor's Inner Classic" and Huangdi Sijing "Yellow Emperor's Four Classics". The second word yinfu "hidden/secret talisman/correspondence" is an uncommon compound of yin 陰 (of yin and yang) "shady place; passive; negative; secret; hidden" and fu 符 " tally (with two halves); talisman; symbol; charm; amulet".

Fu means a seal, divided into two parts. On one half of this seal we have the visible phenomena of the world around us; this we can all see, but, the diagram being incomplete, we require the other half of the seal, that bearing the 道理 [daoli "principle, truth; reason"] of Heaven or the Unseen World, before we can understand the why and the wherefore of the existing order of things.

Fulu 符籙 "Daoist secret talismanic writing; Daoist magic formulas" refers to charms written in peculiar characters, often on yellow paper (for instance, see jiangshi).

English translations of Yinfujing illustrate semantic problems with the title:

- Clue to the Unseen
- Classic of the Harmony of the Seen and the Unseen
- Scripture for Joining with Obscurity
- Scripture of the Hidden Contracts
- Classic on Yin Convergence
- Scripture on "Unconscious Unification"
- Secret Military Warrant Manual
- Scripture on the Hidden Talisman
- Scripture on the Hidden Fitness
- Scripture of Hidden Contracts
- Book of the Hidden Agreement

Note the omission of Huangdi above, which all the translators render as "Yellow Emperor", excepting Komjathy's "Yellow Thearch".

== See also ==
- Fulu
