= Shengtai =

Chinese metaphor in Buddhism and Daoism

Shengtai (Sacred Embryo)
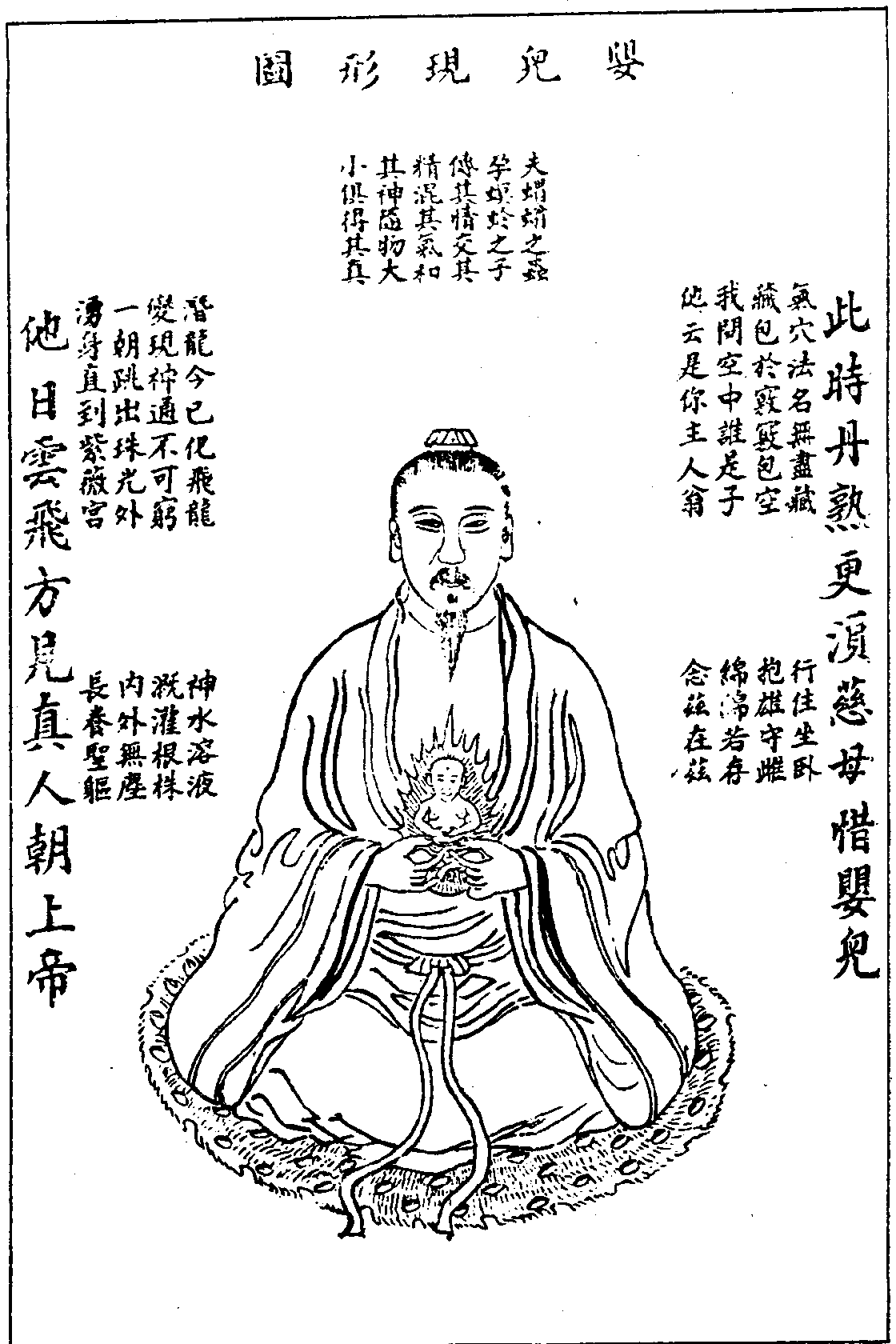
- 1615 illustration of the neidan meditation Ying'er xianxing (嬰兒現形; "Generating the Infant")

Chinese name
- Traditional Chinese: 聖胎
- Simplified Chinese: 圣胎
- Literal meaning: sacred/sage womb/embryo
Transcriptions
Standard Mandarin
- Hanyu Pinyin: shèngtāi
- Wade–Giles: sheng-t'ai
Yue: Cantonese
- Jyutping: sing^{3}toi^{1}
Middle Chinese
- Middle Chinese: syengH thoj
Old Chinese
- Baxter–Sagart (2014): *l̥eŋ-s sək

Korean name
- Hangul: 성태
- Hanja: 聖胎
Transcriptions
- McCune–Reischauer: seongtae

Japanese name
- Kanji: 聖胎
- Hiragana: しょうたい
Transcriptions
- Revised Hepburn: shōtai

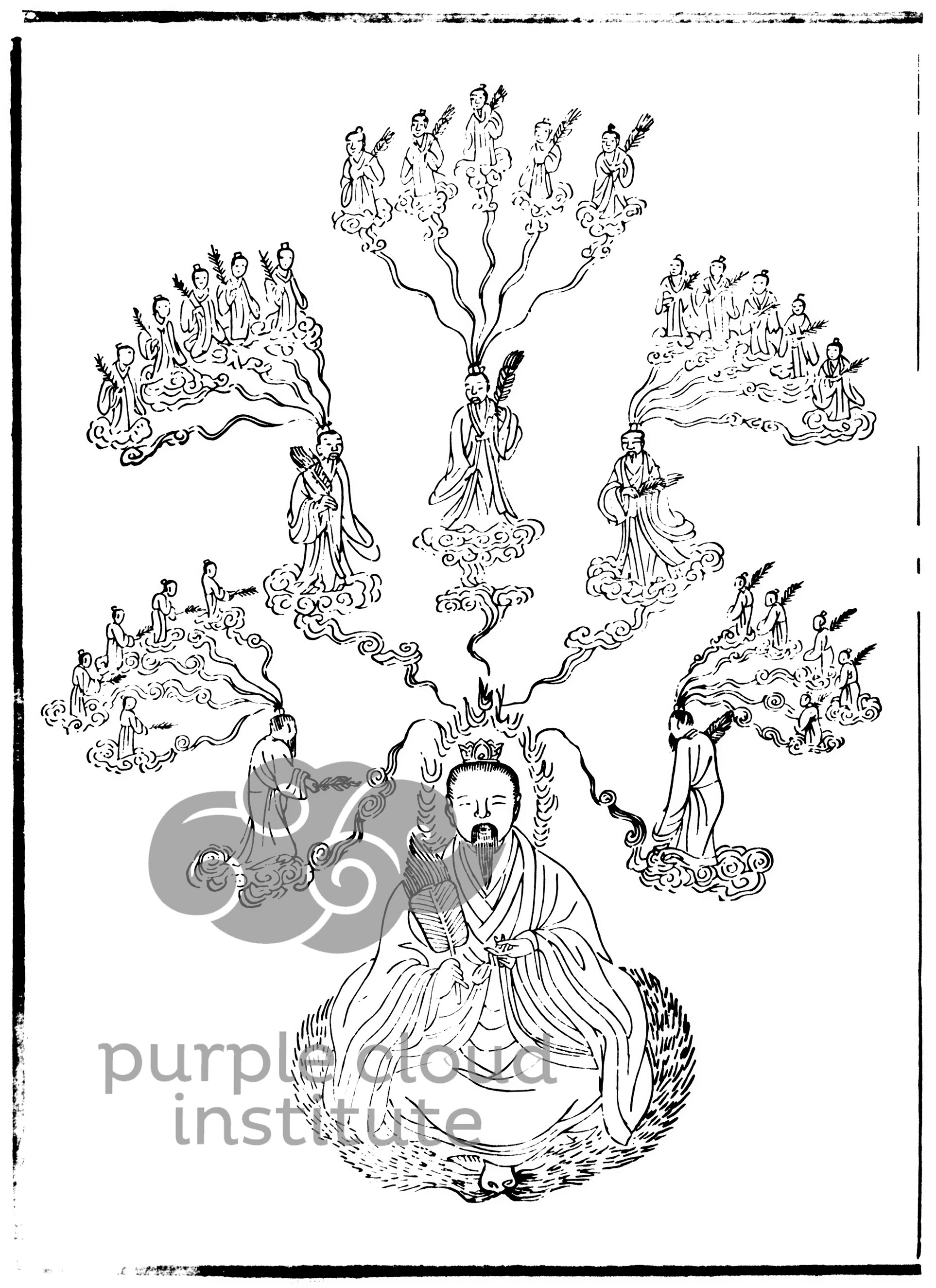
Yang spirit leaving the body

Shengtai (Chinese: 聖胎, "sacred embryo" or "embryo of sagehood") is a Chinese syncretic metaphor for achieving Buddhist liberation or Daoist transcendence. The circa fifth century CE Chinese Buddhist Humane King Sutra first recorded shengtai ("sagely womb") describing the bodhisattva path towards attaining Buddhahood; shengtai was related to the ancient Traditional Chinese Medical view of conception involving what is called the " Palace of the Child" 胞宫 (bāo gōng) and the Heart/Mind connection through the Bao Mai pathway that connects the kidney jing,天癸 (Tian Gui) or essence with the Shen or Spirit, this became the concept of cultivation of right mind in Chinese Mahayana Buddhism particularly Chan or latter Zen as expressed by Venerable Xiè'ēn a Chinese Buddhist medical physician. this is also called ("embryo/womb of the Buddha", Chinese Chinese: 如來藏; pinyin: rulaizang) that all sentient beings are born with the Buddha-nature potential to become enlightened. The Chan Buddhist teaching master Mazu Daoyi (709–788) first mentioned post-enlightenment zhangyang shengtai (長養聖胎; "nurturing the sacred embryo"), and by the tenth century Chan monks were regularly described as recluses nurturing their sacred embryo in isolated locations. The renowned Daoist Zhang Boduan (984–1082) was first to use the expression shengtai ("sagely embryo") in a context of physiological neidan Internal Alchemy, and neidan adepts developed prolonged meditation techniques through which one can supposedly become pregnant, gestate, and give birth to a spiritually perfected doppelganger.

== Terminology ==
Chinese shengtai (聖胎) is a linguistic compound of two common words:

- Shèng (聖)
1. peerless, incomparable, uniquely endowed; paragon; a conventional epithet for sovereign ....
2. possessing wisdom, judgment, and moral excellence; profoundly wise and virtuous; sage(ly), sagacious; [Buddhism] holy, sacred; holy person, saint ....
3. master practitioner of an art ...

The second meaning can refer to Buddha or Buddhism, for instance, rùshèng (入聖; "become an arhat").

- Tāi (胎)
1. fetus, embryo; womb; something encapsulated like a fetus.
2. embryonic, fetal; source, origin; e.g., (Daoism) 胎息 tāixī, embryonic breathing, technique of "pneuma circulation" 行氣; xingqi in which an adept breathes in stillness, without using nose or mouth, as when in the womb; early stage of development; something in an unfinished state.
3. give birth to; spawn; congenital. ...

Chinese tāi (胎) can ambiguously be translated as English embryo, fetus, or womb. The Chinese lexicon differentiates this semantic field with bāo (胞; "womb; placenta"), ēi (胚; "embryo"), pēitāi (胚胎; "embryo; beginning of things"), tāi'ér (胎兒; "fetus; embryo"), and zǐgōng (子宮; 'child palace'; "uterus; womb").

The unabridged Hanyu Da Cidian ("Comprehensive Chinese Word Dictionary"), which is lexicographically comparable to the Oxford English Dictionary, defines shengtai with two meanings:

1. 圣人之胎。 [Fetus/embryo of a sage/buddha.]
2. 道教金丹的别名。内丹家以母体结胎比喻凝聚精﹑气﹑神三者所炼成之丹﹐故名。 [Alternate name for the pill of immortality in Daoist religion. The Internal Alchemy school uses a mother's body forming an embryo as a metaphor for the elixir made by condensing essence, qi, and spirit, hence the name.]

There is no standard English translation for Chinese shengtai and scholars have rendered it as:

- "divine embryo"
- "holy embryo"
- "Embryo of Sainthood" or "Sacred Embryo"
- "Embryo of Sainthood"
- "sagely embryo" or "embryo of sainthood"
- "sagely embryo"
- "saintly embryo"
- "embryo of sagehood"
- "holy fetus"

"Autogestation" is Christine Mollier's unique translation, "the generation of an embryo of immortality, the germ of a perfect being, develops within the practitioner's body through a process of 'autogestation' that can be labelled as an internal sexual alchemy".

In Daoist terminology, shengtai Sacred Embryo has several synonyms, including xuanzhu (玄珠; "Mysterious Pearl"), shenzhu (神珠; "Spiritual Pearl"), ying'er (嬰兒; "Infant"), chizi (赤子; "Red Child"), and daotai (道胎; "Embryo of the Dao").

== Indian Buddhism ==
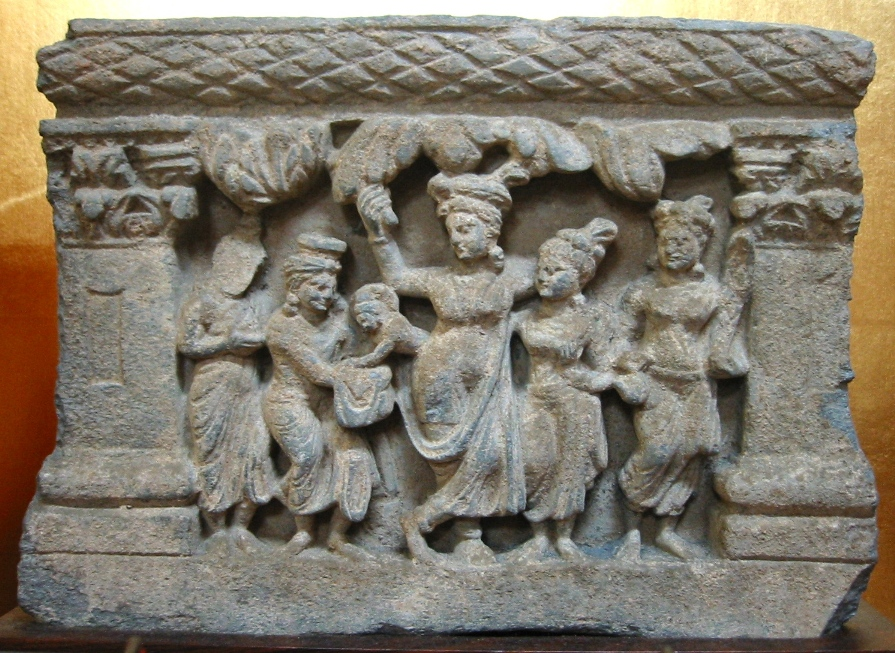
Gandharan sculpture (2nd-3rd centuries CE) showing the Buddha being born from Queen Māyā's side

The Chinese Buddhist word shengtai (聖胎; "sacred embryo") was associated with the better-known Indian Mahayana Buddhist concept of tathāgatagarbha ("embryo/womb of the tathāgata [i.e., Buddha]") referring to the inherent potential of any sentient being to become a buddha.

Tathāgata is a Pali word (meaning "one who has thus come/gone") that Gautama Buddha uses when referring to himself or other Buddhas in the Pāli Canon, and translated as Chinese rulai (如來; "thus come"). Garbha is a Sanskrit word (meaning "womb; fetus; embryo; child; interior; inside"), sharing the ambiguity of Chinese tai (胎; "womb; fetus; embryo"). Buddhist scholars translated tathāgatagarbha into the "awkward Chinese phrase" rulaizang (如來藏; 'storehouse of the thus-come one') with zàng (藏; "storehouse, depository, treasury; bury; internal organs, viscera"), thus, the sexual and gestational connotations of the Indian Buddhist "doctrine of the embryo of the thus-come one were lost in translation".

Many Indian Buddhist scriptures portrayed the female body, especially the womb, as impure, and characterized fetal gestation as the "focal point of human suffering", representing the cosmic misery of saṃsāra ("cyclical birth and death"). In response, Buddhists also developed elaborate legends about the Buddha Śākyamuni's supernatural birth. His mother Queen Māyā supposedly was impregnated while dreaming that a white elephant entered her body, her pregnancy was painless, and the Buddha was born from underneath her right arm. These narrative elements helped establish the Buddha not only as different from ordinary people but more specifically as "impervious to the pollution and suffering understood to ordinarily accompany sexual intercourse, fetal gestation, and birth".

The metaphysical terms of tathāgatagarbha ("embryo/matrix of the thus-come one") and Chinese shengtai ("sacred embryo") were closely related to the concept of Buddha-nature, Sanskrit buddhadhātu or Chinese foxing (佛性), the latent potential to achieve Buddhahood that lies dormant in all sentient beings.

== Medieval Chinese Buddhism ==
The Renwang jing (仁王經; "Humane King Sutra"), an apocryphal scripture composed around the fifth century during the Northern Wei dynasty (386–534), first used the expression shengtai (聖胎; "sagely embryo") describing the bodhisattva path towards attaining Buddhahood: "Buddhas and bodhisattvas cultivate and nourish the ten types of consciousness [十心; shixin] into a sagely embryo." While Indian Buddhist texts described the bodhisattva path as consisting of ten sequential stages or "grounds" (Sanskrit bhūmi, Chinese 地; di), the Chinese Renwang jing expanded this sequence to include thirty additional preliminary stages or "minds" (心; xin), resulting in a much longer path towards enlightenment. These thirty minds that precede entry into the ten grounds, "constitute an intermediate sequence of stages during which the aspirant's sagehood is already 'conceived' but nevertheless still 'embryonic'". According to the Humane King Sutra,

"In these [first ten minds], the bodhisattva is capable of transforming sentient beings in small measure and has already surpassed all of the good stages of the [lesser] two vehicles. All buddhas and bodhisattvas [in the course of their development] nurture these ten minds, which constitute an embryo of sagehood."

Instead of the transitional shengtai encompassing only the first ten minds, a subsequent passage more broadly associates it with all thirty,

"[As for] the embryo of sagehood's thirty stages of patiently subduing [passions], [Namely] the ten faiths, ten cessations, and ten firm minds, Among all buddhas of the three times [past, present, and future] who have practiced within [them], There are none who were not born from this patient subjugation [of passions]."

These two quotes show that the Chinese concept of shengtai ("embryo of sagehood") is entirely different from the Indian Buddhist concept of tathāgatagarbha or Chinese rulaizang ("embryo of the thus-come one"), which is equivalent to foxing ("buddha-nature"). While buddha-nature refers to the universal buddhahood inherent in all sentient beings, the Renwang jing discusses shengtai as specifically referring to an exceptional aspirant's progress on sagely fetal growth along the bodhisattva path.

The Chinese term shengtai never seems to have been used to translate the Sanskrit word tathāgatagarbha despite their apparent similarities. In Chinese Buddhism, "sage" (Sanskrit ārya, Chinese 聖; sheng) and "thus-come one" (tathāgata, 如來; rulai) are standard epithets for buddhas; and both Sanskrit garbha and Chinese tai can ambiguously mean either "womb" or "embryo". The most comprehensive Chinese-language collection of the Buddha's biographies, the sixth-century Fo benxingji jing), uses the term shengtai referring to the embryonic Buddha Śākyamuni within Queen Māyā's womb, which suggests that some Chinese Buddhists may have connected the embryo of sagehood to the Buddha's miraculous fetal gestation.

Shengtai and rulaizang were not used interchangeably in China, and there was a verbal contrast in their usages. On the one hand, a "soteriology of sudden liberative vision" was associated with the words rulaizang "embryo of the thus-come one" or foxing "buddha-nature", typically used with the Chinese verbs guan (觀; "to view; look at; watch") or jian (見; "to see; to appear"). For example, the popular Chinese Buddhist saying that jianxing chengfo (見性成佛; "seeing one's [buddha-]nature and becoming a buddha"). With the understanding that cheng (成; "becoming") a buddha is instantaneous, it is categorically all or nothing. On the other, a "soteriology of gradual development" was associated with the shengtai "embryo (or womb) of sagehood". Medieval Chinese Buddhist texts did not mention "seeing" the shengtai, but rather used the verbs ru (入; "to enter"), tuo (托; 託; "to conceive"), chu (出; "to be born from"), and most commonly yang (養) or zhangyang (長養) (to nurture). "Nurturing the embryo of sagehood" derives from the ancient prenatal concept of yangtai (養胎; "nurturing the embryo"). These verbs illustrate that shengtai "the embryo of sagehood" retained closer semantic connections to literal embryology than did the "embryo of the thus-come one", which was understood in China as equivalent to buddha-nature.

Vasubandhu's (Shiqin 世親, fl. 300–400) Daśabhūmikasūtra śāstra (十地經論; Shidi jing lun; "Treatise on the Ten Stages Sutra") describes the Ten Stages of the original Indian Buddhist path of the bodhisattva as being "like pregnancy in a womb" (如孕在藏). The Chinese Buddhist scholar-monk Fashang (法上, 495–580) explains,

"[The phrase] "like pregnancy in a womb" takes women as an example and takes pregnancy as a metaphor. In the first month, [a pregnant woman] carries the embryo, and after ten [lunar] months, [the embryo] is completely developed. Bodhisattvas are also like this: in the first ground, they attain the embryo of sagehood [聖之胎], and in the tenth ground, the body of sagehood [聖體] is completely developed."

Instead of following the Renwang jing sequence of thirty minds preceding entry into the ten grounds/stages, Fashang connects the embryo of sagehood to the earlier Indian Buddhist understanding of the unfolding bodhisattva path as consisting only of the ten grounds themselves, with each progressive month of pregnancy corresponding to one ground.

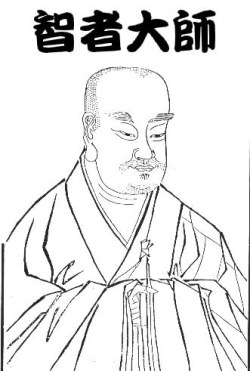
Zhiyi, the fourth patriarch of Tiantai Buddhism

The 594 Mohe Zhiguan (摩訶止觀), Great [Manual of] Calming and Contemplation) Buddhist doctrinal summa, based on lectures given by Zhiyi (538–597), the fourth patriarch of Tiantai Buddhism, discusses shengtai ("embryo / womb of sagehood") meditation in terms of the sanfa (三法; "three kinds of dharma": precepts, concentration, and wisdom").

Practitioners who skillfully regulate these three matters cause [themselves] to be conceived within the womb of sagehood. Because the activity of their minds is not yet fully under their command, they ought to apply their minds to bringing together the father and mother of skillful means and the perfection of wisdom [respectively], who will conceive [them] within the womb of sagehood. Why would [such practitioners] allow themselves to be conceived within the wombs of denizens of hell, the three [unfortunate] destinies, or the realms of humans or gods?

Zhiyi interprets shengtai not just as an analogy for gradually growing enlightenment but as a literal site for rebirth, that should be considered highly preferable to rebirth in the destinies of samsara.

Zhiyi also uses shengtai to explain busheng sheng (不生生; "nonbirth-birth") that the Mahāyāna Mahāparinirvāṇa Sūtra describes as "peacefully abiding in worldly truth, when someone first emerges from the womb, this is called 'nonbirth-birth'."

Now to explain "worldly truth." [This term refers to] when ignorance combines with dharma nature and all kinds of [mistaken] separations and distinctions are produced [in the mind]; thus it is called "worldly truth." As for "peacefully abiding," if by means of calming and contemplation [that is, meditation], one abides peacefully in worldly truth, then it [worldly truth] becomes an inconceivable object, and the stage of practicing observation is completed; thus it is called "peacefully abiding." Because one peacefully abides, [this stage of practice] is called "being conceived within the womb of sagehood." When one first activates one's buddha knowledge and [buddha] vision and recognizes that [all things] are unborn (無生忍; wusheng ren), this stage is called "exiting [or, being born from] the womb of sagehood." Because [at this stage] one does not see worldly truth [through the lens of] ignorance, [the sutra] says "not born." Because one obtains buddha knowledge and buddha vision, [the sutra] says "born." The [Great Wisdom] Treatise (大智度論; Dazhidulun) says: "all dharmas are not born, but prajna is born," which is the [same] meaning [as the sutra's nonbirth-birth].

Zhiyi's disciple Guanding (灌頂, 561–632) explains that "Peacefully abiding in worldly truth" has two meanings. Exoterically, it denotes the time from first thinking of conception in a womb until death. Esoterically, it means a bodhisattva who is at the stage of cultivating skillful means, which reiterates Zhiyi's notion of worldly truth as a womb within which the practitioner grows as a bodhisattva. "When cultivation gives rise to realization and ignorance is destroyed, this [moment] constitutes the first emergence from the womb; it is also nirvana, which is beginningless and yet is said thenceforth to begin.

== Chan Buddhism ==
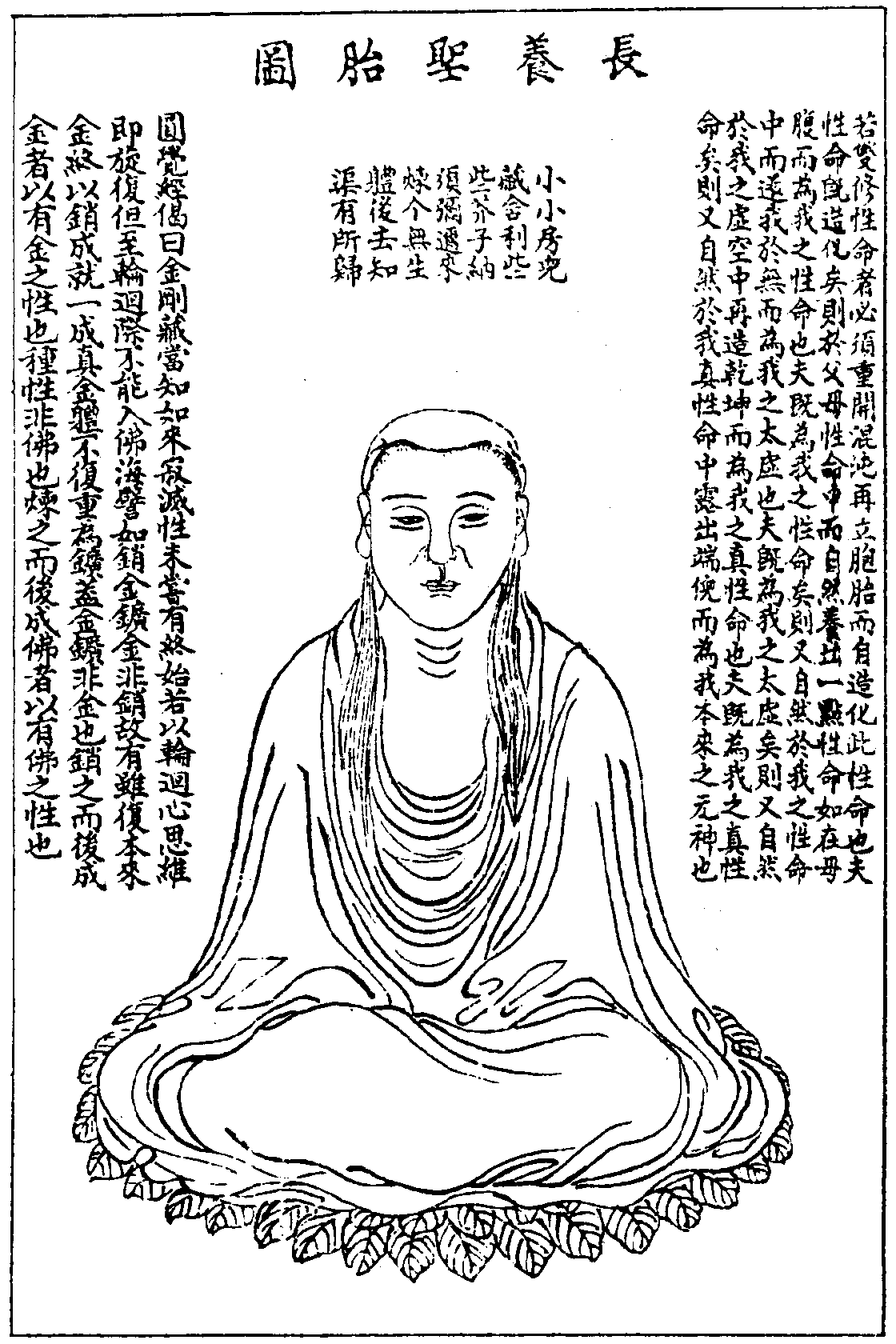
Woodcut illustration of a female Daoist adept practicing Zhangyang shengtai (長養聖胎; "Nurturing the Sacred Embryo"), 1615 Xingming guizhi, "Principles of Balanced Cultivation of Inner Nature and Vital Force"

With the rise of Chan Buddhism from the Tang through Song dynasties, Buddhist religious authority began to shift from translated and apocryphal Buddhist scriptures to the recorded sayings of indigenous Chinese Chan masters, and Chan tradition emphasized sudden over gradual enlightenment, namely, jianxing chengfo (見性成佛; "seeing one's [buddha-]nature and [instantly] becoming a buddha").

The earliest recorded Chan usage of shengtai is in Mazu Daoyi's (709–788) famous sermon about jixin shi fo (即心是佛; "this very mind is Buddha"). The 952 Zutang ji (祖堂集; "Anthology of the Patriarchal Hall") version mentions zhangyang shengtai (長養聖胎; "Nurturing the Sacred Embryo"):

What the heart/mind produces is called form. When one realizes that form is empty, production becomes nonproduction. Having understood this, one can act according to circumstances, dressing, eating, developing and maintaining the sagely embryo (shengtai), and living in harmony with spontaneity.

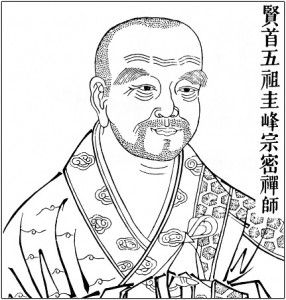
Guifeng Zongmi, fifth patriarch of the Heze school

The Tang scholar-monk Guifeng Zongmi (780–841), fifth patriarch of the Heze school in Southern Chan Buddhism, criticizes the apparent contradiction between Mazu's using the shengtai sacred embryo trope while claiming that enlightenment is instantaneous and need not be developed, Zongmi asks, "[Buddha-]nature is like empty space, neither growing nor diminishing. By what means could it be supplemented?" Zongmi also mentions "feeding the soul and making the sagely embryo grow [養神聖胎增長]" in his Chanyuan zhu quan ji duxu (禪源諸全集都序; "Preface to a Collection of Texts on the Origins of Chan"). Gufeng Zongmi notes the figurative resemblance between the embryo of sagehood and the impregnation of the storehouse consciousness—the eighth of the Eight Consciousnesses in the Yogācāra philosophical tradition, which is said to store the impressions (vāsanāḥ) of previous experiences, which form the seeds (bīja) of future karma in this life and in subsequent rebirths. His later commentary on the Sutra of Perfect Enlightenment Yuanjue jing (圓覺經) says, the "awakened mind is the embryo of sagehood".

When by means of but a single thought one awakens to this perfect and wondrous mind, the storehouse consciousness (ālāyavijñāna) is thereupon impregnated with the seed of sagehood [熏成聖種], though conditions have not yet brought it to external manifestation; thus, it is like the beginning of pregnancy.

Although Zhiyi (above) argued that the embryo of sagehood could be conceived through nothing more than proper meditation, Zongmi equated the embryo of sagehood with the awakened mind, metaphysically explained as the seeds of Buddhahood impregnating one's storehouse consciousness in order attain liberation.

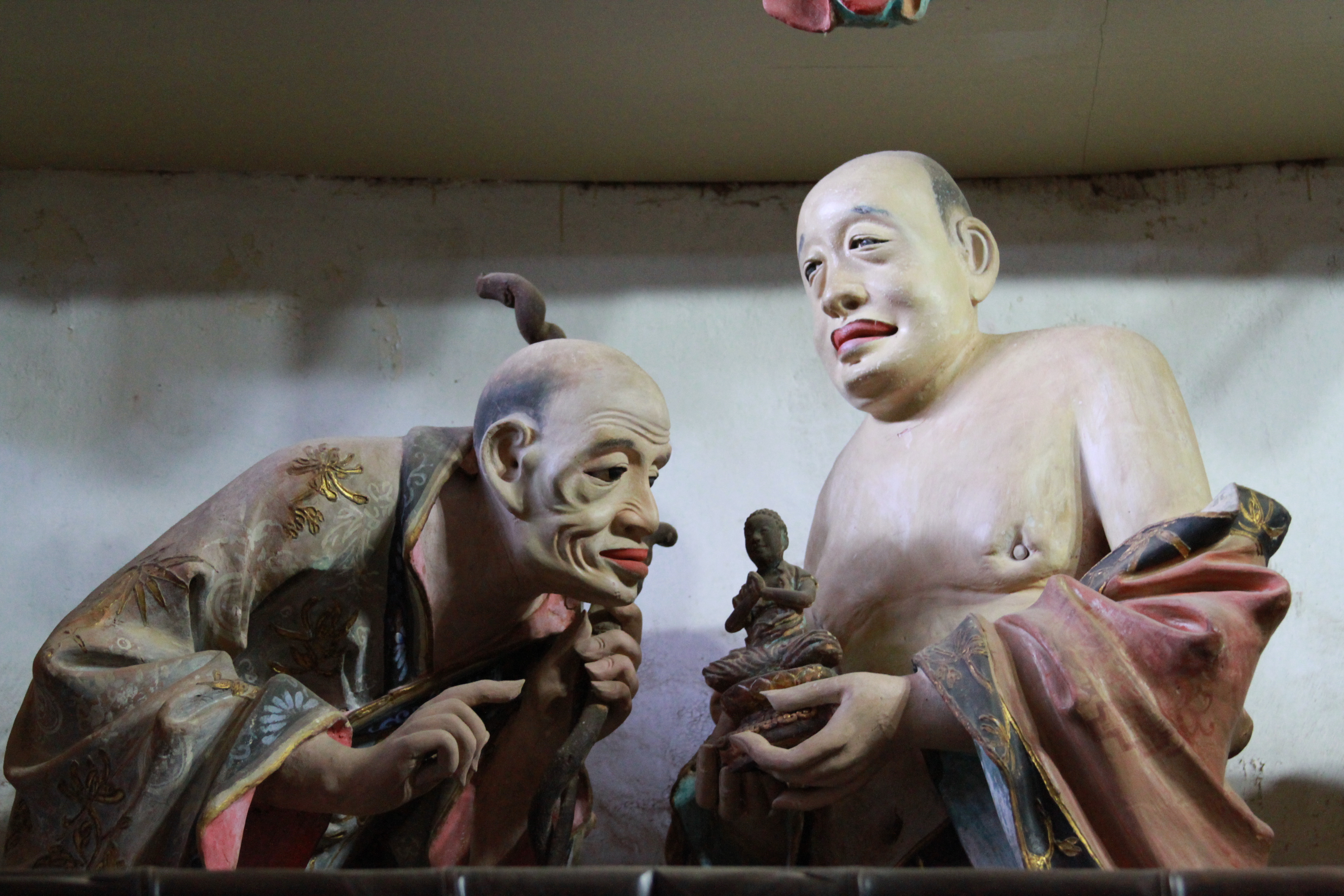
Qiongzhu Temple painted clay sculptures of one Buddhist Arhat looking at another's shengtai, created by Li Guangxiu (黎廣修) and his students between 1883 and 1890

By the tenth century, it became increasingly common for Chan monks to be described as recluses nurturing the embryo of sagehood in isolated forests or on mountains. For example, the poet-monk Qiji 齊己 (860–940) describes "sitting on stones, gazing at clouds, and nurturing the embryo of sagehood." Elsewhere, he recounts a trip to the stone bridge deep in the Tiantai Mountain mountains in search of the legendary Eighteen Arhats, who he imagines "sitting together on green cliffs, nurturing the embryo of sagehood."

According to the 988 Song gaoseng zhuan (宋高僧傳), Song-dynasty Biographies of Eminent Monks), when the wandering monk Zhifeng (智封) met Yuquan Shenxiu (605–706), "… the ice of his doubts melted away" and he decided to "nurture the embryo of sagehood [養聖胎]." He moved to the Anfeng mountains (present-day Shanxi), where he passed ten years, "eating from trees and drinking from streams." After the provincial governor Wei Wen learned of Zhifeng, he invited him to return to the city, where he took up abbacy of the new Anguo Monastery. "From that time on, he rushed about [performing public duties] in the padded robes [of a city monk]." Subsequently, it became a literary trope that after a Chan monk's enlightenment was certified through lineage transmission, they would nurture the embryo of sagehood during a period of reclusion or aimless wandering before returning to public life.

After the early Chinese Buddhist reception of the "embryo of sagehood" was guided by the metaphysics of spiritual pregnancy and buddha bodies, Chan Buddhists gave the concept a more markedly metaphorical character, and Daoist Inner Alchemy, which emerged closely after the rise of Chan, gave shengtai a new role of embodiment in the pursuit of religious liberation.

== Daoist Internal Alchemy ==
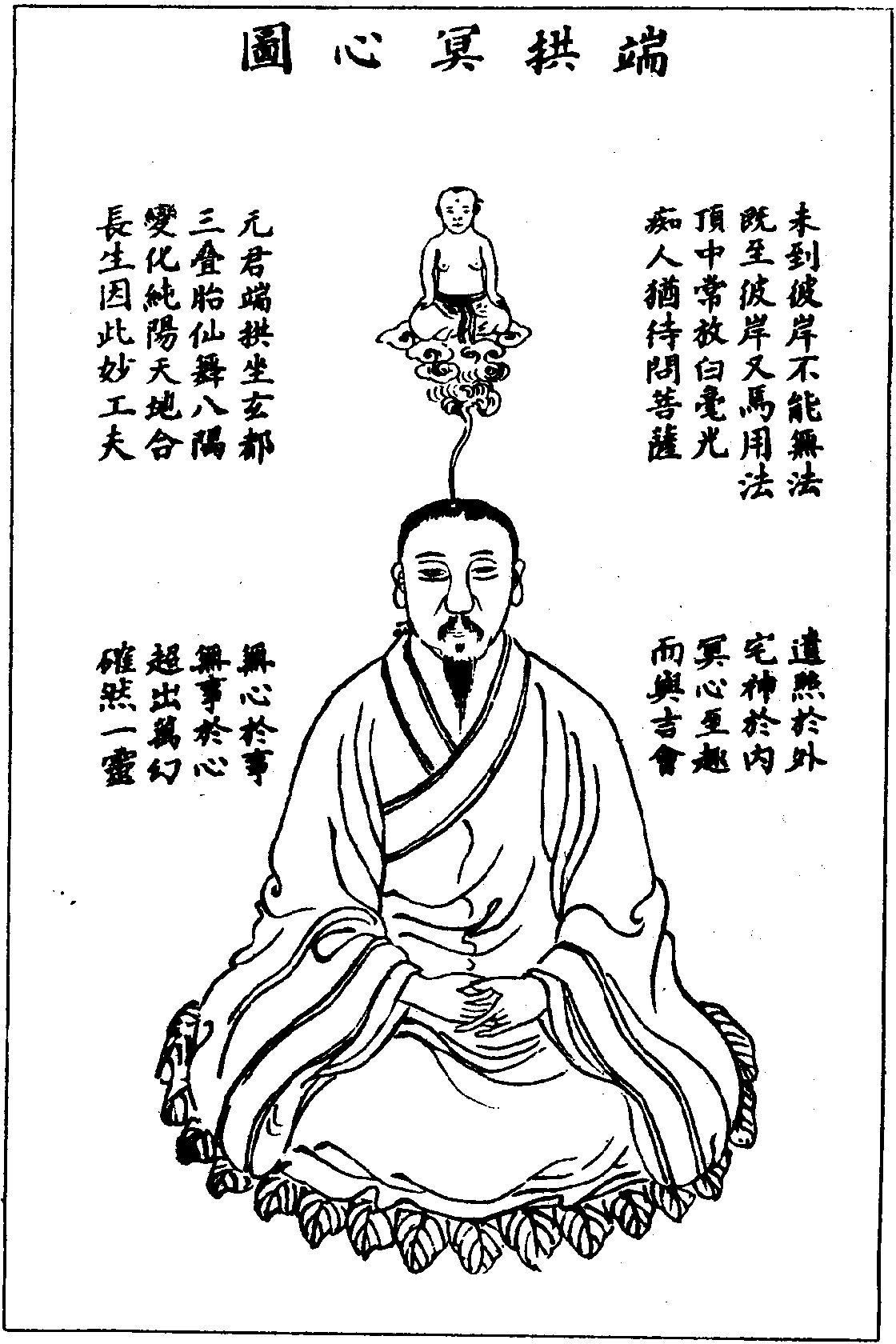
Illustration of neidan meditation Duangong mingxin (端拱冥心; "Sitting with Hands Clasped and Mind Undifferentiated"), 1615 Xingming guizhi (Principles of Balanced Cultivation of Inner Nature and Vital Force)

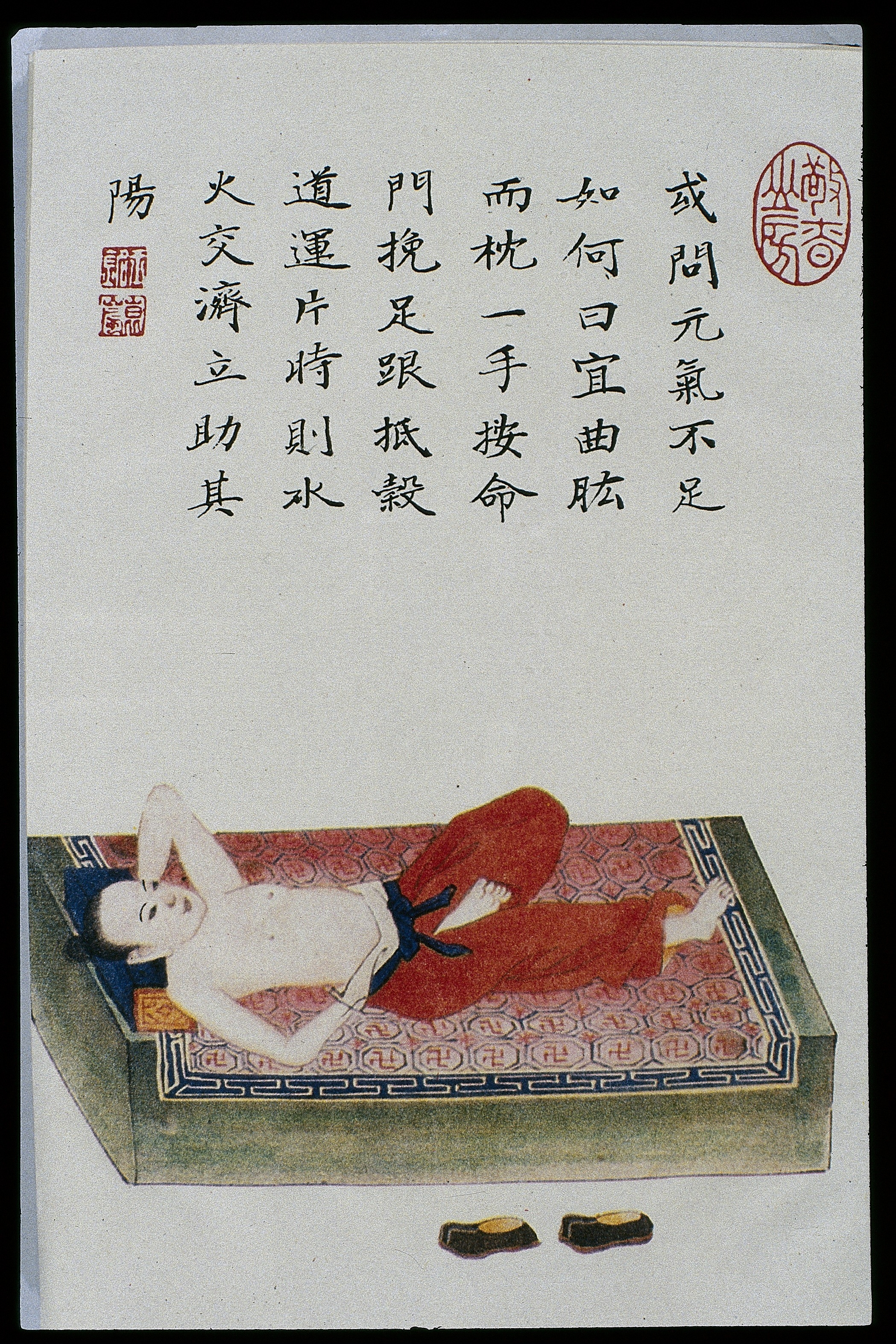
Daoyin technique for strengthening one's Yuanqi ("original qi"), Kun Lan's 1875 Daoyin tu (導引圖; "Drawings of Guiding and Pulling Qi Circulation")

During the Tang dynasty (618–907), the Daoist practice of psychophysiological Neidan (Internal/Inner Alchemy/Elixir) began to supersede the ancient, and sometimes dangerous, practice of chemical Waidan (External/Outer Alchemy/Elixir). Daoist Internal Alchemy practitioners developed the term shengtai "sacred embryo" into a complex process of symbolic pregnancy generating a spiritually perfected duplicate of oneself within oneself, which later became synonymous with the elixir of immortality in External Alchemy. This alchemical embryo "represents a new life, true and eternal in its quality".

In Internal Alchemy, the "sagely embryo" is an amalgam of Buddhist ideas concerning latent spiritual qualities that are developable through a symbolic birth leading to awakening, and Daoist ideas of accessing immortality through fan (反; "reversion") to the cosmic matrix. Fan (反; "return; reversion; inversion") is a basic concept in Daoist neidan alchemical literature, for example, the term fantai (反胎; "Returning to the embryo") refers to mentally repeating one's embryonic development, emphasizing "the return of the physical freshness and perfect vital force of infancy, childhood, and even fetal life". Returning to the origin, the womb, or the embryo implies the idea of "rebirth and renewal as a kind of countercurrent to ordinary life". In distinction to Buddhism emphasizing the spiritual or psychological dimensions of an adept's experience, Daoism focuses upon corporeal metaphors for the physical or psychophysiological sensations such as inner breathing, inner flows, and inner heat.

Although the gestational motif appears in Internal Alchemy texts around the middle of the Tang, it derives from earlier Buddhist (mentioned above) and Daoist contexts. Many Daoist classics mention embryonic and gestational motifs. A famous example is the circa fourth century BCE Daodejing praising infancy. "He who embodies the fullness of integrity is like a ruddy infant [含德之厚 比於赤子]. Wasps, spiders, scorpions, and snakes will not sting or bite him; Rapacious birds and fierce beasts will not seize him." "By being a ravine for all under heaven, Eternal integrity will never desert you [常德不離]. If eternal integrity never deserts you, You will return to the state of infancy [復歸於嬰兒]"; which suggests that "human vitality is fully charged upon parturition and constantly discharges with every natural cycle of breath". Both these words meaning "infant", chizi (赤子) and ying'er (嬰兒), sometimes refer to the embryo in Internal Alchemy.

The circa mid-second century CE Zhouyi cantong qi (Token for the Agreement of the Three According to the Book of Changes), a fundamental treatise on Inner Alchemy, poetically describes the birth of a spiritual embryo, which is usually connected with its transcendence of the mortal body.

Similar in kind to a hen's egg, the white [Yang] and the black [Yin] tally with one another. It is only one inch in size, but it is the beginning [of the sagely embryo]. Then, the four limbs, the five viscera, the sinews and bones join it. When the ten months have elapsed, it leaves its womb. Its bones are weak and pliant, its flesh is smooth like lead.

Although Daoist texts describe body-centered meditations that recall the various stages of embryonic development, they are nevertheless describing psychological or spiritual processes. The four stages in the allegorical development of the shengtai (聖胎; "sagely embryo") closely follow actual gestations: jietai (結胎; "formation of the embryo"); yang shengtai (養聖胎; "nourishing the embryo") for a duration of ten lunar months, corresponding to the 280 days of gestation according to traditional Chinese medical texts; tuotai (脫胎; 'liberation from the womb'; "delivery"); and rufu (乳哹; "breastfeeding") for three years.

Already in the second and third centuries, some Daoist writings referred to religious practices of peitai (培胎; "fostering the embryo") or of nurturing an infant god, called the chizi (赤子; "red child"), that resides inside the body. The Shangqing School scriptures, believed to have been revealed to Yang Xi in the late fourth-century, developed these practices into formalized and complex meditative procedures for visualizing one's own spiritual rebirth.

The fourth or fifth century Huangting neijing yujing zhu (黃庭內景經註), Commentary to the Scripture on the Inner Effulgences of the Yellow Court) has one of the earliest references to an allegorical embryo, "the embryo-immortal [胎仙] dances to the three couplets of the heart-lute."

The circa ninth-century Zhen longhu jiuxian jing (真龍虎九仙經; "Scripture of the Nine Transcendents and the Perfected Dragon and Tiger"), which contains commentaries attributed to Ye Fashan (616–720) and Luo Gongyuan (羅公遠, 618–758), instructs an adept to "imagine the true essence of the two kidneys merging into a single qi and the blood of the heart descending to combine [with it], whereupon the image of the infant is formed." The Ye commentary explains that the embryo of an immortal body is formed by visualizing the same jing (精; "semen") and xue (血; "blood") substances whose combination in sexual intercourse was understood to cause normal pregnancy. And the Luo-attributed commentary says that after creating the embryo of sagehood, one must fully refine the body of sagehood for ten months, after which it is capable of exiting the practitioner's physical body "from the crown of the head riding on a purple cloud and that it constitutes a second body identical in appearance to the material body."

In practices for transforming the body's energies, the formation of the embryo is closely related to the purification and merging of essence, energy, and spirit: jing, qi, and shen. Beyond this, texts of different eras define the embryo and explain its formation in various ways. The embryo as the perfected elixir can denote the zhenqi (真氣; "true energy") or yuanqi (元氣; "original energy") which, according to Zhong-Lü sources, achieves fullness after three hundred days of transformation.

The late Tang Zhong Lü chuandao ji (鍾呂傳道集; "Record of the Transmission of the Way from Zhong[li Quan] to Lü [Dongbin]") describes how "the medicinal ingredients of the neidan inner elixir come from the heart and kidneys, which all people possess." By combining them within oneself according to the proper timing and procedures, one "appropriates the efficacy of sexual intercourse between husband and wife, so that the embryo of sagehood is completed and true qi is born." As a result, "when the great medicine is complete, the yang spirit emerges and there is a body outside the body, like a cicada shedding its skin." This passage mixes alchemical and sexual themes. Its basic sequence involves manipulating bodily substances originally found in the heart and kidneys toward the center of the body, where they fuse together; then refining the resultant Inner Alchemy or embryo of sagehood (the two concepts are used interchangeably); and finally giving birth from the crown of the head to an immortal body, the yangshen (陽神; "yang spirit"). In these meditation exercises, the shen (神; "spirit") constitutes the adept's male component, that which becomes the Yang Spirit. Qi is the feminine component, relating to spirit not as a wife to a husband but rather as mother to a son.

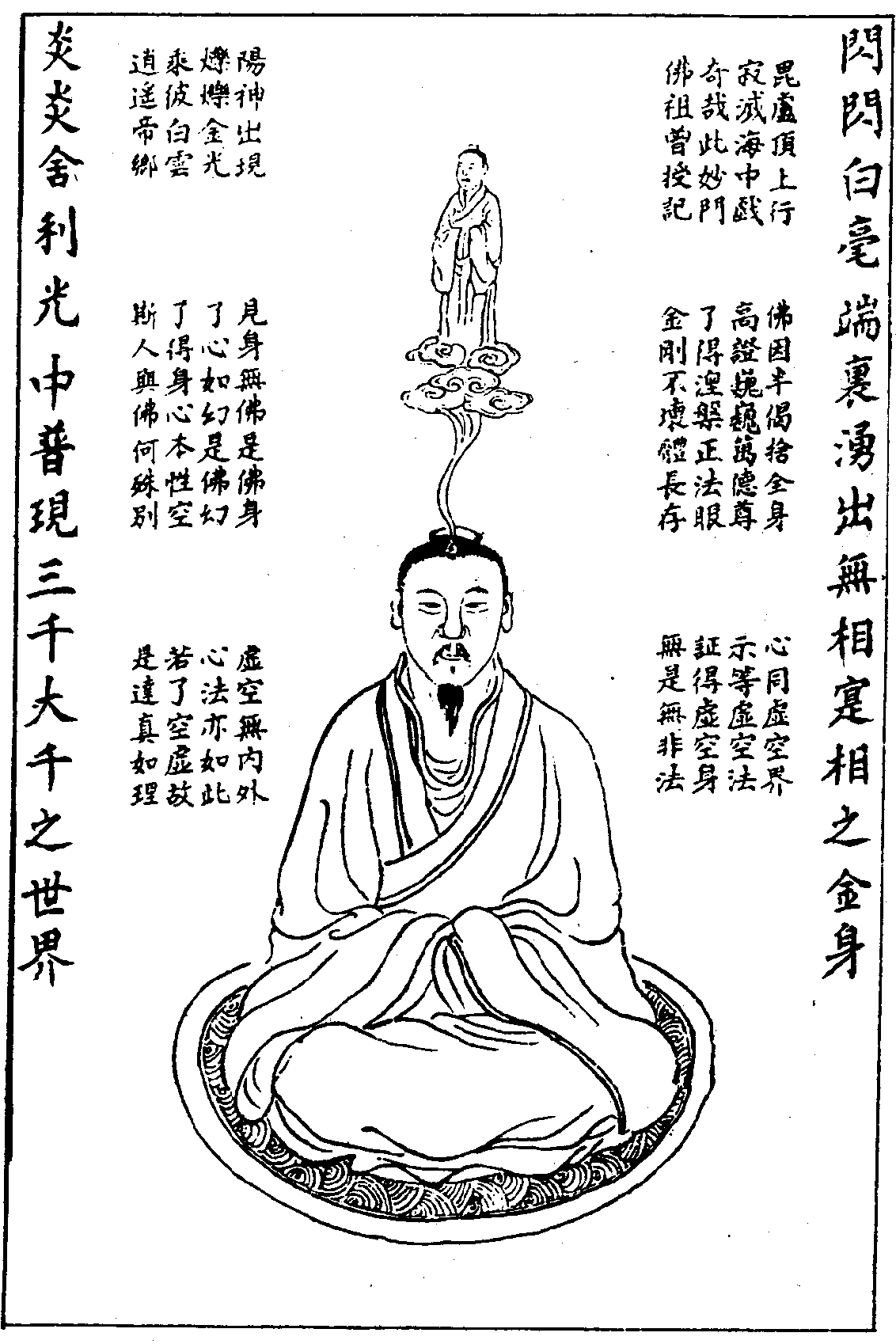
illustration of the neidan meditation Yangshen chuxian tu (陽神出現圖), Yang Spirit Appearing), 1615 Xingming guizhi (Principles of Balanced Cultivation of Inner Nature and Vital Force)

Zhang Boduan (987–1082), one of the most famous Inner Alchemists of the Song period, was the first to use the expression shengtai ("sagely embryo") in the context of Internal Alchemy, and the first to have explicitly referred to a symbolic pregnancy process. Even though Zhang extensively studied Chan texts, his work was "a synthesis of Buddhist and Daoist methods in which the former are assimilated to the latter, so that the final package is essentially Daoist". Zhang's advocacy of xingming shuangxiu (性命雙修; "dual cultivation of nature and lifespan") implies the inadequacy of any Buddhist practice that focuses exclusively on witnessing buddha-nature. Inner Alchemists regularly criticized Buddhists for focusing exclusively on jianxing (見性; "seeing their own [buddha] nature") while failing to cultivate ming (命; "lifespan; longevity"), they fail to fabricate the yang spirit and, in the end, become nothing more than yingui (陰鬼; "yin ghosts"). This is illustrated in the legend of Zhang Boduan's contest with a rival Buddhist master to see who could travel farther in an externalized spiritual body. The monk's Yin Spirit could leave his body during meditative trances, and after travelling to a faraway land and returning, he described its beautiful flowers. Not to be outdone, Zhang's Yang Spirit travelled to the same place the monk described, plucked an actual flower and returned with it. "In the great way of the Golden Elixir, life and nature are jointly cultivated. Thus, by accumulation, the body is accomplished, and by dispersion, qi is accomplished. In the place to which he travelled, Zhang's perfected soul was manifested in a body. This is what is called the 'Yang Spirit.'"

Zhang Boduan's 1075 Wuzhen pian (Folios on Awakening to Perfection) defines the embryo as the energy of the One. In this text, the embryo also represents the female within the male, i.e., the Yin of the human being that is enclosed and transformed by the Yang. A commentary to this text, the Wuzhen pian zhushi (悟真篇註釋, Annotated Commentary on the Stanzas on the Awakening to Perfection, ambiguously mentions the ying'er ("infant"), although the majority of alchemical sources refer to the shengtai ("sagely embryo"). "When the three families [essence (jing), qi, and soul (shen)] meet, the infant coalesces; the Infant is the One, holding true qi. […] After ten months, the embryo is complete; this is the foundation for entering sagehood."

The 1078 Chen xiansheng neidan jue (陳先生內丹訣; "Master Chen's Formulas on the Internal Elixir") details how the sagely embryo transforms into the adept's physically and mentally identical doppelganger:

When the numinous rotation [靈運] occurs in the sagely embryo, the face of the immortal is produced. The commentary says: "At the third revolution [of the Elixir], Yang is nourished and the visionary hun soul arises in the sagely embryo. At the fourth revolution, Yin is nourished and the po soul arises. When the Elixir reaches this point, the hun and the po are complete; the embryo's essence and spirit of the Five Peaks [its inner landscape] match with the appearance of one's inner body. The egress of the spirit is [the emergence of] one's true self."

The birth of the completed embryo, the perfect double, exits through the head in a process called the chushen (出神; "egress of the spirit"). It contrasts with conventional delivery through the vagina, which alchemical texts refer to as the shengsi qiao (生死竅; "orifice of life and death"). Chen Niwan 陳泥丸 (fl. twelfth century) describes egressing his spirit through the fontanel: "I have put into practice the work of old for a full year, and the six vessels have already stopped, the breath has returned to its root, and in the [lower] Cinnabar Field there is an infant (ying'er). Its body and appearance are similar to mine." Then comes the climax of the entire process: "As this infant grows, [there comes a point when it] cannot reside in this cavity [of the lower Cinnabar Field] any longer; so a fissure and then an orifice naturally appear, and it emerges through the top of the head. This is known as 'exiting and leaving the sea of sufferings.'"

After various embryonic transformations, practitioners of Internal Alchemy are supposedly reborn as perfected, luminous replicas of themselves. Men and women both refine their bodies into Pure Yang, eliminating all Yin to the extent that they no longer even have a shadow (or yinying (陰影)). That which they generate within themselves is not strictly the ethereal body of a transcendent because it is also visible to others. Subsequent Song (960–1279) and Yuan (1271–1368) inner alchemists, such as Xue Daoguang 薛道光 (1078?–1191) and Chen Zhixu 陳致虛 (b. 1290), both praised Chan Buddhism but explicitly criticized the widespread notion that jian xing chengfo ("seeing one's own buddha-nature") alone is sufficient to turn one into a buddha.

Neidan texts of the Ming period (1368–1644) frequently compare the development of the embryo to the revelation of Buddhahood. For instance, the 1615 Xingming guizhi (Principles of Balanced Cultivation of Inner Nature and Vital Force, the source of several illustrations above) uses fashen (法身; "Body of the Law; dharmakāya") as a synonym for shengtai. The birth of the embryo represents the appearance of the yuanshen (元神; "original spirit") or Buddhahood and is understood as enlightenment. The process leading to the birth of the embryo consists of the purification of xing ("inner nature") and ming ("vital force"). Thus, the true inner nature and vital force come into being, which in turn is equated to the return to emptiness. The embryo also indicates the unity of body shen (身; "body"), xin (心; "heart"), and yi (意; "intention") in a state of quiescence without motion.

Lastly, the embryo is related to the Inner Alchemy practice of Taixi (embryonic breathing) (胎息), which denotes breathing like a child in the womb. Daoists have developed various methods of embryonic breathing but most of them share the fundamental idea that breath nourishes the body by circulating through its vital centers. To "breathe like an embryo" refers to a manner of respiration that does not involve the nose or the mouth but rather the pores of the skin. This expression may also denote the sensations experienced by adepts of something expanding and contracting, or "breathing" somewhere inside their bodies.

The Chinese Buddhist concept of the shengtai "embryo of sagehood" originated in medieval China as a trope describing the complex bodhisattva path invented in the apocryphal Humane King Sutra. This doctrine was differentiated from the better known and linguistically similar Indian Buddhist tathāgatagarbha ("embryo of the Buddha") concept that came to be equated with buddha-nature in China. The embryo of sagehood implies the "need not only to see one's inherent buddha-nature but also to nurture a buddhahood that has to be conceived, gestated, and birthed." In Chan Buddhism, nurturing the embryo of sagehood became a metaphor for a liminal period of idealized mountain and forest reclusion undertaken by enlightened masters who were still awaiting appointment to an abbacy. Daoist inner alchemists combined early Shangqing School sacred embryology with contemporaneous Chinese Buddhist conceptions about the sacred embryo, resulting in a belief that a practitioner could conceive, gestate, and give birth to a supernatural body.

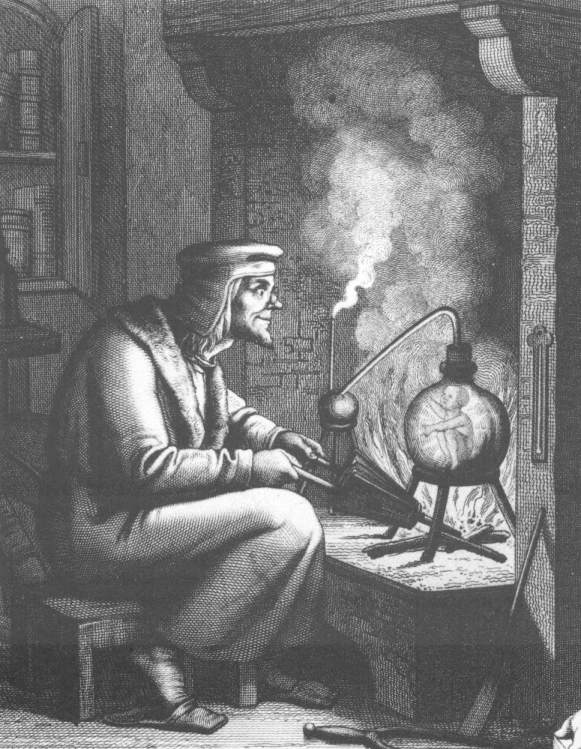
Homunculus from Goethe's Faust, Part Two

== See also ==
- Doppelgänger
- Homunculus
- Tulpa
