= Jiagou =

Jiagou may refer to these towns in Anhui, China:

- Jiagou, Huainan
- Jiagou, Suzhou, Anhui
