= Jiaoran =

Chinese poet and Buddhist monk (730-799)

- 皎然

Personal life
- Born: 730 Wuxing District, Huzhou, Zhejiang, China
- Died: 799 (aged 68–69) Unknown
- Notable work: Shishi
- Other name: Qingzhou

Religious life
- Religion: Chinese Buddhism
- Temple: Miaoxi Temple
- School: Chan Buddhism
- Dharma names: Jiaoran

Jiaoran (Chinese: 皎然; pinyin: Jiǎorán; Wade–Giles: Chiao-jan; 730–799), also known by his courtesy name Qingzhou (Chinese: 清昼), was a Tang dynasty Chinese poet and Buddhist monk. Jiaoran wrote more than 470 poems and was one of the three major Tang dynasty poet-monks (诗僧), along with Guanxiu (832–912) and Qiji (863–937). He was the 12th generation grandson of Xie An (320–385), a Jin dynasty (266–420) statesman who, despite his lack of military ability, led Jin through a major crisis—attacks by Former Qin (351–394). His friend, Lu Yu, is venerated as the Sage of Tea for his contribution to Chinese tea culture and the writer of The Classic of Tea.

== Biography ==
Jiaoran was born in 730 in Wuxing District of Huzhou city, Zhejiang province. During the An Lushan Rebellion (755–763), he dwelt in seclusion and studied Taoism. When he was about forty, the Yuan-Chao Rebellion broken broke out. He received ordination as a monk in Tianzhou Temple (天竺寺) in Hangzhou, in 767, the second year of the Dali period (766–779) of the Tang dynasty (618–907). He studied Risshū school at first and then converted to Chan Buddhism. He was the abbot of Miaoxi Temple (妙喜寺).

== Works ==
- Shishi (诗式)
