= AC block =

- Other names: AC block container Alternating current block
- Type: Energy storage device
- Industry: Energy storage
- Inception: 2022
- Definition: Integration of battery racks and string PCS into one container

An AC block, whose full name is alternating current block, also known as AC block container, is a container that integrates power conversion systems (PCSs) with batteries. First introduced in 2022, these devices are mainly used in grid-scale energy storage. AC blocks are mainly composed of PCSs, batteries, thermal management and other components, as well as cabling. It is seen as an alternative to the DC block container.

Currently, the number of companies that manufacture AC blocks is limited. The main manufacturers of such products include Sungrow, NV Energy, Fluence, and Wärtsilä. Although this product type was not introduced until 2022, this emerging product design is gaining increasing popularity in the battery energy storage industry.

== Compared to DC block containers ==
Compared to DC block containers, AC block containers reduce space requirements, provide better reliability, and easier installation. However, in the short term, AC ones will come at a cost premium. In the long run, the advantages of AC block products may drive down the overall system costs.

== History ==
The first AC block product was launched in 2022. In October 2023, another product in the same category was made available by Sungrow. In 2024, Wärtsilä released an AC block BESS called Quantum 3.

In early 2025, Sungrow introduced the "AC block based on triple-E integration" concept, where "triple-E" refers to power electronics, electrochemistry, and electrical grids. In June, the company rolled out the PowerTitan 3.0, which was built upon this specific concept.

== Manufacturers ==
According to a research report published by S&P Global Commodity Insights, as of November 2023, the manufacturers that produce AC blocks were very limited. Sungrow Power Supply and Rimac Energy were included in this report.
