= Pregadio =

Pregadio (pronounced [ˌprɛɡa(d)ˈdiːo]) is an Italian surname from Sicily, literally meaning '(s)he who prays God'. Notable people with the surname include:

- Fabrizio Pregadio (born 1957), Italian Sinologist and translator
- Roberto Pregadio (1928–2010), Italian composer, conductor and television personality
