= Panji Town =

Panji 潘集镇
- Town
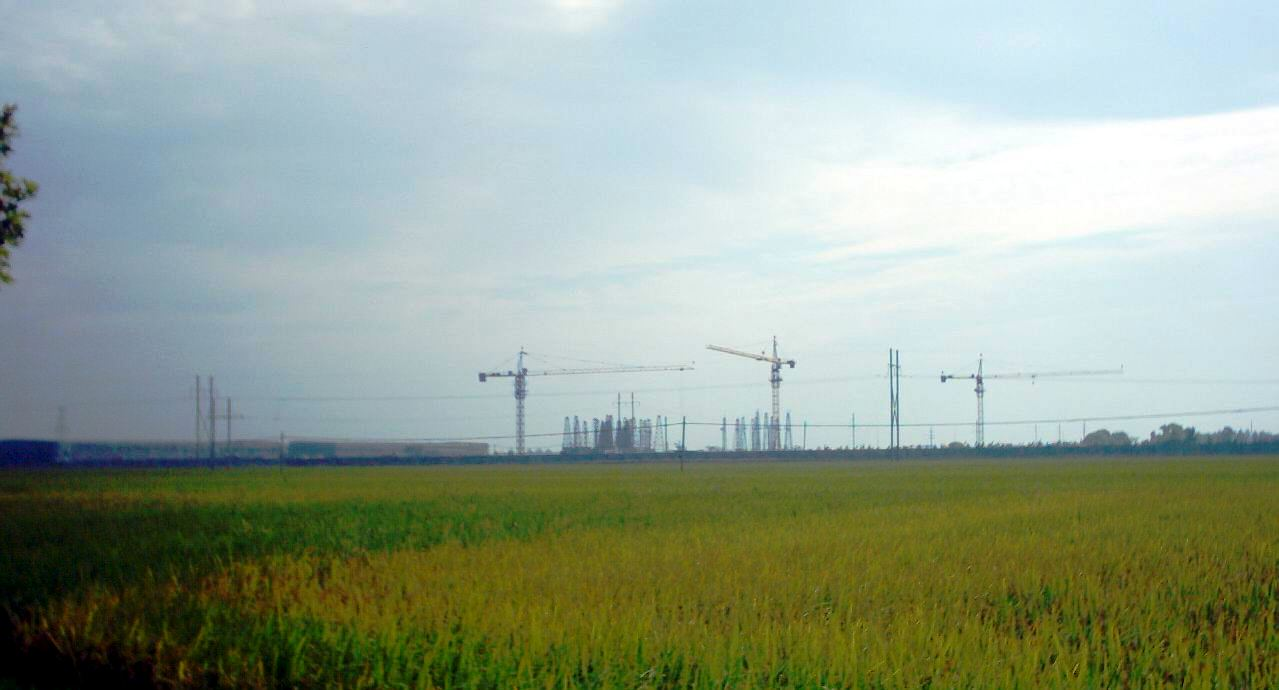
- Panbei Coal Mine in Panji Town

- Location in China
- Coordinates: 32°50′16″N 116°47′18″E
- Country: People's Republic of China
- Province: Anhui
- Prefecture-level city: Huainan
- District: Panji District
- Time zone: UTC+8 (China Standard)

Panji (Chinese: 潘集镇) is a town in Panji District, Huainan, Anhui. As of 2020, it administers the following seventeen villages:

- Panji Village
- Lixing Village (李兴村)
- Donghu Village (东湖村)
- Zhuzhuang Village (朱庄村)
- Huzhuang Village (胡庄村)
- Zhaoqian Village (赵前村)
- Zhaohou Village (赵后村)
- Xiawei Village (夏圩村)
- Dazhuang Village (大庄村)
- Wangwei Village (王圩村)
- Panyang Village (潘杨村)
- Jinan Village (集南村)
- Wuxiang Village (吴乡村)
- Zhangwei Village (张圩村)
- Weiwei Village (魏圩村)
- Xiaowei Village (小圩村)
- Caomiao Village (草庙村)
