= Pingxu =

Town in Anhui, China

Pingxu 平圩镇
- Town
- Interactive map of Pingxu
- Coordinates: 32°41′08″N 116°54′56″E
- Country: People's Republic of China
- Province: Anhui
- Prefecture-level city: Huainan
- District: Panji
- Time zone: UTC+8 (China Standard)

Pingxu (Chinese: 平圩镇) is a town in Panji District, Huainan, Anhui.
