= Sungrow Huainan Solar Farm =

Photovoltaic power station in Anhui, China

- Country: China
- Location: Liulong Village, 5 km from Nihe Town, Panji District, Huainan, Anhui, China
- Coordinates: 32°47′21″N 116°51′13″E
- Owner: Sungrow Power Supply

Solar farm
- Type: Flat-panel PV

Power generation
- Nameplate capacity: 40 MW

The Sungrow Huainan Solar Farm was once the world's largest floating solar array. Located 5 km southwest of Nihe Town, Huainan city in China's Anhui province, the array floats on an artificial lake, created on the site of a former coal mine, and has a capacity of 40 MW.

The array consists of 166,000 panels and was built by Sungrow Power Supply. It produces enough energy to power 15,000 homes, or twice as much as the previous holder of the largest-floating-solar-plant title, which was built by Xinyi Solar nearby in 2016.

The benefits of floating solar arrays include: lower temperatures boosting power efficiency; the lack of dust meaning it can stay clean longer; using the water to clean the panels; and reducing water evaporation.
