= Jiahe, Anhui =

Town in Anhui, China

Jiahe 架河镇
- Town
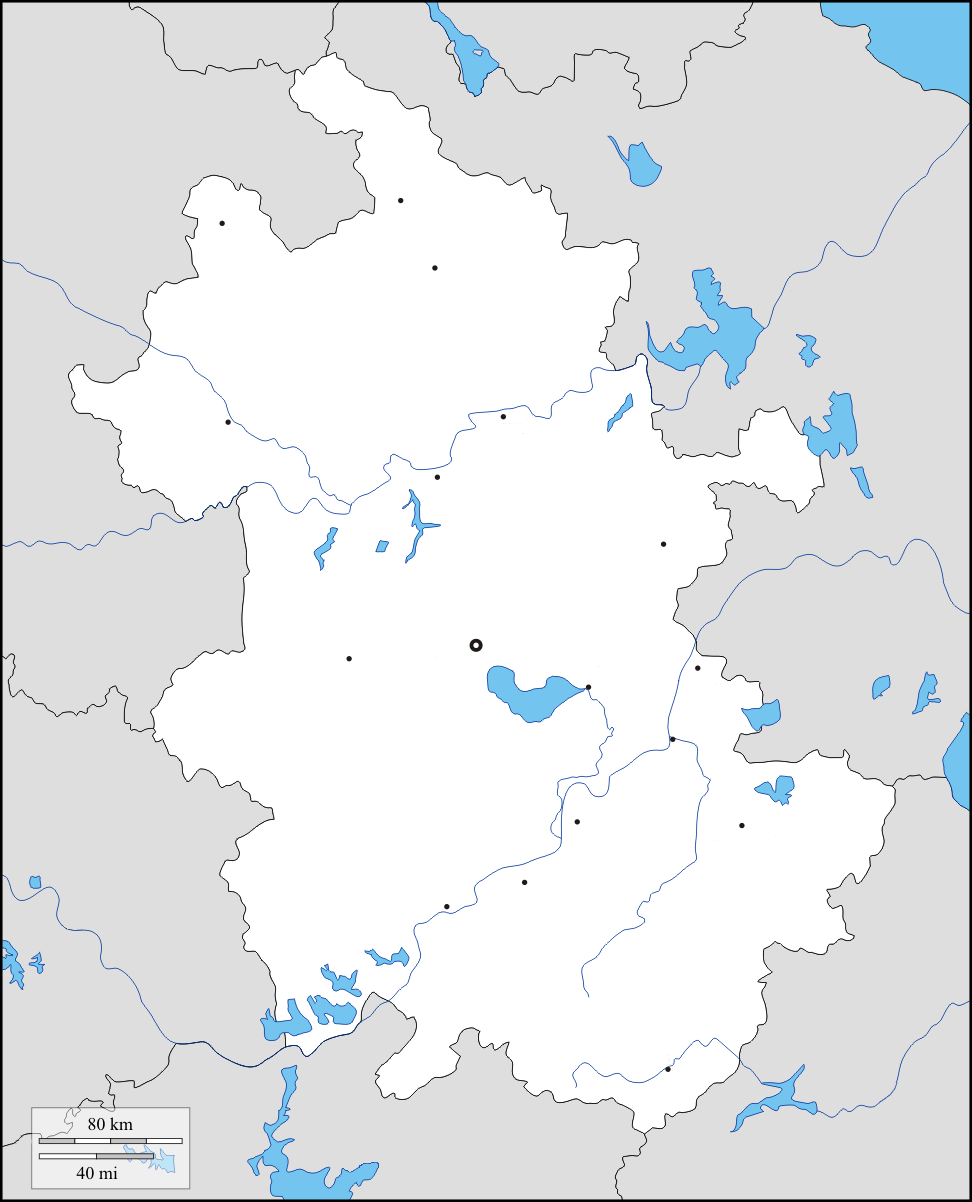
- Location in Anhui
- Coordinates: 32°45′9″N 116°45′46″E
- Country: People's Republic of China
- Province: Anhui
- Prefecture-level city: Huainan
- District: Panji District
- Time zone: UTC+8 (China Standard)

Jiahe (Chinese: 架河镇) is a town in Panji District, Huainan, Anhui.
