= Hetuan =

Hetuan 贺疃镇
- Town
- Location in China
- Coordinates: 32°52′51″N 116°43′59″E
- Country: People's Republic of China
- Province: Anhui
- Prefecture-level city: Huainan
- District: Panji District
- Time zone: UTC+8 (China Standard)

Hetuan (Chinese: 贺疃; pinyin: Hètuǎn) is a town in Panji District, Huainan, Anhui. As of 2020, it administers the following fourteen villages:

- Hetuan Village
- Qinwan Village (秦万村)
- Tangji Village (唐集村)
- Yangci Village (杨祠村)
- Shiwei Village (史圩村)
- Junliu Village (均刘村)
- Tangdong Village (塘东村)
- Tangxi Village (塘西村)
- Gulugang Village (古路岗村)
- Chenni Village (陈倪村)
- Lizhuang Village (李庄村)
- Jiazhuang Village (贾庄村)
- Yangyuan Village (杨元村)
- Zhuji Village (朱集村)
