= Luji, Anhui =

Town in Anhui, China

Luji 芦集镇
- Town
- Interactive map of Luji
- Coordinates: 32°48′08″N 116°42′53″E
- Country: People's Republic of China
- Province: Anhui
- Prefecture-level city: Huainan
- District: Panji
- Time zone: UTC+8 (China Standard)

Luji (Chinese: 芦集镇) is a town in Panji District, Huainan, Anhui.
