= Tianji Subdistrict =

Tianji Subdistrict 田集街道
- Subdistrict
- Location in China
- Coordinates: 32°46′46″N 116°48′57″E
- Country: People's Republic of China
- Province: Anhui
- Prefecture-level city: Huainan
- District: Panji District
- Time zone: UTC+8 (China Standard)

Tianji Subdistrict (Chinese: 田集街道; pinyin: Tiánjí Jiēdào) is a subdistrict in Panji District, Huainan, Anhui. As of 2020, it administers the following 23 residential communities:

- Tianji Community
- Juyuan Community (菊苑社区)
- Heyuan Community (荷苑社区)
- Bihai Community (碧海社区)
- Kuangbei Community (矿北社区)
- Taoyuan Community (桃苑社区)
- Baiyun Community (白云社区)
- Liwei Community (李圩社区)
- Lufan Community (芦范社区)
- Panzhuang Community (潘庄社区)
- Qinzhuang Community (秦庄社区)
- Yangji Community (杨集社区)
- Zhuantang Community (转塘社区)
- Liulong Community (刘龙社区)
- Liumiao Community (刘庙社区)
- Yangwei Community (杨圩社区)
- Nanwei Community (南圩社区)
- Liuwei Community (刘圩社区)
- Wuhu Community (吴湖社区)
- Zhuwei Community (朱圩社区)
- Yangtian Community (杨田社区)
- Guayuan Community (瓜园社区)
- Lanyuan Community (兰苑社区)

== See also ==
- List of township-level divisions of Anhui
