= Gaohuang =

Gaohuang 高皇镇
- Town
- Location in China
- Coordinates: 32°43′1″N 116°59′7″E
- Country: People's Republic of China
- Province: Anhui
- Prefecture-level city: Huainan
- District: Panji District
- Time zone: UTC+8 (China Standard)

Gaohuang (Chinese: 高皇; pinyin: Gāohuáng) is a town in Panji District, Huainan, Anhui. As of 2020, it administers Qianwei Residential Community (前圩社区) and the following 24 villages:

- Gaohuang Village
- Shunhe Village (顺河村)
- Zhugang Village (朱岗村)
- Houji Village (后集村)
- Minzhu Village (民主村)
- Daji Village (大集村)
- Longwo Village (龙窝村)
- Sungang Village (孙岗村)
- Caoyin Village (曹尹村)
- Laowei Village (老圩村)
- Suju Village (苏咀村)
- Xiangdong Village (巷东村)
- Duangang Village (段岗村)
- Shengli Village (胜利村)
- Zhaogang Village (赵岗村)
- Waxi Village (洼西村)
- Huaishang Village (淮上村)
- Antai Village (安台村)
- Duanwan Village (段湾村)
- Guangming Village (光明村)
- Zhakou Village (闸口村)
- Zhanggang Village (张岗村)
- Huji Village (胡集村)
- Laohu Village (老胡村)
