= Sungrow =

Chinese solar photovoltaic company

Sungrow Power Supply Co., Ltd.
- Trade name: Sungrow
- Native name: 阳光电源股份有限公司
- Company type: Public
- Traded as: SZSE: 300274; CSI A100
- Industry: Photovoltaics
- Founded: 1997; 29 years ago
- Founders: Cao Renxian
- Headquarters: Hefei, Anhui, China
- Key people: Cao Renxian (Chairman and President)
- Revenue: ▲CN¥72.25 billion (2023)
- Net income: ▲CN¥9.61 billion (2023)
- Total assets: ▲CN¥51.27 billion (2023)
- Total equity: ▲CN¥26.31 billion (2023)
- Number of employees: 13,697 (2023)
- Website: sungrowpower.com

Sungrow (also known as Sungrow Power Supply; Chinese: 阳光电源; pinyin: Yángguāng Diànyuán) is a publicly listed Chinese solar photovoltaic (PV) inverter manufacturing company headquartered in Hefei, Anhui, China.

== Background ==
Cao Renxian was a teacher at Hefei University of Technology. Dissatisfied with his job, in 1997 at the age of 30 Cao resigned from his position to start his own business in renewable energy despite his peers dissuading him as he had only just gotten married. Cao saved 80,000 yuan and obtained 500,00 yuan from friends and relative to start the business.

== History ==
When the business first started, renewable energy was only in its infancy stage and therefore Sungrow could only make traditional established products rather than developing ones. It encountered obstacles due to the weather. The turning point came in 2002 when the Chinese government started a solar energy project to brings electricity to remote villages in Northwestern China. Sungrow participated in the project which allowed it to rapidly develop.

Due to the 2008 financial crisis, photovoltaic power stations had financing difficulties and support in European countries suddenly stopped leading to a decline in industry demand. In 2011, China's photovoltaic production had excess capacity leading to drop in prices for materials and components. However Sungrow went against the trend wheres its profit increased tenfold between 2008 and 2011.

In November 2011, Sungrow held its initial public offering and became a listed company on the Shenzhen Stock Exchange.

Sungrow has played a significant role in Targeted Poverty Alleviation via photovoltaics. In April 2016, General Secretary Xi Jinping visited Anhui province and affirmed Sungrow's contribution to the project.

In 2017, Sungrow built the Sungrow Huainan Solar Farm which at the time was the largest floating solar farm in the world. It produced enough energy to power 15,000 homes which was double capacity of the solar farm (built by Xinyi Solar) previously considered the world's biggest.

In August 2018, Sungrow opened a factory in Bangalore, India. This would be its largest solar inverter manufacturing base built overseas.

In July 2023, The Australian reported concerns on how Sungrow which had links to the Chinese Government was one of the largest suppliers in the Australian solar inverter market.

In March 2024, Sungrow surpassed its rival LONGi Green Energy Technology as the world's most valuable solar sector company. Sungrow benefited from China's boom in battery-storage capacity leading to higher revenues, and in 2024, Sungrow had 14% world battery market share.

== See also ==
- LONGi Green Energy Technology
- Xinyi Solar
- Solar power in China
