= Gugou Hui Ethnic Township =

Ethnic township in Panji District, Huainan, Anhui

Gugou Hui Ethnic Township (Chinese: 古沟回族乡) is an ethnic township in Panji District, Huainan, Anhui.
