= Qiji (monk) =

- 齊己

Personal life
- Born: Hu Desheng (胡德生); 863 Weishan Township, Ningxiang, Hunan, China
- Died: 937 (aged 73–74) Jiangling County, Jingzhou, Hubei, China
- Other name: Hengyue Shamen (衡岳沙门)
- Occupation: Buddhist monk, poet

Religious life
- Religion: Chan Buddhism
- Temple: Longxing Temple
- School: Guiyang school
- Dharma names: Qiji

Senior posting
- Teacher: Yangshan Huiji

Qiji (simplified Chinese: 齐己; traditional Chinese: 齊己; pinyin: Qíjǐ; 863 - 937), also known by his art name Hengyue Shamen (衡岳沙门; 'Buddhist monk in Mount Hengshan'), was a Tang dynasty Chinese Buddhist monk and poet. Qiji wrote more than 852 poems, after Li Bai (701-762), Du Fu (712-770), Bai Juyi (772-846), Yuan Zhen (779-831), he ranks at the fifth position in terms of numbers of poems within the Tang poets. He was one of the big three of Tang dynasty poetmonks (诗僧), along with Guanxiu (832-912) and Jiaoran (730-799).

== Biography ==
Qiji was born Hu Desheng (胡德生) in 863, in Zuta Village, Weishan Township, Ningxiang, Hunan, to a family of tenant farmers. At the age of 6, he learned writing while grazed cattle for the Tongdu Temple (同度寺) on the mountain. He took refuge in the Three Jewels (became a monk) under Yangshan Huiji (807-883). As Adult, he went out to study and travelled to Yueyang, Changan, Zhongnan Mountains, Mount Huashan, and Jiangxi. When he returned to Changsha, Xu Dongye (徐东野), a poet in the office of Hunan military governor, said: "The poems we write are not good enough. We can't compare the poems you write." (我辈所作，皆拘于一途，非所谓通方之士。若齐己，才高思远，无所不通，殆难及矣。)

In 921, Qiji went to Sichuan via Jingzhou, Gao Jixing (858-929), formally Prince Wuxin of Chu, urged Qiji to stay at Longxing Temple (龙兴寺) and appointed him as abbot. He died at the age of 76 in Jiangling County, Jingzhou, Hubei.

== Works ==
- Fengsao Zhiyao (风骚旨格)
- Bailian Ji (白莲集)
