= Jiagou, Huainan =

Jiagou 夹沟镇
- Town
- Location in China
- Coordinates: 32°45′50″N 116°56′39″E
- Country: People's Republic of China
- Province: Anhui
- Prefecture-level city: Huainan
- District: Panji District
- Time zone: UTC+8 (China Standard)

Jiagou (simplified Chinese: 夹沟; traditional Chinese: 夾溝; pinyin: Jiágōu) is a town in Panji District, Huainan, Anhui. As of 2020, it administers the following 15 villages:

- Jiagou Village
- Wangju Village (王咀村)
- Chenji Village (陈集村)
- Zhuantang Village (转塘村)
- Caiying Village (蔡郢村)
- Liuji Village (刘集村)
- Dongwang Village (东王村)
- Gelong Village (鸽笼村)
- Laomiao Village (老庙村)
- Huali Village (华李村)
- Miaoqian Village (庙前村)
- Linchang Village (林场村)
- Beiwu Village (北武村)
- Xinji Village (新集村)
- Xueji Village (薛集村)
