= Fabrizio Pregadio =

Fabrizio Pregadio (born January 14, 1957) is an Italian Sinologist and a translator of Chinese language texts related to Taoism and Neidan (internal alchemy) into English. He is currently affiliated with the International Consortium for Research in the Humanities (University of Erlangen-Nuremberg), and is working on a project on the Taoist master Liu Yiming (1734–1821), initially supported by the German Research Foundation (DFG).

Earlier, Pregadio taught at the University of Venice (1996–97), Technische Universität Berlin (1998–2001), Stanford University (2001–08), McGill University in Montreal (2009–10), and the University of Erlangen-Nuremberg (2014–18).

His research interests are the Taoist views of the human being; the self-cultivation traditions of Taoism; their foundations in early Taoist works; and their relation to Chinese traditional sciences, including cosmology, alchemy, and medicine.

Pregadio is the author of Great Clarity: Daoism and Alchemy in Early Medieval China (Stanford University Press, 2006) and the editor of The Encyclopedia of Taoism (Routledge, 2008). His translations of Taoist texts include the Wuzhen pian (Awakening to Reality, 2009), the Cantong qi (The Seal of the Unity of the Three, 2011 and 2012), the Ruyao jing (Mirror for Compounding the Medicine, 2013), a work by the Taoist master Liu Yiming (Cultivating the Tao, 2013), and an anthology of texts on Neidan (2019), all published by Golden Elixir Press.

His most recent works include a dictionary of Taoist Internal Alchemy (2024) and an introduction to Taoist thought and religion (2025).
