= Thomas Cleary =

American author and translator (1949–2021)

Thomas F. Cleary
- Born: April 24, 1949; New Brunswick, New Jersey, U.S.
- Died: June 20, 2021 (aged 72)
- Education: Harvard University (Ph.D.); UC Berkeley School of Law (J.D.)
- Occupations: Translator, author
- Relatives: Jonathan C. Cleary (brother)
- Writing career
- Language: English
- Period: 1977–2021
- Subject: Eastern philosophy

Thomas Francis Cleary (24 April 1949 – 20 June 2021) was an American translator and author of more than 80 books related to Buddhist, Taoist, Confucian, and Muslim classics, and of The Art of War, a treatise on management, military strategy, and statecraft. He has translated books from Pali, Sanskrit, Arabic, Chinese, Japanese, and Old Irish into English. Cleary lived in Oakland, California.

== Early life ==
Cleary became interested in Buddhism when he was a teenager; his researches into Buddhist thought began with a desire to learn during this time of his life. When he began translating, he chose either untranslated works or—as in the case of Sun Tzu's The Art of War—books whose extant translations were "too limited". Cleary earned a Ph.D. in East Asian Languages and Civilizations from Harvard University, and a JD from the Boalt Hall School of Law at the University of California, Berkeley. After completing his doctoral studies, Cleary had little involvement with the academic world. "There is too much oppression in a university setting", he said. "I want to stay independent and reach those who want to learn directly through my books." Cleary's brother, Jonathan Christopher Cleary (1947–2023; frequently cited as J. C. Cleary), also completed his doctoral work in EALC at Harvard.

== Work ==
Thomas and Jonathon Cleary worked together to translate the koan collection The Blue Cliff Record; Shambhala published the translation in 1977. Thomas Cleary's most widely disseminated translation has been of Sun Tzu's The Art of War (Sunzi Bingfa). He also translated, beginning in 1984, the monumental Avatamsaka Sutra (also called Huayan Jing, or the Flower Ornament Scripture). The one volume edition was published in 1993. Another major translation was of the commentaries of the 18th century Taoist sage Liu Yiming, who explains the metaphoric coding of the main Taoist texts dealing with the transformation of consciousness, and the fusion of the human mind with the mind of Tao.

In 2000, Cleary's various translations of Taoist texts were collected into four volumes by Shambhala Publications as The Taoist Classics. Following the success of these publications, a five-volume collection of Buddhist translations was collected as Classics of Buddhism and Zen. Another translation from the Muslim wisdom tradition is Living and Dying with Grace. In 1993 Cleary published a translation of Miyamoto Musashi's Book of Five Rings.

== Personal life ==
Cleary died on 20 June 2021 in Oakland, California, due to complications from previous illnesses. He is survived by his wife and brothers.

== Bibliography ==
The following is a partial list of works translated by Thomas Cleary.

=== Taoism ===
- Understanding Reality: A Taoist Alchemical Classic, University of Hawaii Press, 1987. ISBN 0-8248-1139-9.
- The Essential Tao: An Initiation into the Heart of Taoism Through the Authentic Tao Te Ching and the Inner Teachings of Chuang-Tzu, HarperOne, 1993. ISBN 978-0-06-250216-2.
- The Secret of the Golden Flower: The Classic Chinese Book of Life, HarperOne, 1993. ISBN 0-06-250193-3.
- Sex, Health, and Long Life: Manuals of Taoist Practice, Shamphala, 1995. ISBN 978-1-57062-059-1.
- Immortal Sisters: Secret Teachings of Taoist Women, North Atlantic Books, 1996. ISBN 1-55643-222-4.
- Taoist Meditation: Methods for Cultivating a Healthy Mind and Body, Shambhala, 2000. ISBN 1-57062-567-0.
- Classics of Strategy and Counsel, Volume 2: The Collected Translations of Thomas Cleary, Shambhala, 2001. ISBN 978-1-57062-728-6.
- Alchemists, Mediums, and Magicians: Stories of Taoist Mystics, Shambhala, 2001. ISBN 978-1-59030-659-8.
- The Book of Balance and Harmony: A Taoist Handbook, Shambhala, 2003. ISBN 978-1-59030-077-0.
- The Taoist Classics, Volume One: The Collected Translations of Thomas Cleary, Shambhala, 2003. ISBN 978-1-57062-905-1.
- The Taoist Classics, Volume Two: The Collected Translations of Thomas Cleary, Shambhala, 2003. ISBN 1-57062-906-4.
- The Taoist Classics, Volume Three: The Collected Translations of Thomas Cleary, Shambhala, 2003. ISBN 1-57062-907-2.
- The Taoist Classics, Volume Four: The Collected Translations of Thomas Cleary, Shambhala, 2003. ISBN 1-57062-908-0.
- The Taoist I Ching, Shambhala, 2005. ISBN 1-59030-260-5.
- The Tao Deck, New I-Ching Tool, Lotus Press, 2005. ISBN 978-0-9707159-0-6.
- Awakening to the Tao, Shambhala, 2006. ISBN 1-59030-344-X.
- The Way of the World: Readings in Chinese Philosophy, Shambhala, 2009. ISBN 978-1-59030-738-0.
- Chuang-tzu: The Outer Chapters, 2011. ASIN B005PGNO5W.
- The Taoism Reader, Shambhala, 2012. ISBN 978-1-59030-950-6.
- Lost Legends of Immortals, 2012. ASIN B0074B26NC.

=== Buddhism ===
- The Flower Ornament Scripture: A Translation of the Avatamsaka Sutra, Shambhala, 1993. ISBN 0-87773-940-4.
- Instant Zen: Waking up in the Present, North Atlantic Books, 1994. ISBN 1-55643-193-7.
- Buddhist Yoga: A Comprehensive Course, Shambhala, 1995. ISBN 1-57062-018-0.
- Classics of Buddhism and Zen, Volume One: The Collected Translations of Thomas Cleary, Shambhala, 2001. ISBN 978-1-59030-218-7.
- Classics of Buddhism and Zen, Volume Two: The Collected Translations of Thomas Cleary, Shambhala, 2001. ISBN 978-1-59030-219-4.
- Classics of Buddhism and Zen, Volume Three: The Collected Translations of Thomas Cleary, Shambhala, 2001. ISBN 978-1-59030-220-0.
- Classics of Buddhism and Zen, Volume Four: The Collected Translations of Thomas Cleary, Shambhala, 2001. ISBN 978-1-59030-221-7.
- Classics of Buddhism and Zen, Volume Five: The Collected Translations of Thomas Cleary, Shambhala, 2002. ISBN 978-1-59030-222-4.
- The Buddha Scroll, Shambhala, 2002. ISBN 978-1-57062-513-8.
- Transmission of Light: Zen in the Art of Enlightenment by Zen Master Keizan, Shambhala, 2002. ISBN 1-57062-949-8.
- Book of Serenity: One Hundred Zen Dialogues, Shambhala, 2005. ISBN 1-59030-249-4.
- Body, Mind, and Breath: a Meditation Handbook, 2011. ASIN B005L95UKA.
- Tao Te Ching: Zen Teachings on the Taoist Classic, Shambhala, 2011. ISBN 978-0-8348-2737-0.
- The First Book of Zen, 2012. ASIN B009NNAD8E.
- The Lankavatara Sutra, 2012. ASIN B00AJXMYCA.
- Sitting Meditation, 2012. ASIN B007VHAS7A.
- Zen in the Pure Land, 2012. ASIN B009GA6ZGI.
- The Zen Reader, Shambhala, 2012. ISBN 978-1-59030-946-9.
- Introduction to Chan Buddhism, 2014. ASIN B00JAPPNFS.
- Chan Buddhist Meditation, 2015. ASIN B015JWHZR4.
- The Fifth Council: Buddhism for the Sciences, 2015. ASIN B00VZB2UYM.
- The Secrets of Tantric Buddhism: Understanding the Ecstasy of Enlightenment, Weiser Books, 2015. ISBN 978-1-57863-568-9.

=== Islam ===
- The Essential Koran: The Heart of Islam, Harper San Francisco, 1994. ISBN 978-0-06-250198-1.
- The Qur'an: A New Translation by Thomas Cleary, Starlatch Press, 2004. ISBN 978-1-929694-44-0.

=== Other ===
- The Book of Five Rings: A Classic Text on the Japanese Way of the Sword, Shambhala, 2005. ISBN 978-1-59030-248-4.
- The Counsels of Cormac: An Ancient Irish Guide to Leadership, Doubleday, 2004. ISBN 0-385-51313-5.
- Training the Samurai Mind: A Bushido Sourcebook, Shambhala, 2008. ISBN 978-1-59030-572-0.
- Samurai Wisdom: Lessons from Japan's Warrior Culture - Five Classic Texts on Bushido, Tuttle Publishing, 2014. ISBN 978-4-8053-1293-3.
- Six Secrets: A classic Chinese manual of Strategy, 2014, ASIN B00IOZ2BU0.
- Soul of the Samurai: Modern Translations of Three Classic Works of Zen & Bushido, Tuttle Publishing, 2014. ISBN 978-4-8053-1291-9.
- Judgments of the Irish, 2015. ASIN B012BTPBJC.
