= Qiji, Anhui =

Qiji 祁集镇
- Town
- Location in China
- Coordinates: 32°41′44″N 116°51′43″E
- Country: People's Republic of China
- Province: Anhui
- Prefecture-level city: Huainan
- District: Panji District
- Time zone: UTC+8 (China Standard)

Qiji (Chinese: 祁集; pinyin: Qíjí) is a town in Panji District, Huainan, Anhui. As of 2020, it administers the following three residential communities and five villages:

- Qiji Community
- Qiwei Community (祁圩社区)
- Caogang Community (曹岗社区)
- Chenhu Village (陈湖村)
- Chenying Village (陈郢村)
- Quanqiao Village (劝桥村)
- Huanggang Village (黄岗村)
- Xugang Village (许岗村)
