= Liu Yiming =

Chinese Taoist master (1734–1821)

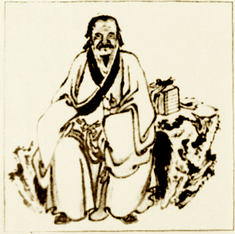
- Portrait by Qing-dynasty painter Tang Lian, ca. 1800/1820
- Born: 1734
- Died: 1821
- Religion: Taoism
- Lineage: Longmen

Liu Yiming
- Traditional Chinese: 劉一明
- Simplified Chinese: 刘一明
Transcriptions
Standard Mandarin
- Hanyu Pinyin: Liú Yīmíng
- Wade–Giles: Liu I-ming

Liu Yiming (1734–1821) (刘一明) was a Chinese Taoist master, thinker, and writer. He was one of the main representatives of Taoist Internal Alchemy, or Neidan. He was an 11th-generation master of one of the northern branches of the Longmen 龍門 (Dragon Gate) lineage, and the author of a large number of works that illustrate his views on both Taoism and Neidan.

== Life ==
Liu Yiming (刘一明) was born in 1734 in Quwo (曲沃), Pingyang 平陽 (in present-day Linfen, Shanxi). Before he reached the age of 20, he was severely ill three times (Sun Yongle 2011:302). After recovery, he began to travel, and in 1755 he met his first master, whom he calls the Kangu Laoren 龕谷老人 (Elder of the Kangu Valley). Between 1756 and 1761, he lived in Beijing, and later moved to Henan where he worked as a doctor (Sun Yongle 2011:302).

In 1766 he resumed traveling, and around 1768 he met the Xianliu zhangren 遇仙留丈 (Great Man Who Rests in Immortality), who became his main master. As Liu Yiming reports in one of his works, it was under the Xianliu zhangren that he obtained the full awakening (Liu Yiming 2013:34; Baldrian-Hussein 2008:691). After his awakening, the Xianliu zhangren gave Liu Yiming teachings on Neidan.

After the death of his father in 1769, Liu Yiming—who was then in his mid-30s—alternated periods of traveling (in Shaanxi, Gansu, Ningxia, and elsewhere) and of seclusion for a decade. In early 1779 (possibly, in late 1778), he visited Mount Qiyun 棲雲山 in Jincheng 金城 (present-day Yuzhong, Gansu) and settled there. From that time, this mountain became his stable residence, even though he occasionally traveled elsewhere. His abode, called Zizai wo 自在窩 (Nest of Being by Oneself), is still extant in the present day (Sun Yongle 2011:304; Baldrian-Hussein 2008:691).

Liu Yiming devoted the second half of his life to teaching and writing. Far from living as a solitary recluse (as is sometimes stated), he soon began to leave his mark on the mountain, raising funds from an extended network of benefactors (shanren 善人) in order to restore temples, shrines, and other buildings; to buy and lease fields to poor farmers; and to provide burial ground to those who could not afford it. In 1816, he prognosticated an auspicious place for his tomb on top of Mount Qiyun, and his "grave-cavern" was built there. In 1821, on the 6th day of the 1st lunar month, Liu Yiming entered the grave, pronounced his final words to his disciples, and died (Sun Yongle 2011:308).

== Works ==
The main collection of Liu Yiming's works is entitled Daoshu shi'er zhong 道書十二種 (Twelve Books on the Dao; Pregadio 2008:331-33). His best-known works—all found in this collection—consist of commentaries to Neidan texts and of independent works on Neidan, including the following:

=== Main commentaries to Neidan texts ===
- Cantong zhizhi 參同直指 (Straightforward Directions on the Unity of the Three), on the Zhouyi cantong qi (The Seal of the Unity of the Three)
- Wuzhen zhizhi 悟真直指 (Straightforward Directions on the Awakening to Reality), on the Wuzhen pian (Awakening to Reality); trans. Cleary 1987
- Yinfu jing zhu 陰符經注 (Commentary to the Scripture of the Hidden Agreement), on the Yinfu jing (Scripture of the Hidden Agreement); trans. Cleary 1991:220-38
- Jindan sibai zi jie 金丹四百字解 (Explication of the Four Hundred Words on the Golden Elixir), on the Jindan sibai zi (Four Hundred Words on the Golden Elixir), with additional poems by Liu Yiming; trans. Cleary 1986a:3-48

=== Main works on Neidan ===
- Xiangyan poyi 象言破疑 (Removing Doubts on Symbolic Language); trans. Cleary, 1986a:51-118
- Wudao lu 悟道錄 (Accounts of an Awakening to the Dao); trans. Cleary 1988
- Xiyou yuanzhi 西遊原旨 (The Original Purport of the Journey to the West), containing a Neidan interpretation of the Ming-dynasty novel Journey to the West

=== Other works ===
In addition, Liu Yiming wrote:

- Several books on the Yijing (Book of Changes); one of them, the Zhouyi chanzhen 周易闡真 (Uncovering the True in the Book of Changes), is translated in Cleary 1986b
- Little-known commentaries to the Daode jing and to Buddhist texts (Heart Sutra and Diamond Sutra)
- Works on ophthalmology and other medical subjects

== Views on Taoism and Internal Alchemy ==
This summary of Liu Yiming's views on Taoism and Internal Alchemy is mainly based on the Xiuzhen houbian (Further Discriminations in Cultivating Reality; English trans. in Liu Yiming 2013). The main Chinese works on Liu Yiming are Liu Ning 2001; Liu Zhongyu 2010; and Jia Laisheng 2011.

The "unity of the three teachings" (Taoism, Buddhism, Confucianism) is one of the major themes in Liu Yiming's teachings; accordingly, he uses Buddhist and Neo-Confucian terminology, to different extents according to the individual texts he wrote (Baldrian-Hussein 2008:691). This is a major aspect of Neidan (Internal Alchemy) itself, whose masters frequently draw concepts and terms from different traditions if this serves to express their point.

=== "Precelestial" and "Postcelestial" ===
The distinction between the "precelestial" (xiantian 先天) and the "postcelestial" (houtian 後天) domains (before and after the generation of the cosmos, respectively) is essential in Liu Yiming's discourse on Taoism and Internal Alchemy. The precelestial domain harbors Original Essence (yuanjing 元精), Original Breath (yuanqi 元氣), and Original Spirit (yuanshen 元神), which are all formless. Their operation results in the generation of the postcelestial domain (Liu Yiming 2013:23-25). In the human being, Original Essence manifests itself mainly as semen in males and menstrual blood in females; Original Breath manifests itself mainly as the ordinary breath of inspiration and expiration; and Original Spirit manifests itself mainly as the thinking mind (Liu Yiming 2013:27; see Three Treasures). The precelestial state is Yang, and the postcelestial state is Yin. The shift from one to the other state is seen as inevitable; however, the precelestial state is not erased, but only concealed within the postcelestial (Liu Yiming 2013:50, 124, 141).

Above the precelestial and postcelestial domains, Liu Yiming places the Precelestial Breath of True Unity (xiantian zhenyi zhi qi 先天真一之氣). This state is beyond definition or description: "It cannot be compared to the postcelestial breath of inspiration and expiration, the thinking spirit, and the essence of the intercourse; and it also cannot be equated to the Original Essence, the Original Breath, and the Original Spirit" (Liu Yiming 2013:32). In alchemical terms, according to Liu Yiming, the Precelestial Breath of True Unity is the Golden Elixir (id.). The Elixir, therefore, consists in the conjunction of the precelestial and the postcelestial, and grants access to the higher state of non-duality, or True Unity.

=== The Human Being ===
The Mysterious Barrier. The One Opening of the Mysterious Barrier (xuanguan yiqiao 玄關一竅) is the spaceless center of the human being. Liu Yiming agrees with earlier Neidan masters in saying that this center is neither in the body nor in the mind (Liu Yiming 2013:101-2). The One Opening harbors the Precelestial Breath of True Unity. With the shift from the precelestial to the postcelestial, the precelestial True Yang becomes concealed within the postcelestial Yin, and the recognition of the spaceless center is lost. In the images of the Yijing (Book of Changes), True Yang becomes the solid line (⚊) found within Kan ☵, surrounded by two broken Yin lines. The purpose of Neidan consists in recovering the Yang within Kan ☵ and in using it to replace the Yin within Li ☲. This allows Qian ☰ (True Yang) and Kun ☷ (True Yin) to be reconstituted and then newly joined to one another.

Nature and Existence. Nature (xing 性) and Existence (ming 命) are the two main poles of one's life, and the core of Neidan: "The Way of the Golden Elixir is the Way of cultivating Nature and Existence" (Xiuzhen biannan). "Nature" refers to one's authentic, inner Nature, which is innately perfected. "Existence" refers to one's life as an individual being, including one's function in existence as a whole. According to Liu Yiming, the shift from the precelestial to the postcelestial involves that both Nature and Existence take on two aspects, which he calls "true" and "false" (Liu Yiming 2013:44). One's true Nature can be hidden by one's false personality; and one's true Existence (or "true destiny") can be concealed by "following the course" (shun 順) of life. The gradual process of Neidan provides a means for "inverting the course" (ni 逆), making it possible first to "return to one's destiny," and then to "see one's Nature."

Body and Mind. In Liu Yiming's view, the ordinary body and mind are "illusory" (huan 幻). Their authentic counterparts are the "dharma-body" (fashen 法身) and the "celestial mind" (tianxin 天心). The celestial mind is "utterly empty and utterly numinous, silent and unmoving," and "pervades throughout by responding to impulses" (Liu Yiming 2013:40). The dharma-body (a term that in Buddhism means the awakened "body" of the Buddha; see Trikaya) has "no head and no tail, no front and no back; it stands at the center and does not slant" (id.). With the shift to the postcelestial domain, "the dharma-body is buried and the illusory body takes charge, the celestial mind retires from its position and the human mind takes power" (id.). Neidan makes it possible to attain "the utmost of quiescence," which is a property of the celestial mind. Moreover, the practice is concluded with the birth of the Embryo of Sainthood (shengtai 聖胎), which in Liu Yiming's view is equivalent to one's dharma-body, or "true body" (Liu Yiming 2013:62).

=== Neidan (Internal Alchemy) ===
"Superior Virtue" and "Inferior Virtue". Concerning Neidan, Liu Yiming makes a fundamental distinction between two ways of self-cultivation, respectively called "superior virtue" (shangde 上德) and "inferior virtue" (xiade 下德; Liu Yiming 2013:117-20). Superior virtue is the state in which the precelestial has not been damaged and the original state of Unity is unspoiled. The few persons who have an inherent potential to preserve this state only need to "protect it and guard it" (Liu Yiming 2013:117). This requires receiving the instructions of a master, but the method (fa 法) ultimately consists in following the Tao itself: there is no need to "do" a practice, and one operates by "non-doing" (wuwei 無為). If this original state is not preserved, the precelestial is dispersed and the postcelestial takes over. To recover the precelestial state, one cannot anymore operate by "non-doing" and instead must "do": one needs a technique (shu 術) through which one can conjoin the True Yang and True Yin now found within the postcelestial Yin and Yang, respectively. This is the way of Internal Alchemy, which is the way of inferior virtue. However, Liu Yiming points out that when the way of inferior virtue has been fulfilled, it leads "to the same destination as superior virtue" (Liu Yiming 2013:118).

"Doing" and "Non-Doing". In parallel to the distinction between superior and inferior virtue, Liu Yiming also establishes a key difference between two aspects, or stages, of the Internal Elixir. These stages focus on the cultivation of Nature and Existence, and they correspond to the ways of superior and inferior virtue, respectively. Those who are able to follow the way of superior virtue perform the two stages simultaneously: "In superior virtue, there is no need to cultivate Existence and one just cultivates Nature: when Nature is fulfilled, then Existence is also fulfilled" (Liu Yiming 2013:119). Everyone else should perform the two stages in sequence, starting from the lower one and then proceeding to the higher one: "In inferior virtue, one must first cultivate Existence and then cultivate Nature; after Existence is fulfilled, one must also fulfill Nature" (id.). The way of superior virtue attains both stages instantly by "non-doing." Inferior virtue, instead, is the gradual way, and its practice is performed first by "doing" and then by "non-doing."

The Two Elixirs. The stages mentioned above correspond to two different Elixirs, which Liu Yiming calls Small Reverted Elixir (xiao huandan 小還丹) and Great Reverted Elixir (da huandan 大還丹). The Small Reverted Elixir "consists in returning from the postcelestial to the precelestial" (Liu Yiming 2013:61). This is the movement of ascent, the "inversion of the course" performed through Internal Alchemy. The practice, however, is completed only by compounding the Great Reverted Elixir. At this stage, one performs the complementary movement of descent, returning "from Non-Being to Being, and from the subtle to the manifest" (Liu Yiming 2013:62). Thus Internal Alchemy, through its gradual process, enables one to ascend to the precelestial, but its practice is concluded when the descent to the postcelestial is also performed. Then the precelestial and the postcelestial become one, and one operates by transforming (hua 化) the postcelestial into the precelestial.

== Works quoted ==
- Baldrian-Hussein, Farzeen. 2008. "Liu Yiming." In Fabrizio Pregadio, ed., The Encyclopedia of Taoism, pp. 690–91. London: Routledge.
- Cleary, Thomas (trans.). 1986a. The Inner Teachings of Taoism. Boston and London: Shambhala.
- Cleary, Thomas (trans.). 1986b. The Taoist I Ching. Boston and London: Shambhala.
- Cleary, Thomas (trans.). 1987. Understanding Reality: A Taoist Alchemical Classic. Honolulu: University of Hawaii Press.
- Cleary, Thomas (trans.). 1988. Awakening to the Tao. Boston and Shaftesbury: Shambhala.
- Cleary, Thomas (trans.). 1991. Vitality, Energy, Spirit: A Taoist Sourcebook. Boston and London: Shambhala.
- Jia Laisheng 贾来生. 2011. Tiejian daoyi: Liu Yiming dazhuan 铁肩道义 — 刘一明大传 [Carrying the meaning of the Tao on one's iron shoulders: A biography of Liu Yiming]. Beijing: Zongjiao wenhua chubanshe.
- Liu Ning 刘宁. 2001. Liu Yiming xiudao sixiang yanjiu 刘一明修道思想研究 [A study of Liu Yiming's thought on Cultivating the Tao]. Chengdu: Ba Shu shushe.
- Liu Yiming (劉一明). 2013. Cultivating the Tao: Taoism and Internal Alchemy. The Xiuzhen houbian (c. 1798), translated with Introduction and Notes by Fabrizio Pregadio. Mountain View, CA: Golden Elixir Press. ISBN 978-0-985547516.
- Liu Zhongyu 劉仲宇. 2010. Liu Yiming xue'an 劉一明學案 [Materials for the study of Liu Yiming]. Jinan: Qi Lu shushe.
- Pregadio, Fabrizio. 2008. "Daoshu shier zhong (Twelve Books on the Dao)." In Fabrizio Pregadio, ed., The Encyclopedia of Taoism, pp. 331–33. London: Routledge.
- Pregadio, Fabrizio. 2019. Taoist Internal Alchemy: An Anthology of Neidan Texts. Mountain View, CA: Golden Elixir Press.
- Sun Yongle 孙永乐 (ed.). 2011. Liu Yiming: Qiyun biji 刘一明 — 栖云笔记 [Liu Yiming: Miscellaneous Notes from Mount Qiyun]. Beijing: Shehui kexue wenxian chubanshe.
