= Wuzhen pian =

Daoist classic

The Wuzhen pian (Chinese: 悟真篇; pinyin: Wùzhēn piān; Wade–Giles: Wu-chen p'ien; lit. 'Folios on Awakening to Reality/Perfection') is a 1075 Taoist classic on Neidan-style internal alchemy. Its author Zhang Boduan (張伯端; 987?–1082) was a Song dynasty scholar of the Three teachings (Confucianism, Taoism, and Buddhism).

== Title ==
Wuzhen pian combines three Chinese words.

- wu 悟 "realize; awaken; understand; perceive (esp. truth)", viz. Japanese satori
- zhen 真 "true, real, genuine; really, truly, clearly; (Daoist) true/authentic character of human beings"
- pian 篇 "piece of writing; strip of bamboo, sheet of paper; article, essay, chapter"

The Chinese character wu 悟 "awaken; realize", which is written with the "heart/mind radical" 忄and a phonetic of wu 吾 "I; my; we; our", has a literary variant Chinese character wu 寤 "awake; wake up" with the "roof radical" 宀, qiang 爿 "bed", and this wu 吾 phonetic. Compare the given name of Sun Wukong 孙悟空, the central character in Journey to the West, which literally means "Awaken to Emptiness".

The ambiguity of the Wuzhen pian title, and by extension the text itself, is illustrated by these English renderings:

- Essay on the Understanding of the Truth
- Folios on the Apprehension of Perfection
- Awakening to Perfection
- Understanding Reality
- Chapters on Awakening to the Real
- Chapters on Awakening to Perfection
- The Essay on Realizing the Truth
- Awakening to Reality

== Author ==
Zhang Boduan, or Zhang Ziyang (張紫陽), was a native of Tiantai in present-day Zhejiang. After passing the Imperial examination, he began a career as a civil servant, but was banished to the frontier in Lingnan, where he served as a military commissioner. Zhang was later transferred to Guilin and Chengdu, where in 1069 he allegedly experienced sudden realization from a Taoist master who instructed him in Neidan internal alchemy. Zhang wrote the Wuzhen pian, its appendices, and a few other texts, including the Jindan sibai zi (Chinese: 金丹四百字; lit. 'Four hundred words on the Golden Elixir'). He was additionally an authority on Chan Buddhism.

Biographical sources agree that Zhang Boduan died in 1082 CE during the reign of Emperor Shenzong of Song, but disagree whether he was born in 983, 984, or 987. Zhang was honorifically called Ziyang Zhenren (紫陽真人), ranking him as a Taoist zhenren, a title that shares the word zhen (real/true/authentic) with Wuzhen pian.

The Quanzhen School of Taoism originated in the 12th century with the Five Northern Patriarchs (Wang Chongyang and his successors). In the 13th century, Zhang Boduan posthumously became the second of the Five Southern Patriarchs in the so-called Nanzong (南宗; 'Southern Lineage'), which Boltz refers to as "ex post facto".

In Shaanxi, Hong Kong, and Singapore, there are Zhenren Gong (真人宮; 'Real/Perfected Person Temples') dedicated to Zhang Boduan.

== Texts ==
The received Wuzhen pian text contains a preface dated 1075 and a postface dated 1078, both under the name Zhang Boduan. The Daozang "Taoist Canon" includes several textual editions of varying lengths.

The core of the Wuzhen pian comprises 81 poems: 16 heptasyllabic lüshi, 64 heptasyllabic jueju quatrains, and one pentasyllabic verse on the Taiyi (太一; 'Great Unity'). Both 16 (= 2 x 8) and 64 (= 8 x 8) have numerological significance, the former denotes two equal "8 ounce" measures of Yin and Yang (alchemical allusions for mercury and lead) totaling "16 ounces" (one catty), and the latter correlates with the 64 I Ching hexagrams.

Zhang later appended the Wuzhen pian text with 12 alchemical ci (i.e., lyrics) that numerologically correspond to the 12 months, and 5 verses related with the wuxing.

Baldrian-Hussein describes the text:

The verses of the Wuzhen pian are a work of literary craftsmanship and were probably intended to be sung or chanted. They teem with paradoxes, metaphors, and aphorisms, and their recondite style allows multiple interpretations. The verses are widely accepted as an elaboration of the Zhouyi cantong qi, but their philosophical basis is in the Daode jing and the Yinfu jing. Life, says Zhang Boduan, is like a bubble on floating water or a spark from a flint, and the search for wealth and fame only results in bodily degeneration; thus human beings should search for the Golden Elixir (jindan 金丹) to become celestial immortals (tianxian 天仙).

The Wuzhen pian is one of the major scriptures of Taoist Neidan ("Inner Alchemy ") and metaphorically uses the vocabulary of Waidan ("External Alchemy"), which involved compounding elixirs from minerals and medicinal herbs. The text proposes that External Alchemy is unnecessary because the human body contains the essential components. These Three Treasures are jing, qi, and shen. Through alchemical refinement of bodily jing and qi, one can supposedly achieve integration with one's spiritual shen nature.

== Commentaries ==
The intentionally abstruse and highly symbolic language of the Wuzhen pian is open to diverse interpretations. Many commentators, both Taoist and otherwise, have explicated the text.

The Taoist Canon includes a dozen commentaries (zhu 主) and sub-commentaries (shu 疏) to the Wuzhen pian. Major commentaries are by Ye Shibiao (葉士表; dated 1161), Yuan Gongfu (遠公輔; dated 1202), and several (dated 1335 and 1337) by Weng Baoquang (翁葆光) and Dai Qizong (戴起宗).

In addition, there are numerous later commentaries to the text. Two notable examples are by Qiu Zhao'ao (仇兆鰲; dated 1713), who quotes from 25 commentaries, and by Liu Yiming (dated 1794), who was 11th patriarch of the Quanzhen Longmen "Dragon Gate" Lineage.

== Translations ==
The Wuzhen pian has full and partial translations into English. Tenney L. Davis and Chao Yün-ts’ung, who collaborated on several groundbreaking studies of Taoist alchemy, published the first English version in 1939. Paul Crowe wrote a detailed study of the Wuzhen pian text and a full annotated translation. Thomas Cleary translated the text and Liu Yiming's commentary.

Partial translations are given by Livia Kohn and Eva Wong. Fabrizio Pregadio translates the first 16 poems, with annotations on individual verses and selections from Liu Yiming's commentary.

Louis Komjathy uses Cleary's version to illustrate the importance of "linguistic competency" in translating Taoist texts. Komjathy describes the Wuzhen pian's content as "so highly symbolic that it is all but impenetrable without commentaries or oral instructions." For instance, the Chinese original of the third stanza is written in four paired heptasyllabic verses:

學仙須是學天仙、

惟有金丹最的端。
二物會時情性合、
五行全處龍虎蟠。
本因戊己為媒娉、
遂使夫妻鎮合歡。
只候功成朝北闕、

九霞光裏駕祥鸞。

The first translation is by Davis and Chao.

If you are learning to be a hsien (immortal), you should learn to be a heavenly hsien. The most accurate means (for this purpose) is chin tan (gold medicine). The two things, when put into contact with each other, will indicate harmonious properties. The Tiger and the Dragon locate at the places where the wu hsing 五行 (five elements) are perfected. I desire to send wu ssu 戊巳 as a matchmaker to make them husband and wife and to bring them into a union from which real happiness will arise. Wait for the success of the compounding, and you will return to see the north gate of the Imperial palace. You will be able to ride on a phoenix's back, to fly high into the cloud and the light of the sky.

Cleary idiosyncratically translates in capital letters to distinguish the text from his translation of Liu's commentary:

IF YOU ARE GOING TO STUDY IMMORTALITY, YOU SHOULD STUDY CELESTIAL IMMORTALITY; ONLY THE GOLD ELIXIR IS WORTHWHILE. WHEN THE TWO THINGS JOIN, SENSE AND ESSENCE MERGE; WHEN THE FIVE ELEMENTS ARE COMPLETE, THE TIGER AND DRAGON INTERTWINE. STARTING WITH HEAVEN-EARTH AND EARTH-EARTH AS GO-BETWEENS, FINALLY HUSBAND AND WIFE CONJOIN HAPPILY. JUST WAIT FOR THE ACHIEVEMENT TO BE COMPLETED TO PAY COURT TO THE NORTH PALACE GATE; IN THE LIGHT OF NINEFOLD MIST YOU RIDE A FLYING PHOENIX.

Komjathy criticizes both the style and language of Cleary's translation, noting, "Except for punctuation, Cleary’s format gives the reader little indication that he or she is reading poetry." He also says, "Cleary’s translation choices for various technical terms deviate from more standard renderings, and thus without knowledge of Chinese and the Chinese text one cannot easily identify the relevant correlates." One example concerns two Celestial stems.

Cleary translates the most technical section of this stanza, line five, as “Starting with Heaven-Earth and Earth-Earth as go-betweens.” With no annotation, the reader wonders what Chinese phrases Cleary is translating. An educated reader’s initial guess might be Yijing hexagrams. As it turns out, the Chinese text has the characters wu 戊 and ji 己, the fifth and sixth of the ten Celestial Stems (tiangan 天干), respectively. Cleary does not provide an explanation for or introduction to such choices, although Understanding Reality, unlike his later publications, contains a glossary of terms.

He suggests a "more accurate and technical translation":

[If you wish to] study immortality, you should study celestial immortality (tianxian);

This alone is the most superior doctrine of the Golden Elixir (jindan).
When the two things meet [?], the emotions (qing) and innate nature (xing) are joined;
The Five Phases (wuxing) completely settle, Tiger and Dragon entwine.
From the beginning, wu and ji are taken as the matchmaker,
Thus causing husband and wife to be protected in commingled bliss.
Simply wait until the practice (gong) is completed, [then] face towards the Northern Tower (beique);

Amidst the illumination of nine vapors, you mount an auspicious phoenix.

Komjathy concludes, "Although Cleary’s translation has certain deficiencies, he seems intent on staying close to the text and rendering it in a way that generally respects the work’s complexity."

Compare how Paul Crowe translates this same stanza:

[If you are going to] study immortality then it must be celestial immortality,

[which] alone is the most superior doctrine of the golden elixir.
When the two things come together [then the] emotions and inner nature coalesce,
the dragon and tiger entwine where the five phases become complete.
From the beginning rely upon jueji [sic, wuji] to be the matchmaker;
then cause the husband and wife to be calm and joyous.
Simply wait until the work is completed [then] pay court to the Northern Palace;

amidst the brightness in nine rose-coloured clouds [you will] ride the auspicious luan bird.

For translating the thorny wuji expression, Crowe notes, "Wu 戊 and ji 己 refer to the fifth and sixth of the ten celestial stems (tiangan 天干) which, in combination, correspond to the earth phase which occupies the central position."

There is also a poetic translation by Richard Bertschinger. It includes his commentary based upon classical sources. Here is his translation of the same stanza with commentary:

"A Study of Fairyhood must be
A Study of natural Fairyhood
Since the Golden Elixir itself
Is quite evidently unique.
As the Two Materials assemble,
What you feel and what you are unite -
The Cycle of Five coiling entirely
Together as Dragon and Tiger:

At their Origin they rely on the Soil,
There as Go-between,
Enabling Husband and Wife
To protect their happy home together,
Awaiting only the Task's completion -
Dawn at the Northern Gate,
Nine Times layered clouds with Red Rays of light,

We hold back our fabulous Luan..."

Reality is all around us... all around in the natural world. The tender dusk; the beautiful dawn; an unfolding flower; the soaking mist; a snowfall; the moon rise, all is evidently unique. Two Materials are involved in this delicate dance of living water and flame - the central lines of Kan (water) and Li (fire); the one source essence (yuan jing), the other source spirit (yuan shen). As what we feel and are within meld, body and mind are one, tumbling Dragon and Tiger - Wood and Fire, Gold and Water amixed. Praise be to the Soil! Dear Kun-mother, match-maker, breasted woman, Dark Female! She stands as go-between, protecting our happy home. The Elixir born, dawn breaks at the Northern Gate of Kan, the sun rises on a chilly dawn - its first warm rays bless our cold bodies; the clouds ablaze, the sandals on our feet strong. Hold back your fabulous steeds ... it does not bode well to release too soon."

And finally, here is how Fabrizio Pregadio translates the same verses:

If you study immortality,
you should study celestial immortality:
only the Golden Elixir
is the highest principle.
When the two things meet,
emotions and nature join one another;
where the five agents are whole,
Dragon and Tiger coil.

Rely in the first place on wu and ji
that act as go-betweens,
then let husband and wife
join together and rejoice.
Just wait until your work is achieved
to have audience at the Northern Portal,
and in the radiance of a ninefold mist
you will ride a soaring phoenix.

In his notes, Pregadio remarks that the imagery of the final four verses is similar to the one found in a passage of the Zhouyi cantong qi (see also the French Wikipedia page):

With the Way completed and Virtue fulfilled,
withdraw, stay concealed, and wait for your time.
The Great One will send forth his summons,
and you move your abode to the Central Land.
Your work concluded, you ascend on high
to obtain the Register and receive the Chart.

The last line of the Cantong qi passage refers to receiving consecration as an Immortal.
