= Guanxiu =

Buddhist monk, painter, poet, and calligrapher (832–912)

- Born: 832; Lanxi, Zhejiang
- Died: 912 (aged 79–80); Chengdu
- Known for: Painting
- Notable work: Sixteen Arhats
- Movement: Buddhist painter

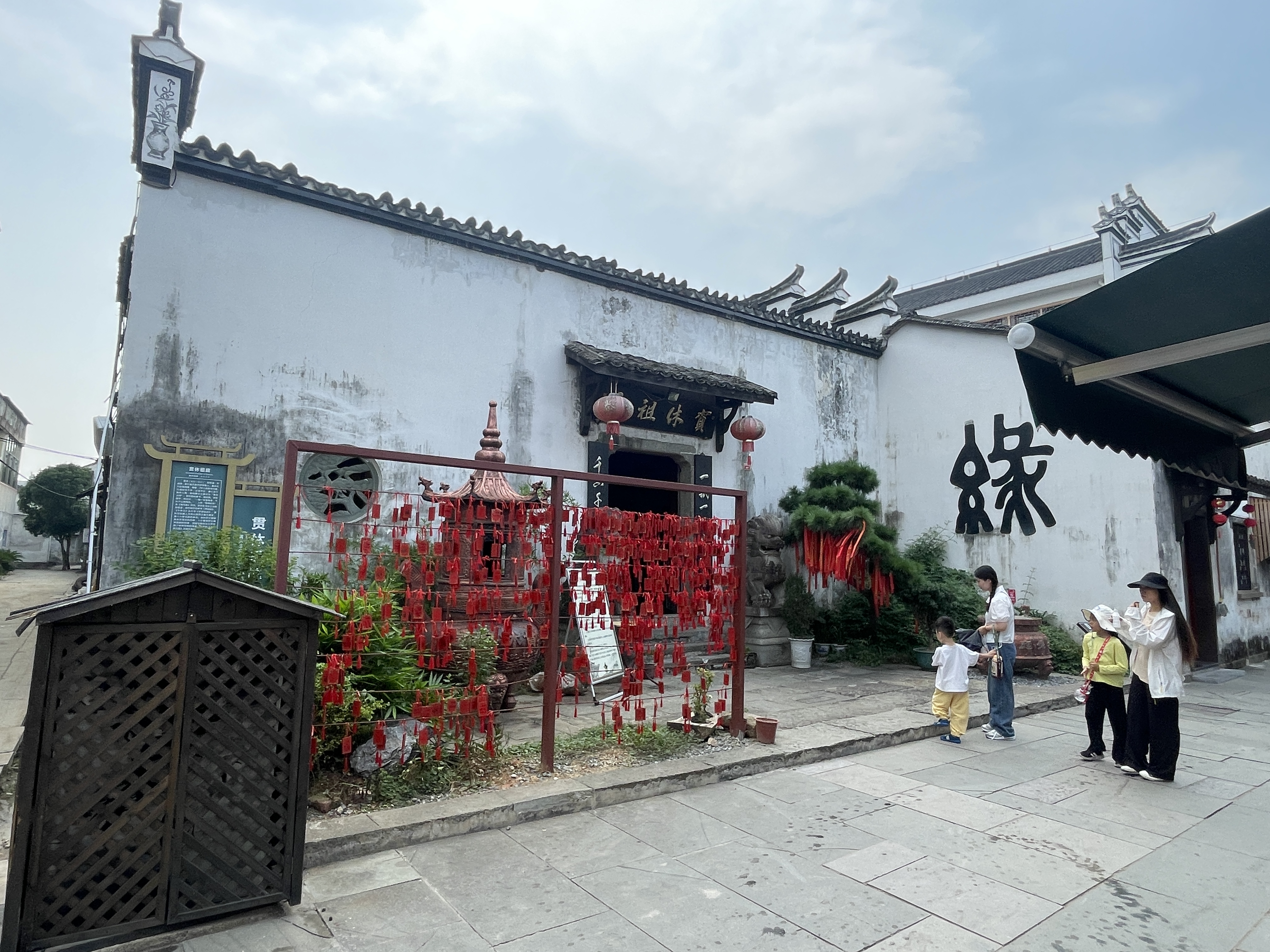
Guan Xiu's Temple in Youbu, Lanxi, Zhejiang

Guanxiu (simplified Chinese: 贯休; traditional Chinese: 貫休; pinyin: Guànxiū; Wade–Giles: Kuan-hsiu) was a celebrated Buddhist monk, painter, poet, and calligrapher. His greatest works date from the Five Dynasties and Ten Kingdoms period. The collapse of the central Tang government in 907, meant artists and craftsmen lost their most powerful patrons. The imperial Tang court had inspired a golden age of literature and art at its apogee. The various provincial courts who claimed to represent a continuation of the tradition of Tang government also claimed continuity in the arts and culture. The state of the Former Shu had acted as the traditional western sanctuary ever since Emperor Xuanzong had sought refuge there during the An Shi Rebellion in 755. By the collapse of the Tang dynasty something like a miniature Tang court existed at Chengdu. Guanxiu arrived in Chengdu in 901, and remained there until his death.

Wang Jian, the founding emperor of the Former Shu, bestowed upon him the honorific title Great Master of the Chan Moon (Chanyue dashi), however he is still known by his monk's name Guanxiu, which means "a string of blessings". He is famed for his depiction of arhats, disciples of historical Buddha, who lived harsh ascetic lives. He is however also known for his works in poetry and calligraphy as well; extant works exist for all three forms.

After Guanxiu's death, Shi Ke rose to prominence as a Chan painter.

== Arhats ==
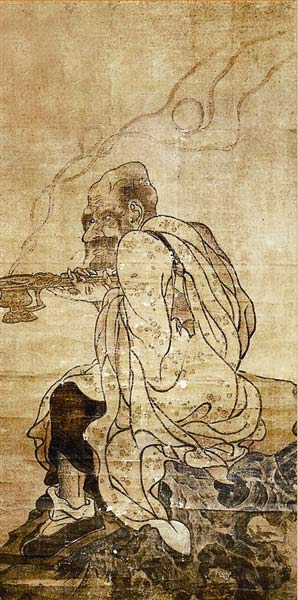
One arhat depicted by Guanxiu

In particular Guanxiu is known for his depiction of the eighteen arhats particular to Chinese Buddhism. Chinese artists had been depicting them with great expressiveness and power since the sixth century, however Guanxiu's interpretations are often seen to have captured another dimension. A set of sixteen arhats is preserved in the Japanese Imperial Household Collection. This collection bears an inscription dated to 894. It states Guanxiu began the set while living in Lanxi, Zhejiang province.

Legend has it that the arhats, or "Luohans", knew of Guanxiu's expert calligraphy and painting skills, and so appeared to the monk in a dream to request that he paint their portraits. The paintings depicted them as foreigners having bushy eyebrows, large eyes, hanging cheeks and high noses. They were seated in landscapes, leaning against pine trees and stones. An additional theme in these paintings were that they were portrayed as being unkempt and "eccentric" which emphasizes that they are vagabonds and beggars who have left all worldly desires behind. When Guanxiu was asked how he came up with the depictions, he answered: "It was in a dream that I saw these Gods and Buddhas. After I woke up, I painted what I saw in the dream. So, I guess I can refer to these Luohans as 'Luohans in a dream'." These portraits painted by Guanxiu has become the definitive images for the 18 Luohans in Chinese Buddhist iconography, although in modern depiction they bear more Sinitic features and at the same time lost their exaggerated foreign features in exchange for more exaggerated expressions. The paintings were donated by Guanxiu to the Shengyin Temple in Qiantang (present day Hangzhou) where they are preserved with great care and ceremonious respect.

The Chan Buddhist tradition of painting sought to express the immediacy and intensity of the artists intuition as well as to record moments of truth in the form of Buddhas or arhats. Even by the end of the Tang dynasty Chan painters were practicing wildly eccentric works, which have only survived through contemporary descriptions. His depiction of the arhats exhibit an exaggeration of features that borders on perversity, this style is typically Chan. The paintings display an emphasis on the arhat's skeletal bodies, and bony faces, as well as the incredible age of the sages.

According to Max Loehr, Guanxiu's arhats represent the physical embodiment of Buddhist persecution in eighth-century China. This persecution nearly obliterated the Buddhist establishment. The tormented faces are depicted as if the arhats themselves were survivors of the death and destruction. In Chinese painting the themes of pain, suffering, and death are depicted rarely outside of Buddhist art.

== See also ==
- Tang dynasty art
- Chinese Painting
- Chinese art
- History of Chinese art
