= Panji, Huainan =

Panji 潘集区
- District
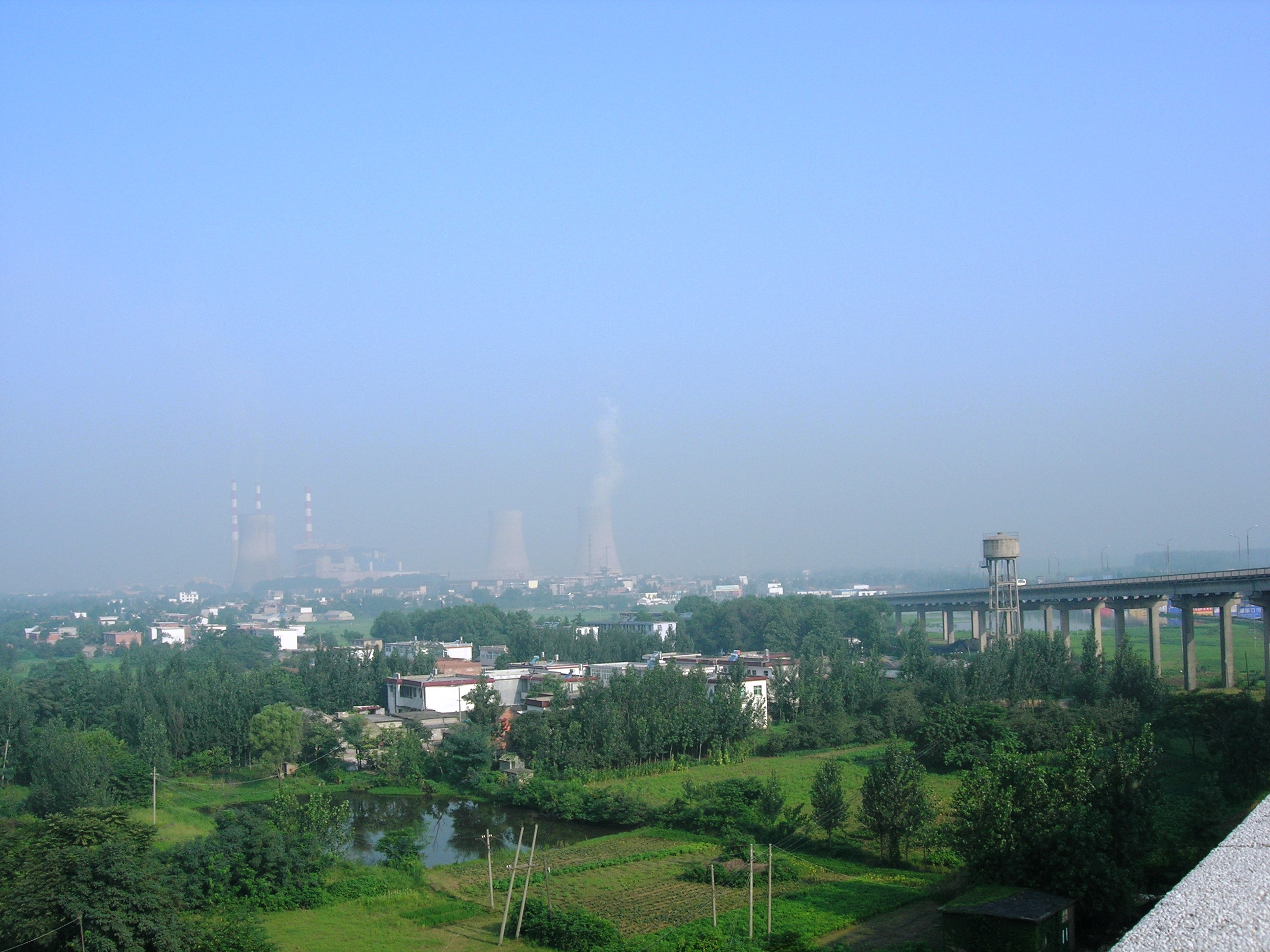
- Interactive map of Panji
- Coordinates: 32°46′20″N 116°50′05″E
- Country: China
- Province: Anhui
- Prefecture-level city: Huainan
- District seat: Tianji

Area
  - Total: 590 km^{2} (230 sq mi)

Population (2020)
  - Total: 326,077
  - Density: 550/km^{2} (1,400/sq mi)
- Time zone: UTC+8 (China Standard)
- Postal code: 232000

Panji District (Chinese: 潘集区; pinyin: Pānjí Qū) is a district of the city of Huainan, Anhui Province, China, located to the north of the Huai River and northwest of the city center.

== Administrative divisions ==
In the present, Panji District has 1 subdistrict, 9 towns and 1 ethnic township.

1 Subdistricts

- Tianji (田集街道)

9 Towns

- Gaohuang (高皇镇)
- Pingxu (平圩镇)
- Nihe (泥河镇)
- Panji (潘集镇)
- Luji (芦集镇)
- Jiahe (架河镇)
- Jiagou (夹沟镇)
- Qiji (祁集镇)
- Hetuan (贺瞳镇)

1 Ethnic township

- Gugou Hui Ethnic Township (古沟回族乡)
