= Three Treasures (traditional Chinese medicine) =

Term in traditional Chinese medicine

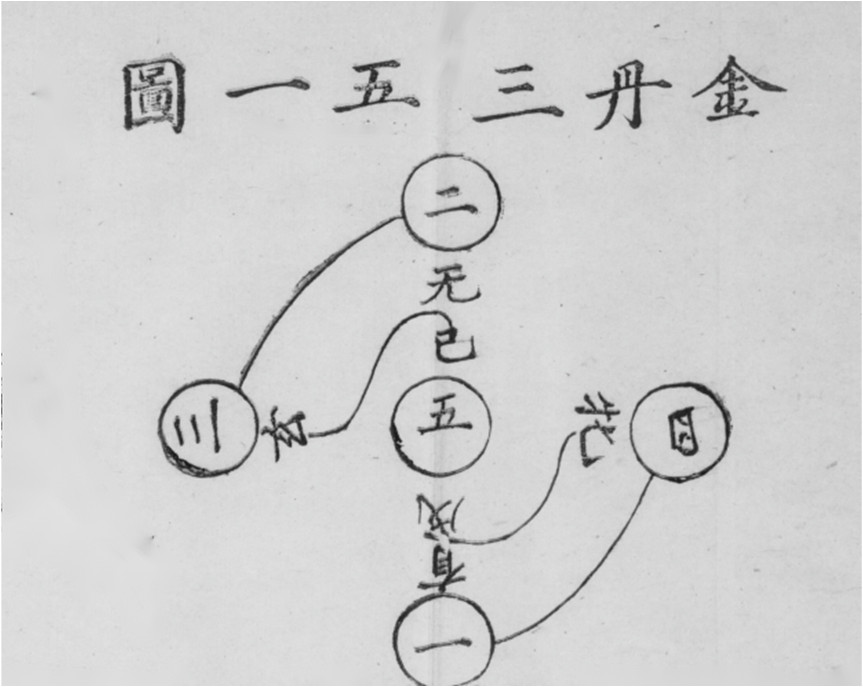
Three-Five-One (三五一, or 三阳五行一气) is a core concept in Taoist internal alchemy, fundamentally revealing the cultivation principles of the three shen, qi, and jing, through the fusion of Five Phases' mutual generation/restraint and the numerology of the Hetu

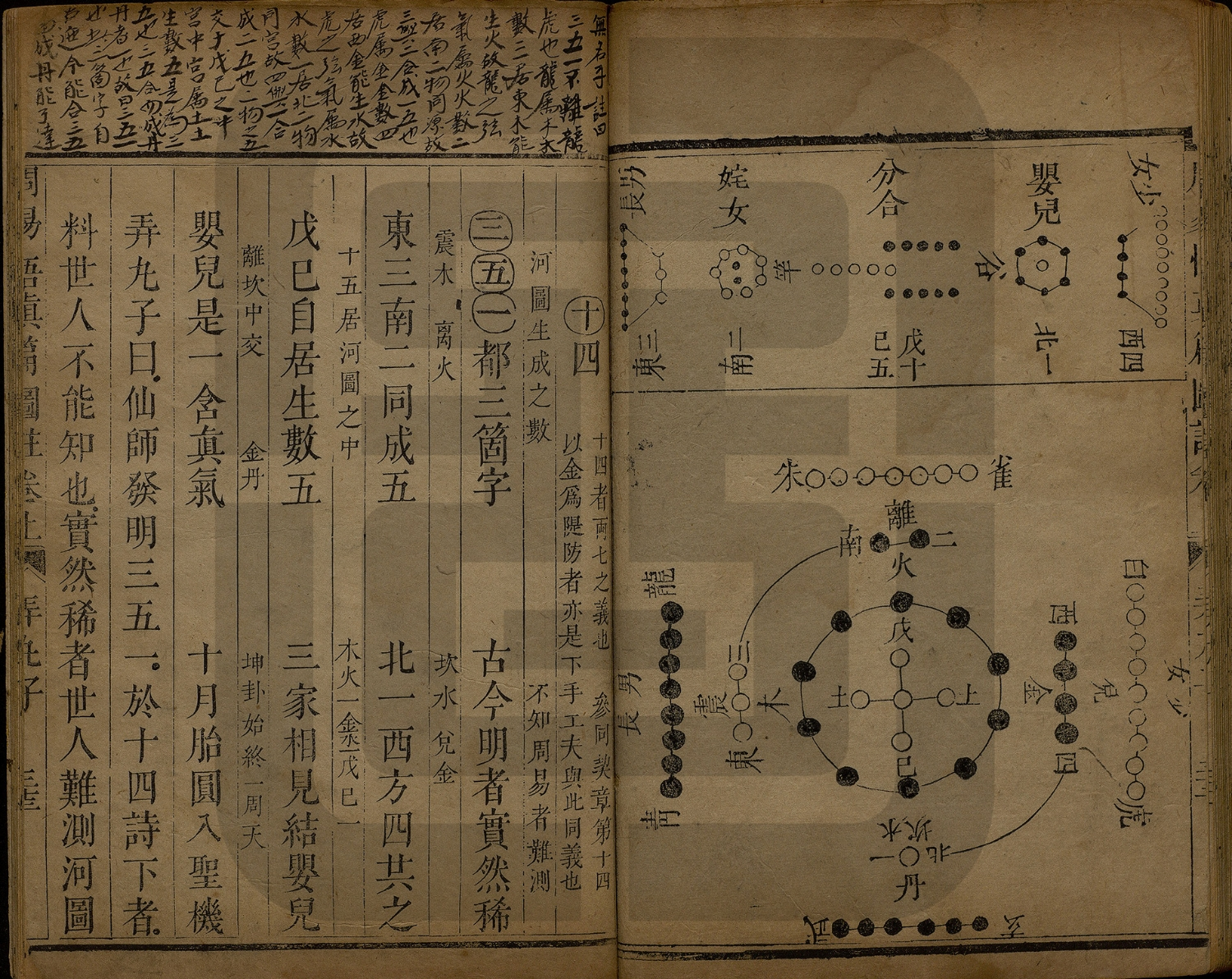
Illustrated commentary based on the diagram of Three-Five-One, authored by Ming dynasty Confucian scholar Cheng Yiming

The Three Treasures or Three Jewels (Chinese: 三寶; pinyin: sānbǎo; Wade–Giles: san-pao) are theoretical cornerstones in traditional Chinese medicine and Taoist cultivation practices such as neidan, qigong, wuxingheqidao and tai chi. They are shen ("spirit") , qi ("breath," "vital force") and jing ("essence").

The French sinologist Despeux summarizes:

Jing, qi, and shen are three of the main notions shared by Taoism and Chinese culture alike. They are often referred to as the Three Treasures (sanbao 三寶), an expression that immediately reveals their importance and the close connection among them. The ideas and practices associated with each term, and with the three terms as a whole, are complex and vary considerably in different contexts and historical periods.

— Despeux 2008, p. 562

== Etymology and meaning ==
This Chinese name sanbao originally referred to the Daoist "Three Treasures" from the Daodejing, chapter 67: "pity", "frugality", and "refusal to be 'foremost of all things under heaven'". It has subsequently also been used to refer to the jing, qi, and shen and to the Chinese Buddhist concept and interpretation of the Three Jewels, first the Fó (佛) The Buddha or enlightened one, Fǎ (法) The Dharma or teachings and Sēng (僧)The Sangha, the Monastic community.

In long-established Chinese traditions, the "Three Treasures" are the essential energies sustaining human life the cosmological arrangement is:

- Shen (神) "Cosmological Spirit; soul, mind; god, deity; supernatural abilities and yang activity, is associated with the Heart and lungs in the upper thoracic cavity"
- Qi (氣) Qi can mean many things and is completely dependent on context. In this case it is about the blending of Shen and Jing, the above and below or Heaven and Earth as seen in the meaning of the character for Qi, rice (Jing) bellow and vapour (Shen) above, this in turn is what gives rise to the quality of experience and expression in and to life. It is the abdominal cavity that provides digestion and cognition giving rise to the 10 thousand things.
- Jing (精) "nutritive essence, essence; ancestral spirit, extract; refined, perfected yin in nature, lower pelvic cavity"

This Shen-qi-Jing ordering is more commonly used than the variants qi-jing-shen and Jing-qi-Shen.

== Neidan ==
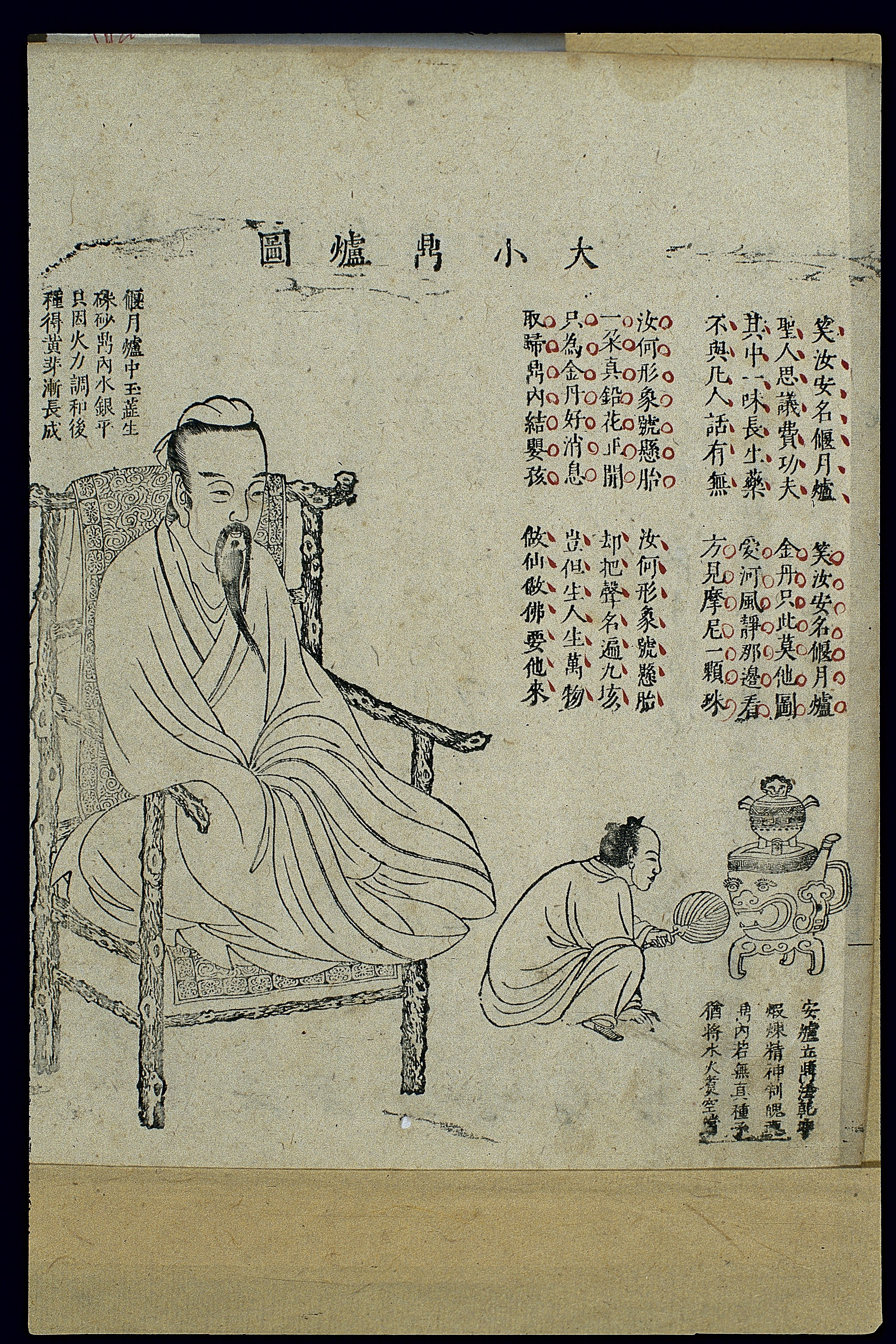
Woodcut illustration of the 'Great and Small Cauldron and Furnace' from Pointers on Spiritual Nature and Bodily Life Xingming guizhi, a Daoist text on internal alchemy published 1615. In the figurative language of neidan, the 'cauldron' (ding) refers to the head and the 'furnace' (lu) to the abdomen; the 'great cauldron' is the place of the refinement of jin, qi, and shen

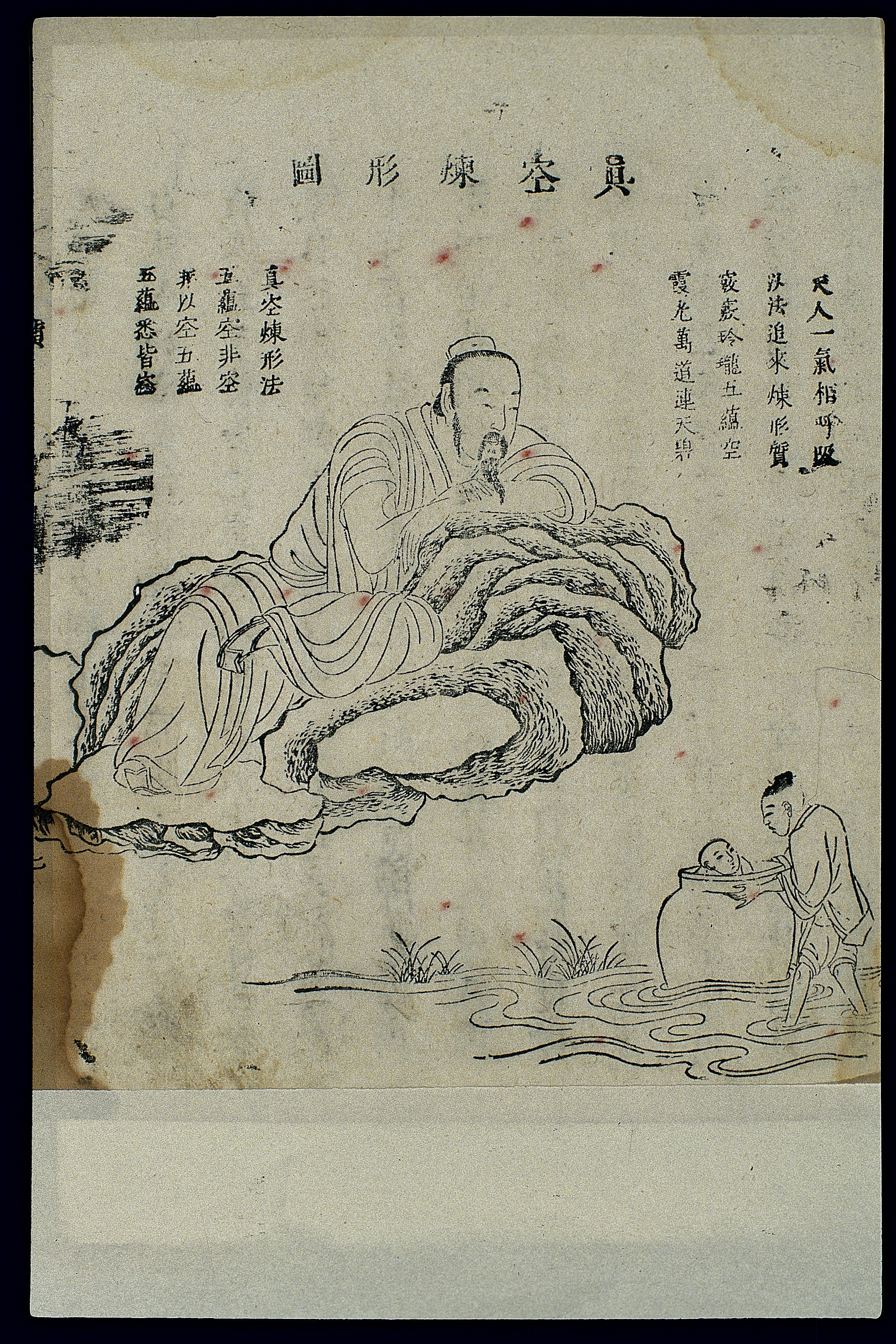
Woodcut illustration of the practice known as 'Refining form in the True Void' (zhenkong lianxing) from 1615 Xingming guizhi

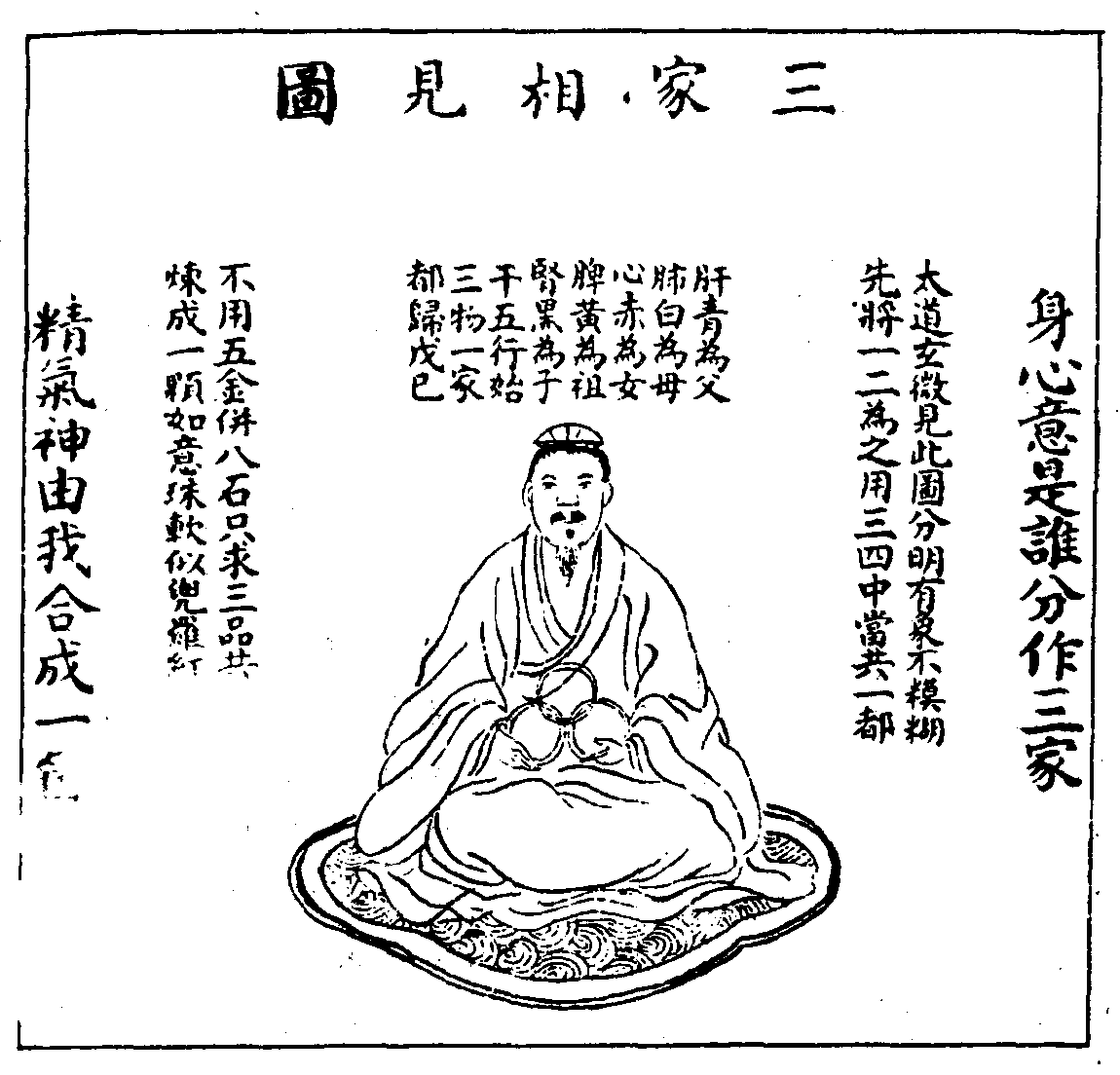
The Three Vitalities Meeting 三家相見圖, 1615 Xingming guizhi

The Daoist "Mind-Seal Scripture of the Exalted Jade Sovereign" (Gaoshang yuhuang xinyin jing (高上玉皇心印經), or the "Imprint of the Heart" (Xinyin jing), is a valuable early source about the Three Treasures.

Probably dating from the Southern Song dynasty (1127–1279), this anonymous text presents a simple and concise discussion of internal alchemy (neidan 內丹). In particular, it emphasizes the so-called Three Treasures (sanbao 三寶), namely, vital essence (jing 精), subtle breath (qi 氣), and spirit (shen 神).

— Komjathy 2004, p. 29

Frederic H. Balfour's brief 1884 essay about the "Imprint of the Heart" (Xinyin jing) contains the earliest known Western reference to the Three Treasures:

"There are three degrees of Supreme Elixir – the Spirit, the Breath, and the Essential Vigour."

=== Four stages ===
In neidan ("internal alchemy") practice, transmuting the Three Treasures is expressed through the sequence:

1. zhuji (築基)
  "laying the foundations"
2. lianjing huaqi (鍊精化氣)
  "refining essence into breath"
3. lianqi huashen (鍊氣化神)
  "refining breath into spirit"
4. lianshen huanxu (鍊神還虛)
  "refining spirit and reverting to emptiness"

=== Sanyuan ===
Both Neidan, Confucianism and Traditional Chinese Medicine distinguish the between "pre heaven" (xiantian 先天), referring to what is innate or natural, and "post heaven" (houtian 後天), referring to what is acquired in the course of life.

The former are the "three origins" (Sanyuan 三元):

1. "Original essence" (yuanjing 元精)
2. "Original breath" (yuanqi 元氣)
3. "Original spirit" (yuanshen 元神)

=== Xing ===
The Huainanzi (c. 2nd century BCE) relates qi and shen to xing 形 ("form; shape; body"):

The bodily form [xing] is the residence of life; the qi fills this life while shen controls it. If either of them loses their proper position, they will all come to harm.

— Huainanzi 1, translated by Engelhardt 2000, p. 99

== Chinese culture ==
The Journey to the West (late 16th century CE) novel refers to the Three Treasures when an enlightened Daoist patriarch instructs Sun Wukong ("Monkey") with a poem that begins:

Know well this secret formula wondrous and true:
Spare and nurse the vital forces, this and nothing else.
All power resides in the semen [jing], the breath [qi], and the spirit [shen];
Guard these with care, securely, lest there be a leak.
Lest there be a leak!
Keep within the body!

— Journey to the West, translated by Yu 1977, p. 88

== Bibliography ==
- Balfour, Frederic H. (1880). "Three Brief Essays" (PDF). The China Review. 9: 380–382.
- Despeux, Catherine (2008). "Jing, qi, shen; 精 氣 神; essence, pneuma (breath, energy, vital force), spirit". In Pregadio, Fabrizio (ed.). The Encyclopedia of Taoism. Routledge. pp. 562–565.
- Engelhardt, Ute (2000). "Longevity Techniques and Chinese Medicine". In Kohn, Livia (ed.). Daoism Handbook. Brill. pp. 74–108.
- Komjathy, Louis (2004). Daoist Texts in Translation (PDF). Archived from the original (PDF) on 2005-05-26.
- Olson, Stuart Alve (1993). The Jade Emperor's Mind Seal Classic: A Taoist Guide to Health, Longevity, and Immortality. St. Paul: Dragon Door Publications.
- Waley, Arthur (1958). The Way and Its Power: A Study of the Tao Te Ching and Its Place in Chinese Thought. Grove Press. ISBN 0802150853.
- Wang, Mu (2011). Foundations of Internal Alchemy: The Taoist Practice of Neidan. Translated by Pregadio, Fabrizio. Golden Elixir Press. ISBN 9780984308255..
- The Journey to the West. Translated by Yu, Anthony. University of Chicago Press. 1977.
