= Wude Zhongshi Shuo =

East Asian/Chinese philosophy for Virtues and Chinese Imperial State-hood

Wude Zhongshi Shuo (Chinese: 五德終始說), is a Chinese philosophical theory that has various translations in english often referred to as the "End and Beginning of the Five Virtues", the theory of the "Five Virtues dynastic successions" or also as "Wude (五德)" that are the Five Virtues or the Wuxing (五行) powers of Five Phases.

This ancient Chinese theory was a political philosophy of imperial China, that utilised the theoretical arrangement of Yin, Yang, Wuxing (五行), (Five Phases) and the celestial stems and branches. Traditionally this system was used to legitimize the rise, fall, and succession of ruling dynasties through calculation of Tianming (天命) or the mandate of Heaven.

Historically within this theory advisors to emperors applied this system to prove imperial legitimacy, dictated through the wuxing system the state symbols, imperial court colours, flags, banners, official numbers, and calendar calculations for the most auspicious and impactful earthly human results that were all based on the ruling dynasty's designated wude phase or element.

The implementation of this meant that dynasty transitions of imperial rain followed one of two elemental cycles that was called the conquering, overacting or destructive ke cycle (克 kè, Xiangke), an example of this is where a new dynasty would have violently overthrown its predecessor by "destroying" its Virtue, or the other by a more passive arrangement that was called, the generative and promoting sheng cycle (生 shēng, xiangsheng), this therefore in theory would have justified political-philosophical and peaceful abdications by claiming that this new dynasty was naturally birthed, therefore had the right to rull under the virtue of the old. The Wude doctrine remained a core pillar of Chinese political theology right up until the Song dynasty, when famous scholars came to be like Ouyang Xiu a Confucian official 士大夫 (shìdàfū), he rejected the cosmological system at large in favour of a human centre of moral based governance this shifted Chinese historiography away from cosmological heavenly determinism to one of self governance.

== History ==
=== The Warring States Foundations ===
The development and consolidation of this theory was during the Waring States period and is historically attributed and systemized by and to the Chinese philosopher Zou Yan (c. 305–240 BCE), from the School of Yin-Yang. Through the cosmological intersectional theory of the Wuxing (Five Phases) that describes the physical and energetic elements that govern, maintain and evolve the natural or human world according to the theory of Sanbao, Zou Yan applied this theory to the workings of human sociological life and statecraft. According to early texts like the Shiji (Records of the Grand Historian), Zou travelled to various regional courts, using this Ming madated (The rule of Heaven) based cosmological theatrical framework to advise rulers of the rise and fall of states based on the shifts of cosmic Heavenly virtues or powers based on the concept of De.

=== The Qin Dynasty ===
Qin Shi Huang, 秦始皇 (221–206 BCE)

The Qin Dynasty was the first recorded historically for the implementation of the Wude system during the unification of China (221–206 BCE). It was the implementation of the Water element under state policy. According to the Shiji, Qin Shi Huang recognised as the first emperor of China and a legalist, adopted the advice of court cosmologists who argued that the preceding Zhou dynasty had ruled under the virtue of Fire. Because Water overcomes Fire in the conquest cycle, the Qin Shi Huang officially declared that his regime ruled by the virtue of Water. To align the state with the cosmological attributes of Water and Winter it's attributed season a harsh, legal and punitive system was adopted. He also enacted a series of structural, sociological changes including the official elemental colour of uniforms, imperial robes, court regalia and military banners to black, the colour associated with the element of Water, with numerological number of six, associated with this element in Yin-Yang numerology.

=== The Han Dynasty ===
Han Gaozu 漢高祖 ( 206-195 BCE), The dynasty's founder, Emperor Gaozu was historically known as a legalist and a major Law inforcer from holding a civil service position in the Qin Dynasty.

Hàn Wudi 漢武帝 (104 BCE), Emperor Wu an advocate of a combination of Confucian legalist ideology, introduced sweeping economic reforms on the advice of his council, resulting in solid geopolitical principles and policies that created a vast expansion of China during his rain.

=== Song Dynasty ===
By the Song Dynasty Wude as a political system faced criticism as a legitimate doctrine. Ouyang Xiu a prominent Statesman Confucian scholar and historian, argued through his discourse Zhengtong lun (正統論) and his presentation of the New History of the Five Dynasties completely rejected a system that was based on mysticism and superstition rather than scientific enquiry and observations that were driven entirely by action, and Virtuous conduct and a sense of morality.

== The Two Sequences ==
As the wuxing theory integrated into imperial political theology, court astrologers and scholars utilised two distinct cyclical arrangements of the Five Phases to explain and legitimise political transitions:

=== Conquest Cycle (Xiangke, 相剋) ===
Water (水) - Fire (火) - Metal (金) - Wood (木) - Earth (土)

In this sequence, each phase overcomes or destroys the one preceding it, Water extinguishes and cools the Fire, Fire bends and yields the integrity of Metal, Metal cuts and impedes the growth of Wood, Wood depletes Earth, and Earth dams or absorbs Water. Historically early imperial regimes used this cycle to justify violent conquest and to forcibly overthrow a corrupt or collapsing dynasty, framing the conflict as a necessary cosmic realignment.

=== Generation Cycle (Xiangsheng,相生) ===
Fire (火) - Earth (土) - Metal (金) - Water (水) - Wood (木)

In this sequence, each phase nurtures and gives birth to the next: Fire creates Earth, Earth bears Metal, Metal clarifies Water Waters nourishes Wood and Wood feeds the Fire. This system was employed during the late Western Han and Xin dynasties by scholars such as Liu Xiang and Liu Xin to legitimise peaceful successions or formal abdications (chanrang). It framed the transition of power not through violence but as a harmonious, natural progression allowing the birth of a new incoming dynasty from the virtue of its predecessor.

== State Symbology and Heavenly Alignment ==
When a dynasty's specific element was established, it dictated the regime's entire ritualistic and administrative infrastructure. This alignment was viewed as essential for maintaining harmony between the human realm of affairs (the State) and the cosmos (Heaven) determining the imperial colour, numerology and astronomical associations for the fiscal year and seasonal influence on agriculture.

=== Auspicious Omens (Xiangrui) ===
In the Wude system, a shift in cosmic virtue was never considered a sudden human choice. Instead, it was believed to be preceded by celestial signs and natural anomalies, collectively known as Xiangrui (祥瑞; "auspicious omens"). The Court astrologers, officials, and political usurpers meticulously recorded and interpreted these omens to publicly demonstrate that a reigning dynasty’s virtue was intact, ensuring prosperity and good fortune or on the other hand it was to be understood as being exhausted, therefore leading to future calamity, disease and misfortune and as a consequence a new appropriate, timely element was now required for the reception of the Mandate of Heaven.

== The Wude Virtues ==
In the strict context of the dynastic succession theory, a "Virtue" (de; 德) represented the latent potentially of the Qi (energy) of an element manifesting in the human world according to the theory of Sanbao. When Heaven bestowed its mandate upon a ruling house that dynasty gained the spiritual essence,and characteristics of one specific phase

Fire (Huo, 火): Represented propriety, summer, dynamic illumination, and ascending Heavenly energy, realisation and influence

Earth (Tu, 土): Signified sincerity (honesty), the pivotal centre, stability, and the balancing weight and organisational strength of the imperial office.

Metal (Jin, 金): Emphasized righteousness, autumn, harvest, and judicial sharpness, justice and military strength.

Water (Shui, 水): Represented wisdom, winter, deep introspection, and strict, uncompromising law and formality.

Wood (Mu, 木): Symbolised benevolence, spring, growth, and the genesis of a new civilisational cycle.

== See also ==
- Wuxing (Chinese philosophy)
- Five Phases
- Mandate of Heaven
- Chinese cosmology
- Dynastic cycle
- Ziwu Liuzhu (Chinese medicine)
- Shen (Chinese medicine)
- Jing (Chinese medicine)
- Three Treasures (Taoism)
