= Ziwu Liuzhu (Chinese medicine) =

East Asian/Chinese medical term for body clock

The Ziwu Liuzhu, Zǐwǔ Liúzhù (Chinese: Zǐ Wǔ Liú Zhù,子午流注),The Chinese biological clock, know as the Midnight-Noon Ebb-Flow theory, and referred to as the Horary Clock in the west by Chinese medical practitioners.

This theory spans over two thousand years of cultural evolution that incorporates Chinese folk religion, Confucian, Taoist and Buddhists ideology. It could be seen as representing one of humanity’s oldest conceptual frameworks for what is now known in modern times as chronobiology, which is the study of how living systems adapt to natural time cycles, this ancient theory evolved from an intersection of astronomy, mathematics, self-cultivation and traditional Chinese medical observation.

== Linguistic aspects ==
Zi (子) is translated as Midnight this is the time when Yin has consolidated and Yang it's counter balance starts to build from its conception and rise to its fullness that is seen at midday or Wu (午) this continues as a kind of ebb and flow called Liuzh (流注 ) in Chinese, like the circulation of water on a never ending natural cycle of form and flow.

== History ==
This theory has roots in classical Chinese medical and cosmological thought, especially ideas of cyclical time, wuxing, yin and yang, and meridian circulation. Its formation was outside of the four great schools of acupuncture and was influenced by an ancient Chinese medical manual called the Huangdi Neijing (黄帝内经), which was a foundational text that documented and formalized the traditional concepts of qi, the channels, and what was seen as the correspondence between the human body and natural cycles, and the Nan Jing (难经), which further developed the channel meridian theory and related cosmological timing concepts.

Its broader intellectual background also reflects classical Chinese calendrical thought, including the system of heavenly stems and earthly branches (tiāngān dìzhī), which divides time into repeating cycles. In later traditional interpretations, this stem-branch framework was connected to acupuncture timing systems. Some traditional schools also related these ideas to the Tao Te Ching and the I Ching as philosophical sources for cyclic change, balance, and correspondence between cosmic patterns and the body. In this context, “I Ching acupuncture” refers to an interpretive branch of traditional medicine that applied I Ching principles to acupuncture theory and point selection that was for the treatment of illness and disease that was dependent on the patients constitution and the time of day.

The system was later organized into a more formal time-based acupuncture method, especially during the Song dynasty ,with continued refinement in the Yuan, Ming, and Qing periods.

== Theory ==
This system traditionally is used as a way for calculation of the most effective times, days, months and hours for the traditional Chinese medical physician to determine a treatment protocol that is interpreted by using the Heavenly stems and earthly branches to elicit an treatment plan that has the most effective results in this theory that is based on celestial orientation that influences the nature of life on this planet.

The Meridian points that are selected in this theoretical line of thought are called the Wushu-points, they are five specific acupoints on the distal aspects of the arms and legs called Jing (Well-points), Xing (Spring-point), Shu (stream-point), Jing (river-point) and He (sea-point) reflecting the nature of how water returns to the sea, or ocean, one could draw parallels of this ancient system, to a modern day reference made in physics to the term fields .

The theory proposes that qi and Zangfu activity follow this repeating cycle throughout the day and night.

During Yin phases, It is understood within this theory that the body moves to a Yin condition or phase that is naturally moving inward from dusk throughout the night peaking at midnight,this state includes internal rest,repair and cooling, from the early hours of the morning through the day conversely to a external Yang phase or condition that maximizes in the middle of the day or noon and is naturally moving outward active,expending and warming

In the Five Elements (Wuxing) framework, the organ clock is often taught as part of the relationship between the Zangfu and the Five Elements:

Wood: Dan 胆 (Gallbladder) 11 p.m.–1 a.m.

Wood: Gān, 肝 (Liver) 1–3 a.m.

Metal: Fèi, 肺 (Lung)3–5 a.m.

Metal: Large Intestine — 5–7 a.m.

Earth: Stomach — 7–9 a.m.

Earth: Pí, 脾 (Spleen) 9–11 a.m.

Fire: Xīn, 心 (Heart) 11 a.m.–1 p.m.

Fire: Small Intestine — 1–3 p.m.

Water: Bladder — 3–5 p.m.

Water: Shèn, 腎 (kidney) 5–7 p.m.

Fire: Xīn Bāo, 心包 (Pericardium) 7–9 p.m.

Fire: Triple Burner — 9–11 p.m.

== Clinical uses ==
In this theory the ancient Traditional Chinese Medicine practitioner used the Ziwu Liuzhu to explain and track daily patterns of symptoms to guide their acupuncture point selections for treatment and lifestyle recommendations for patients. Practitioners related a patient’s symptoms to the time of day they worsen or improve and was also used in some acupuncture systems to determine point selection based on celestial timing for optimal healing benefits and outcomes.

== Critique ==
The model remains influential within Traditional Chinese Medicine, though it is not a scientifically validated model within evidence based medicine of human physiology, psychology and ecology.

== See Also ==
Wuxing (Chinese philosophy)

Qi (Chinese philosophy)

Shen (Chinese medicine)

Wude Zhongshi Shuo

Meridian (Chinese medicine)

The body in traditional Chinese medicine
