= Shen (Chinese medicine) =

East Asian/Chinese medical term for Heart, Mind and Spirit

Shen (Chinese: 神) in traditional Chinese medicine (TCM) is a core concept in East Asian medical psychology, referring to the mind, spirit, and conscious awareness. It is associated with a person's vitality, emotional well-being, memory, cognition, and physical functioning, and is often described as being reflected in outward appearance, expression, and overall luster.

The Chinese character (Shen 神) also has a broader cosmology meaning that refers to god, deity or divinity and in ancient Chinese is often an attribute that is associated with a Venerated Emperor. The left hand side reflects an alter denoting heavenly influence or mandated revelations and the right is a pictorial illustration of a lightning built or universal energy that is connected to Heaven (Tian,天).

Chinese medical psychology is based on a holistic framework that uses yin and yang and the wuxing, five elements theory to understand the interconnected nature of body, mind, social environment, health, and disease. In this view, body, mind, society, and familial environment are an integrated whole, and psychological health and physical well-being are seen as being mutually influential and interdependent on each other and reflected to some extent by the philosophy of Wude (行德) or the Confucian Five Constant Virtues, known as the Wu Chang (五常).

In traditional Chinese medicine, health and illness are understood in terms of cosmological patterns rather than solely through biological phenomenon or symptoms. Within this framework, Shen is associated with the heavenly or yang aspect of the Three Treasures (sanbao), Jing (essence) with the earthly or yin aspect, and Qi is consequence of mediating the force and friction that transforms and connects the two.

== The Three Treasures Relationship ==
In traditional Chinese medicine, the Three Treasures (sanbao) are commonly described as shen, qi and jing. Shen is associated with the above and yang aspect, jing with the below or yin aspect, and qi as the mediating and blending the force between them. In this framework, Heaven is linked to spiritual influences and the Heart, while Earth is linked to the physical aspect of life and the Kidneys or lower dantian. The interaction of Heaven and Earth is said to generate qi, which is associated with the middle jiao and the spleen, stomach, and liver, and is considered important for maintaining physical and psychological balance and health.

In TCM the Heart is considered the residence of Shen that is living primarily within the Heart organ system. A peaceful heart creates a anchored, calm mind. Healthy Shen shows in the clarity of a person's eyes, clear speech, alert processing, and an adaptable emotional state. In classical TCM theory, assessing and treating spiritual disharmonies of the Heart is a foundational principle, as it is seen to direct the qi and jing through what is known as the Sanjao system, that are the rudimentary three area's of the body that include in a vertical line the thorax, abdomen and the pelvic regions. Therefore it is fundamental when the physician is presented with emotional disorders and mental health issues or psychiatric disorders

The Book of Rites the Liji, (礼记·礼运) states that "Man is the heart/mind of Heaven and Earth, and the head of the Five Elements". (人者, 天地之心也, 五行之端也)

== The Five Shen ==
The Five Shen or (五神 Wǔshén) in Chinese medical psychology divides the human emotional and physical conditions into five distinct spiritual, emotional and physical arrangements of patterns for a complete holistic constitution. Each constitution anchored by a different internal Zangfu or viscera and sense organ system that dictates mind, body and intention. This system is the historical integration of the Taoist Wuxing (Five Elements), the Confucian Wuchang, and the Cosmology Wude (Five Virtues) systems.

神, Shen Heart (Mind/Spirit), Heart Governs expressive consciousness, sleep, and emotional integration. Executive Function. Sense Organ is the tongue and Sensory function is taste clarity of consciousness.

魂, Hun Liver (Ethereal Soul) drives intuition, life purpose, dreams, planning, subconscious and creativity, It's Sense Organs are the eyes and function is long term vision.

魄, Po Lungs (Corporeal Soul) Handles basic survival, somatic sensations, and immediate reactions.Instinct & Autonomic Reflexes. It's sense organ is the nose and sensory function is smell, memory of meaning or nostalgia.

意, Yi Spleen (Intellect) Controls thinking, memory, study, and logical reasoning. Present Cognitive Intellect and transformation of information.

志, Zhi Kidneys (Willpower)Fuels long-term drive, determination, fright or flight and core survival, Volition , Sense Organ: Ears Sensory Function: Hearing long-term holding cognition.

== Clinical observations and implications ==
To a Chinese medical (psychology) physician mental, emotional or psychiatric conditions fall under a broad categorisation of Shen disturbance and pathology. When a patient faces prolonged emotional or excessive physical stress including traumatic shock, worry or excessive physical exertion this results in what is understood with this context as a depletion of essence (Jing, 精) from the kidneys or (Guqi, 谷气) the energy from the spleen. The Shen becomes unanchored, confused or disturbed resulting in mental, emotional psychological illness and pathology.

Excess Patterns and symptoms

Deficiency Patterns and symptoms

== See Also ==
Chinese alchemy

Dantian

Jing (Chinese medicine)

Qi (Chinese philosophy)

Wuxing (Chinese philosophy)

Three Treasures (Taoism)

The body in traditional Chinese medicine

Wude Zhongshi Shuo

Ziwu Liuzhu (Chinese medicine)
