= Biological clock =

Biological clock may refer to:

- Age and female fertility, decrease of female fertility with advancing maternal age
- Ageing, biological program that limits the lifespan of an individual
- Biological rhythms
- Internal clock, the timeframe sensed by the individual's body which is largely affected by the light-dark cycle
- Circadian clock, a molecular mechanism that results in a circadian rhythm in a living organism
- Circadian rhythm, biological process that displays an oscillation about 24 hours, such as the human sleep-wake cycle (the "body clock")
- Epigenetic clock, a set of DNA sites whose methylation levels can be used to measure aging throughout the body
- Molecular clock, a technique that uses the mutation rate of a biomolecule to deduce the time in prehistory when two life forms diverged
- Vernalisation, the induction of flowering by prolonged exposure to low temperatures, as during the winter in a temperate climate
- Menstrual cycle, the regular natural change that occurs in the female reproductive system that makes pregnancy possible
- Ziwu Liuzhu, traditional Chinese medical biological clock, known as the Midnight-Noon Ebb-Flow theory, also referred to as the Horary Clock
