= The body in traditional Chinese medicine =

The model of the body in traditional Chinese medicine (TCM) has the following elements:

- the Fundamental Substances;
- Qi, ( Energy), Jing (Essence), Shen (Spirit) that nourish and protect the Zang-Fu organs;
- and the meridians (jing-luo) which connect and unify the body.

Every diagnosis is a "Pattern of disharmony" that affects one or more organs, such as "Spleen Qi Deficiency" or "Liver Fire Blazing" or "Invasion of the Stomach by Cold", and every treatment is centered on correcting the disharmony.

The traditional Chinese model is concerned with function. Thus, the TCM Spleen is not a specific piece of flesh, but an aspect of function related to transformation and transportation within the body, and of the mental functions of thinking and studying. Indeed, the San Jiao or Triple Burner has no anatomical correspondent at all, and is said to be completely a functional entity.

Chinese medicine and the model of the body is founded on the balance of the five elements: Earth, Metal, Water, Wood, and Fire. The elements are infinitely linked, consuming and influencing each other. Each element corresponds to different organs in the body. The organs act as representatives of the qualities of different elements, which impact the physical and mental body in respective ways. Each organ is categorized as either Yin or Yang. The energies of Yin and Yang are conflicting yet inter-reliant. When the two (Yin+Yang) forces are united they create a divine energy, which supports the flow of all life.

Yin organs represent: femininity, coldness, compression, darkness, and submission. Yang organs represent: masculinity, expansion, heat, motion, and action.

This duality (yin+yang) must be in balance or else disease of the mind and body will occur.

Each organ governs energy channels, which distribute qi and connect all parts of the body to one another. These channels are called meridians.

== Wood ==
Wood is an element of growth, originality, creativity, and evolution.

The Liver (1) and the Gallbladder (2) are the two wood-governed organs in the body.

(1) The Liver, a Yin organ, influences emotional flexibility and the flow of energy on a cellular level.

The organ has a strong impact on the efficiency and effectiveness of the immune system along with storing the body's blood, a physical manifestation of one's true self. The Liver rules one's direction, vision, sense of self-purpose and opens into the eyes. Lastly, the Liver absorbs what is not digested and regulates blood sugar. Imbalance in the Liver can lead to great problems.

Moodiness, anger, pain, poor self-esteem, lack of direction, addiction, and indecision are all associated with the Liver organ. Muscle spasms, numbness, tremors, eye diseases, hypertension, allergies, arthritis, and multiple sclerosis are also a result of Liver imbalances.

The Liver Meridian begins on the big toe, runs along the inner leg through the genitals and ends on the chest.

(2) The Gallbladder, a wood controlled Yang organ, governs decisiveness and judgement.

The Gallbladder also stores bile. Imbalance of the Gallbladder can lead to indecisiveness along with obesity.

The Gallbladder meridian begins at the outer edge of the eye, moves to the side of the head and trunk, and ends on the outside of the fourth toe.

== Fire ==
Fire is an element of transformation, demolition, primal power, and divinity.

(1)The Heart, (2) Small Intestine are the organs that fire controls. (3) Heart Protector, (4) Triple Heater are organs that secondary (ministerial) fire controls.

(1) The Heart, a Yin organ, regulates the pulse, manifests in the face and tongue, and bridges the connection between the human and the celestial.

Dysfunction of the Heart leads to insomnia, disturbance of the spirit, and an irregular pulse.

The Heart Meridian begins in the chest moves to the inner aspect of the arm down to the palm of the hand and ends on the pinky.

(2)The Small Intestine, a Yang organ, separates pure food and fluid essences from the polluted.

The pure essences are distributed to the spleen while the polluted are sent to the bladder and the large intestine.

Dysfunction of the Small Intestine can lead to bowel problems and a sense of distrust of one's self.

The Small Intestine Meridian begins on the pinky, moves to the underside of the arm, up to the top of the shoulder blade, the neck, and ends on the front of the ear.

(3) The Heart Protector, a Yin organ, shields the heart. It filters psychic inclinations and stabilizes emotions.

A problem with the Heart Protector can lead to anxiety and heart palpitations.

The Heart Protector Meridian begins on the chest, travels through the armpit to the arm and ends on the top of the middle finger.

(4) The Triple Heater, a Yang organ, disperses fluids throughout the body and regulates the relationship between all organs.

The Triple Heater Meridian begins on the ring finger, moves up the back of the arm to the side of the neck, goes around the ear and ends of the eyebrow.

== Earth ==
Earth is an element of fertility, cultivation, femininity, and wrath.

Earth governs the Spleen (1) and the Stomach (2).

(1) The Spleen, a Yin organ, regulates digestion and the metabolism. It also holds the flesh and organs in their proper place while directing the movement of ascending fluids and essences. Mentally, the Spleen aids in concentration.

Imbalance of the Spleen leads worry and pensive behaviour, chi deficiencies, diarrhea, organ prolapses, and headaches,

The Spleen Meridian begins at the big toe, moves to the inner aspect of the leg, up to the front of the torso, and ends on the side of the trunk.

(2) The Stomach, the most active yang organ, breaks down food and controls the descending movement of chi.

Imbalance of the stomach leads to vomiting and belching.

The Stomach Meridian begins below the eye, moves down the front of the face, torso, to the outer part of the leg, and ends on the third toe.

== Metal ==
Metal is an element of purity, treasure, and masculinity.

Metal controls the Lungs (1) and the Large Intestine (2).

(1) The Lungs, a Yin organ, draws in pure chi by inhalation and eliminates impurities by exhalation. The lungs also disperse bodily fluids, defend the body from a cold or flu, govern the sense of smell, and open in the nose.

Dysfunction of the Lungs leads to colds, the flu, phlegm, and asthma.

The Lung Meridian begins at the chest moves to the inner arm, palm, and ends on the thumb.

(2) The Large Intestine, a Yang organ, controls the removal of waste and feces.

Imbalance in the Large Intestine leads to constipation, diarrhea and the inability to emotionally detach and let go.

The Large Intestine Meridian begins on the forefinger, moves to the back of the arm, shoulder, side of the neck, cheek, and ends beside the opposite nostril.

== Water ==
Water is an element of life and death.

Water governs the Kidneys (1) and the Bladder (2).

(1) The Kidneys, a Yin organ, are the source of all the Yin and Yang energy in the body.

The Kidneys also govern the endocrine system, receive air from the lungs, govern bones, govern teeth, control water in the body, and store essence. Dysfunction of the Kidneys leads to deficiencies of Yin or Yang.

As the Kidneys are connected to the spinal cord the "sea of marrow" the brain when unbalanced can systemic reproductions, It also leads to imbalanced hormones, weak bones, an impaired sex drive, and dizziness. Water in excess leads to bipolar disorder. Depressive episodes are characterized by Kidney Yin excess while manic episodes are characterized by Kidney Yang excess.

The Kidney Meridian begins on the sole, moves up the inner leg to the groin, up the trunk, and ends under the collarbone.

(2) The Bladder, a Yang organ, stores and removes fluid from the body by receiving Kidney chi.

Imbalance of the Bladder leads to frequent or uncontrolled urination.

The Bladder Meridian begins in the corner of the eye, moves down the back, and ends on the back of the knee. The Bladder also has another line, which starts alongside the previous line, moves down to the outer edge of the foot and ends on the small toe.

== See also ==
- Traditional Chinese medicine
