= Bao Mai (Chinese medicine) =

Term in traditional Chinese medicine

In traditional Chinese medicine (TCM), the Bao Mai (胞脉) is the connection pathway between the womb known as Bao Gong (胞宫) and the heart or Shen (神).

Bao Mai Chinese connection between the Heart and Womb

The Bao Gong another concept in TCM is revered not merely as an isolated anatomical structure, but as an Extraordinary Fu, poetically translated as the Palace of the Child or the Fetal Palace. Rather than being viewed through a purely physical lens, TCM defines the womb and uterus by its dynamic energetic functions: it governs menstruation, fertility and a woman's core emotional wellness.

== The Bao Mai in traditional Chinese medicine ==
In traditional Chinese medicine the uterus, womb operate at the center of an intricate psychosomatic network. It is bound to the Heart (which houses the Shen, or Spirit) and the kidneys (which store Jing, or vital essence, and generate Tian Gui, the spark of fertility) via a specialized energetic pathway that is the Bao Mai (Uterus Meridian). Through this connection, the womb relies heavily on the kidneys for its foundational physical vitality, and on the heart for healthy blood circulation and mental harmony.

Because the heart anchors the spirit and the kidneys provide the root for cognitive reason and stability through what is known as Jing or essence, this axis is highly sensitive to modern life. When an individual is subjected to chronic overstrain, overwork, or emotional pressure, the resulting anxiety agitates the Heart Shen. This emotional turbulence disrupts the descending flow through the Bao Mai, not allowing the womb to take hold and alignment and timing for conception directly manifesting as cycle emotional irregularities or fertility challenges.

== The Bao Mai in Chinese Buddhist, Daoist spiritual cultivation ==
Fascinatingly, this profoundly feminine, Yin-centric medical concept was later adopted and adapted by Chinese spiritual traditions, particularly Chan (Zen) Buddhism and Daoist Internal Alchemy. It provided a conceptual framework for all practitioners—including men, or those of a predominantly Yang nature—to engage in internal cultivation. In this spiritual context, the energetic principles of physical gestation and birth were elevated to describe the ultimate realization of post enlightenment, a process known as cultivating the Shengtai (聖胎), or the Sacred Embryo.

This energetic zone in men is often referred to as the 精房 (Jing Fang) or "Room of Essence" and is located in the lower Dantian (下丹田) between the kidneys and the bladder.

In the metaphysical world of Traditional Chinese medical cosmology the womb ceases to be just a vessel for biological reproduction. Instead, it becomes a universal archetypical metaphor for spiritual transmutation—a inner chamber where the seed of awakening is safely gestated, born, and continuously nurtured for enduring spiritual liberation.

== See also ==
- Chinese alchemy
- Meditation
- Taoism
- Traditional Chinese medicine
