= Eight principles =

One of the core concepts of traditional Chinese medicine diagnosis

The eight principles are a core concept of traditional Chinese medicine based on Confucianism. The identification and differentiation of syndromes according to the eight principles is one of the earliest examples of critical and deductive thinking for diagnosis.

The eight principles are:

- Exterior and interior (simplified Chinese: 里表; traditional Chinese: 裡表; pinyin: lǐ biǎo)
- Cold and hot (simplified Chinese: 寒热; traditional Chinese: 寒熱; pinyin: hán rè)
- Empty and full (simplified Chinese: 虛实; traditional Chinese: 虛實; pinyin: xū shí)
- Yin and yang (simplified Chinese: 阴阳; traditional Chinese: 陰陽; pinyin: yīn yáng)

== Exterior and interior ==
Sometimes referred to as external and internal, this differentiation is not made on the basis of etiology (cause) of disease but location. It can also give an indication of the direction the illness is taking, becoming more external or going deeper into the body.

Exterior affects the skin, muscles and jingluo (energy meridians). Interior affects the Zang Fu (internal organs) and the bones. The general symptoms for an exterior pattern are fever, aversion to cold, aching body, stiff neck, and a floating rapid pulse. Onset is acute and the correct treatment will elicit a swift response. Exterior patterns usually involve the invasion of an external pathogenic wind as a factor, or if slow in onset can indicate painful obstruction syndrome (bi syndrome) damp or chronicity.

== Cold and hot ==
Cold and hot (or heat) describes the nature of a pattern and clinical manifestations usually in combination with Full or Empty conditions:

=== Full heat ===
This is indicated by fever, thirst, red face, red eyes, constipation, scanty dark urine, full rapid pulse and a red tongue with yellow coating. It arises when there is an excess of Yang energies in the body. It can be caused by consuming hot energy foods, or long standing emotional problems causing for example liver qi stagnation. It can also be caused by invasion by an external pathogenic factor.

=== Empty heat ===
Empty heat is characterised by afternoon fever, dry mouth, dry throat at night, night sweats, a feeling of heat in the chest and in the palms and the soles, dry stools, scanty dark urine and a floating and rapid pulse and a peeled tongue. It is usually accompanied by a feeling of restlessness and vague anxiety. The difference between full heat is that empty heat is caused by a deficiency of Yin rather than an excess of Yang.

=== Full cold ===
Chilliness, cold limbs, no thirst, pale face, abdominal pain., aggravated on pressure, desire to drink warm liquids, loose stools, clear abundant urine, Deep-full-tight pulse and a pale tongue with thick white coating. Full cold is generated by an excess of Yin.

=== Empty cold ===
Chilliness, cold limbs, dull-pale face, no thirst, listlessness, sweating, loose stools, clear-abundant urine, a deep slow or weak pulse and a pale tongue with a thin white coating. Empty cold arises from a deficiency of Yang.

== Empty and full ==
Empty and full is also commonly called deficient and excess. This distinction is made according to the presence or absence of a pathogenic factor and the strength of the body's energies. Full is characterised by the presence of a pathogenic factor and the Qi is relatively intact. The Qi battles against the pathogenic factor which causes the excessive symptoms. Empty is characterised by absence of a pathogenic factor and weak Qi. The distinction between full and empty is made more than any other type of observation. Clinical manifestations of empty include chronic diseases, listlessness, apathy, lying curled up, weak voice, weak breathing, low pitched tinnitus, pain alleviated by pressure, poor memory, slight sweating, frequent urination, loose stools and empty pulse. Clinical manifestations of full patterns include acute diseases, restlessness, irritability, red face, strong voice, coarse breathing, pain aggravated by pressure, high pitched tinnitus, profuse sweating, scanty urination, constipation and excess pulse type. There are four types of empty:

- Empty Qi
- Empty Yang
- Empty Blood
- Empty Yin

== Yin and yang ==
Yin and yang are also categorised in an eight pattern of, Yin and Yang, Interior, exterior, and deficiency, excess or hot, cold, relating to the I Ching.

== See also ==
- I Ching
  - I Ching divination
- Confucius
