= Three Treasures (Taoism) =

Basic virtues in Taoism

The Three Treasures or Three Jewels (Chinese: 三寶; pinyin: sānbǎo; Wade–Giles: san-pao) are basic virtues in Taoism. Although the Tao Te Ching originally used sanbao to mean "compassion", "frugality", and "humility", the term was later used to translate the Three Jewels (Buddha, Dharma, and Sangha) in Chinese Buddhism, and to mean the Three Treasures (jing, qi, and shen) in Traditional Chinese Medicine.

== Tao Te Ching ==
Sanbao "three treasures" first occurs in Tao Te Ching chapter 67, which Lin Yutang says contains Laozi's "most beautiful teachings":

天下皆謂我道大，似不肖。夫唯大，故似不肖。若肖久矣。其細也夫！我有三寶，持而保之。一曰慈，二曰儉，三曰不敢為天下先。慈故能勇；儉故能廣；不敢為天下先，故能成器長。今舍慈且勇；舍儉且廣；舍後且先；死矣！夫慈以戰則勝，以守則固。天將救之，以慈衛之。

Every one under heaven says that our Way is greatly like folly. But it is just because it is great, that it seems like folly. As for things that do not seem like folly — well, there can be no question about their smallness!
Here are my three treasures. Guard and keep them! The first is pity; the second, frugality; the third, refusal to be 'foremost of all things under heaven'.
For only he that pities is truly able to be brave;
Only he that is frugal is able to be profuse.
Only he that refuses to be foremost of all things
Is truly able to become chief of all Ministers.

At present your bravery is not based on pity, nor your profusion on frugality, nor your vanguard on your rear; and this is death. But pity cannot fight without conquering or guard without saving. Heaven arms with pity those whom it would not see destroyed.

Arthur Waley describes these Three Treasures as, "The three rules that formed the practical, political side of the author's teaching (1) abstention from aggressive war and capital punishment, (2) absolute simplicity of living, (3) refusal to assert active authority."

=== Chinese terminology ===
The first of the Three Treasures is ci (Chinese: 慈; pinyin: cí; Wade–Giles: tz'u; lit. 'compassion', 'tenderness', 'love', 'mercy', 'kindness', 'gentleness', 'benevolence'), which is also a Classical Chinese term for "mother" (with "tender love, nurturing" semantic associations). Tao Te Ching chapters 18 and 19 parallel ci ("parental love") with xiao (孝 "filial love; filial piety"). Wing-tsit Chan believes "the first is the most important" of the Three Treasures, and compares ci with Confucianist ren (仁 "humaneness; benevolence"), which the Tao Te Ching (e.g., chapters 5 and 38) mocks.

The second is jian (儉; jiǎn; chien; 'frugality', 'moderation', 'economy', 'restraint', 'be sparing'), a practice that the Tao Te Ching (e.g., chapter 59) praises. Ellen M. Chen believes jian is "organically connected" with the Taoist metaphor pu (樸 "uncarved wood; simplicity"), and "stands for the economy of nature that does not waste anything. When applied to the moral life it stands for the simplicity of desire."

The third treasure is a six-character phrase instead of a single word: Bugan wei tianxia xian 不敢為天下先 "not dare to be first/ahead in the world". Chen notes that

The third treasure, daring not be at the world's front, is the Taoist way to avoid premature death. To be at the world's front is to expose oneself, to render oneself vulnerable to the world's destructive forces, while to remain behind and to be humble is to allow oneself time to fully ripen and bear fruit. This is a treasure whose secret spring is the fear of losing one's life before one's time. This fear of death, out of a love for life, is indeed the key to Taoist wisdom.

In the Mawangdui Silk Texts version of the Tao Te Ching, this traditional "Three Treasures" chapter 67 is chapter 32, following the traditional last chapter (81, 31). Based upon this early silk manuscript, Robert G. Henricks concludes that "Chapters 67, 68, and 69 should be read together as a unit." Besides some graphic variants and phonetic loan characters, like ci (兹 "mat, this") for ci (慈 "compassion, love", clarified with the "heart radical" 心), the most significant difference with the received text is the addition of heng (恆, "constantly, always") with "I constantly have three …" (我恆有三) instead of "I have three …" (我有三).

=== English translations ===
The language of the Tao Te Ching is notoriously difficult to translate, as illustrated by the diverse English renditions of "Three Treasures" below.

Translations of the Three Treasures
Translation	Sanbao 三寶	Ci 慈	Jian 儉	Bugan wei tianxia xian 不敢為天下先
Balfour	three things which I regard as precious	compassion	frugality	not venturing to take precedence of others — modesty
Legge	three precious things	gentleness	economy	shrinking from taking precedence of others
Lin	Three Treasures	Love	Moderation	Never be the first in the world
Erkes	three jewels	kindness	thriftiness	not daring to play the first part in the empire
Waley	three treasures	pity	frugality	refusal to be 'foremost of all things under heaven'
Wu	Three Treasures	Mercy	Frugality	Not daring to be First in the World
Chan	three treasures	deep love	frugality	not to dare to be ahead of the world
Lau	three treasures	compassion	frugality	not daring to take the lead in the empire
English & Feng	three treasures which I hold and keep	mercy	economy	daring not to be ahead of others — humility
Wieger & Bryce	three things	charity	simplicity	humility
Henricks	three treasures	compassion	frugality	not presuming to be at the forefront in the world
Chen	three treasures	motherly love	frugality	daring not be at the world's front
Mair	three treasures	compassion	frugality	not daring to be ahead of all under heaven
Muller	three treasures	compassion	frugality	not daring to put myself ahead of everybody
La Fargue	Three treasures	gentleness	frugality	not presuming to act like leader of the world

A consensus translation of the Three Treasures could be: compassion or love, frugality or simplicity, and humility or modesty.

== Other meanings ==
In addition to these Taoist "Three Treasures", Chinese sanbao can also refer to the Three Treasures in Traditional Chinese Medicine or the Three Jewels in Buddhism. Victor H. Mair notes that Chinese Buddhists chose the Taoist term sanbao to translate Sanskrit triratna or ratnatraya ("three jewels"), and "[i]t is not at all strange that the Taoists would take over this widespread ancient Indian expression and use it for their own purposes."

Erik Zürcher, who studied influences of Buddhist doctrinal terms in Taoism, noted two later meanings of sanbao: Tao 道 "the Way", jing 經 "the Scriptures", and shi 師 "the Master" seems to be patterned after Buddhist usage; Tianbao jun 天寶君 "Lord of Celestial Treasure", Lingbao jun 靈寶君 "Lord of Numinous Treasure", and Shenbao jun 神寶君 "Lord of Divine Treasure" are the Sanyuan 三元 "Three Primes" of the Lingbao School.

The use of the term San jiao in Classical Chinese thought is used to explain the relationships between the ten thousand things. From the macrocosm to the microcosm the blending of Heaven and Earth leading to the interpreted meaning by humans.
