= Jing (Chinese medicine) =

Concept of "essence" in Chinese medicine

In traditional Chinese medicine, Jing (Chinese: 精; pinyin: jīng; Wade–Giles: ching¹) is the Chinese word for "essence", specifically kidney essence. Jing, along with qi and shen, is considered one of the Three Treasures.

== Description ==
According to traditional Chinese medical theory, jing or essence is foundational in controlling and regulating conception, maturation, health and longevity in a person's lifespan. It can be summarised in two parts: the yin, being congenital or prenatal, and the yang, being postnatal or acquired. Prenatal or inherited jing is congenital during the gestation of the foetus inside the womb combining the father's sperm and the mother's ovum. Postnatal jing or acquired essence is after birth, through food, water, oxygen, as well as environmental and social conditions. The concept is expounded in the Bagua and within the I Ching.

The yin and yang jing transform to create, replenish and nourish each other. The yuan yang (阳元气) or yang yin circulate through the eight extraordinary vessels, insuring, in this case, reproductive health and function. This mechanism starts at the Ming men (命門), the "Gate of Vitality" or "Life Gate", building the marrow stored deep within the skeletal system all the way up to the brain through what is known as the sea of marrow or spinal cord, becoming, nourishing and once again transforming to blood, body fluids that include semen, and the ova. Problems with jing deficiency can lead to impotence, and infertility for both men and women.

== Allocation ==
One is said to be born with a fixed amount of prenatal jing (also called yuanqi), but can also acquire jing from diet and various forms of self-cultivation practices (修身 xiūshēn), through the application of correct exercise, education, and meditative endeavours.

Theoretically, jing is consumed continuously in day-to-day life – by everyday stresses including excessive mental pressure, physical activity and/or force including illness, substance abuse and sexual intemperance.

Prenatal jing is very difficult to be renewed, and it is said to be completely consumed upon death.

== Restoration ==
Jing is therefore considered quite important for longevity and immortality in the cultivation theory of traditional Chinese medicine; many disciplines related to qigong are devoted to the replenishment of "lost" jing by restoration of the postnatal jing and transformation of shen. In particular, the internal martial arts tai chi, the Circle Walking of Baguazhang and the middle path of Wuxingheqidao may be used to preserve prenatal jing and build postnatal jing, if performed correctly. In traditional Chinese herbal medicine, ginseng is widely used to bolster and support the jing.

An early mention of the term in this sense is in a 4th-century BCE chapter called Neiye ("Inner Training") of a larger text compiled during the Han dynasty, the Guanzi.

== Common misconceptions with Chinese language interpretation ==
Jing is often confused with the related concept of jin (勁 – "strength" or "energy"), as in Neijin, meaning "internal power"; or with jīng (經 – "classic"), which appears in many early Chinese book titles, such as the Huangdi Neijing, Yijing a.k.a. I Ching, and Chajing.

== See also ==
- Traditional Chinese medicine
- Dantian
- TCM model of the body
- Triple burner
- Yuan qi
- Shen
- Glossary of alternative medicine
- Fukushin

== Further references ==
- Chang, Stephen T. The Great Tao; Tao Longevity; ISBN 0-942196-01-5 Stephen T. Chang
- Kaptchuck, Ted J., The Web That Has No Weaver; Congdon & Weed; ISBN 978-0-8092-2933-8
- Maciocia, Giovanni, The Foundations of Chinese Medicine: A Comprehensive Text for Acupuncturists and Herbalists; Churchill Livingstone; ISBN 0-443-03980-1
- Ni, Mao-Shing, The Yellow Emperor's Classic of Medicine : A New Translation of the Neijing Suwen with Commentary; Shambhala, 1995; ISBN 1-57062-080-6
- Holland, Alex Voices of Qi: An Introductory Guide to Traditional Chinese Medicine; North Atlantic Books, 2000; ISBN 1-55643-326-3
- Unschuld, Paul U., Medicine in China: A History of Ideas; University of California Press, 1985; ISBN 0-520-05023-1
- Graham, A.C. Disputers of the Tao: Philosophical Argument in Ancient China (Open Court, 1993). ISBN 0-8126-9087-7
- Scheid, Volker, Chinese Medicine in Contemporary China: Plurality and Synthesis; Duke University Press, 2002; ISBN 0-8223-2857-7
- Porkert, Manfred The Theoretical Foundations of Chinese Medicine MIT Press, 1974 ISBN 0-262-16058-7
- Hongyi, L., Hua, T., Jiming, H., Lianxin, C., Nai, L., Weiya, X., Wentao, M. (2003) Perivascular Space: Possible anatomical substrate for the meridian. Journal of Complementary and Alternative Medicine. 9:6 (2003) pp851–859
- Wang, Mu. Foundations of Internal Alchemy: The Taoist Practice of Neidan. Golden Elixir Press, 2011. ISBN 978-0-9843082-5-5.
- Wile, Douglas Lost T'ai-chi Classics from the late Ch'ing Dynasty (1996) State University of New York Press, Albany. ISBN 0-7914-2653-X
