= Yuanqi =

Concept in traditional Chinese medicine

In traditional Chinese medicine and Chinese culture, yuán qì (元氣) or vital qi, innate or prenatal qi. Inborn qi (Jing 精) is differentiated from acquired qi that a person may develop or replenished over their lifetime. Further more traditionally it is said that the Kidneys are the root of qi, Left being Yuan yin and the right being Yuan yang. The transportation of Yuan qi is done via the triple warmer (San Jiao 三膲) in Chinese medicine, and is associated with the adrenal glands.

Porkert describes the concept as "the metaphorical designation of the inborn constitution, the vital potential that is gradually used up in the course of life. It may be conserved but never replenished."

The term has been used since at least the Han dynasty, where it is found in the chapter 'Lu Li Zhi Shang/律历志上' of the History Book, 'Han Shu.'

== Usage in Japanese ==
In modern times it has come to be used in a colloquial manner in Japanese (where it is pronounced genki (元気)) to mean "healthy" or "energetic", a usage that has more recently been borrowed back into Chinese. This colloquial usage of the term forms the basis of a variety of Japanese expressions, including the standard casual greeting, genki desu ka (元気ですか), which translates to "are you well?". As the equivalent of "How are you doing?" in English, it is a rhetorical question and generally answered in the affirmative.

== See also ==
- Jing
- Neijia
- Glossary of alternative medicine
