= History of the Five Dynasties =

History of the Five Dynasties may refer to:

- The Five Dynasties and Ten Kingdoms period, the era of Chinese history from 907 to 960
  - Old History of the Five Dynasties, a 974 history book on this period by Xue Juzheng and others
  - New History of the Five Dynasties, a 1073 history book on this period by Ouyang Xiu
