= Zhang Jiebin =

Ming dynasty Chinese physician

Zhang Jiebin (Chinese: 張介賓; pinyin: Zhāng Jièbīn; 1563–1640) was a Ming dynasty physician and writer. In his youth, Zhang studied medicine and served in the army as an advisor. Following a successful career as a physician, he spent his final years in his native Zhejiang.

== Early life ==
Zhang was born in 1563 in Shanyin (now Shaoxing), Zhejiang. He moved to Shuntian, present-day Beijing, in his early teens, where his father had been posted to serve as an honorary advisor in the military.

== Career ==
In the capital, Zhang was tutored by physician Jin Mengshi (金夢石). He subsequently became a military advisor as well, and was briefly stationed in Korea, although his time in the army was generally uneventful. Returning home to pursue a full-time career as a physician, Zhang was noted for his approach to medicine, which was considered unorthodox at the time: instead of targeting the symptoms of an illness, he preferred to focus on its causes. He was able to treat illnesses that had hitherto confounded his fellow physicians and consequently earned much acclaim for his work.

Following the death of the Wanli Emperor in 1620, Zhang returned to Zhejiang, where he would pen several medical commentaries and treatises. His first book, Leijing (類經), examined the Huangdi neijing and was first published in 1624. According to 17th-century writer Huang Zongxi, the book was "the most popular and valuable work on medicine in his day". Zhang also wrote the medical encyclopedia Jingyue quanshu (景岳全書), probably between 1620 and 1640; it was posthumously published by his grandson, who also wrote its foreword, in 1700.

== Views ==
According to Zhang, the ancient philosophical text Yijing was required reading for all physicians. He also tended to incorporate neo-Confucianist and Taoist ideas into his medical writings.

In his earlier years, Zhang subscribed to a school of thought in Chinese medicine known as "nourishing the yin". However, around the age of 40, he began to take a keener interest in the "yang component" of the body, believing that good health came from the protection of organs such as the stomach and the spleen, which in turn required "warming substances" like tobacco. Zhang became one of the earliest and most influential advocates for tobacco smoking. He argued that tobacco smoke contained "vitally warming and replenishing yang qi" which would support the body's major organs and allow one to "overcome a host of ailments". On the other hand, Zhang recognised that tobacco had "some pernicious intoxicating effects". He cautioned against excessive smoking, recommending inhaling "only one or two puffs at a time".
