= Zangfu =

Ancient Organs and pattern correspondences, theory by Traditional Chinese Medicine

There is an ongoing discussion about this article on its talk page.

The zangfu (simplified Chinese: 脏腑; traditional Chinese: 臟腑; pinyin: zàngfǔ) are a system of organ-related functional concepts in traditional Chinese medicine (TCM), that are built on a cultural view or belief system that has been influenced by Taoism, Confucianism and Chinese folk religion. In this view the Zangfu occupied a fundamentally different conceptual position than what is understood with in Western evidence based biomedicine today, instead of just being just formative structures, they are relationship or pattern based observations of connections and networks. In this ancient theory the Suwen (素問) often translated as Basic Questions or Plain Questions, is the foundational theoretical text of traditional Chinese medicine within this text it is stated that the zangfu were not strictly just physical organs but had an energetic component, this early text integrated a foundational understanding of gross anatomy with systemic, cosmological relationships.

In this ancient East Asian cultural view of medicine called today TCM, the zang organs are considered yin and the fu organs yang. Each principal zang is paired with a fu and associated with one of the five phases of wuxing. The zang are described as manufacturing and storing qi, blood and bodily fluid, while the fu transmit and digest substances. In TCM theory, a group of "extraordinary fu" is also recognized, with functions that combine characteristics attributed to the two groups.

The underlying assumptions and theories of the zangfu system have not been established nor verified by scientific modern evidence-based medicine.

== TCM history of ZangFu Anatomy ==
In this ancient Eastern theory zangfu were originally considered to represent physical organs in the Suwen. A few rare waves of human dissection throughout Chinese history have contributed some refinements to the rough anatomical assumptions in traditional Chinese medicine, though no fundamental errors were corrected (blood vessels remained mistaken as "thin meridians"). In this context, the influx of western anatomical knowledge lead to a crisis for TCM. This was resolved by Yun Tieqiao's introduction of Zangxiang (藏象/脏象) theory in the 1920s, which decoupled the zangfu from anatomical organs.

== Yin/yang and the Five Elements ==
Each zangfu pattern is theoretically is to have a yin and a yang aspect, the zang correspond to be yin as they are substantially formative and the fu that are more yang are in comparison as they are hollow and functional.

Since the concept of the zangfu was developed on the basis of wuxing philosophy, they are incorporated into a system of allocation to one of five elemental qualities (i.e., the Five goings or Five Phases). The zangfu share their respective element's allocations (e.g., diagnostics of colour, sound, odour and emotion etc.) and interact with each other cyclically in the same way the Five Elements do: each zang relationship has one corresponding fu that it disperses, and one that it reinforces, tonifies or sedates.

The correspondence between zangfu and Five Elements are stipulated as:

- Fire (火) = Heart (心) and Small Intestine (小肠) (and, secondarily, Sanjiao [三焦, ‘’Triple Burner‘’] and Pericardium [心包])
- Earth (土) = Spleen (脾) and Stomach (胃)
- Metal (金) = Lung (肺) and Large Intestine (大肠)
- Water (水) = Kidney (肾) and Bladder (膀胱)
- Wood (木) = Liver (肝) and Gallbladder (胆)

== Details ==
The zang organs' through the theory of Chinese medicine claim the essential functions to consist in manufacturing and storing qi and blood (and, in the case of the Kidney, jing or essence). The hollow fu organs' main purpose is claimed to be to transmit and digest (传化, pinyin: chuánhuà) substances (like waste, food, etc.).

=== Zang organs ===
Each zang is claimed to have a corresponding "orifice" or sensory organ that it "opens" into. This means the functional entity of a given zang is to includ the corresponding orifice's functions (e.g. Problems with vision are primarily seen as a dysfunction of the Liver zang because the Liver channel "opens" into the eyes).

In listing the functions of the zang organs, TCM regularly uses the term "governing" (主; zhǔ) – indicating that the main responsibility of regulating something (e.g. blood, qi, water metabolism etc.) lies with a certain zang.

Although the zang are primarily functional entities, TCM gives vague locations for them – namely, the general area where the anatomical organ of the same name would be found. One could argue that this (or any) positioning of the zang is irrelevant for the TCM system; there is some relevance, however, in whether a certain zang would be attributed to the upper, middle or lower jiao.

==== Xīn, 心 (Heart) ====
The Heart (心, pinyin: xīn) is a functionally defined entity and not equivalent to the anatomical formative viscera within the Western evidence based Medical model. As a zàng, the Heart is considered the Emperor of all the zung-fu and Regarding its stipulated functions, the Heart

- ‘’stores‘’ (藏, pinyin: cáng) the shén (神), and is usually translated as mind or consciousness; paired with Small Intestine
- governs xuě (blood) and vessels/meridians
- opens into the tongue
- reflects in facial complexion, the glow and radiance.
- governs joy (喜, pinyin: xǐ)

The Heart's function is said to be strongest on the Chinese Horary (body) clock between 11am and 1pm. Disturbed function of the Heart typically presents as palpitations, arrhythmia, insomnia, dream disturbed sleep, poor memory, restlessness, or even delirium and shock.

===== Xīn Bāo, 心包 (Pericardium) =====
The pericardium, in this tradition, includes the pericardial sac, the Pericardium meridian, the small intestine and some parts of the brain.

The Pericardium is also called the "heart protector", and, for clinical purposes, is considered a yin organ paired with the yang organ San Jiao. In general theory, the Pericardium is not distinguished from the Heart. It is also the first line of defence against the Heart from External Pathogenic Influences. In terms of the Five Elements, these organs are both associated with the fire element.

The Pericardium has a meridian named for it, which reflects the health of the organ. According to traditional Chinese medicine, it is often best to approach the treatment of heart problems via the Pericardium, rather than the heart directly.

Is claimed to:

- Store the shen, paired with the San jao (Triple warmer) and
- Governs blood

Since there are only five zang but six fu channels, the remaining meridian is assigned to the Xīn Bāo, 心包 (Pericardium). Its concept is closely related to the Xīn, 心 (Heart), and its stipulated main function is protect from attacks by excessive emotions and exterior pathogenic factors.

==== Pí, 脾 (Spleen) ====
The Pí, 脾; is considered to be a yin in nature, and is paired with its yang partner the associated yang organ is the Wèi,胃. Both of these concepts are attributed to the Earth element within the five phase or element, wuxing theory of the Earth element.

Regarding its stipulated functions, the Pí is said to

- govern "transportation and transformation" (运化; yùn-huà), i.e. the extraction of jīng weī (精微), lit. "essence bits", usually translated as food essence or gu qi (谷氣), sometimes also called jīng qì (精氣; "essence qi") – and water – from food and drink, and the successive distribution of it to the other zàng officials.
  - the jīng weī constitutes a large part of the body's acquired qì (the other part coming from respiration by facilitation of Fèi, 肺 zàng). In this spirit, the Pí is also called "root of the postnatal" (后天之本; hoùtiān zhī běn) – as opposed to the congenital qì, which is stored by the Shèn,腎 zàng. The Pí absorbs jīng weī from the food after it has been preprocessed by the Wèi and the Xiǎo Cháng 小肠 and then distributes it to the whole body, especially upwards to the Fèi and Xīn 心, where jīng weī is transformed into qì and xuě (blood). Thus, TCM also describes the Spleen as the source of "production and mutual transformation" (生化; shēng-huà) of qì and xuě.
  - the Pí distributes the water extracted from the food and distributes it to the whole of the body, especially to the Lung and Kidney zàng, and thus assists the body's water metabolism.
- "contains" (统; tǒng) the blood inside the vessels (this is also one of the functions of pì)
- governs muscles and limbs
- opens into the lips (and mouth)
- houses the yì (意; "thinking")
- governs intellect, pondering (思; sī)

Within this traditional Chinese theory it is also associated body fluid is saliva,
Its holding function the Gu qi is said to be strongest between 9 and 11am. It is said when functioning well, digestion will be good, the muscles will be strong and circulation will be efficient. Dysfunction typically presents as diarrhea, malnutrition, edema, weak/atrophic muscles, greasy taste in the mouth, or excessive bleeding and prolapse. The Spleen is especially weakened by Damp one of the Six Excesses and overthinking.

==== Gān, 肝 (Liver) ====
As a zàng organ, the Liver (Chinese: 肝; pinyin: gān) is considered to be yin in nature. Its associated yang fu organ is the Gallbladder. Both the Liver and Gallbladder are attributed to the Wood element and the season of spring in traditional Chinese Wuxing theory.

Regarding its stipulated functions, the Liver

- governs "unclogging and deflation" (Chinese: 疏泄; pinyin: shū-xiè) primarily of qì and emotions. The free flow of qì in turn will ensure the harmonious interaction of qi, blood, digestion, and Jinye.
  - the free flow of qì and xuě (blood) is particularly significant since TCM stipulates that stagnation of that flow will cause pain and illness.
  - by association via its respective element each zàng and Fu organ is the origin of a certain emotion reflected in the Shen or overall spirit of the patient. The free flow of these five (and other) emotions is thus linked to the unrestrained and harmonious circulation of the qì of the zàng organs.
- "stores" (藏, pinyin: cáng) blood
- opens into the eyes
- governs the tendons
- reflects in the nails
- Associated with the emotion of anger (怒, pinyin: nǜ)
- houses the hún (魂, "Ethereal Soul")

Its associated body fluid is tearing.
The Liver function is regarded to be strongest between 1–3 am. Its blood is responsible for the repetitive cycles of human life, for example menstruation. The Huang Di Nei Jing describes the Liver as "the general of an army". It secretes bile, which is stored in the Gallbladder. A properly functioning Liver organ will ensure that the tendons are properly nourished and not too tense or gristly. The normal direction of Liver qi is outwards. When it "rebels" it can attack the Spleen, causing nausea and poor appetite. Dysfunction of the Liver typically presents as irritability, anger, anxiety, depression, agitation, poor self esteem, headaches, dysmenorrhea, belches, a sour taste in the mouth, distension, pain under the costal arches, pain in the upper abdomen, tremors/numbness/stiffness of the limbs, blurry vision, or jaundice. Liver blood stagnation may lead to amenorrhea, blood clotting, or a bearing down sensation with menstruation.

==== Fèi, 肺 (Lung) ====
The lungs (Chinese: 肺; pinyin: fèi) is a yin organ that occupies the uppermost position among the zang-fu organs, and is known as the "canopy" of the zang-fu organs. Due to the lung's position in the body, toward the back of the chest and in the upper half of the abdomen, it has yin within yang qualities and is more yang than other zang organs besides the heart. Each zang organ is paired with a fu organ, the lung's paired organ is the large intestine. Its meridians connects with the large intestine, with which makes it internally related. The lung and large intestine are connected by two meridians, Yangming large intestine meridian of hand and the Taiyin lung meridian of hand. The Lung and its paired organ are associated with the element of metal and the emotion of grief. Each of the Five Elements have a color associated with them. Due to its association with metal, the lungs are associated with the color white. The peak time for the Lungs according to the Chinese Horary body clock is from 3–5 am. Illnesses that are rooted in the lung are most commonly due to weakness of wei qi or water regulation. Common symptoms indicating lung disease are coughing, weak voice, asthma, and fish smelling mucus or saliva.

The Lung has five principle functions:

- governing qi and controlling respiration. They take in clear and expel turbid Natural Air Qi (Kong Qi)
- controlling disseminating and descending
- regulating the water passages
- controlling the skin and body hair
- opening into the nose
- housing the po (魄, Corporeal Soul), paired with Large Intestine

Dominating qi has two aspects: dominating the qi of respiration and dominating the qi of the entire body. Dominating the qi of respiration means the lung is a respiratory organ through which the qi of the exterior and the qi from the interior are able to mingle. Via the lung, the body inhales clear qi from the natural environment and exhales waste qi from the interior of the body. Dominating qi of the entire body means that the function of the lung in respiration greatly influences the functional activities of the body, and is closely related to the formation of pectoral qi, which is formed from the combination of the essential qi of water and food, and the clear qi inhaled by the lung. When the lung's function of dominating qi is normal, the passage of qi will be unobstructed and respiration will be normal and smooth. Deficiency of lung qi may lead to general fatigue, feeble speech, weak respiration, shortness of breath and excessive perspiration.

As a general rule, the upper zang-fu organs have the function of descending, and the lower zang-fu organs the function of ascending. Since the lung is the uppermost most yang of the zang organ, its qi descends to promote the circulation of qi and body fluid through the body and to conduct them downwards. Dysfunction of the lung in descending may lead to upward perversion of lung qi with symptoms such as cough and shortness of breath. Regulating the water passages means to regulate the pathways for the circulation and excretion of water. Circulation of body fluids is a function of many organs working together as a team, including the lungs. The role of the lung in promoting and maintaining water metabolism depends on the descending function of lung qi (Zong Qi) Under normal circumstances, the lungs are capable of sending fluids downwards to the kidneys, which pass the fluids to the bladder for excretion. Dysfunction may result in dysuria, oliguria, and oedema.

==== Shèn, 腎 (kidney) ====
In TCM, the Shèn, 腎( kidney) is associated with Ming Men 命門, the gate of vitality. A famous Chinese doctor named Zhang Jiebin (approximately 1563-1640) wrote "there are two kidneys, (kidney yin and yang), with the Gate of Vitality between them. The kidneys are the organs of water and fire, the abode of yin and yang, the sea of essence, and it determines life and death." The kidneys are associated with the element water, nighttime and Winter in Wuxing theory.

The main functions of the kidney are:

- storing essence (jing) and dominating human reproduction and development
- dominating the water metabolism and the reception of qi from the air (Kong Qi)
- producing marrow to fill up the brain and spinal cord.
- dominating the bones.
- manufacturing blood
- manifesting in the head hair.
- opening into the ear and dominating the two lower yin (the anus uterus and urethra)
- dominating anterior and posterior orifices.
- housing the Zhi (will-power)
- fluid secretions are urine, semen, and vaginal fluids.

The kidney's primary function is storing and controlling 'essence', or jing. Jing is the essence of qi and the basis for body matter and functional activities. There are two types of jing, congenital, prenatal jing and acquired or postnatal jing, which are stored in the kidney and known as kidney jing. Unlike qi, jing circulates in long cycles (seven years for females and eight years for males) governing developmental stages. The function of jing is to promote growth, development and reproduction, provide the basis for kidney qi, produce marrow, and provide the basis for jing, qi and shen (mind). The ancient book Huang Di Nei Jing Su Wen claimed that essence stored in the kidney was vital for human life, health and longevity. Congenital jing comes from the parents and determines basic constitution; it cannot be altered, but it can be positively influenced by acquired jing. Acquired jing is produced from digestion of food and water by the spleen and stomach, and respiration through the air that we breath and stored and in the kidney to be used by circulating within the body. Congenital and acquired jing have a promoting/ controlling/ transformational relationship with each other, through their interaction jing is produced; all three play a part in determining growth and development, sexual maturation, reproduction, recovery and aging. Every new jing cycle prompts a new cycle of development. For example, congenital jing exists from conception, carrying on from the jing of the parents. Once a child is born, acquired jing is responsible for replenishing congenital jing and starting the first independent jing cycle which, for the next seven years in girls and eight years in boys, will control growth and development. When the child loses its baby teeth, its body begins the pre-adolescence cycle. The next jing cycle is adolescence, when kidney jing matures and causes the ren meridian to open and flow. At this time, part of the kidney jing transforms into tian gui, which develops and maintains reproductive function. In the next stage physical growth finishes, and eventually declining jing leads to exhaustion of tian gui, thus extinguishing reproductive ability. Inevitably, decline of jing leads to old age, sickness and eventually death.

All of the four kidney energy aspects are essential in growth and development. These four aspects include kidney jing (essence), kidney yin (water), kidney yang (fire) and kidney qi. All of the body's functions rely on the heat provided by kidney qi and the gate of life (the space between the left and right kidneys). Kidney jing is the foundation of the yin and yang of all the body's organs. Kidney yin and yang are the primordial yin and yang, and the root of yin and yang to the zang organs. Kidney yin moistens and nourishes, while kidney yang provides warmth and promotes organs and tissue. kidney yang is the dynamic force necessary to start the system of balancing water metabolism, which also employs the spleen, lung, liver and san jiao.

The kidney is considered a water element. As the body's water gate, it regulates water metabolism and reception of qi. The foundation of yin fluid that nourishes and moistens the body is kidney yin. When the kidney receives fluid the qi of kidney yang divides it into two types, clear and turbid. Clear fluid is sent upward through the San Jiao to moisten the lung and for the lung to distribute to the body, while turbid fluid is sent downward for expulsion by the bladder. The water gate is also responsible for regulating the opening and closing of drainage ducts, namely the bladder and anus, which rely on the activity of kidney qi. Also, while lung qi controls respiration, kidney qi coordinates inhalation.

The kidney is responsible for hair luster, production of bone and brain matter, correct functioning of the ears, and regulating the opening and closing of the bladder and anus. Mentally, its responsible for long-term memory, while emotionally it is linked to when healthy determination, or willpower (zhi) and under stress fear.

=== Fu organs ===
==== Xiǎo Cháng 小腸 (Small Intestine) ====
The Xiǎo Cháng (simplified Chinese: 小肠; traditional Chinese: 小腸) governs the separation of the clear from the turbid. The small intestine in this theory further digests food decomposed initially by the stomach. The clear, referring to the essence of water and grain and to the large amount of fluid, is absorbed by the spleen and distributed to the whole body. The turbid is sent downwards to the large intestine, while the excess fluid is absorbed by the bladder. The disorders of deficiency with the small intestine are attributable to failure to separate the clear from the turbid in the digesting process and within the psychological aspects of one's life, manifesting physically as stool and urinary disturbance, such as abdominal pain, diarrhea, scanty urine, and emotional confusion and unrest, .

The Small intestine and its paired organ, the Heart, are associated with the element of fire and the emotions of joy or agitation.

==== San Jiao三焦 (Triple Burner) ====
San Jiao ("triple burner", "triple energizer", "triple heater", or "triple warmer") (Chinese: 三焦; pinyin: sānjiāo) is a concept in traditional Chinese medicine (TCM) and acupuncture that has no Western medical equivalent. It is within TCM considered a member of the Fu categorisation of functional organs which is the hollow space inside the trunk of the body.

It is believed to be a body cavity of some kind which has the ability to influence other organs, and overall health, mainly through the free movement of Qi and fluids, the fundamental energy or life force on the microcosm and on the macrocosm it is associated with the interactions between the Heavens, humans and earth.

Within this theory, The upper burner relates to the heart, lungs and the respiratory function in the thorax, therefore in this line of thinking to Heaven. The middle burner relates to digestion incorporating the organs, stomach, spleen, liver and gallbladder, therefore belongs to human. The lower burner relates to the organs below the abdomen including the pelvic reagin, Kidneys, Bladder and the urogenital functions, therefore belongs to Earth.If the triple burner functions well, then the organs are in harmony. According to traditional Chinese medicine, the triple burner is essential in transporting fluids throughout the body, removing itching and heat regulation, swellings, and overcoming systemic problems with the relationships of interrelated various organs.

==== Wei 胃 (Stomach) ====
The Wei, is a concept from traditional Chinese medicine as distinct from the Western medical concept of stomach, is more a way of describing a set of interrelated parts than an anatomical organ. The Stomach and its paired organ, the Spleen, are associated with the element of earth and the emotions of anxiety and stress.

==== Dan 胆 (Gall Bladder) ====
In TCM, the Dan 胆 (gallbladder) is classified as both a Fu (yang) organ and an Extraordinary Fu organ. The Dan, through the eyes of a practitioner, is therefore associated with decision-making, courage, and assertiveness. Its function is to store and regulate bile (which aids digestion) and to govern the quality of decision-making and judgement. When the Dan's function is balanced, a person is said to have good judgment, self esteem and the ability to make clear decisive decisions. Conversely, imbalances can lead to indecisiveness, timidity, fixated impulsive behaviour or poor judgment and sleep disturbance.

Theoretical dual classification:

- Yang Fu Organ: It pairs with the Liver (Zang/Yin organ), it receives bile, and helps digest food.
- Extraordinary Fu Organ: they are classified to be unlike other Fu organs as it is never in contact with raw food or waste. It stores a refined substance (bile) rather than excreting waste.

In TCM, the gallbladder has three major functions:

- It stores the bile manufactured by the liver, secretes it into the intestines to digest fats;
- It governs the capacity to make decisions, take action, and execute plans;
- It provides Qi to the tendons, ensuring smooth, flexible joint movement.

Excess patterns within this the theoretical model are usually characterized by pathogenic Heat, Damp-Heat, or Stagnation, often stemming from prolonged stress, constrained Liver Qi, or a poor diet. Signs of gallbladder deficiency (虚) are:

- Emotional: Timidity, fearfulness, chronic lack of courage, and a feeling of insecurity.
- Neurological/Sleep: Easily startled, frequent sighing, and restless sleep accompanied by vivid or frightening dreams.
- Sensory: Dizziness, blurred vision, and tinnitus.
- Physical: Spontaneous sweating and general lassitude.
- Tongue & Pulse: Pale tongue with a thin, white coating; pulse is typically weak, fine, or thready.

==== Da Chang, 大腸 (Large Intestine) ====
The large intestine (simplified Chinese: 大肠; traditional Chinese: 大腸; pinyin: dà cháng) meridian communicates with the lung (肺), with which it is externally-internally related. The two paired organs are associated with the metal element (金) and the emotion of grief. The main function of the large intestine is to receive the waste material sent down from the small intestine, absorb its fluid content, and form the remainder into faeces to be excreted. Pathological changes of the large intestine will lead to dysfunction in this transportation function, resulting in loose stools and constipation. The large intestine's function is said to be the strongest between 5am and 7am. Large intestinal disease (dà cháng bìng) is attributable to evils such as heat, cold, stagnation, dampness, and wind, or to vacuity. Rumbling intestines or pain around the umbilicus, constipation or diarrhea, bloody stool or tenesmus with blood and pus in the stool, and prolapse of the rectum are signs of large intestine disease. The main patterns are listed below:

- Large intestinal vacuity cold (dà cháng xü hán)
- Large intestinal humor depletion (dà cháng yè kuï)
- Large intestinal damp-heat (dà cháng shï rè)
- Large intestinal heat bind (dà cháng rè jié)
- Large intestinal cold bind (dà cháng hán jié)

==== Pang Guang, 膀胱 (Urinary Bladder) ====
As distinct from the Western medical concept of urinary bladder, this concept is more a way of describing a set of interrelated functions than an anatomical organ. Its paired Yin (Zang) organ is the Kidney. Both are associated with the element of water and the emotion of fear.

As opposed to western medicine, where the bladders function is the storage and excretion of urine, the bladder in traditional Chinese medicine has extended functions, including how fluids are transformed during urine production. Fluids are still sent from the small intestine to the bladder for storage, but the bladder's capabilities are dependent on the kidney yang. If the kidney is yang deficient, the bladder may not have the sufficient qi and heat to transform fluids properly into urine. This could result in overly clear urine that must be excreted more frequently.

=== Extraordinary Fu ===
The Extraordinary Fu (Qi Heng Zhi Fu) are said to be six unique organs because they resemble hollow Yang organs (Fu) but function as solid Yin organs (Zang) by storing vital essences instead of moving or excreting waste.

==== Nǎo, 脑 (Brain) ====
The Nǎo (脑), translated as brain in English, is known as the "Sea of Marrow". In this traditional theory it was seen rather than being regarded as just the primary center of consciousness and cognition, in TCM the Nǎo was classified as one of the Extraordinary Fu organs (Qi Heng Zhi Fu) and was seen as the storehouse that was part of a larger set of relationships.

In Nǎo was understood as a reservoir for marrow (sui), a vital substance generated and maintained by the Kidneys. In TCM theory, robust Kidney essence (jing) is believed to directly correlate to optimal brain function—resulting in sharp cognition, clear memory, and sustained mental energy. Conversely, deficiency in Kidney essence manifests as poor concentration, dizziness, mental fatigue, and cognitive decline.

This theory did not identify marrow identical with what is understood as bone marrow in modern evidence based medical anatomical terms but rather represents the historical Chinese belief system of a kind of refined essence or substance that nourishes the brain, spinal cord, and skeletal system. With this ancient theory this substance was considered fundamental to the structural integrity and neurological vitality

In the framework of TCM theory, while the brain serves as the physical vessel for mental function, consciousness and emotional regulation are attributed to the Heart, which houses the Shen (spirit or mind). In TCM doctrine, the Heart is the supreme ruler of consciousness, thought, and emotional states, whereas the brain provides the structural and material foundation upon which the Shen operates. This division of labor—between the Heart's governance of spirit and the brain's provision of material support—represents a core distinction between TCM and Western neurological models.

The Brain vitality in TCM depends upon a specific physiological sequence originating in the Kidneys. The process begins with Kidney Essence (Jing), the foundational life essence stored within the Kidneys. Through metabolic transformation, this essence is converted into marrow (Sui), which then ascends through the center of the spinal cord in a continuous upward circulation. The marrow accumulates within the skull, forming and nourishing the brain tissue. This traditional pathway emphasizes the integrated relationship between the lower body systems (Kidneys) and upper body functions (brain), reflecting TCM's emphasis on systemic interdependence rather than organ isolation.

TCM historically recognised two very distinct sources of essence that sustain this process throughout one's life. The first was congenital or prenatal Essence is inherited from one's parents at conception, establishing the constitutional baseline for brain development, bone density, and overall constitutional vitality. This essence is finite and cannot be replenished, though traditionally it is understood that it can be preserved through self cultivation principles and practices and proper lifestyle. The second was called acquired or postnatal Essence and was seen as continuously a substance that was continuosly extracted from food by the Spleen and Stomach through the digestive process. This ongoing replenishment allows for the sustained nourishment of the marrow and brain throughout one's life, making proper nutrition and digestive function essential for maintaining cognitive health.

The TCM model of brain function carried significant implications for health maintenance and disease prevention. Conditions affecting the kidney function, spinal health, or digestive efficiency may have had secondarily impacted cognitive function and neurological vitality. The therapeutic approach toward brain health were traditionally often directed at strengthening Kidney essence, supporting marrow production, and optimizing digestive function rather than targeting the brain directly.

==== Sui (Marrow) ====
The Sui, 髓 (Marrow) is a vital, Yin-nourishing substance fundamentally tied to the Shèn,腎 (Kidneys). In TCM, Sui does not generate itself but is produced from a reserve of Kidney Essence (精Jing). When the Kidney Essence is abundant it overflows and transforms into Sui. The Sui then fills the physical skeletal system and the central nervous system. A quote from a classical Chinese medical text called Lingshu Jing (the Spiritual Pivot, 靈樞經) states:

"At conception, essence is formed. After essence is formed, the brain and Sui are born."

Sui's interconnected forms are:

- Bone Marrow: Bone Marrow fills the skeletal cavities to nourish and strengthen the bones.
- Spinal Marrow: Travels up the spine, acting as the structural pathway for energy.
- Brain Marrow: Accumulates in the skull to form the brain, which TCM calls the "Sea of Marrow" (Sui Hai).

Sui is the foundation in TCM for four critical functions that being firstly nourishing the brain, supporting the spinal cord, and fills the bones, maintaining skeletal strength and our body's defence from illness and disease, therefore keeping the body and mind healthy and vital:

- The Production of Blood: As it interacts with the Spleens food energy (Gu Qi) and kidney essence (Jing) to manufacture Blood. If Marrow is weak, Blood deficiency (anemia) can occur.
- Strengthening of the Bones: As it acts as the internal structure of the skeletal system, Strong Sui creates dense, fracture-resistant bones and strong teeth.
- Nourishing the Brain: By providing the brain with physical energy and substance for memory, concentration, sight, hearing, and overall intelligence.
- Supporting Immunity: Because it is directly tied to Yuan Qi (Original Qi), healthy Sui keeps the body's defensive anti pathogenic energies strong to protect against illness and infections.

The function of marrow carries significant implications for health maintenance and disease prevention. Conditions affecting bodily functions, health and longevity historically with this theory. In TCM, Marrow Excess (Sui Hai You Yu / 髓海有余) is a highly unique clinical state. Normally with regular organs in classical Zangfu theory an excess would indicates a pathological condition as seen in phlegm heat stagnation or blood stasis, an excess of the Sea of Marrow can be regarded as positive and a healthy physiological state. The classical text Huangdi Neijing states: "When the Sea of Marrow is in excess, the person feels exceptionally light, full of vitality, and their physical strength exceeds normal limits." This text also goes on to say when the sea of marrow is abundant and overflowing, the person feels exceptionally light, full of vitality, and their physical strength and health exceeds normal limits.

If there is an accumulation in the head or bones excess due to a excessive pathogenic factor such as Damp-Phlegm or Blood Heat the presentation is Heavy Headedness severe headaches, pressure and pain, severe restless, agitation, insomnia and manic beht. Agitation and Mania: When excessive energy turns into "Heat" in the Sea of Marrow, it can cause severe restlessness, insomnia, or manic behaviors. Pain and pressure in the long bones, when phlegm mists the mind creating severe mental confusion and epilepsy.

When Kidney Essence is depleted due to aging, chronic illness, overwork or over sexualised, Marrow becomes deficient. This often manifests as weak legs, bone disorders (such as osteoporosis), dizziness, tinnitus, poor memory, or mental dullness. There is neurological and cognitive functional involvement including a rapid decline in short-term memory and retention, brain fog that involves a pronounced mental sluggishness, exhaustion and inability to focus and blurred vision. Skeletal & Structural involvement including chronic cold fatigue and brittleness and weakness of the back, knee joints, bones, and teeth. Systemic & Constitutional symptoms include chronic fatigue and exhaustion that does not resolve from rest. Premature graying, thinning, or loss of the hair the complexion is withered,dull, pale and or darkened skin tone. Blood deficiency signs and symptoms include an anaemic complexion with pale nail beds, lips, lose of hope and drive and chronic dizziness and unsteady gate.

==== Gu (Bones) ====
The 骨 Gǔ (bones) according to TCM theory are a hollow vessel that contain the marrow that is derived from Kidney Jing or the essence of life itself. The bones are considering an extension of the kidney network as in TCM theory the Kidneys govern the bones and store essence Jing, which produces marrow and blood (calcium for building and repair ) to nourish and maintain the skeletal system from the inside out, also the brain the sea of marrow through the spinal cord. When this essence declines through aging, chronic stress, illness, or accident the bones and mind becomes brittle and weak.

Within the theory of traditional Chinese medicine the bones are attributed to the bellow functions.

- Housing Marrow: The Gǔ act as the physical container that holds, protects, and sustains the marrow.
- Storing Essence: Because marrow is a manifestation of Kidney prenatal Jing, bones function as a deep storage system for the body's constitutional energy.
- Providing Structure: They form the structural framework of the body, allowing for upright posture and movement.
- Vital Organ protection: They physically shield the internal Zang-Fu organs from external trauma.

Gǔ have the ability to regenerate as part of the healing mechanism after an accident or trauma or I'll health, including musculo skeletal growth and ongoing refining and reestablishing

The extraordinary nature of bones within the tradition of traditional Chinese medicine relies heavily on their relationship with other organs within the theory of TCM, particularly the kidneys, liver, spleen and teeth.

==== Mai (Blood Vessels) ====
The Mai act as the pathway for the circulation of Qi and blood.

==== Dan (Gallbladder) ====
The Dan is said to functions both as an ordinary Fu organ and an Extraordinary organ. It supposedly stores pure bile instead of waste.

==== Bao (Uterus/Womb) ====
Controls menstruation and fetal development and claims to be heavily influenced by Kidney Qi the, Bao Gong (胞宫) and the Penetrating and Conception vessels.

== Criticism ==
The concept of the zangfu is not identified by evidence-based medicine – the underlying assumptions and theories have not been verified or falsified by scientific controlled experiments.

The verification through trials and peer-reviewed studies for the applications of traditional Chinese medicine's mechanisms in a clinical setting are underrepresented in the West, and as a result are classified as pseudoscientific, before appropriation of the collection of current scientific enquiry and data.

== See also ==
- Traditional Chinese medicine
- Wuxing
- Four stages
- Six levels
- Three jiaos
