= Meridian (Chinese medicine) =

Life-energy path in Chinese medicine

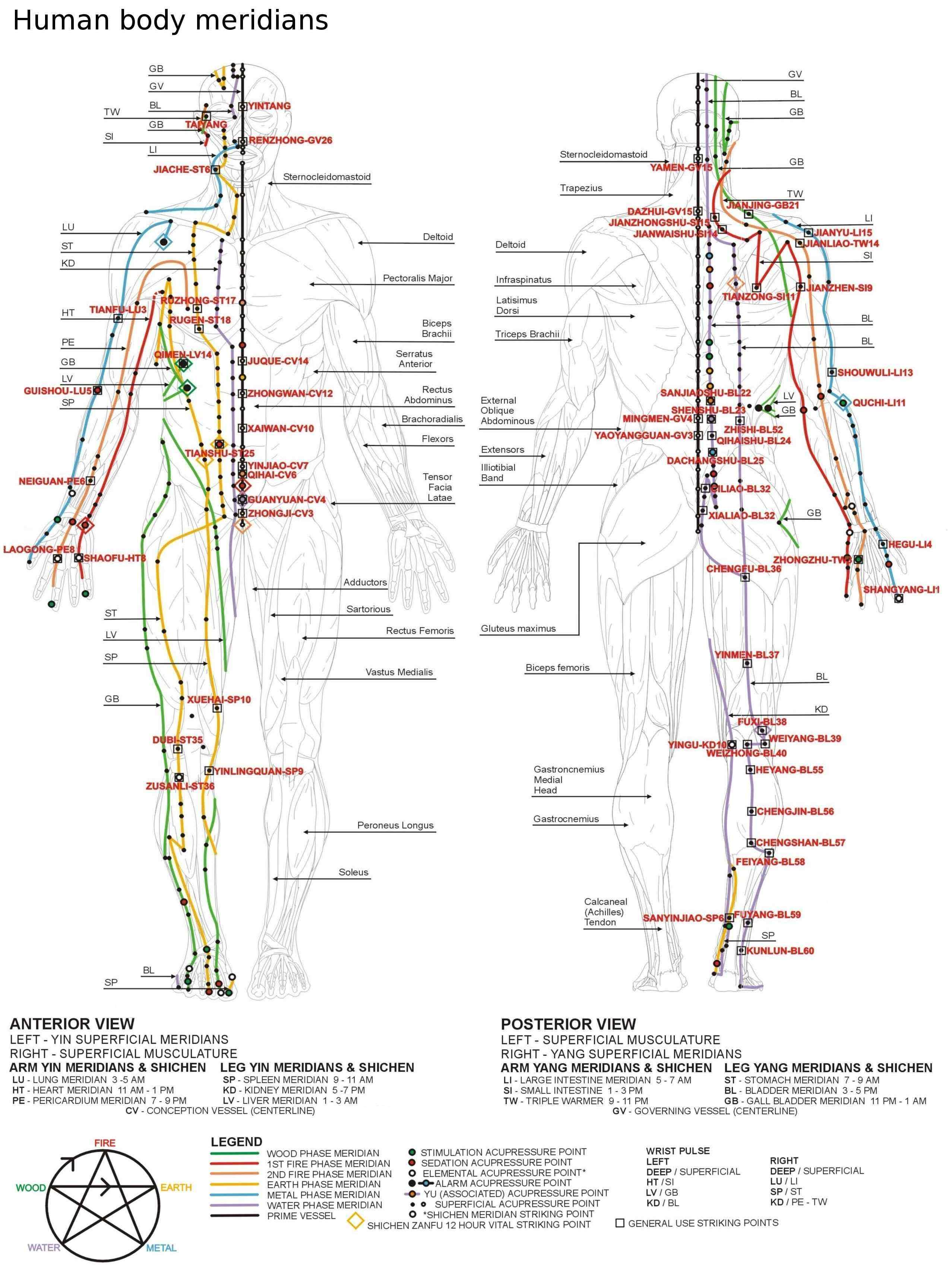
Meridian system

The meridian system (simplified Chinese: 经络; traditional Chinese: 經絡; pinyin: jīngluò; lit. 'meridian and collaterals'), also called channel network, is a pseudoscientific concept from traditional Chinese medicine (TCM) that alleges meridians are paths through which the life-energy known as "qi" (ch'i) flows.

Scientists have found no evidence that supports their existence. One historian of medicine in China says that the term is "completely unsuitable and misguided, but nonetheless it has become a standard translation". Major proponents of their existence have not come to any consensus as to how they might work or be tested in a scientific context.

== History ==
The concept of meridians are first attested in two works recovered from the Mawangdui and Zhangjiashan tombs of the Han-era Changsha Kingdom, the Cauterization Canon of the Eleven Foot and Arm Channels (足臂十一脈灸經, Zúbì Shíyī Mài Jiǔjīng) and the Cauterization Canon of the Eleven Yin and Yang Channels (陰陽十一脈灸經, Yīnyáng Shíyī Mài Jiǔjīng). In the texts, the meridians are referenced as mài (脈) rather than jīngmài.

== Main concepts ==
The meridian network is typically divided into two categories, the jingmai (經脈) or meridian channels and the luomai (絡脈) or associated vessels (sometimes called "collaterals"). The jingmai contain the 12 tendinomuscular meridians, the 12 divergent meridians, the 12 principal meridians, the eight extraordinary vessels as well as the Huato channel, a set of bilateral points on the lower back whose discovery is attributed to the ancient physician Hua Tuo. The collaterals contain 15 major arteries that connect the 12 principal meridians in various ways, in addition to the interaction with their associated internal Zung Fu (臟腑) organs and other related internal structures. The collateral system also incorporates a branching expanse of capillary-like vessels which spread throughout the body, namely in the 12 cutaneous regions as well as emanating from each point on the principal meridians. If one counts the number of unique points on each meridian, the total comes to 361, which matches the number of days in a year, in the moon calendar system. Note that this method ignores the fact that the bulk of acupoints are bilateral, making the actual total 670.

There are about 400 acupuncture points (not counting bilateral points twice) most of which are situated along the major 20 pathways (i.e. 12 primary and eight extraordinary channels). However, by the second Century AD, 649 acupuncture points were recognized in China (reckoned by counting bilateral points twice). There are "12 Principal Meridians" where each meridian corresponds to either a hollow or solid organ; interacting with it and extending along a particular extremity (i.e. arm or leg). There are also "Eight Extraordinary Channels", two of which have their own sets of points, and the remaining ones connecting points on other channels.

=== 12 standard meridians ===
The 12 standard meridians, also called Principal Meridians, are divided into Yin and Yang groups. The Yin meridians of the arm are the Lung, Heart, and Pericardium. The Yang meridians of the arm are the Large Intestine, Small Intestine, and Triple Burner. The Yin Meridians of the leg are the Spleen, Kidney, and Liver. The Yang meridians of the leg are Stomach, Bladder, and Gall Bladder.

The table below gives a more systematic list of the 12 standard meridians:

Meridian name (Chinese)	Quality of Yin or Yang	Extremity	Five Elements	Organ	Time of Day
Taiyin Lung Channel of Hand (手太陰肺經) or Hand's Major Yin Lung Meridian	Greater Yin (taiyin, 太陰)	Hand (手)	Metal (金)	Lung (肺)	寅; yín; 3 a.m. to 5 a.m.
Shaoyin Heart Channel of Hand (手少陰心經) or Hand's Minor Yin Heart Meridian	Lesser Yin (shaoyin, 少陰)	Hand (手)	Fire (火)	Heart (心)	午; wǔ; 11 a.m. to 1 p.m.
Jueyin Pericardium Channel of Hand (手厥陰心包經) or Hand's Absolute Yin Heart Protector Meridian	Faint Yin (jueyin – 厥陰)	Hand (手)	Fire (火)	Pericardium (心包)	戌; xū; 7 p.m. to 9 p.m.
Shaoyang Sanjiao Channel of Hand (手少陽三焦經) or Hand's Minor Yang Triple Burner Meridian	Lesser Yang (shaoyang, 少陽)	Hand (手)	Fire (火)	Triple Burner (三焦)	亥; hài; 9 p.m. to 11 p.m.
Taiyang Small Intestine Channel of Hand (手太陽小腸經) or Hand's Major Yang Small Intestine Meridian	Greater Yang (taiyang, 太陽)	Hand (手)	Fire (火)	Small Intestine (小腸)	未; wèi; 1 p.m. to 3 p.m.
Yangming Large Intestine Channel of Hand (手陽明大腸經) or Hand's Yang Supreme Large Intestine Meridian	Yang Bright (yangming, 陽明)	Hand (手)	Metal (金)	Large Intestine (大腸)	卯; mǎo; 5 a.m. to 7 a.m.
Taiyin Spleen Channel of Foot (足太陰脾經) or Foot's Major Yin Spleen Meridian	Greater Yin (taiyin, 太陰)	Foot (足)	Earth (土)	Spleen (脾)	巳; sì; 9 a.m. to 11 a.m.
Shaoyin Kidney Channel of Foot (足少陰腎經) or Foot's Minor Yin Kidney Meridian	Lesser Yin (shaoyin, 少陰)	Foot (足)	Water (水)	Kidney (腎)	酉; yǒu; 5 p.m. to 7 p.m.
Jueyin Liver Channel of Foot (足厥陰肝經) or Foot's Absolute Yin Liver Meridian	Faint Yin (jueyin, 厥陰)	Foot (足)	Wood (木)	Liver (肝)	丑; chǒu; 1 a.m. to 3 a.m.
Shaoyang Gallbladder Channel of Foot (足少陽膽經) or Foot's Minor Yang Gallbladder Meridian	Lesser Yang (shaoyang, 少陽)	Foot (足)	Wood (木)	Gall Bladder (膽)	子; zǐ; 11 p.m. to 1 a.m.
Taiyang Bladder Channel of Foot (足太陽膀胱經) or Foot's Major Yang Urinary Bladder Meridian	Greater Yang (taiyang, 太陽)	Foot (足)	Water (水)	Urinary bladder (膀胱)	申; shēn; 3 p.m. to 5 p.m.
Yangming Stomach Channel of Foot (足陽明胃經) or Foot's Yang Supreme Stomach Meridian	Yang Bright (yangming, 陽明)	Foot (足)	Earth (土)	Stomach (胃)	辰; chén; 7 a.m. to 9 a.m.

=== Eight extraordinary meridians ===
The eight extraordinary meridians are of pivotal importance to the study of Traditional Chinese medicine that incorporates the modalities and practices of Qigong, Taijiquan and Chinese alchemy. These eight extra meridians differ from the standard twelve organ meridians in that they are considered to be storage vessels likened to oceans, fields, or reservoirs of energy that are not associated directly with the Zang Fu, i.e. internal organs but have a general influence upon them. Within Traditional Chinese medicine they are thought to bring about large functional and physiological changes within clinical practice. These channels were studied in the "Spiritual Axis" chapters 17, 21 and 62, the "Classic of Difficulties" chapters 27, 28 and 29 and the "Study of the 8 Extraordinary vessels" (Qi Jing Ba Mai Kao), written in 1578.

The eight extraordinary vessels are (奇經八脈; qí jīng bā mài):

1. Conception Vessel (Ren Mai) – 任脈; rèn mài
2. Governing Vessel (Du Mai) – 督脈; dū mài
3. Penetrating Vessel (Chong Mai) – 衝脈; chōng mài
4. Girdle Vessel (Dai Mai) – 帶脈; dài mài
5. Yin Linking Vessel (Yin Wei Mai) – 陰維脈; yīn wéi mài
6. Yang Linking Vessel (Yang Wei Mai) – 陽維脈; yáng wéi mài
7. Yin Heel Vessel (Yin Qiao Mai) – 陰蹻脈; yīn qiāo mài
8. Yang Heel Vessel (Yang Qiao Mai) – 陽蹻脈; yáng qiāo mài

== Scientific view of meridian theory ==
Scientists have found no evidence that supports their existence. The historian of medicine in China Paul U. Unschuld adds that there "is no evidence of a concept of 'energy' – either in the strictly physical sense or even in the more colloquial sense – anywhere in Chinese medical theory."

Some advocates of traditional Chinese medicine believe that meridians function as electrical conduits based on observations that the electrical impedance of a current through meridians is lower than other areas of the body. A 2008 review of studies found that the studies were of poor quality and could not support the claims.

Some proponents of the primo-vascular system propose that the putative primo vessels, very thin (less than 30 μm wide) conduits found in many mammals, may be a factor explaining some of the suggested effects of the meridian system.

According to Steven Novella, a neurologist involved in the skeptical movement, "there is no evidence that the meridians actually exist. At the risk of sounding redundant, they are as made up and fictional as the ether, phlogiston, Bigfoot, and unicorns."

The National Council Against Health Fraud concluded that "the meridians are imaginary; their locations do not relate to internal organs, and therefore do not relate to human anatomy."

== See also ==
- Acupuncture point
- Aura
- Chakra
- Glossary of alternative medicine
- Illusory body
- List of acupuncture points
- Marma adi
- Nadi (yoga)
- Prana
- Pressure points
- Subtle body
