= Wuxing (Chinese philosophy) =

Chinese five elements

Chinese name
- Chinese: 五行
Transcriptions
Standard Mandarin
- Hanyu Pinyin: wǔxíng
- Bopomofo: ㄨˇㄒㄧㄥˊ
- Wade–Giles: wu^{3}-hsing^{2}
- IPA: [ù.ɕǐŋ]
Yue: Cantonese
- Yale Romanization: ngh-hàhng
- Jyutping: Ng5 Hang4
- IPA: [ŋ.hɐŋ˩]
Southern Min
- Hokkien POJ: Ngó͘-hân; Ngó͘-hîng
Eastern Min
- Fuzhou BUC: Ngū-hèng

Vietnamese name
- Vietnamese alphabet: ngũ hành
- Chữ Hán: 五行

Korean name
- Hangul: 오행
- Hanja: 五行
Transcriptions
- Revised Romanization: ohaeng
- McCune–Reischauer: ohaeng

Mongolian name
- Mongolian Cyrillic: таван махбод
- Mongolian script: ᠲᠠᠪᠤᠨ ᠮᠠᠬᠠᠪᠤᠳ

Japanese name
- Kanji: 五行
- Hiragana: ごぎょう
Transcriptions
- Romanization: Gogyō

Manchu name
- Manchu script: ᠰᡠᠨᠵᠠ ᡶᡝᡨᡝᠨ
- Möllendorff: sunja feten

Diagram of the interactions between the wuxing. The "generative" cycle is illustrated by grey arrows running clockwise on the outside of the circle, while the "destructive" or "conquering" cycle is represented by blue arrows inside the circle.

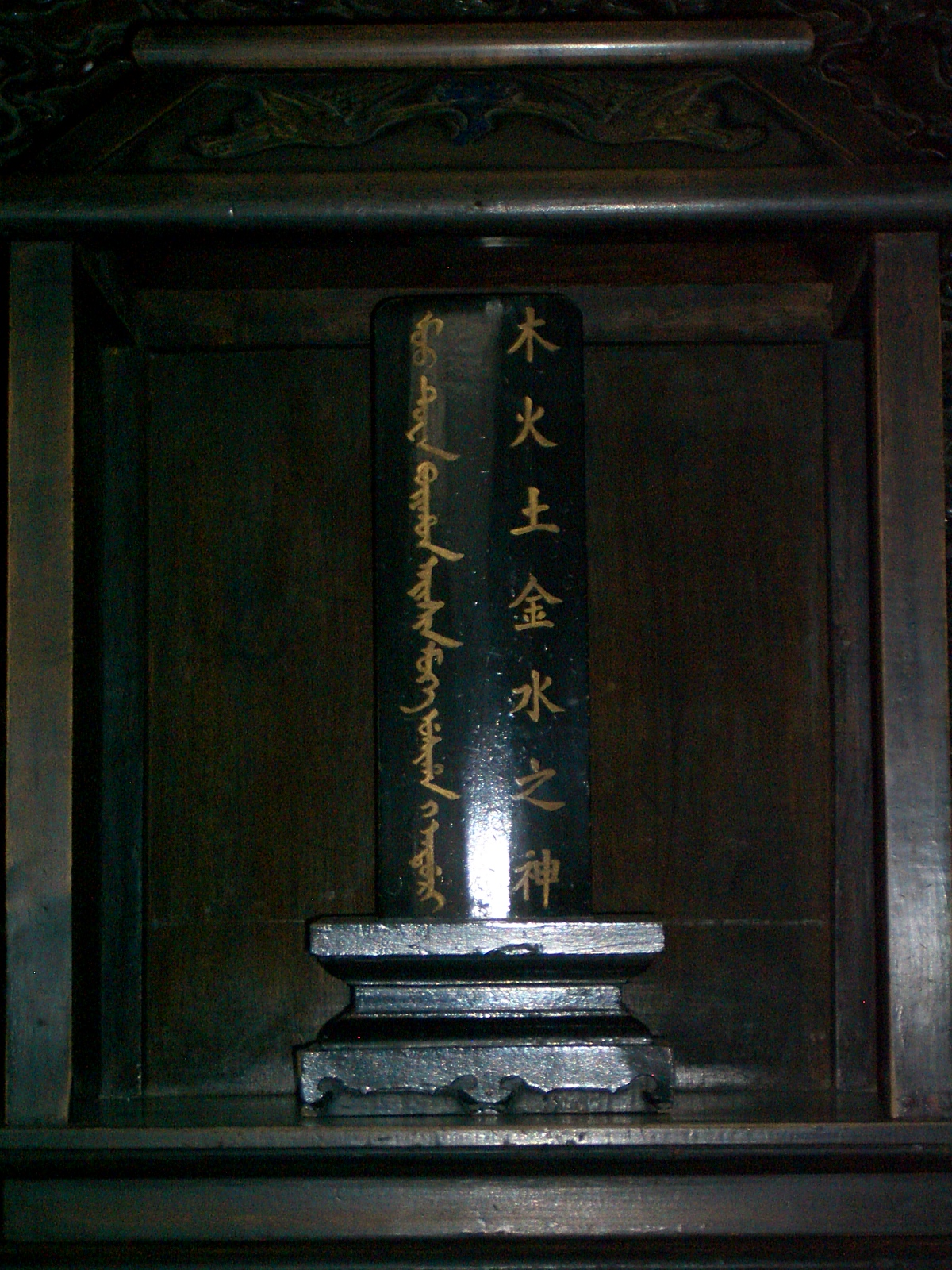
Tablet in the Temple of Heaven of Beijing, written in Chinese and Manchu, dedicated to the gods of the Five Movements. The Manchu word usiha, meaning "star", explains that this tablet is dedicated to the five planets, Jupiter, Mars, Saturn, Venus and Mercury, and the movements which they govern.

Wuxing (Chinese: 五行; pinyin: wǔxíng; Jyutping: Ng^{5} Hang^{4}), (Note: Japanese: gogyō (五行); Korean: ohaeng (오행); Vietnamese: ngũ hành (五行)) translated as Five Moving Ones, Five Circulations, Five Types of Energy, Five Elements, Five Transformations, Five Phases or Five Agents, is a fivefold conceptual scheme used in many traditional Chinese fields of study to explain a wide array of phenomena, including terrestrial and celestial relationships, influences and cycles that characterise the interactions and relationships within science, Traditional Chinese medicine, Confucianism, Taoism, social relationships and education within Chinese culture.

The Five Moving Ones are traditionally associated with the classical planets: Mars, Mercury, Jupiter, Venus, and Saturn. In ancient Chinese astronomy and astrology, which spread throughout East Asia, there was a reflection of the seven-day planetary order of Fire, Water, Wood, Metal, and Earth. (Note: This order of presentation is known as the "Day of the week" or "Twenty-Eight Mansions" sequence. In the order of "mutual generation" (相生; xiāngshēng), they are Wood, Fire, Earth, Metal, and Water. In the order of "mutual overacting" (相克; xiāngkè), they are Wood, Earth, Water, Fire, and Metal.) When in their "heavenly stems" generative cycle as represented in the below cycles section and depicted in the diagram above, they run consecutively clockwise (Wood, Fire, Earth, Metal and Water). When in their overacting destructive arrangement of Wood, Earth, Water, Fire and Metal, natural disasters, calamities, illnesses, and disease will ensue.

The wuxing system was in use before but was formulated in the second or first century BCE during the Han dynasty. It appears in many seemingly disparate fields of early Chinese thought, including music, Feng shui, alchemy, astrology, martial arts, military strategy, I Ching divination, religion and traditional medicine, serving as a metaphysics based on cosmic analogy.

== Etymology ==
Taijitu diagram featuring the wuxing in the center (from the Complete Classics Collection of Ancient China by Chen Menglei)

Wuxing originally referred to the five classical planets (from brightest to dimmest: Venus, Jupiter, Mercury, Mars, Saturn), which together with the Sun and the Moon, were conceived as creating the five forces of earthly life (including yang and yin). This is why the word is composed of Chinese characters meaning "five" (五; wǔ) and "moving" (行; xíng). "Moving" is shorthand for "planets", since the Chinese word for planets is translated as "moving stars" (行星; xíngxīng). Some of the Mawangdui Silk Texts (before 168 BCE) also connect the wuxing to the wude (五德; wǔdé), the Five Virtues and Five Emotions. Scholars believe that various predecessors of the concept of wuxing were merged into a single system of many interpretations during the Han dynasty.

Wuxing was first translated into English as "the Five Elements", drawing parallels with the Greek and Indian Vedic static, solid or formative arrangement of the four elements. This translation is still in common use among practitioners of Traditional Chinese medicine, such as in the name of Five Element acupuncture, Five Element Qigong and Japanese meridian therapy.However, this analogy could be misleading as the four elements are concerned with form, substance and quantity. In contrast, the post-heaven arrangement of the wuxing is "primarily concerned with process, change, and quality". For example, the wuxing element "Wood" is more accurately thought of as the "vital essence" and growth of trees rather than the physical innate substance wood. This led sinologist Nathan Sivin to propose the alternative translation "five phases" in 1987. But "phase" also fails to capture the full meaning of wuxing. In some contexts, the wuxing are indeed associated with physical substances. Historian of Chinese medicine Manfred Porkert proposed the term "Evolutive Phase". Perhaps the most widely accepted translation among modern scholars is the "five agents" or "five transformations".

== Cycles ==
In traditional doctrine, the five phases are connected in two cycles of interactions: a promoting or generative (生 shēng) cycle, also known as "mother-son"; and an overacting or destructive (克 kè) cycle, also known as "grandfather-grandson" (see diagram). Each of these cycles can be interpreted and analyzed in either a forward or a reverse direction. In addition to the aforementioned cycles there is also what is considered an "overacting" or excessively generating version of the destructive cycle.

=== Inter-promoting ===
The generative cycle (相生 xiāngshēng) is:

- Wood feeds Fire as fuel
- Fire produces Earth (ash, lava)
- Earth bears Metal (geological processes produce minerals)
- Metal collects, filters and purifies Water (water vapor condenses on metal, for example)
- Water nourishes Wood (water leads to growth of flowers, plants and other changes in nature)

=== Inter-regulating ===
The destructive cycle (相克 xiāngkè) is:

- Wood grasps (or stabilizes) Earth (roots of trees can prevent soil erosion)
- Earth contains (or directs) Water (dams or river banks)
- Water dampens (or regulates) Fire
- Fire melts (or refines or shapes) Metal
- Metal chops (or carves) Wood

=== Overacting ===
The excessive destructive cycle (相乘 xiāngchéng) is:

- Wood depletes Earth (depletion of nutrients in soil, over-farming, overcultivation)
- Earth obstructs Water (over-damming)
- Water extinguishes Fire
- Fire melts Metal (affecting its integrity)
- Metal makes Wood rigid to easily snap.

=== Weakening ===
The reverse generative cycle (相洩/相泄 xiāngxiè) is:

- Wood depletes Water
- Water rusts Metal
- Metal impoverishes Earth (erosion, destructive mining of minerals)
- Earth smothers Fire
- Fire burns Wood (forest fires)

=== Counteracting ===
A reverse or deficient destructive cycle (相侮 xiāngwǔ or 相耗 xiānghào) is:

- Wood dulls Metal
- Metal de-energizes Fire (conducting heat away)
- Fire evaporates Water
- Water muddies (or destabilizes) Earth
- Earth rots Wood (buried wood rots)

== Celestial stem ==
Movement	Wood	Fire	Earth	Metal	Water
Heavenly Stems	Jia 甲 Yi 乙	Bing 丙 Ding 丁	Wu 戊 Ji 己	Geng 庚 Xin 辛	Ren 壬 Gui 癸
Year ends with	4, 5	6, 7	8, 9	0, 1	2, 3

=== Ming nayin ===
In Ziwei divination, nayin (納音) further classifies the Five Elements into 30 ming (命), or life orders, based on the ganzhi. Similar to the astrology zodiac, the ming is used by fortune-tellers to analyse individual personality and destiny.

Order	Ganzhi	Ming	Order	Ganzhi	Ming	Element
1	Wood Rat 甲子	Sea metal 海中金	31	Wood Horse 甲午	Sand metal 沙中金	Metal
2	Wood Ox 乙丑	Sea metal 海中金	32	Wood Goat 乙未	Sand metal 沙中金	Metal
3	Fire Tiger 丙寅	Furnace fire 爐中火	33	Fire Monkey 丙申	Forest fire 山下火	Fire
4	Fire Rabbit 丁卯	Furnace fire 爐中火	34	Fire Rooster 丁酉	Forest fire 山下火	Fire
5	Earth Dragon 戊辰	Forest wood 大林木	35	Earth Dog 戊戌	Meadow wood 平地木	Wood
6	Earth Snake 己巳	Forest wood 大林木	36	Earth Pig 己亥	Meadow wood 平地木	Wood
7	Metal Horse 庚午	Road earth 路旁土	37	Metal Rat 庚子	Adobe earth 壁上土	Earth
8	Metal Goat 辛未	Road earth 路旁土	38	Metal Ox 辛丑	Adobe earth 壁上土	Earth
9	Water Monkey 壬申	Sword metal 劍鋒金	39	Water Tiger 壬寅	Foil metal 金箔金	Metal
10	Water Rooster 癸酉	Sword metal 劍鋒金	40	Water Rabbit 癸卯	Foil metal 金箔金	Metal
11	Wood Dog 甲戌	Volcanic fire 山頭火	41	Wood Dragon 甲辰	Lamp fire 覆燈火	Fire
12	Wood Pig 乙亥	Volcanic fire 山頭火	42	Wood Snake 乙巳	Lamp fire 覆燈火	Fire
13	Fire Rat 丙子	Creek water 澗下水	43	Fire Horse 丙午	Sky water 天河水	Water
14	Fire Ox 丁丑	Creek water 澗下水	44	Fire Goat 丁未	Sky water 天河水	Water
15	Earth Tiger 戊寅	Fortress earth 城頭土	45	Earth Monkey 戊申	Stage station earth 大驛土	Earth
16	Earth Rabbit 己卯	Fortress earth 城頭土	46	Earth Rooster 己酉	Stage station earth 大驛土	Earth
17	Metal Dragon 庚辰	Pewter metal 白镴金	47	Metal Dog 庚戌	Jewellery metal 釵釧金	Metal
18	Metal Snake 辛巳	Pewter metal 白镴金	48	Metal Pig 辛亥	Jewellery metal 釵釧金	Metal
19	Water Horse 壬午	Willow wood 楊柳木	49	Water Rat 壬子	Mulberry wood 桑柘木	Wood
20	Water Goat 癸未	Willow wood 楊柳木	50	Water Ox 癸丑	Mulberry wood 桑柘木	Wood
21	Wood Monkey 甲申	Stream water 泉中水	51	Wood Tiger 甲寅	Rapids water 大溪水	Water
22	Wood Rooster 乙酉	Stream water 泉中水	52	Wood Rabbit 乙卯	Rapids water 大溪水	Water
23	Fire Dog 丙戌	Roof tiles earth 屋上土	53	Fire Dragon 丙辰	Desert earth 沙中土	Earth
24	Fire Pig 丁亥	Roof tiles earth 屋上土	54	Fire Snake 丁巳	Desert earth 沙中土	Earth
25	Earth Rat 戊子	Lightning fire 霹靂火	55	Earth Horse 戊午	Sun fire 天上火	Fire
26	Earth Ox 己丑	Lightning fire 霹靂火	56	Earth Goat 己未	Sun fire 天上火	Fire
27	Metal Tiger 庚寅	Conifer wood 松柏木	57	Metal Monkey 庚申	Pomegranate wood 石榴木	Wood
28	Metal Rabbit 辛卯	Conifer wood 松柏木	58	Metal Rooster 辛酉	Pomegranate wood 石榴木	Wood
29	Water Dragon 壬辰	River water 長流水	59	Water Dog 壬戌	Ocean water 大海水	Water
30	Water Snake 癸巳	River water 長流水	60	Water Pig 癸亥	Ocean water 大海水	Water

== Applications ==
The wuxing schema is applied to explain phenomena in various fields.

=== Phases of the year ===
The five phases are around 73 days each and are usually used to describe the transformations of nature rather than their formative states.

- Wood/Spring: a period of growth, the expansion of which generates vitality and movement; associated with wind.
- Fire/Summer: a period of fruition and ripening flowering; associated with heat.
- Earth can be seen as a period of stability and stillness transitioning between the other phases or seasons, or, when relating to transformative seasonal periods, it can be seen as late summer. This period is associated with centralisation, leveling and dampness.
- Metal/Autumn: a period of moving inward. It is associated with collection, harvesting, transmuting, contracting, loss and dryness.
- Water/Winter: a period of reclusiveness, stillness, consolidation and coolness.

=== Cosmology and feng shui ===
Detailed illustration of the cycle

The art of feng shui (Chinese geomancy) is based on wuxing, with the structure of the cosmos mirroring the five phases, as well as bagua (the eight trigrams). Each phase has a complex network of associations with different aspects of nature (see table): colors, seasons and shapes all interact according to the cycles.

An interaction or energy flow can be expansive, destructive, or exhaustive, depending on the cycle it belongs to. By understanding these energy flows, a feng shui practitioner attempts to rearrange energy to benefit the client. (Note: This order of presentation is known as the "Guoyu" or "Shiming" sequence, which is common in feng shui.)

Movement	Metal		Wood		Water	Fire	Earth	
Trigram hanzi	乾	兌	震	巽	坎	離	艮	坤
Trigram pinyin	qián	duì	zhèn	xùn	kǎn	lí	gèn	kūn
Trigrams	☰	☱	☳	☴	☵	☲	☶	☷
I Ching	Heaven	Lake	Thunder	Wind	Water	Fire	Mountain	Field
Planet (Celestial Body)	Venus		Jupiter		Mercury	Mars	Saturn	
Elementary Color	White		Blue (Cyan)		Black	Red	Yellow	
Intermediary Color	Aquamarine		Green		Purple	Orange	Grey	
Day	Friday		Thursday		Wednesday	Tuesday	Saturday	
Season	Autumn		Spring		Winter	Summer	Intermediate	
Cardinal direction	West		East		North	South	Center	

=== Dynastic transitions ===
According to the Warring States period political philosopher Zou Yan (c. 305–240 BCE), each of the five elements possesses a personified virtue (德; dé), which indicates the foreordained destiny (運; yùn) of a dynasty; hence, the cyclic succession of the elements also indicates dynastic transitions. Zou Yan claims that the Mandate of Heaven sanctions the legitimacy of a dynasty by sending self-manifesting auspicious signs in ritual colors (white, blue, black, red, and yellow) that match the element of the new dynasty (Metal, Wood, Water, Fire, and Earth). From the Qin dynasty onward, most Chinese dynasties invoked the theory of Wude Zhongshi Shuo (五德終始說) known as the Five Virtues dynastic succession theory that legitimized their reign.

=== Chinese medicine ===
Chinese Five Elements Diurnal Cycle - 24 hour cycle of energy in the human body; waxing and waning of energy in each organ; during the time of the living breath, and the time of the dead breath.

The interdependence of zangfu networks in the body was said to be a circle of five things, and so mapped by the ancient Chinese doctors onto categories of syndromes and patterns called the five phases.

In order to explain the integrity and complexity of the human body, Traditional Chinese Medicine practitioners use the Five Elements theory to classify the endogenous influences on organs, physiological activities, pathological reactions, and environmental (exogenous) influences. This diagnostic capacity is extensively used in traditional five-phase, stems and branches acupuncture today, as opposed to the modern use of Confucian-styled eight principles based Traditional Chinese medicine.

Movement	Wood	Fire	Earth	Metal	Water
Planet	Jupiter	Mars	Saturn	Venus	Mercury
Mental Quality	idealism, spontaneity, curiosity	passion, intensity	agreeableness, honesty	intuition, rationality, mind	erudition, resourcefulness, wit
Emotion	anger, motivation	frenzy, joy	anxiety, planning	grief, compassion	fear, caution
Virtue	Benevolence	Propriety	Fidelity	Righteousness	Wisdom
Zang (yin organs)	liver	heart/pericardium	spleen/pancreas	lung	kidney
Fu (yang organs)	Gallbladder (Chinese medicine)	small intestine/San Jiao	stomach	large intestine	urinary bladder
Sensory Organ	eyes	tongue	mouth	nose	ears
Body Part	tendons	vessels	muscles	skin	bones
Body Fluid	tears	sweat	saliva	mucus	urine
Finger	ring finger	middle finger	thumb	index finger	pinky finger
Sense	sight	taste	touch	smell	hearing
Taste	sour	bitter	sweet	pungent, umami	salty
Smell	rancid	scorched	fragrant	rotten	putrid
Life	early childhood	youth	adulthood	senior age	old age, conception
Covering	scaly	feathered	naked human	furred	shelled
Hour	3–9	9–15	change	15–21	21–3
Year	Spring Equinox	Summer Solstice	Summer Final	Fall Equinox	Winter Solstice
360°	45–135°	135–225°	Change	225–315°	315–45°

=== Music ===
The Huainanzi and the Yueling chapter (月令; Yuèlìng) of the Book of Rites make the following correlations:

Movement	Wood	Fire	Earth	Metal	Water
Elementary Color	Blue (Cyan)	Red	Yellow	White	Black
Intermediary Color	Green	Orange	Grey	Aquamarine	Purple
Arctic Direction	east	south	center	west	north
Basic Pentatonic Scale pitch	角	徵	宮	商	羽
Basic Pentatonic Scale pitch pinyin	jué	zhǐ	gōng	shāng	yǔ
solfege	mi or E	sol or G	do or C	re or D	la or A

- Qing (Cyan) is a Chinese color word used for both green and blue. Modern Mandarin has separate words for each, but like many other languages, older forms of Chinese did not distinguish between green and blue.
- In most modern music, various five-note or seven-note scales (e.g., the major scale) are defined by selecting five or seven frequencies from the set of twelve semitones in the Equal tempered tuning. The Chinese shi'er lü system of tuning is closest to the ancient Greek tuning of Pythagoras.

=== Martial arts ===
With wuxing as an influential philosophical concept, several Chinese martial arts and a few other East Asian styles incorporate five-phase concepts into their systems.

Tai chi trains and focuses on five basic qualities as part of its overarching strategy.

The Five Steps (五步; wǔ bù) are:

- Lǎo Jìnbù (老進步) – always step forward
- Juébù Tuìbù (絕不退步) – never step backward
- Yòupàn (右盼) – watch right
- Zuǒgù (左顧) – beware left
- Zhōngdìng (中定) – center pole, point, pivot neutral posture, maintain balance, maintain equilibrium.

These five steps are not mutable states in tai chi.

Xingyi Quan uses the five elements metaphorically to represent five distinct energies. Energy work is subtle, so one normally starts out by learning five basic techniques with complementary footwork to teach the basic concepts behind the energies. Ideally, one can use any technique with any kind of energy, but there are different levels of skill one must go through.

In Xingyi Quan, the realization of the five energies has three basic levels: obvious power, subtle power, and mysterious power.

Movement	Fist	Chinese	Pinyin	Direction	Shape	Subtle Action	Energy	Feeling
Metal	Splitting	劈	Pī	Downward	Fist or palm chopping forward, hand pulling down and back, spine rolling downward	dragging down	condensing power	Dropping (jerking down)
Water	Drilling	鑽 / 钻	Zuān	Upward	Fist drilling upward like water under pressure, hand down and back	spiraling	relaxing power	Shocking (jerking up and down simultaneously)
Wood	Crushing	崩	Bēng	Forward	Fist shooting straight forward	wedging	linear power	Penetrating (expanding through)
Fire	Pounding	炮	Pào	Backward	Fist being propelled forward by body flinging open	flinging	reciprocal power	Launching (uprooting and countering)
Earth	Crossing	橫 / 横	Héng	Horizontal	Fist crossing horizontally and turning over to plough through	turning	torque power	Colliding (turning into a strike, falling onto a strike)

The Five Animals in Shaolin martial arts are an extension of the Wuxing theory as their qualities are the embodiment and representation of the energetic qualities of the five phases in the animal kingdom. They are the following:

- Tiger - Fire (fierce and powerful)
- Monkey - Metal (hunched over)
- Snake - Water (flexible)
- Crane - Wood (evasive)
- Mantis - Earth (steady and rooted)

Wuxing Heqidao, (Gogyo Aikido 五行合气道) is a life art with roots in Confucian, Taoist and Buddhist theory. It centers around applied peace and health studies rather than defence or physical action. It emphasizes the unification of mind, body and environment using the physiological theory of yin and yang as well as five-element Traditional Chinese medicine. Its movements, exercises, and teachings cultivate, direct, and harmonise a person's qi (life energy).

== In Japan ==
Mon of Abe no Seimei

The Japanese term is gogyo (Japanese: 五行, Romanized: gogyō). During the 5th and 6th centuries (Kofun period), Japan adopted various philosophical disciplines such as Taoism, Chinese Buddhism, and Confucianism through monks and physicians from China, helping to evolve the Onmyōdō system. In contrast, the theory of Godai is a form-based philosophy introduced to Japan from India and Tibetan Buddhism. Both theories have been extensively practiced in the Japanese arts including acupuncture and traditional Kampo medicine.

== See also ==
- Acupuncture
- Chinese Zodiac
- Classical element
- Color in Chinese culture
- Five Races Under One Union
- Flying Star Feng Shui
- Humorism
- Qi
- Wude Zhongshi Shuo
- Wufang Shangdi
- Wuxing painting
- Zangfu
- Yin and yang
