= Xingming guizhi =

1615 Chinese text about Inner Alchemy

- Xingming shuangxiu wanshen guizhi half-title page
- Author: Unknown
- Original title: 性命雙修萬神圭旨
- Language: Chinese
- Genre: Neidan, Daoism, Buddhism
- Published: 1615
- Publication place: Ming dynasty (China)
- Original text: 性命雙修萬神圭旨 at Chinese Wikisource

Xingming guizhi

Chinese name
- Chinese: 性命圭旨
Transcriptions
Standard Mandarin
- Hanyu Pinyin: Xìngmìng guīzhǐ
- Wade–Giles: Hsing^{4}ming^{4} kui^{1}-chih^{3}
Yue: Cantonese
- Yale Romanization: Singmihng gwāiji
- Jyutping: Sing^{3}ming^{6} gwai^{1}zi^{2}

Korean name
- Hangul: 성명규지
- Hanja: 性命圭旨
Transcriptions
- Revised Romanization: Seongmyeong gyuji

Japanese name
- Kanji: 性命圭旨
- Kana: せいめいけいし
Transcriptions
- Romanization: Seimei keishi

The Xingming guizhi (Chinese: 性命圭旨; trans. "Principles of Inner Nature and Vital Force") is a comprehensive Ming dynasty (1368–1644) text on neidan ("internal alchemy") self-cultivation techniques, which syncretistically quotes sources from the Three teachings of Daoism, Confucianism, and Buddhism and is richly illustrated with over fifty illustrations that later texts widely copied. The classic Xingming guizhi has been republished for over four centuries, from its first woodblock edition in 1615 to digital versions in the present.

== Title ==
Xingming shuangxiu wanshen guizhi (性命雙修萬神圭旨; "Principles of the Joint Cultivation of Inner Nature and Vital Force and of the Ten Thousand Spiritual Forces") is the full title of the Xingming guizhi. Shuangxiu (雙修) denotes the "joint cultivation" of xing ("inner nature") and ming ("vital force"), which is the objective of Neidan schools. Although the Xingming guizhi promulgates the shuangxiu (雙修; "joint cultivation") of xing and ming, it does not attach much importance to physiological practices and emphasizes the spiritual aspects of inner transformation.

Both titles use the common Chinese word xìngmìng (性命; "life"), and the rare, if not nonce, word guizhi (圭旨).

=== Xingming ===
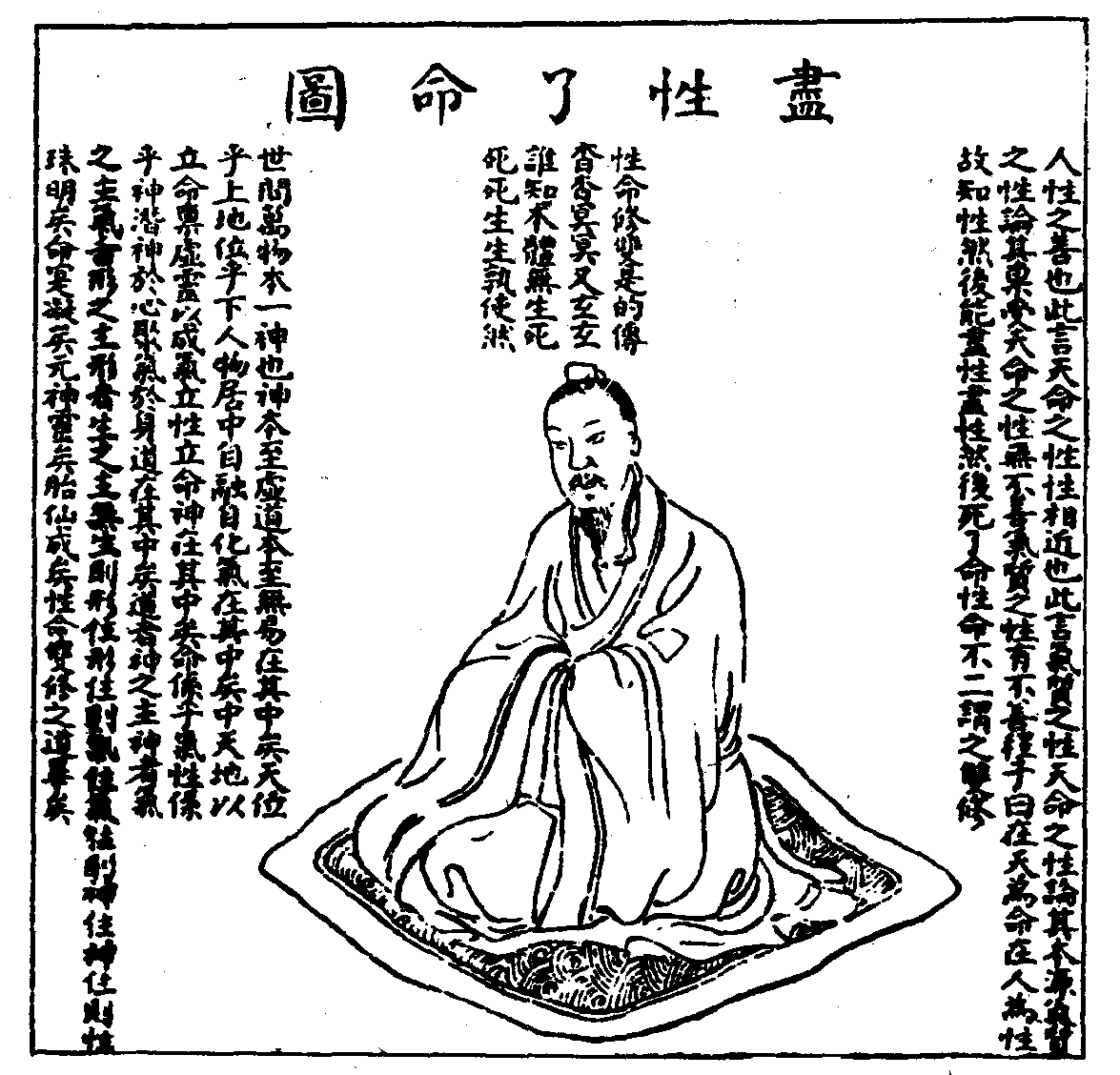
Exhausting the Xing and Living Out the Ming (盡性了命圖)

Unlike guizhi, xingming is found in Chinese dictionaries. For instance, the unabridged monolingual Hanyu Da Cidian (Comprehensive Chinese Word Dictionary), which is lexicographically comparable to the Oxford English Dictionary, defines three meanings for xingming:

1. 中国古代哲学范畴。指万物的天赋和禀受。 [Ancient Chinese philosophical category. It refers to the natural talents and endowments of all living things.]
2. 生命。 [Life.]
3. 本性。 [Natural character; inherent quality; original nature.].

The English translation equivalents of the title's xing and ming are informative.

Xìng (性):

1. Inborn; one's inborn nature, one's fundamental being.
2. Native character, predisposition; one's endowment at birth; particular inherent quality; innate; inborn destiny.

Mìng (命):

1. Call on one to do X; give orders to; bid; direct. Command, ordain; decree; injunction, mandate. Exhortation; advice, counsel.
2. To name, call (as). Confer a title on, bestow a dignity.
3. Heaven-ordained duration of life, life-span ... Heaven-ordained circumstances of life, fate, destiny; "calling," vocation, mission.

As its title suggests, the Xingming guizhi is

principally concerned with the "endowment" (xing, often translated as "nature") and "vitality" (ming, often translated as "life" or "life-span") of human life. Essentially, xing and ming together compose the most fundamental energy that animates the human body, and the purpose of this treatise is to return the secondary energies of the body to the primordial purity of this primary energy.

=== Guizhi ===
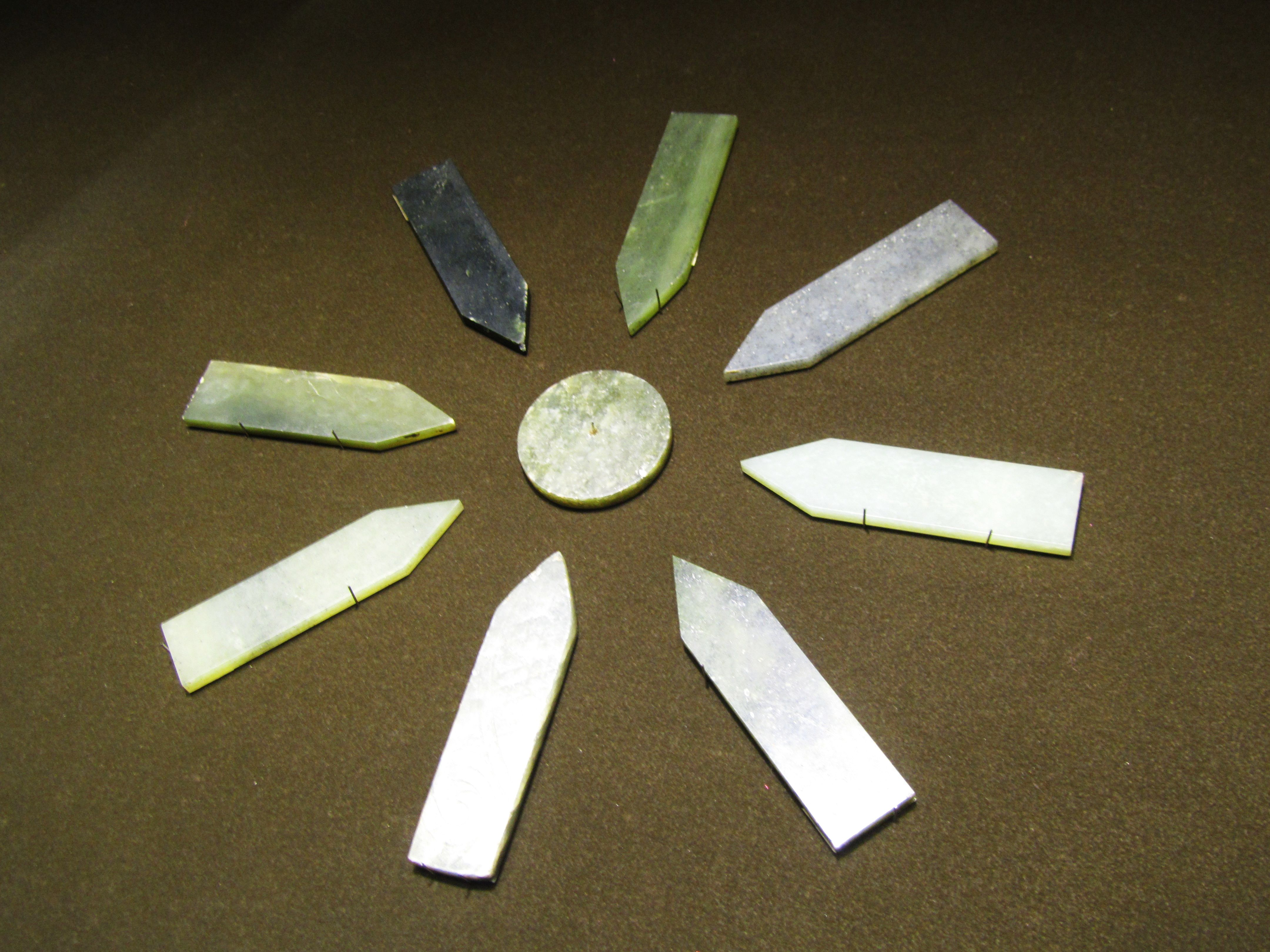
Jade gui (圭)) from the Western Han dynasty (202 BCE – 9 CE)

Compare the translation equivalents of gui and zhi:

Guī (圭)

1. Jade tablet or scepter, square-bottomed and round or pointed at the top, given by ruler in early times to trusted ministers or vassals; ...

The Qing scholar You Tong's preface to the 1670 Xingming guizhi says this gui (圭) character, composed of tu (土; "earth; soil; land") doubled, is a pun for the Inner Alchemical huangting (黃庭; "Yellow Court"), see the Yellow Court Classic.

Zhǐ (旨):

1. Purport, aim; meaning, significance. Opinion, slant, viewpoint.
2. [Medieval Chinese] Directive, imperial rescript. ...

Most Chinese characters are classified as phono-semantic compound characters, which combine a radical that suggests word meaning and a phonetic that roughly indicates pronunciation. The first meanings of gui and zhi above are illustrative. Guī (珪) (written with the "jade" radical ⺩ and 圭; guī phonetic), is an old variant character for 圭; guī; "jade tablet or scepter". Zhǐ (指; "finger; point (out), indicate; purport, aim; meaning, significance", with the "hand" radical 扌 and 旨; zhǐ phonetic) is an interchangeable variant character for zhǐ (旨).

=== English ===
Scholars have translated the Chinese title Xingming guizhi in many ways:

- A Pointer to the Meaning of Human Nature and the Life-Span
- Directions for Endowment and Vitality
- Directions to the Balanced Cultivation of Inner Nature and Vital Energy
- Principles of Balanced Cultivation of Inner Nature and Vital Force
- Principles of the Innate Disposition and the Lifespan
- Authoritative Decrees on Innate Nature and Life-destiny
- Superior Pointers to Inner Nature and Destiny
- Directions on the Unity of Xing and Ming
- Jade Guide to the Mind-nature and Life
- Talismanic Directives to the Cultivation of Nature and Vitality
- Principles of the Tablets on the Innate Nature and the Vital Force
- Pointers on Spiritual Nature and Bodily Life

These translations generally follow accepted philosophical meanings of xing (e.g., inner, human, spiritual nature) and ming (life, lifespan, vitality); while diverging on how to render gui (jade, talismanic, authoritative, superior, or untranslated) and zhi (pointers [指], decrees, directions, principles). Kohn and Darga translate the full title Xingming shuangxiu wanshen guizhi.

== Textual history ==
The origins of the Xingming guizhi are obscure, but since it quotes several Ming dynasty writers, such as Luo Hongxian (1504–1564), it can be dated to the late 16th century.

After its first edition in 1615, the Xingming guizhi was frequently republished; notably 1622 during the Ming dynasty, 1669 and 1670 during the Qing dynasty (1644–1912), in Ding Fubao's 1922 Daozang jinghua lu (道藏精華錄; "Record of the Essential Splendors of the Daoist Canon"), and in the Beijing White Cloud Temple's 1989 edition. The text includes four prefaces, written by She Yongning (佘永寧, fl. 16th-17th century, dated 1615), Zou Yuanbiao (鄒元標 1551–1624, estimated 1622), You Tong (尤侗, 1618–1704, dated 1669), and Li Pu (李樸, ?- 1670, dated 1670).

The book's author remains unknown. These four early Xingming guizhi prefaces all say the text was written down by master Yin Zhenren's (尹真人; "Perfected Yin") gaodi: either literally (高弟; "high-level disciple; senior disciple") or the disciple's proper name Gao Di (高弟 or 高第; compare other Gao Dis). The identities of both this master and his disciple are ambiguous.

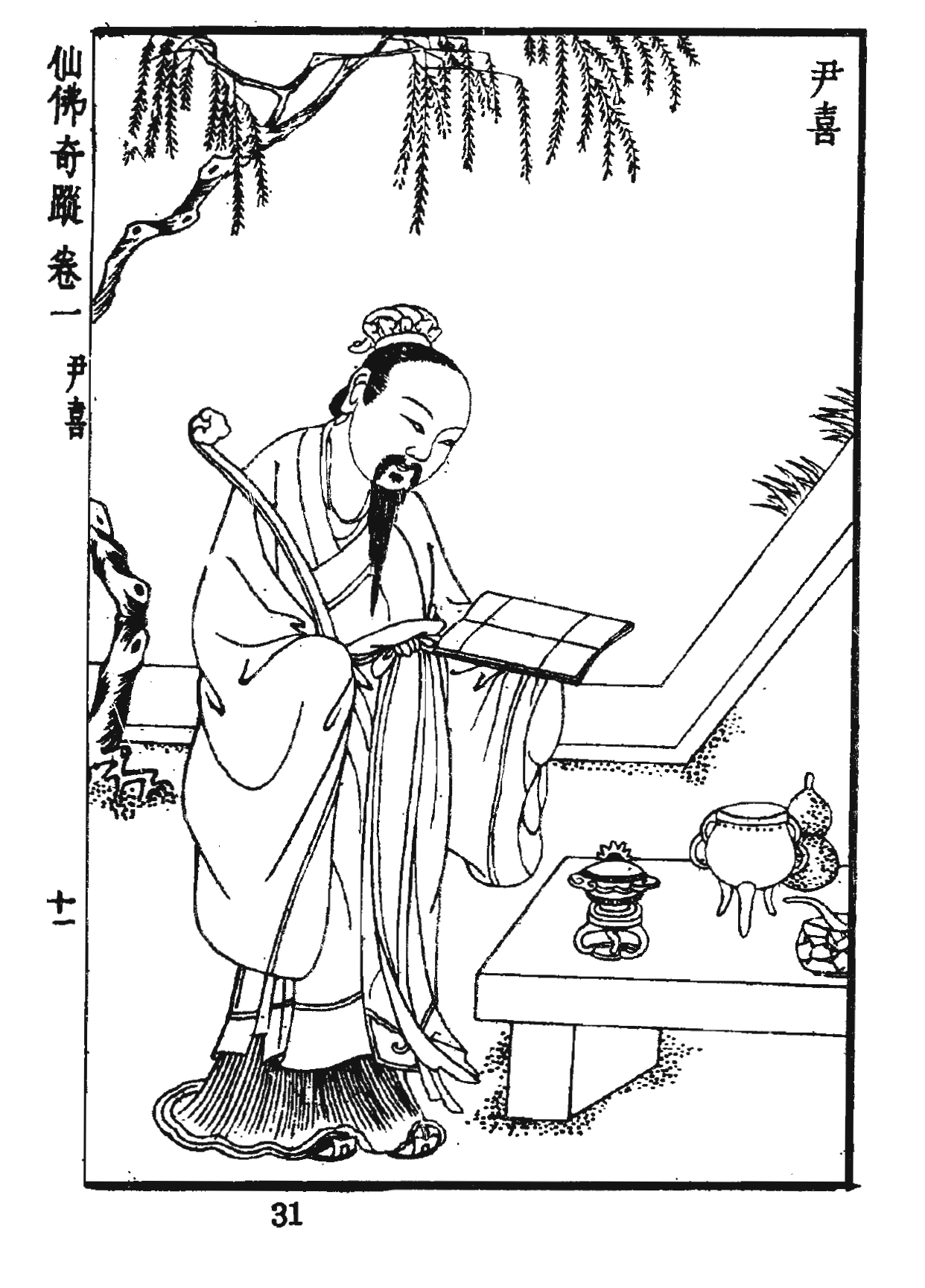
A portrait of Yinxi, Guardian of the Pass

The name Yin Zhenren (尹真人; "Perfected [Master] Yin" combines the Chinese surname Yin with the standard Daoist Zhenren ("Perfected Person") honorific term for a transcendent.

One authorial hypothesis is that Yin Zhenren conceivably dictated the Xinging guizhi through planchette writing or spirit writing. The Daozang Daoist Canon contains several texts supposedly produced from spirit-writing. Some examples are the Daoji lingxian ji (道迹靈仙記; "Record of the Traces of the Dao Left by Numinous Spirits and Immortals"), the Minghe yuyin (鳴鶴餘音; "Echoes of Cranes' Songs"), and the Xuxian hanzao (徐仙翰藻; "Literary Masterpieces of the Xu Immortals"). If the Xinging guizhi was produced through spirit writing, two possible Daoist masters surnamed Yin are Yinxi (尹喜), a legendary gatekeeper who persuaded Laozi to write the Daodejing before leaving China to travel West, and Yin Zhiping (尹志平, 1169–1251), the second patriarch of Quanzhen School Daoism.

Besides the Xingming guizhi, another Neidan text retrospectively attributed to Yin Zhenren or Yin Pengtou (尹蓬頭; "Disheveled Yin" is the 廖陽殿問答編; Liaoyang Dian Wenda Bian; "Questions and Answers of the [Eastern Cloister of the] Liaoyang Hall". Min Yide (閔一得) edited it around 1830 from a manuscript preserved in the Qingyang Daoist Temple in Chengdu.

Gaodi's lexical components are gao (高; "high; tall; eminent; surname"), di (弟; "younger brother; junior; [dizi (弟子)] disciple"), and di (第; "indicator of ordinal numerals; sequence, order; rank, grade"). Gaodi (高弟; "brilliant disciple; high-level student") and gaodi (高第; "high-ranking [especially in imperial civil-service examinations]") were sometimes used interchangeably.

She Yongming's first edition 1615 preface explicitly refers to (尹真人高弟弟子; "Yin Zhenren's disciple Gao Di")—using the name Di (弟) and dizi (弟子; "disciple"). Both You Tong's 1669 (尹真人高弟) and Li Pu's 1670 (尹真人之高弟) descriptions can alternatively be read as "high disciple" or as "Gao Di". Zuo Yuanbiao's 1622 forward (尹真人高第) writes Gao's given name as 第 instead of 弟. Needham and Lu translate Gao Di (高第) as a proper name.

One scholar tentatively identifies the Xingming guizhi disciple Gao Di with a Ming dynasty scholar. The 1739 History of Ming (juan 257) records that Gao Di (高第) received a jinshi degree in 1589 and opposed the eunuch dictator Wei Zhongxian.

== Contents ==
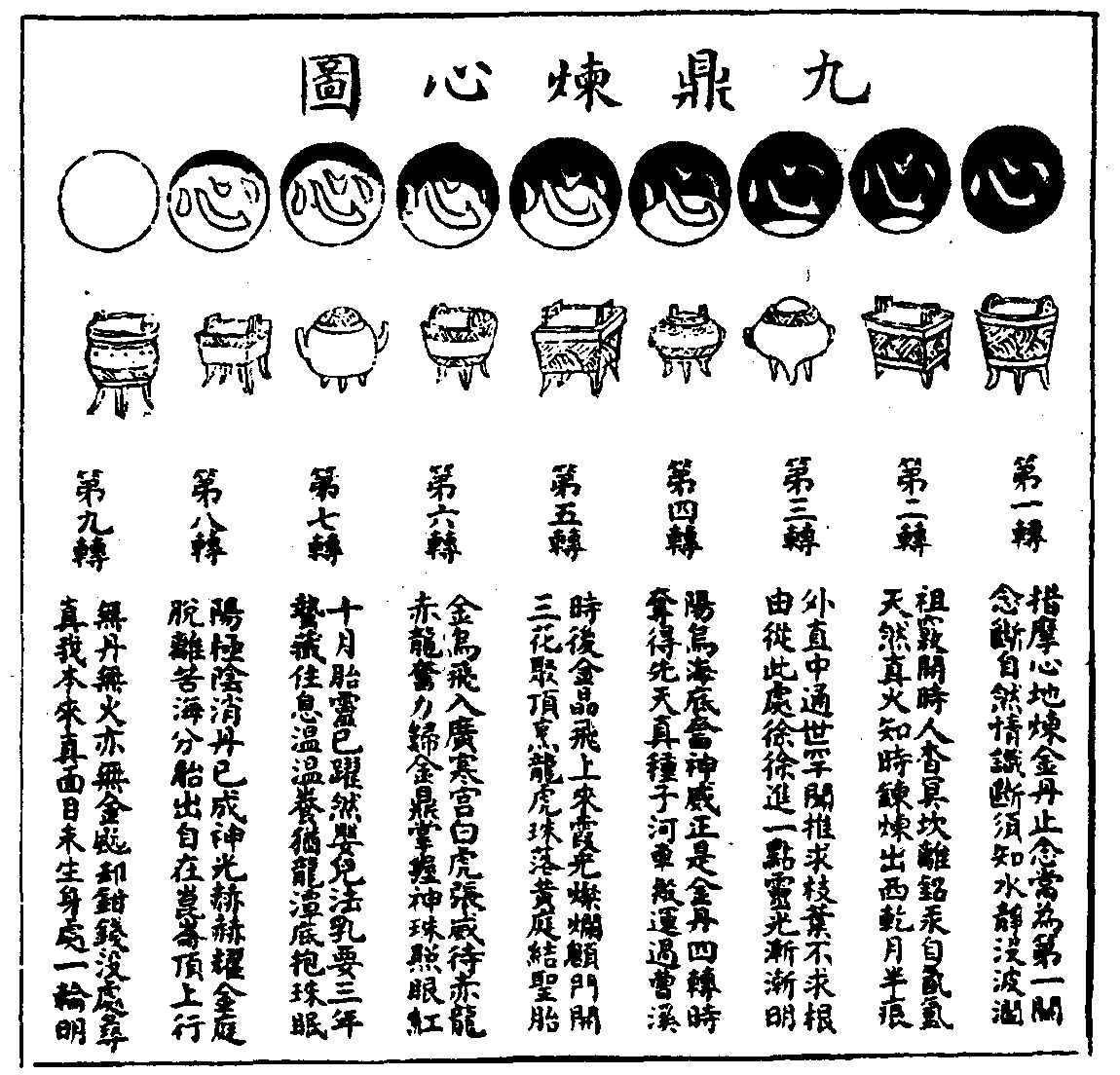
Nine Cauldrons Refine the Mind 九鼎煉心圖

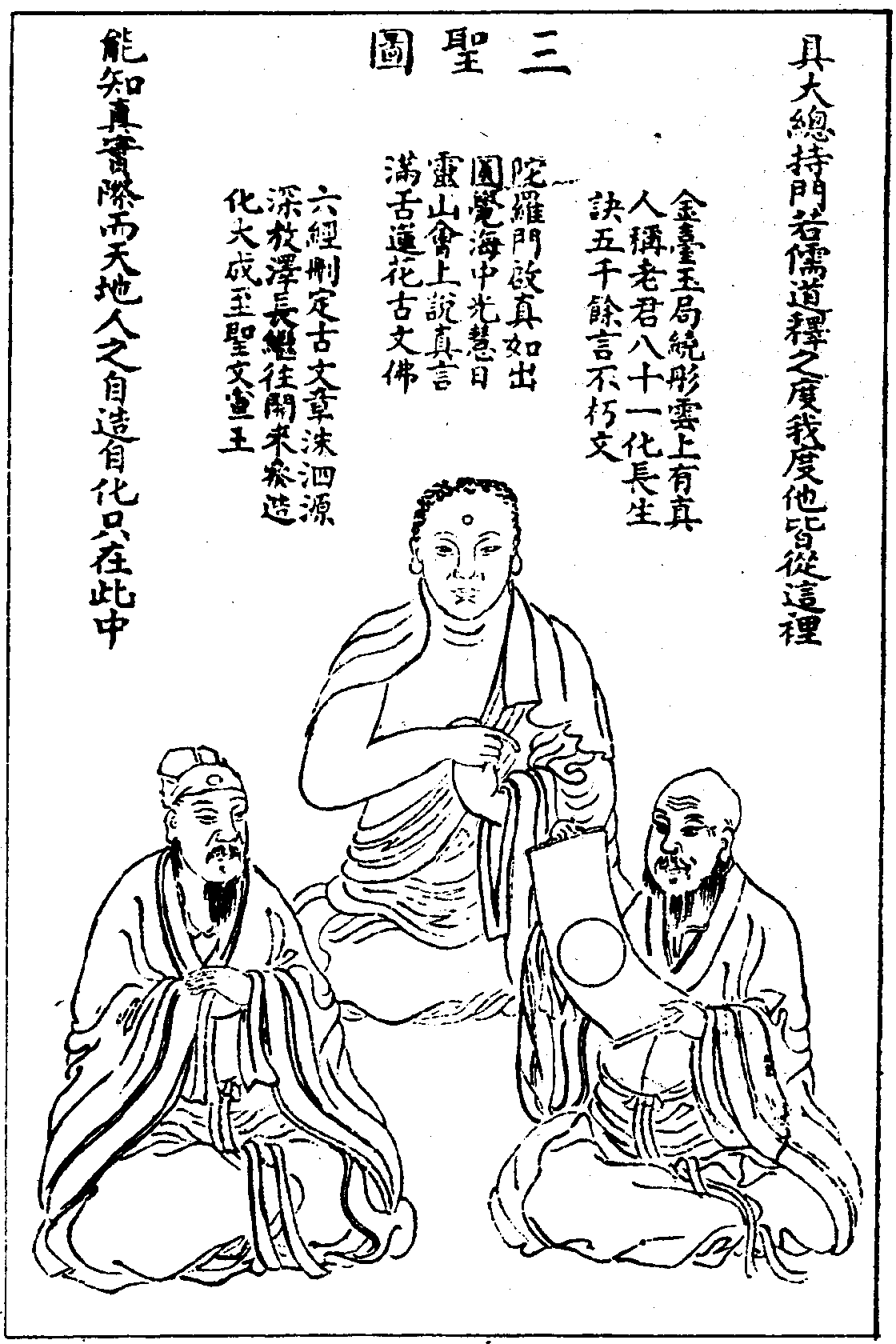
Three Sages (Confucius, Buddha, Laozi) 三聖圖

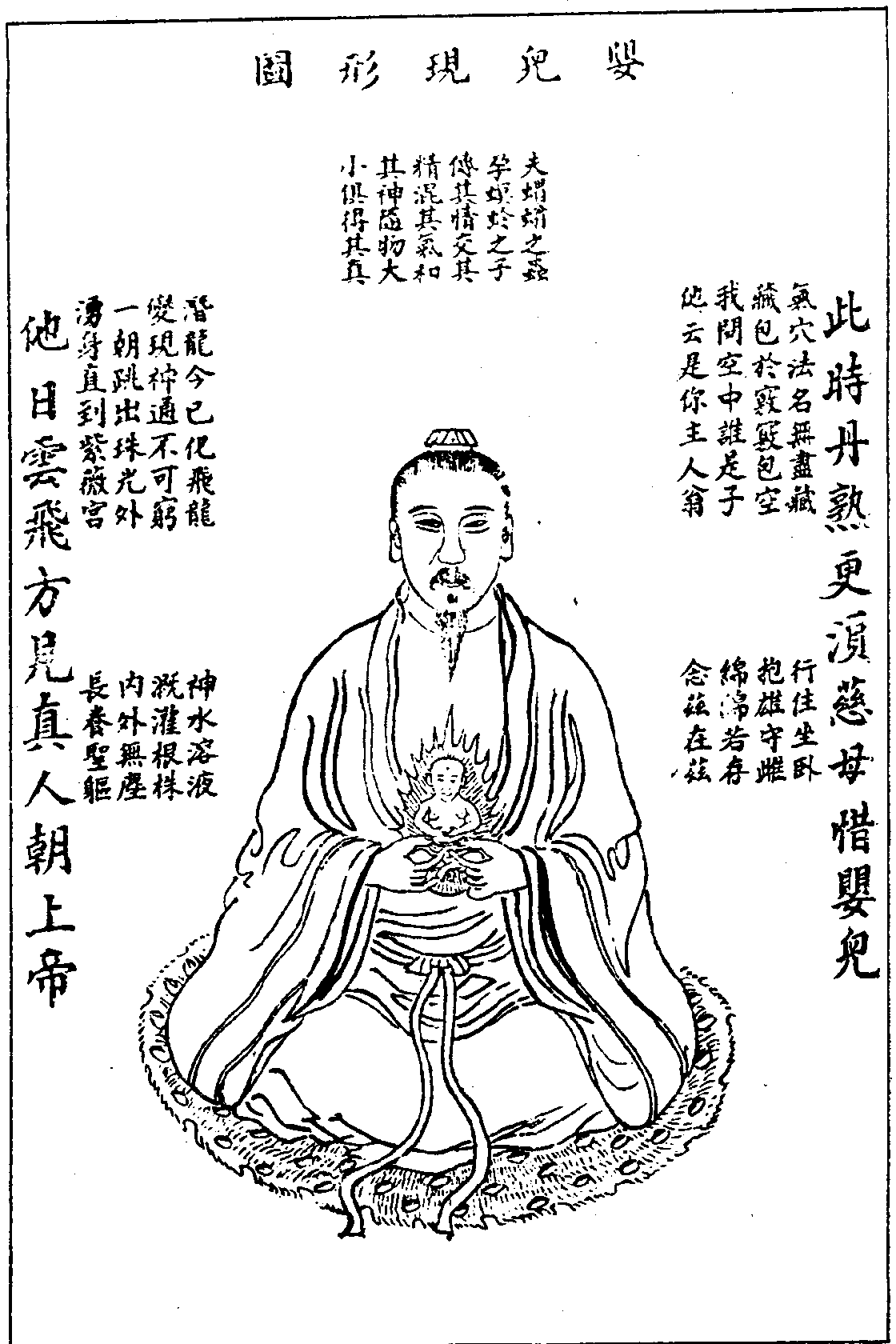
Ying'er xianxing (嬰兒現形), Revealing the Sacred Embryo)

The syncretistic Xingming guizhi is notable for comprehensive explanations, numerous woodcut illustrations, and explicit depictions of the nine stages of transformation. The wide-ranging Xingming guizhi is praised by the historians of Chinese science Joseph Needham and Lu Gwei-djen as, "a treatise of substantial size which might be regarded as the Summa of physiological alchemy [neidan]."

The Xingming guizhi text is divided into four ji (集; "collections of writings; books"): Yuan (元; "primary"), Heng (亨; "go smoothly"), Li (利; "benefit") and Zhen (貞; "loyal"), which is a Classical Chinese allusion to the first sentence of the Yijing commentary on Hexagram 1 Qian (乾; "force; creative"): "The Creative works sublime success, furthering through perseverance" [乾元亨利貞]. These four books present an overview of basic neidan principles.

Book 1 has twenty-three shuo (說; "explanations; discourses; narrations") that outline the foundations of Internal Alchemy. Books 2-4 give diverse koujue (口訣; "secret oral instructions") that explain neidan practices in more detail; each book contains three main chapters, organized in correspondence with the Quanzhen jiujie xuangong (九節玄功; "Mysterious Practice in Nine Stages") of internal alchemical transformation. All four books contain tu (圖; "illustrations; diagrams; charts") accompanied by short texts, frequently in the form of rhymed poems. The textual organization "outlines the adept's progress in four clear parts." Book 1 begins with defining basic concepts and clarifying terms; Book 2, called "nourishing the original source," deals with cultivating and strengthening one's physical energies; Book 3 establishes an active relationship between the physical and the heavenly, described as the "union of [the trigrams] qian (☰) and kun (☰)"; Book 4 describes liberation from the world, when the shengtai Sacred Embryo develops and grows, "goes beyond all, and merges with emptiness".

The Xingming guizhi quotes from Confucian, Lao-Zhuang, Daoist, and Buddhist sources.

One of the main concerns of the Xingming guizhi is to lead the adept through the multitude of alchemical methods and writings to the core of the true path of neidan. This core is to be sought at the basis of all phenomena and is proof of the undivided unity and the unchanging nature of the Dao. The author approaches this core from a variety of perspectives, employing a wealth of concepts but always returning to the central theme. He does not give any practical instructions for practicing inner alchemy, however; in fact, he dissociates himself from specific exercises, as these belong to the phenomenal domain from which he tries to lead away his readers.

In the Quanzhen lineages the Xingming guizhi is usually classified as belonging to the Beizong (北宗; "Northern Lineage") or the Zhongpai (中派; "Central Branch") of Ming and Qing neidan. Its ideas are mainly based on Zhang Boduan's (張伯端, 987?-1082) Wuzhen pian (Folios on Awakening to Reality / Perfection) and Li Daochun's (李道純, fl. 1288–1292) Zhonghe ji (中和集; "The Book of Balance and Harmony"), and are also closely related to other Quanzhen School neidan texts.

Despite the Xingming guizhi's detailed coverage of Daoist Internal Alchemy, such as a "wonderful list of the chief varieties of the 'three thousand six hundred' techniques [pangmen (旁門; 'side door'; "improper means")]" practiced by men and women neidan adepts, many Western sinologists have misconstrued it. John Dudgeon (1895) mistook the text for a manual of gymnastics, while Richard Wilhelm and Carl Jung (1931) used it "iconographically without much understanding". Wilhelm and Jung's The Secret of the Golden Flower used four Xingming guizhi illustrations— without citing the source—to depict the stages of meditation, for example, the uncredited Ying'er xianxing (嬰兒現形; "Revealing the Sacred Embryo") illustration is on the first edition cover, although the book does not mention the Internal Alchemical shengtai ("sacred embryo, embryo of sagehood") concept.

== Examples ==
The following four sample Xingming guizhi illustrations demonstrate the text's comprehensive treatment of Internal Alchemy. Two examples depict alchemical reaction-vessels and culturally symbolic animals, and two others show Daoist "inner landscape" diagrams of the human body.

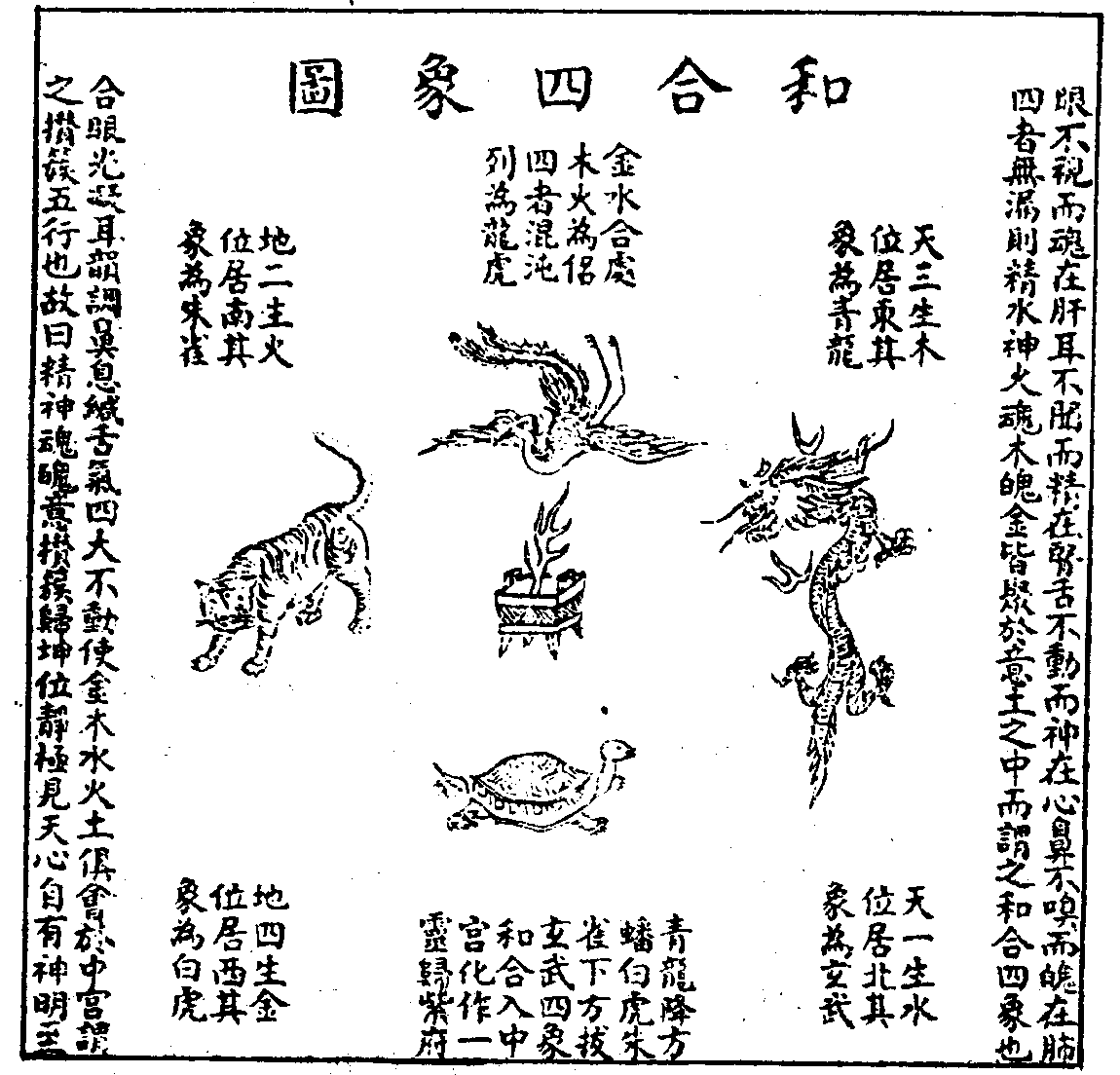
Illustration of Bringing Together the Four Symbols 和合四象圖

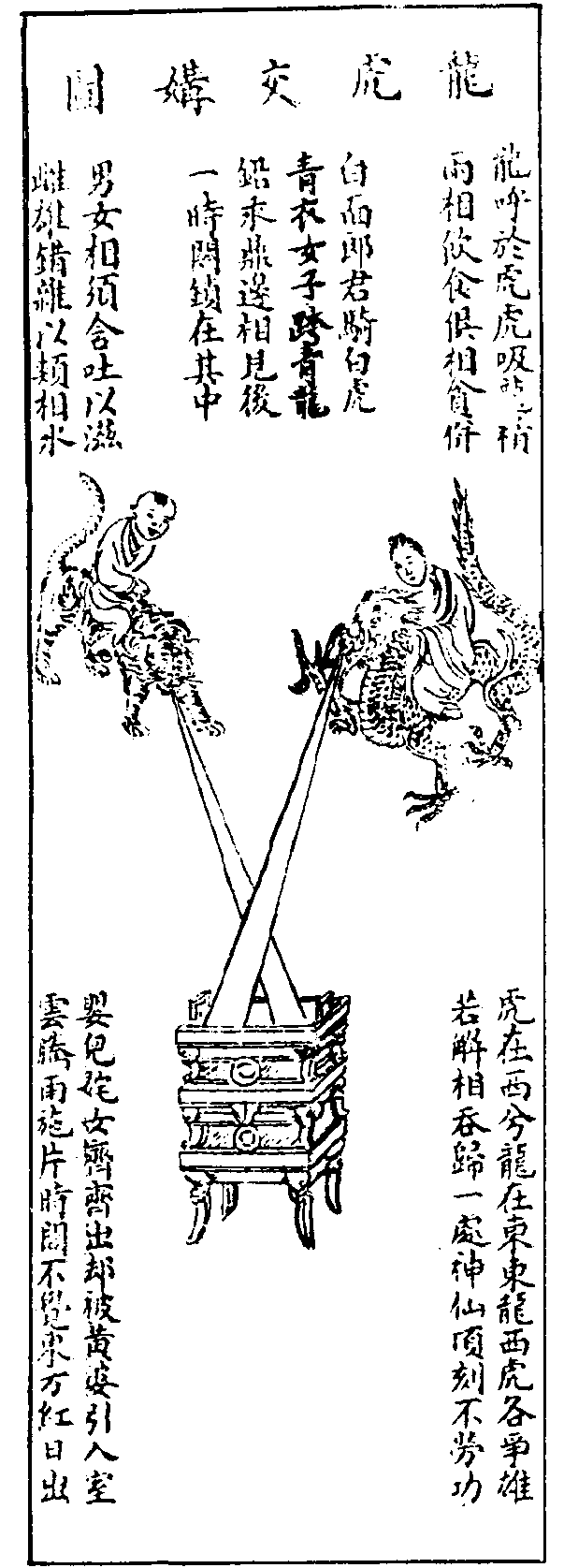
Illustration of the Marriage of the Dragon and the Tiger 龍虎交媾圖

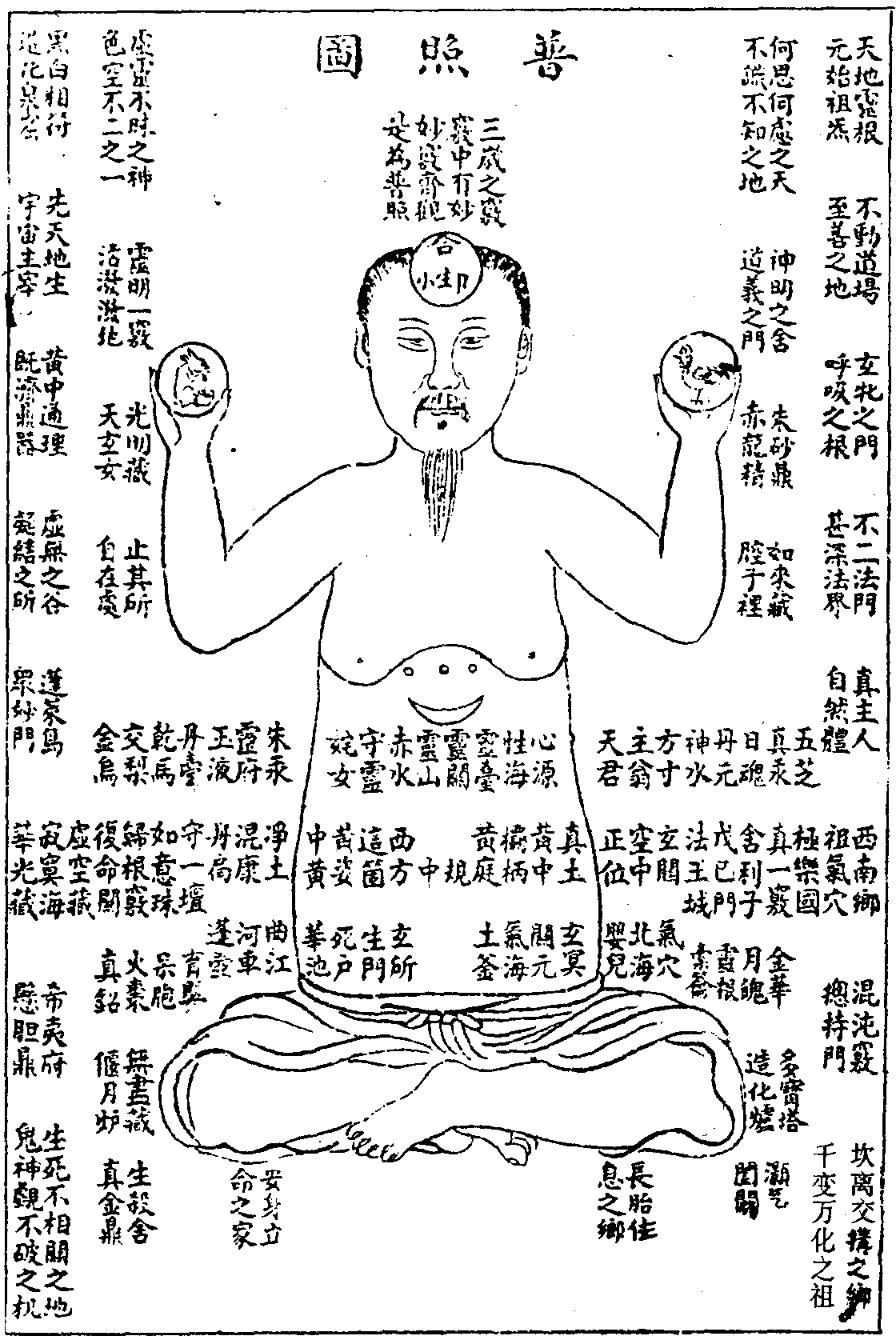
Illustration of Broad Illumination 普照圖)

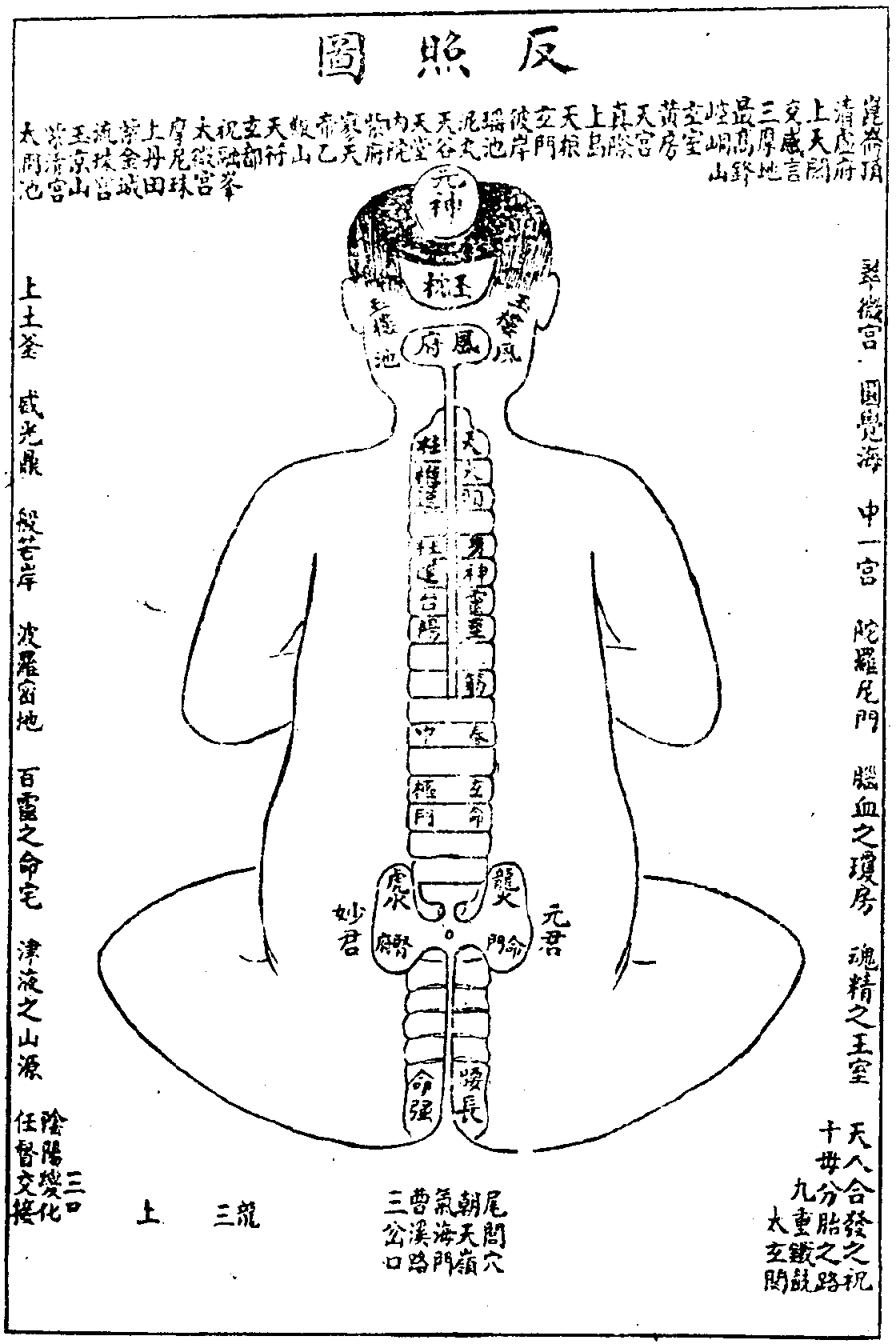
Illustration of Reverse Illumination 反照圖

The first two examples, called the "Illustration of Bringing Together the Four Symbols" and "Illustration of the Marriage of the Dragon and the Tiger" both depict Chinese mythical animals and an alchemical ding cauldron, either round vessels with three legs or rectangular ones with four. In waidan Outer Alchemy, the ding laboratory cauldron was originally used to heat elixir ingredients, while in later neidan Outer Alchemy, Daoist practitioners semantically extended the word to mean the metaphorical cauldron allegedly located in the lower dantian of the human body, wherein an adept cultivated the Three Treasures of Jing ("Essence"), Qi ("Breath"), and Shen ("Spirit").

The Four Symbols are mythological creatures appearing among the Chinese constellations along the ecliptic, and viewed as the guardians of the four cardinal directions. The Black Tortoise (an entwined tortoise and snake) of the North shown on the bottom, represents water and the kidneys; the Vermilion Bird of the South on the top, represents fire and the heart; the Azure Dragon of the East on the right, represents wood and liver; and the White Tiger of the West shown on the left, represents metal and the lungs This Xingming guizhi directional representation of top as bottom and right as left is inverted, "like so much else in physiological alchemy".

This Four Symbols illustration shows the symbolical animals of the four directions surrounding and influencing the bodily alchemical crucible, here labeled zhenyi (真意; "realized will"). The realized will is explained in the text as "the prime of the trigram qian [(乾, ☰,) three unbroken yang lines], the mother of the heavens and the earth, the root of yin and yang, the source of water and fire, the ancestor of the sun and moon, the font of the three materials [the heavens, the earth, and humanity], and the progenitor of the Five Phases." In the top right inscription, the word wulou (無漏; "not leaking"); or [Buddhist] "passionless", from Sanskrit anāsrava) refers to that which "normally 'leaks out' through the sense-organs and other parts of the body"

The "Illustration of the Marriage of the Dragon and the Tiger" (tr. Little), or "The Love-Making of Dragon and Tiger" (tr. Needham and Lu), title uses jiaogou (交媾; "have sexual intercourse; mate"). The Azure Dragon, symbol of yang, and the White Tiger, symbol of yin, are shown infusing their energies into the alchemical crucible. A girl dressed in blue-green robes rides the dragon, symbol of yin within yang, while a white-faced boy rides the tiger, symbol of yang within yin. These images suggest the trigrams 離; li, ☲, two unbroken yang lines enclosing a broken yin line) and kan, ☵, two broken yin lines enclosing an unbroken yang line), which represent toxic mercury and lead, the two fundamental elements transformed in Inner Alchemy. The dragon and tiger symbolizing the Yang and Yin was shown on many old Chinese numismatic charms and amulets.

The last two examples, called the Illustration of Broad Illumination and the Illustration of Reverse Illumination—or "Universal Radiance" and "The Glory of Reversion"—show the inner landscapes of the anterior and posterior human body.

The front Illustration of Broad Illumination depicts a neidan meditator sitting cross-legged, and shows three circles. His right hand holds a hare enclosed in a circle, symbolizing of the mythological moon rabbit, and his left hand holds a crow enclosed in a circle, an ancient symbol of the three-legged sun crow. On his forehead the three-character phrase he xingming (和性命; "to join endowment and vitality") is enclosed in another circle. These three circles represent the yang and yin energies of the body to the left and the right, and their union in the center. The crescent shown on the meditator's abdomen represents the alchemical reaction vessel in the lower dantian ("cinnabar field; energy center"). However, the 1615 first edition Xingming guizhi more complexly pictured the crescent above a rectangle and a ding crucible in the lower dantian. According to Needham and Lu, this illustration shows "the triumphant adept with the sun in one hand and the moon in the other, Yin and Yang united" within the neidan elixir; and in this context, and the dan in dantian means "vital internal warmth", thus, dantian could be thought of as production centers of "animal heat".

The back Illustration of Reverse Illumination shows the vertebral column, which is flanked by the (anatomically misplaced) "kidneys" in the lower back; which are respectively labeled as longhuo (龍火; "dragon fire") on the right, a symbol of yang energy within the yin side of the body, and hushui (虎水; "tiger water") on the left, a symbol of yin energy within the yang side of the body. The head circle, which corresponds to the "to join endowment and vitality" above, encloses the word yuanshen (元神; "original spirit"), one of the sanyuan ("three origins", along with the 元精; yuanjing; "original essence" and 元氣; yuanqi; "original breath").

This Reverse Illumination drawing shows twenty-four "vertebra", labeled with the traditional Chinese medical acupoint names for fourteen of the twenty-eight points on the Dumai (督脈) Governing Vessel, from GV-1 Changqiang (長強; "Long and Strong") to GV-14 Dazhui (大椎; "Great Vertebra"), between the coccyx and the anus. This location is associated with the ancient Daoist sexual theory of male avoidance of ejaculation, called Huanjing bunao (還精補腦; "returning the semen to replenish the brain"); Daoist physiologists imagined that unejaculated jing (精; "semen; [medical] essence of life") could rise up the spine into the brain in order increase health and longevity (cf. the Indian susumna channel). The common method of preventing ejaculation was to apply pressure on the perineum, halfway between the anus and the scrotum, resulting in retrograde ejaculation redirecting semen into the urinary bladder, where it was subsequently voided.

== Gallery ==
Click to enlarge, more images here.

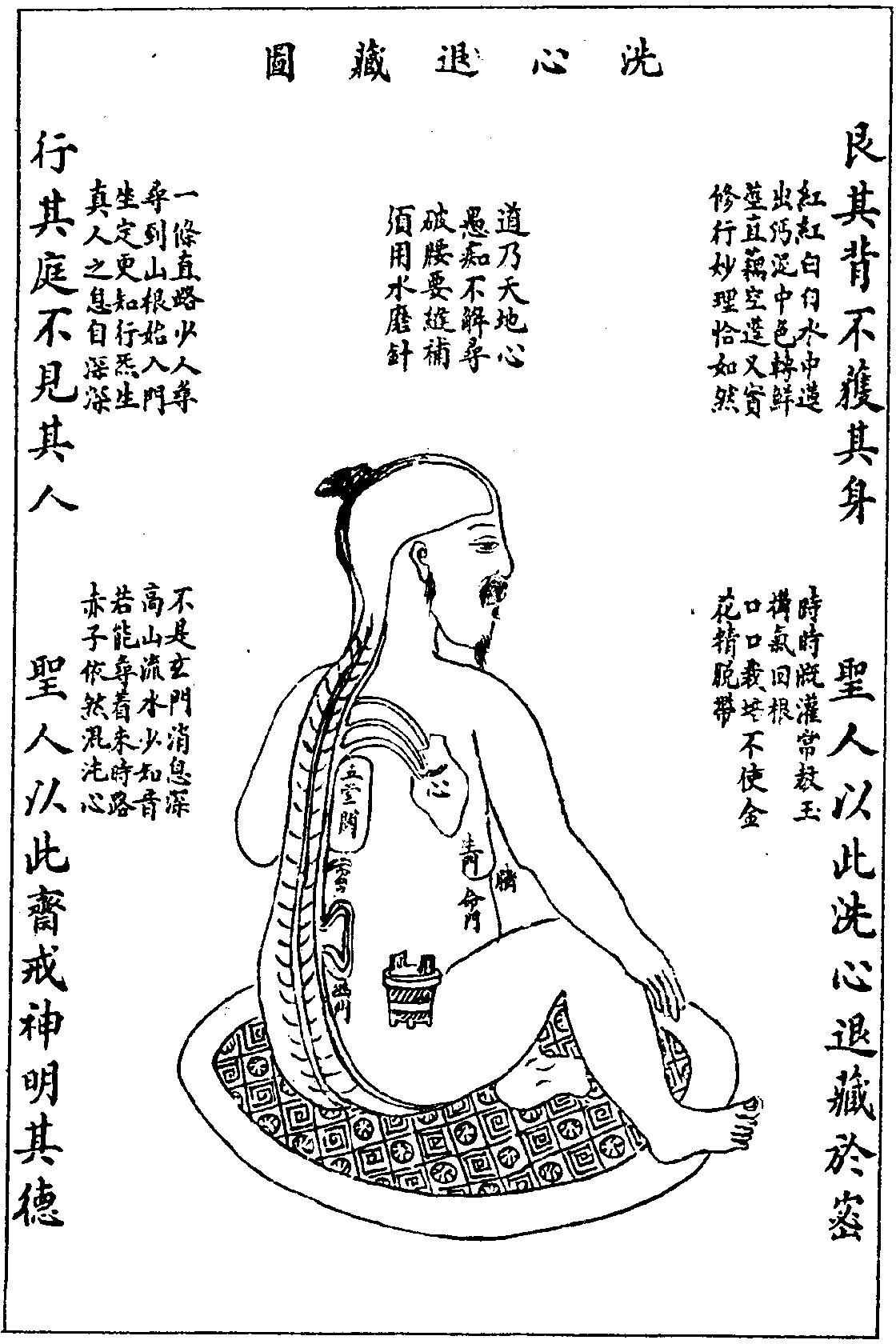
Washing the Heart-Mind and Storing [the Secretions] Inwardly 洗心退藏圖

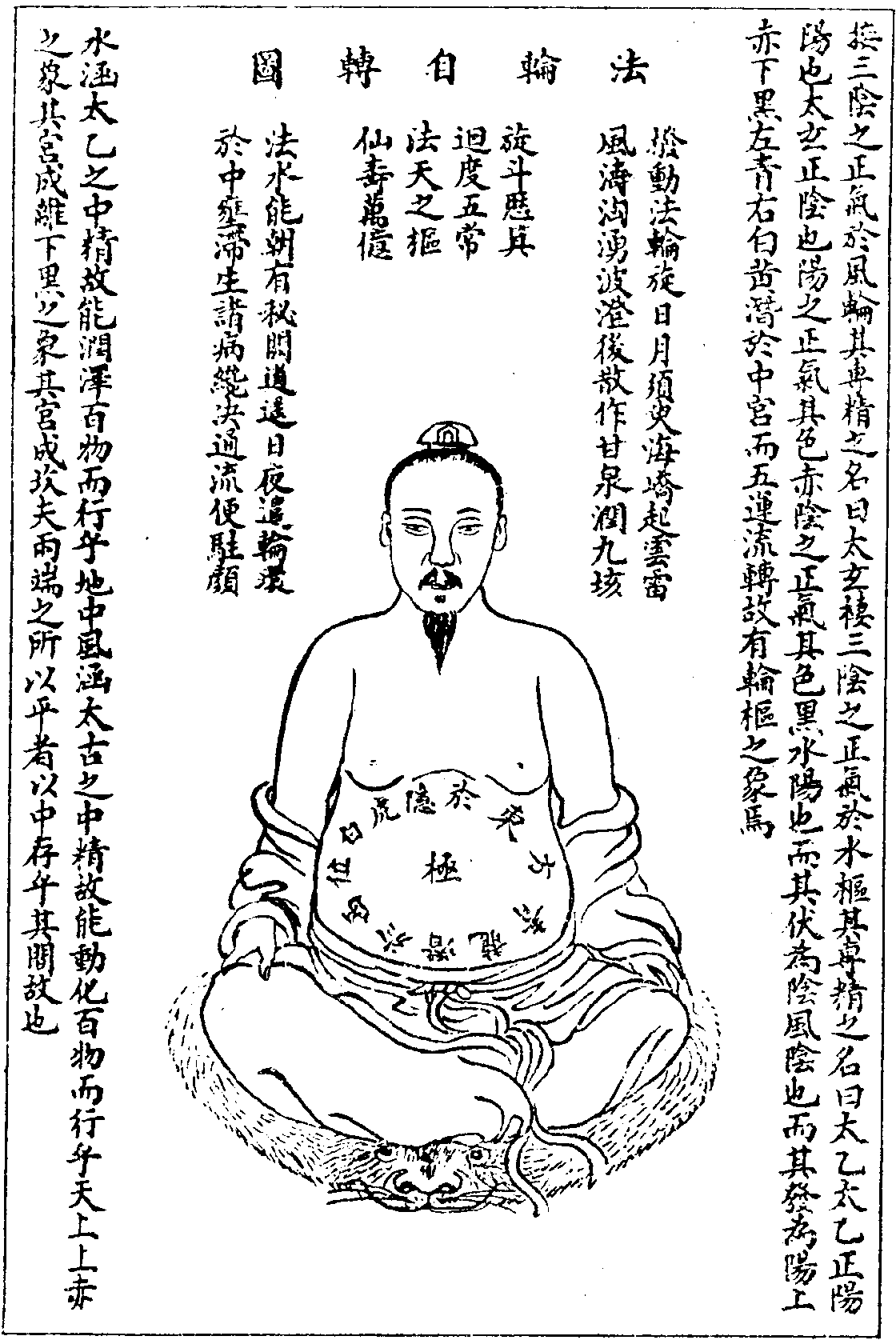
The Dharma Wheel Turns Itself 法輪自轉圖

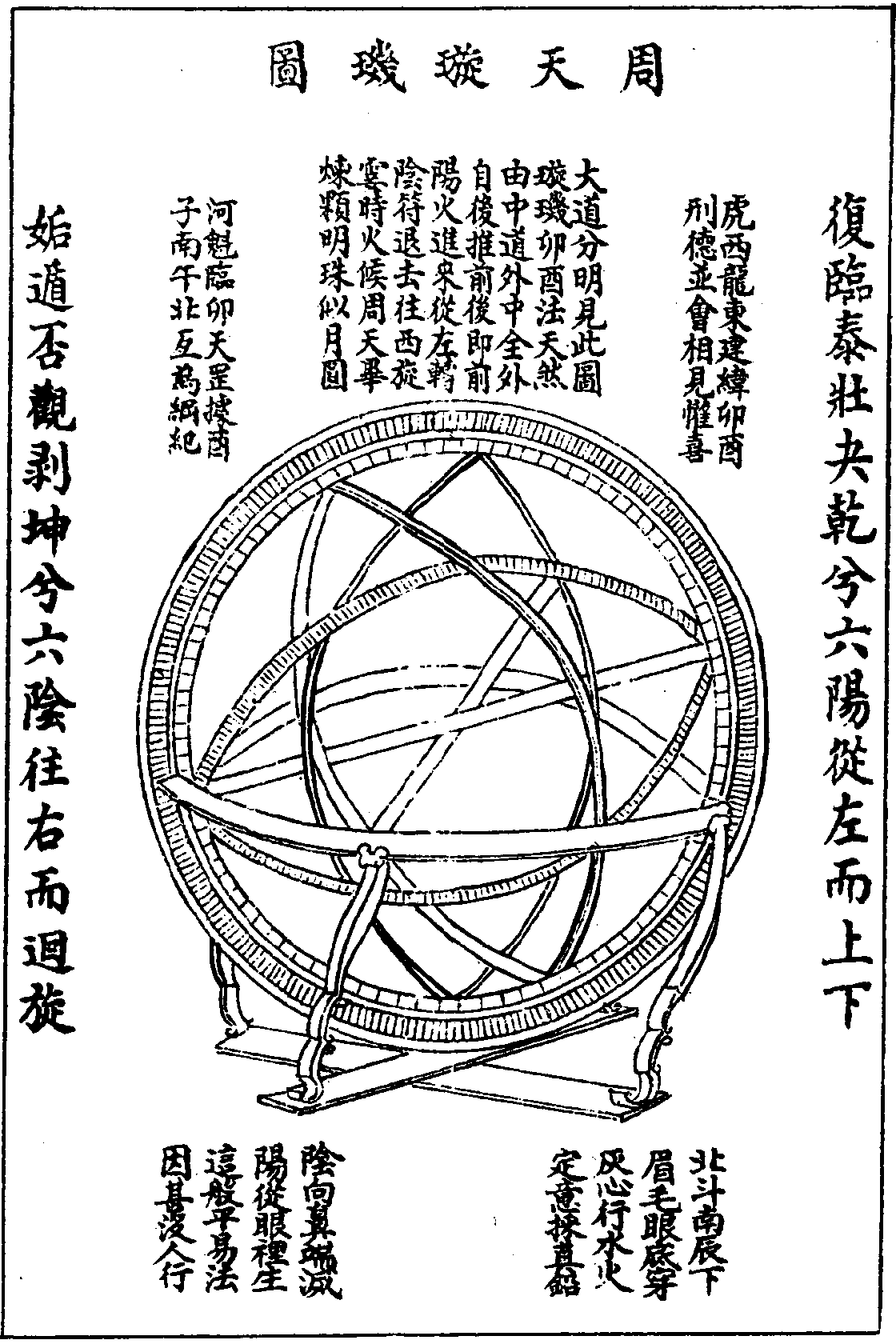
Armillary Sphere 周天璇璣圖

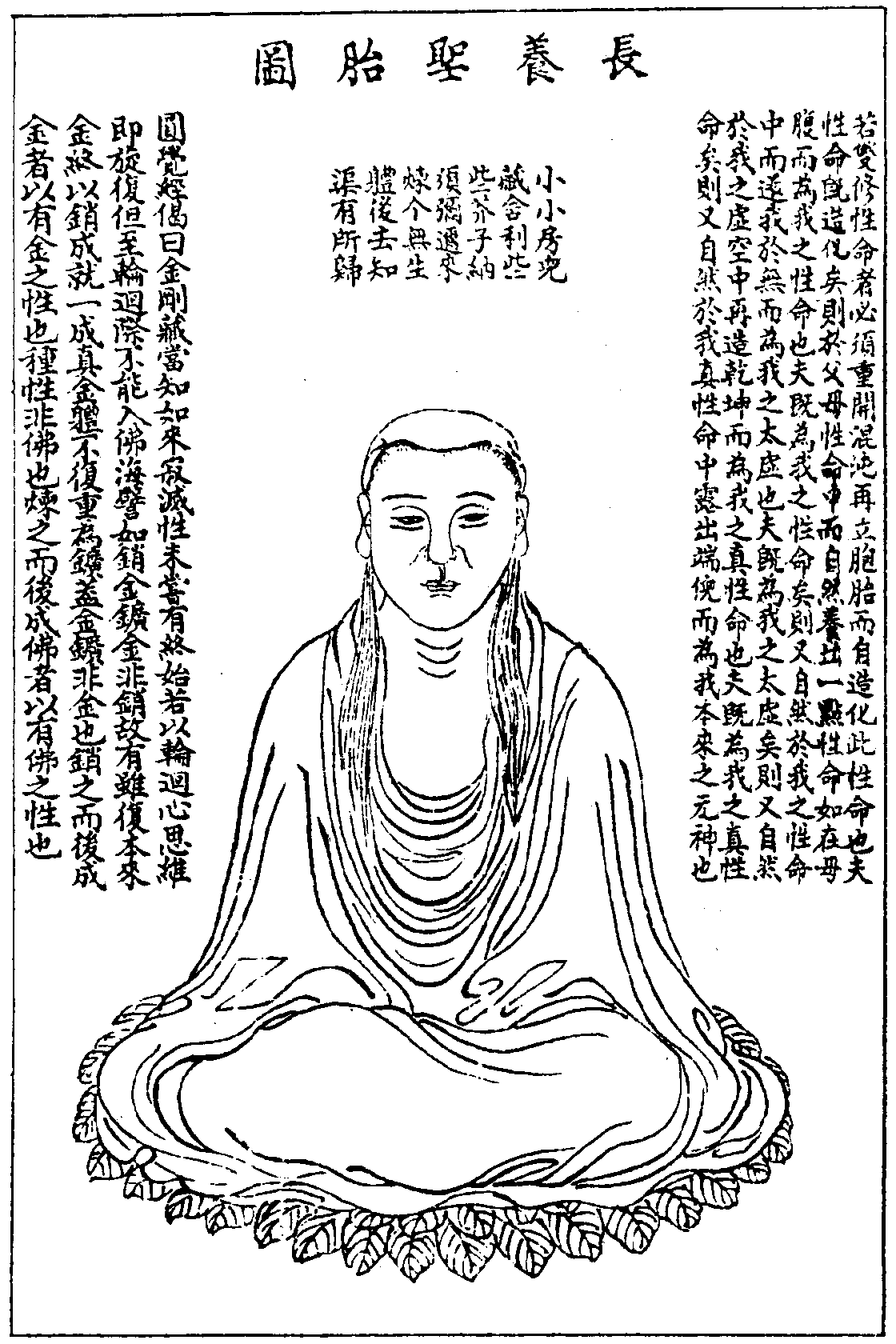
Nurturing the Holy Embryo 長養聖胎圖

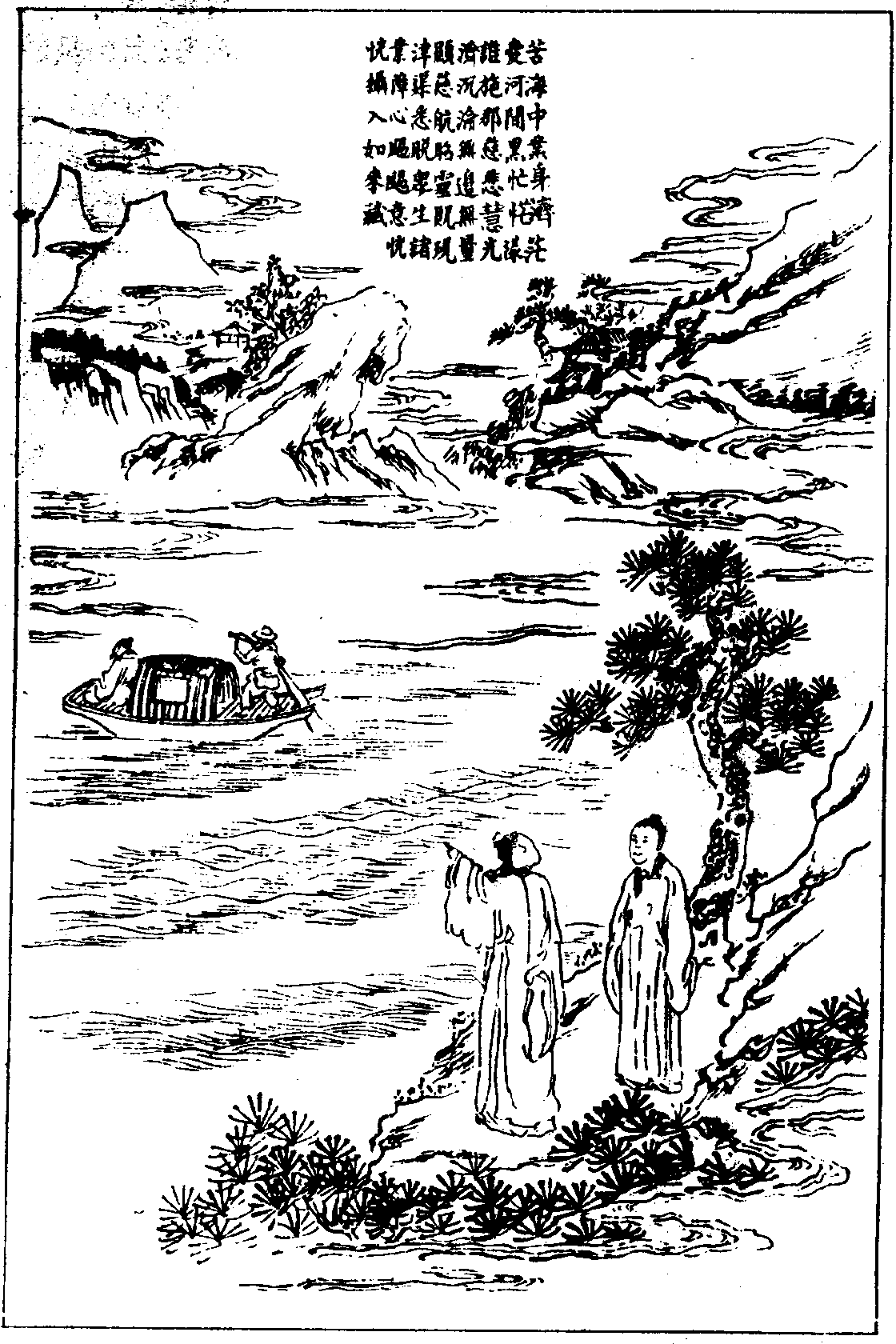
Escaping from the Sea of Suffering 出離苦海圖

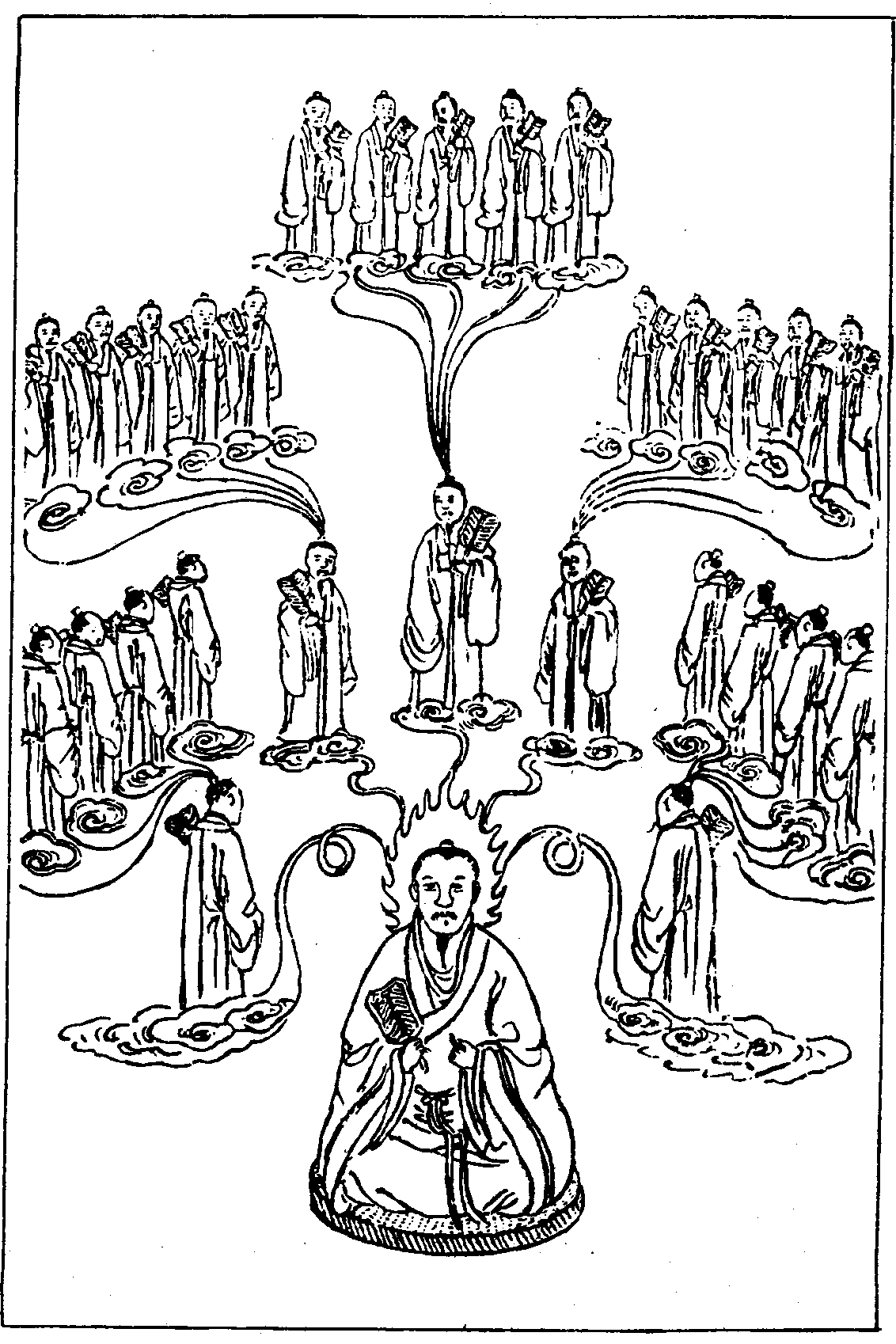
Transforming the Body Multiplied by Five 化身五五圖

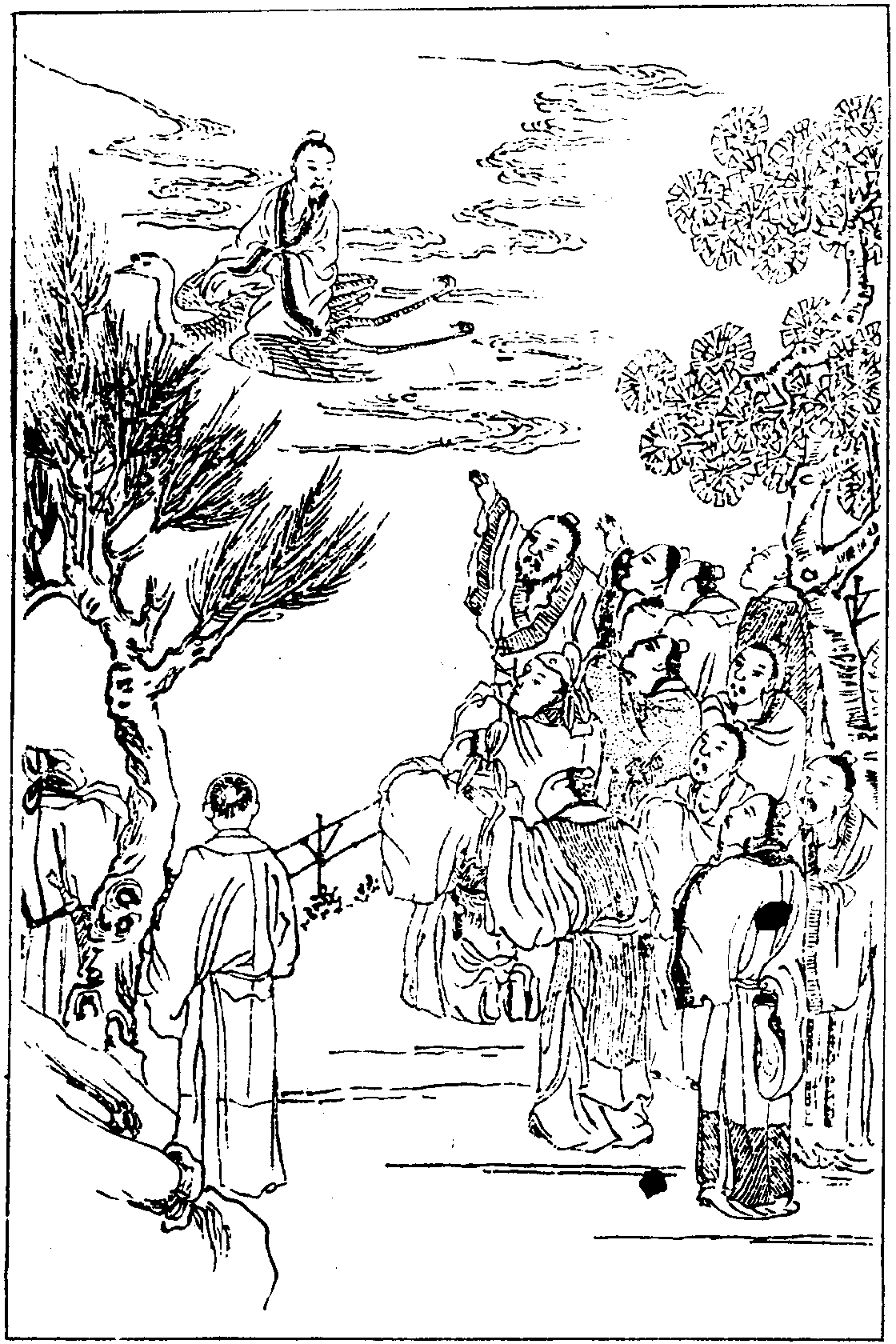
Riding the Phoenix Up into the Clouds 跨鳳凌霄圖

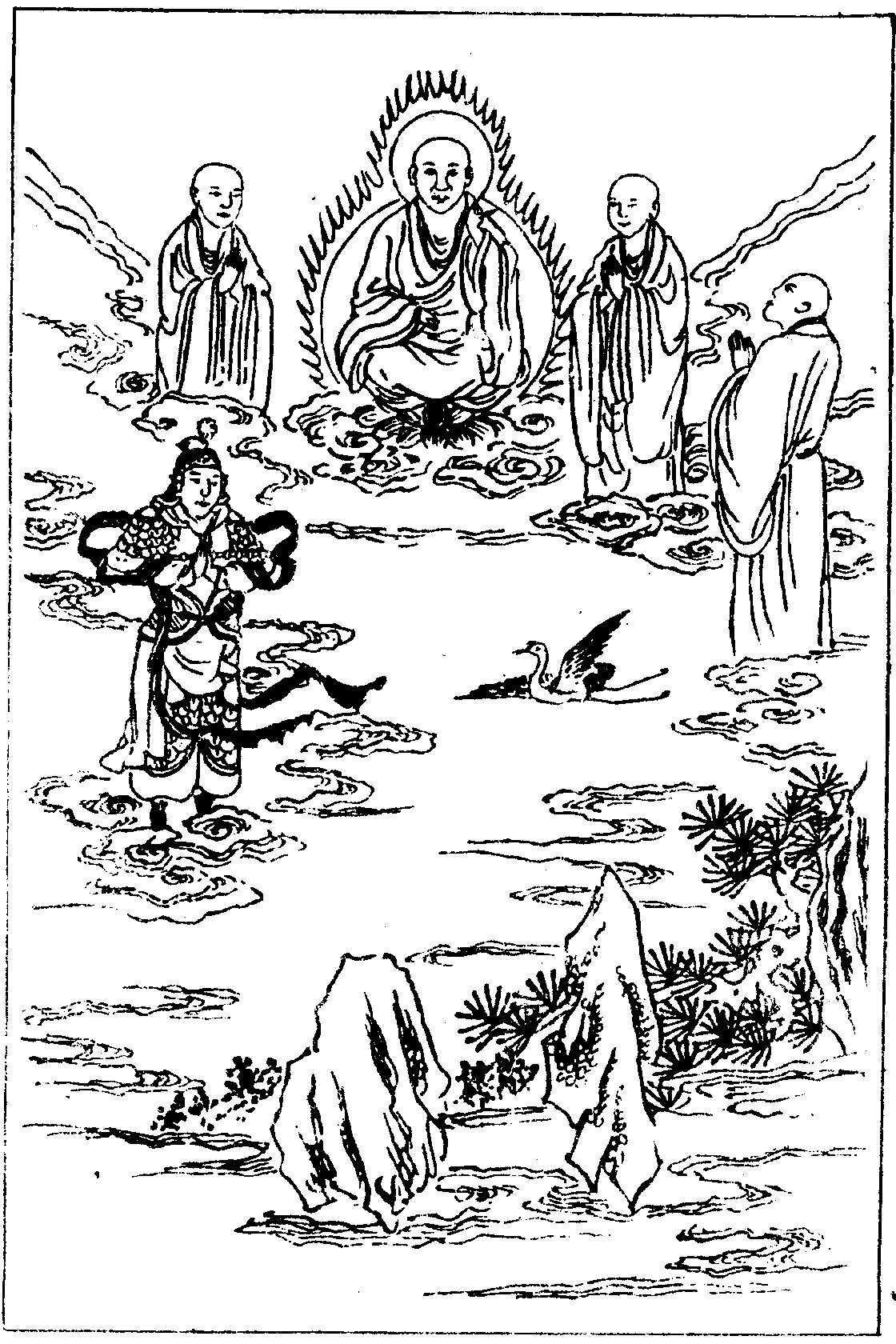
Transcending the Three Realms 超出三界圖

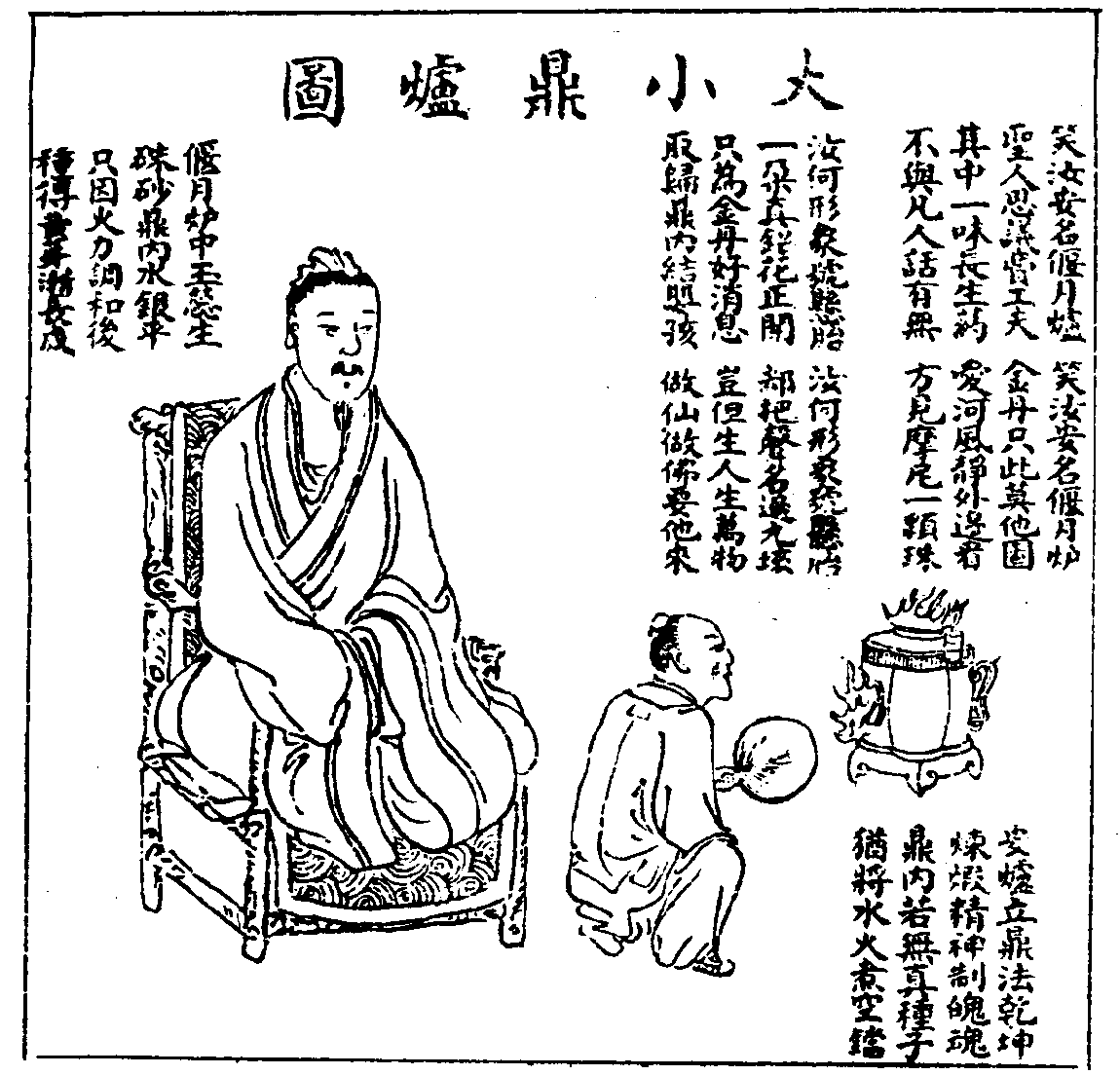
The Greater Cauldron and the Lesser Furnace 大小鼎爐圖

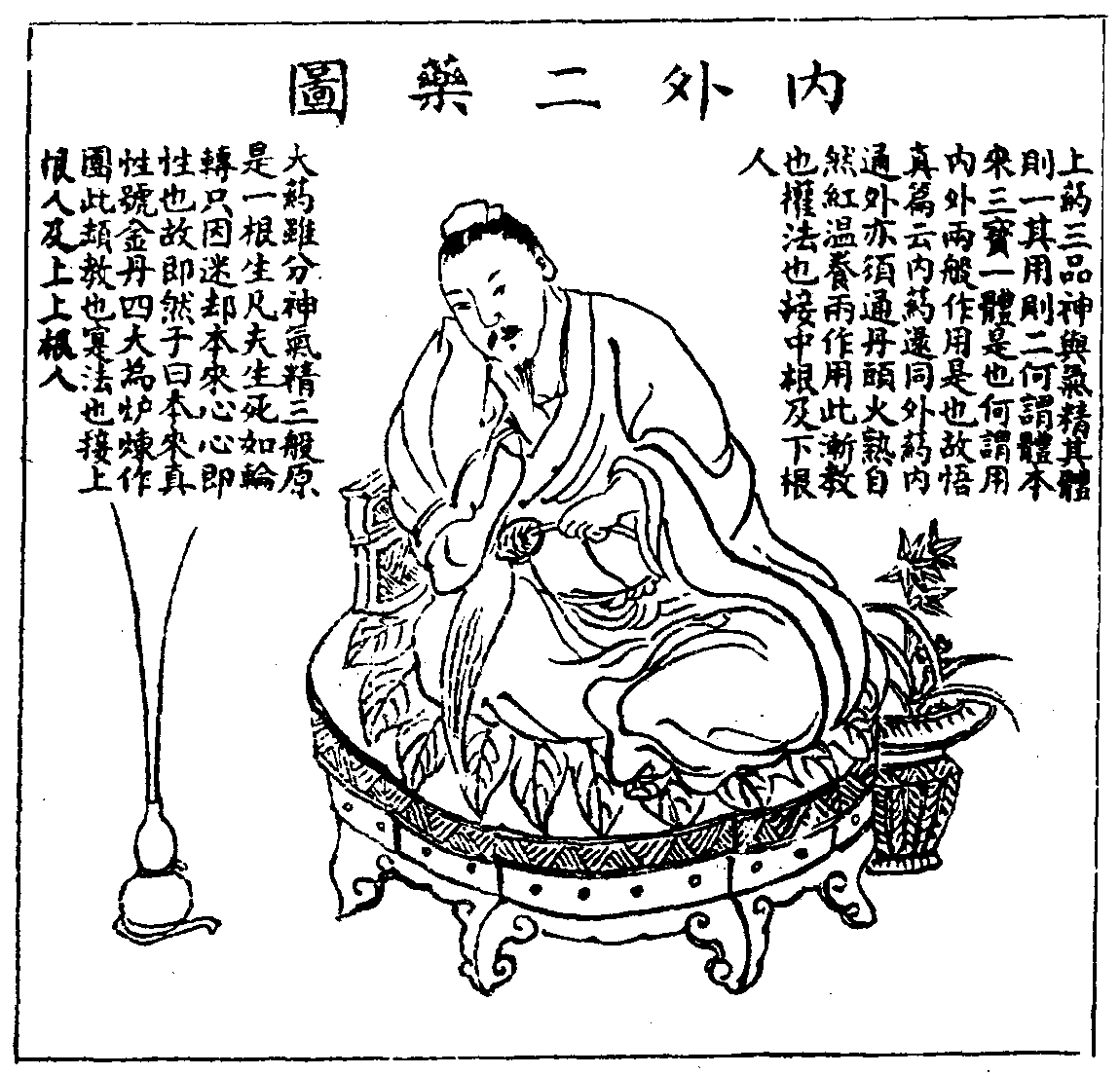
The Inner and Outer Elixirs 內外二藥圖

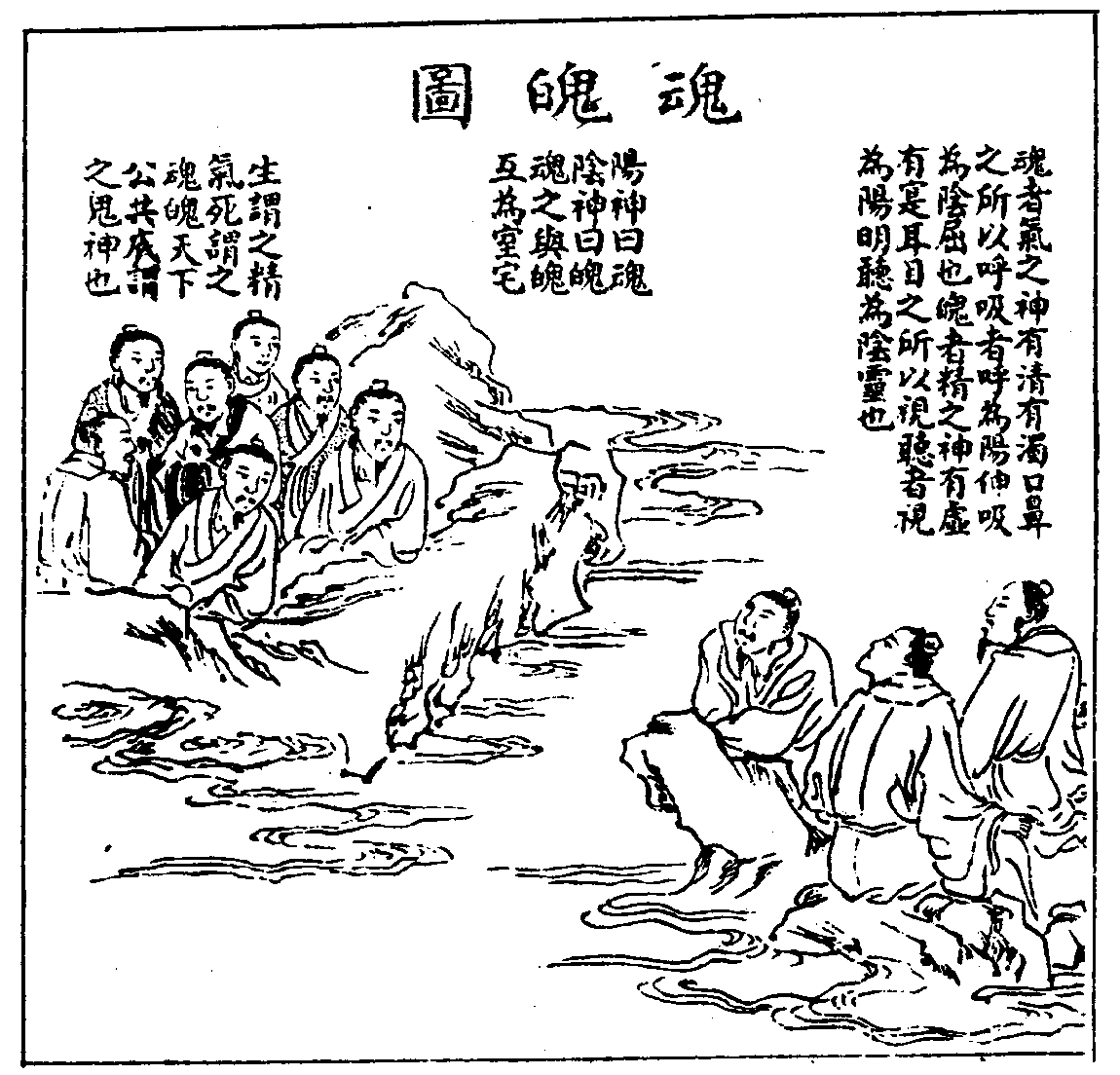
The Hun and Po Souls 魂魄圖

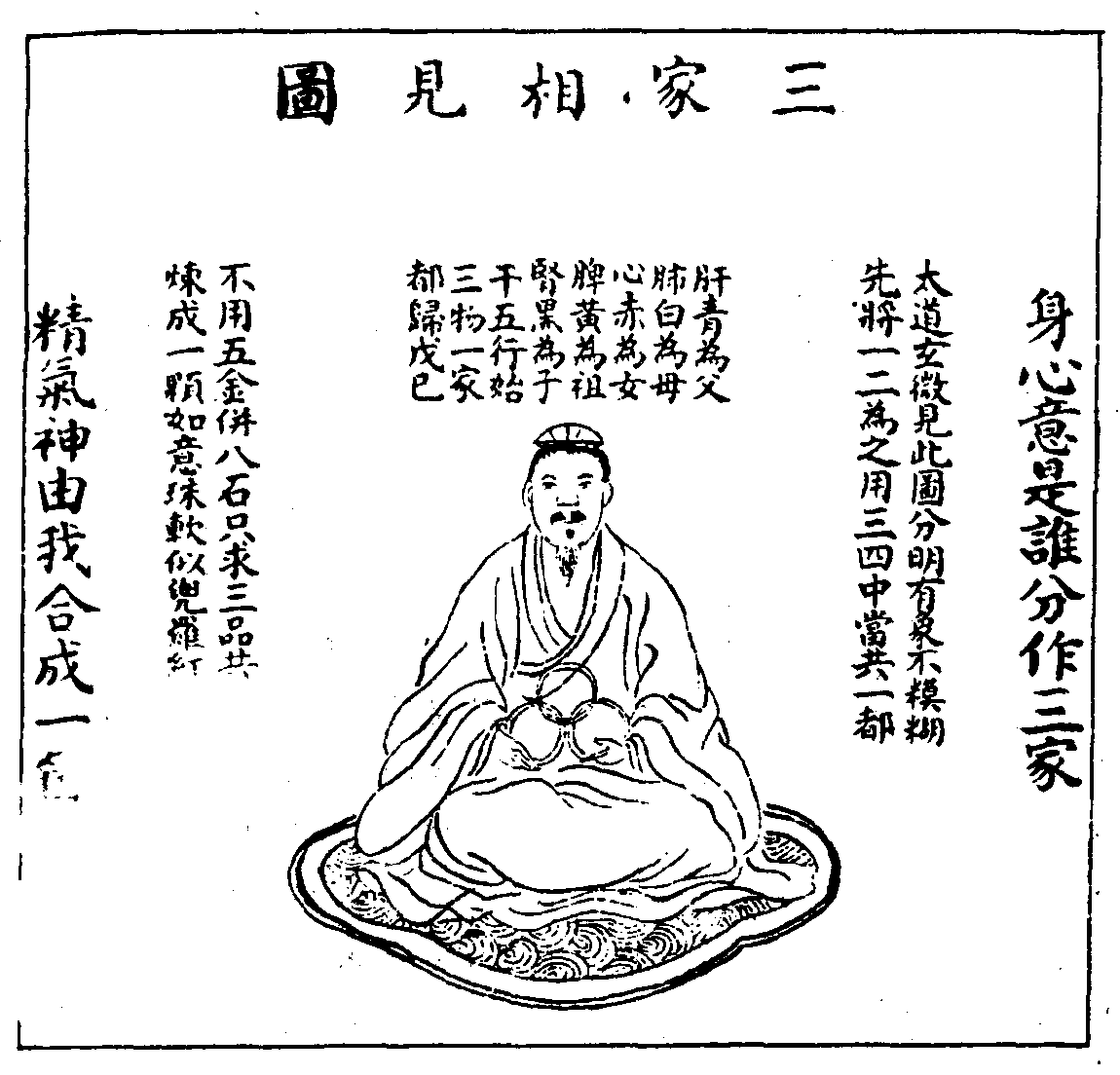
The Three Vitalities Meeting 三家相見圖

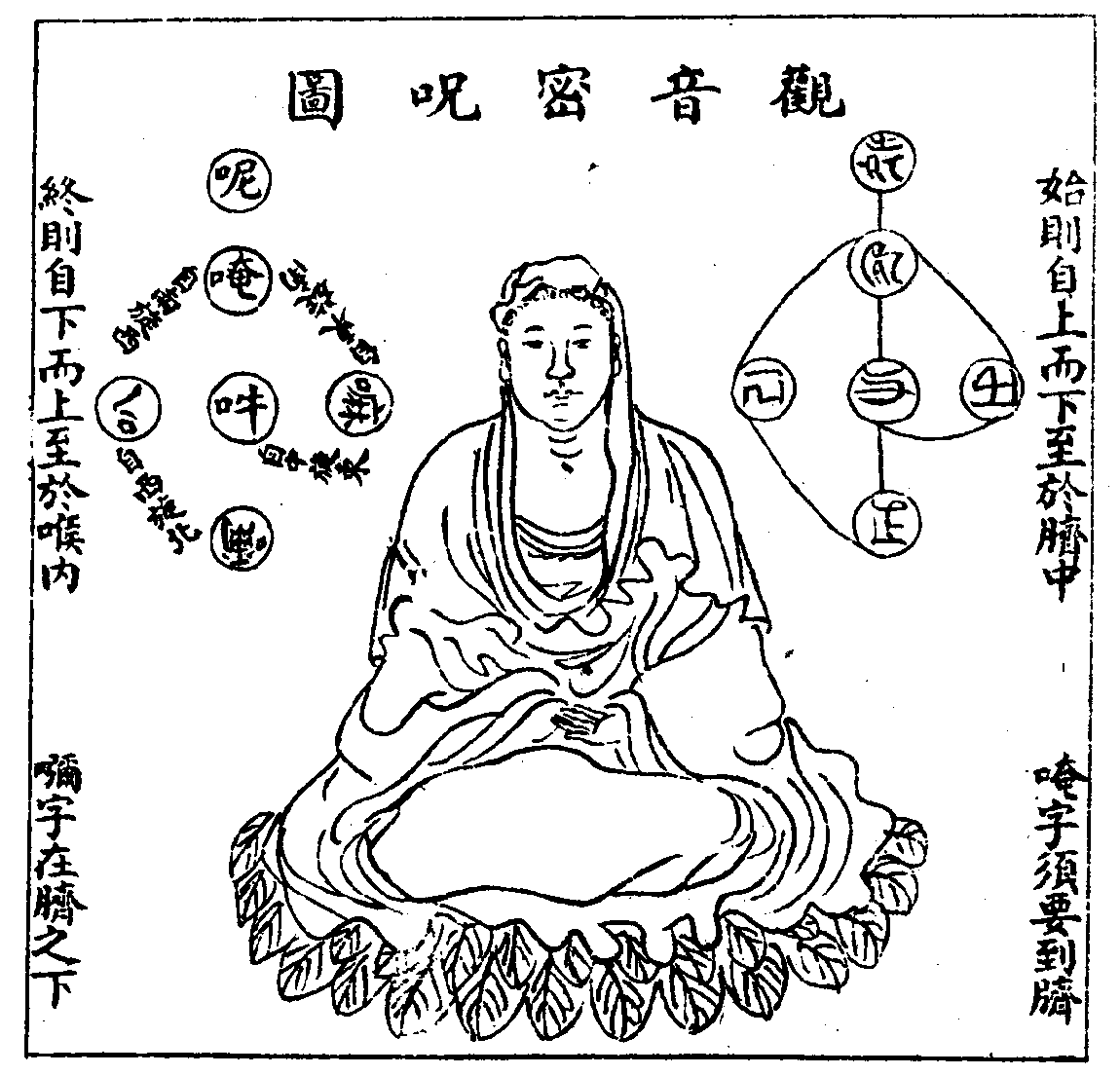
Guanyin’s Esoteric Incantation 觀音密呪圖

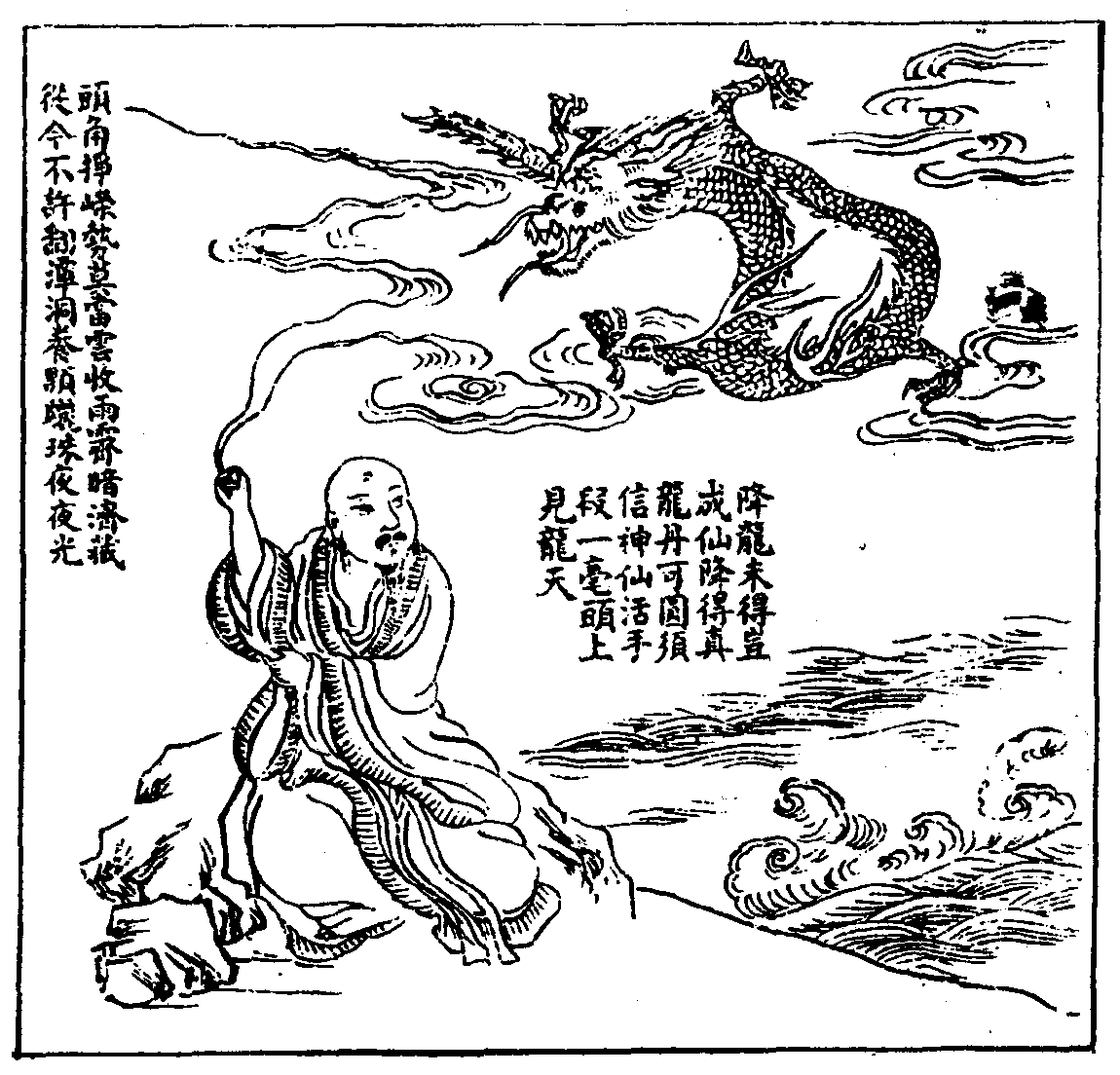
Subduing the Dragon 降龍圖

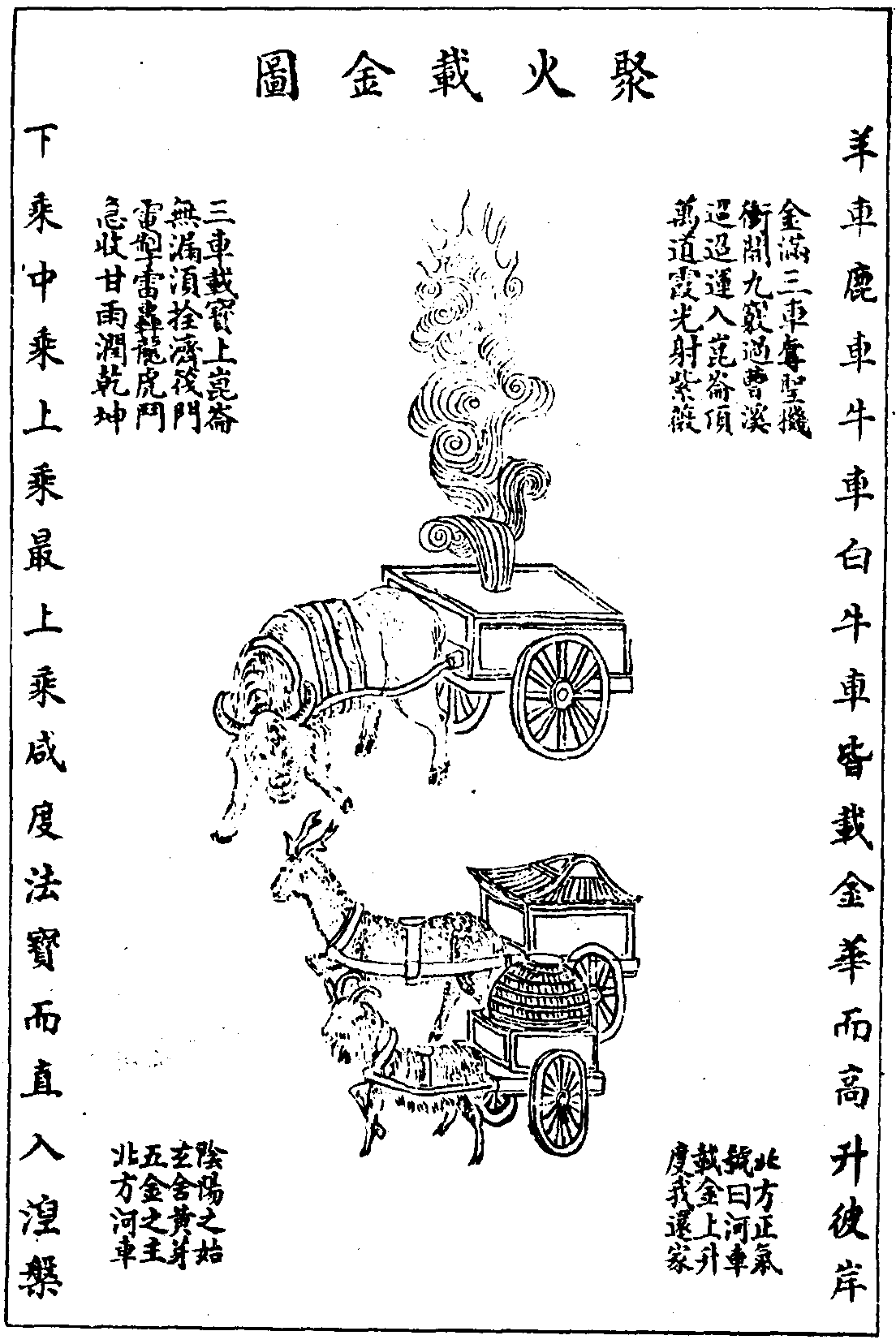
Collecting Fire and Transporting Gold 聚火載金圖

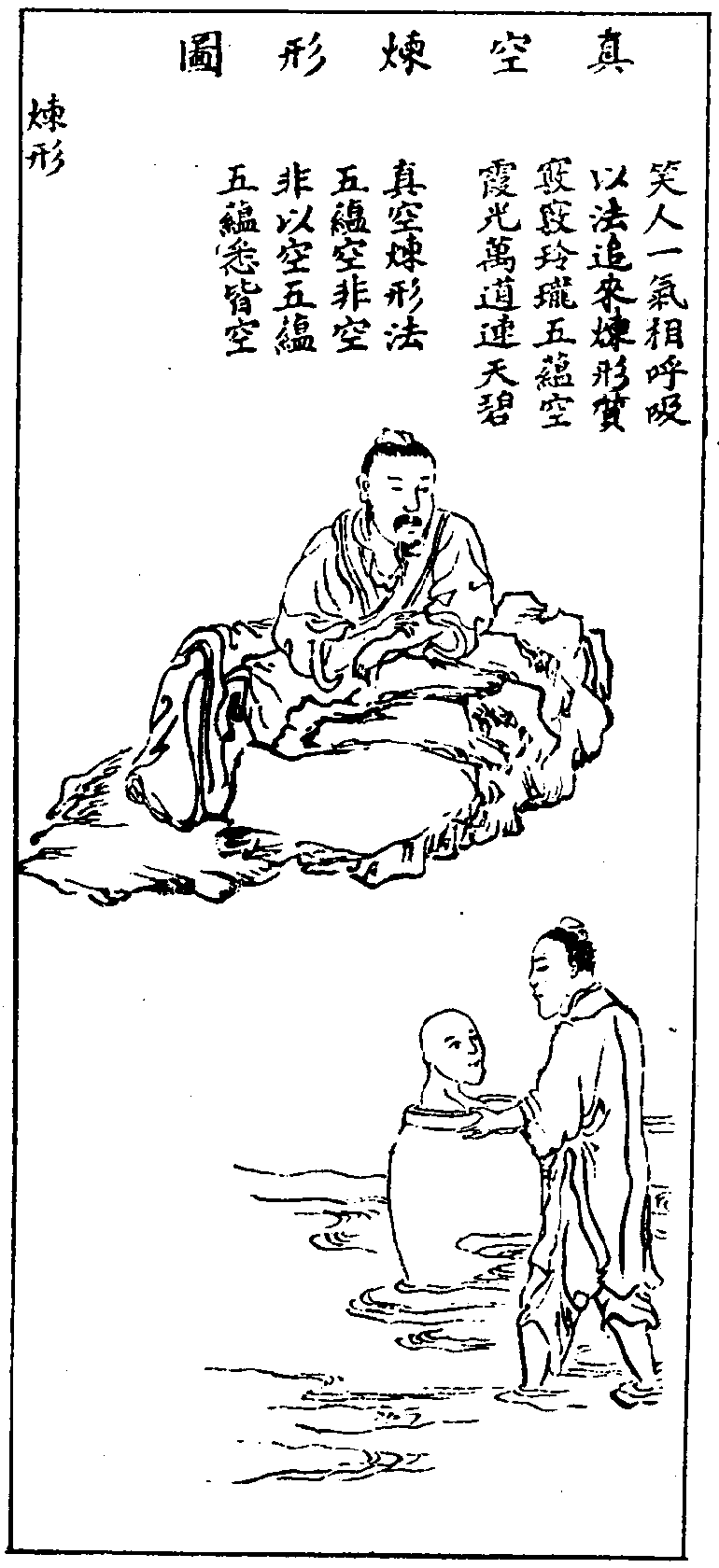
Refining Form in the True Void 真空煉形
