= Gao Di =

Gao Di may refer to:

- Emperor Gaozu of Han, also known as Emperor Gao or Gao Di
- Emperor Gao of Southern Qi (齊高帝), or Gao Di of Southern Qi
- Gao Di (politician) (高狄; born 1927), Communist Party chief of Jilin Province
- Gao Di (footballer) (高迪; born 1990), Chinese footballer
