= You Tong =

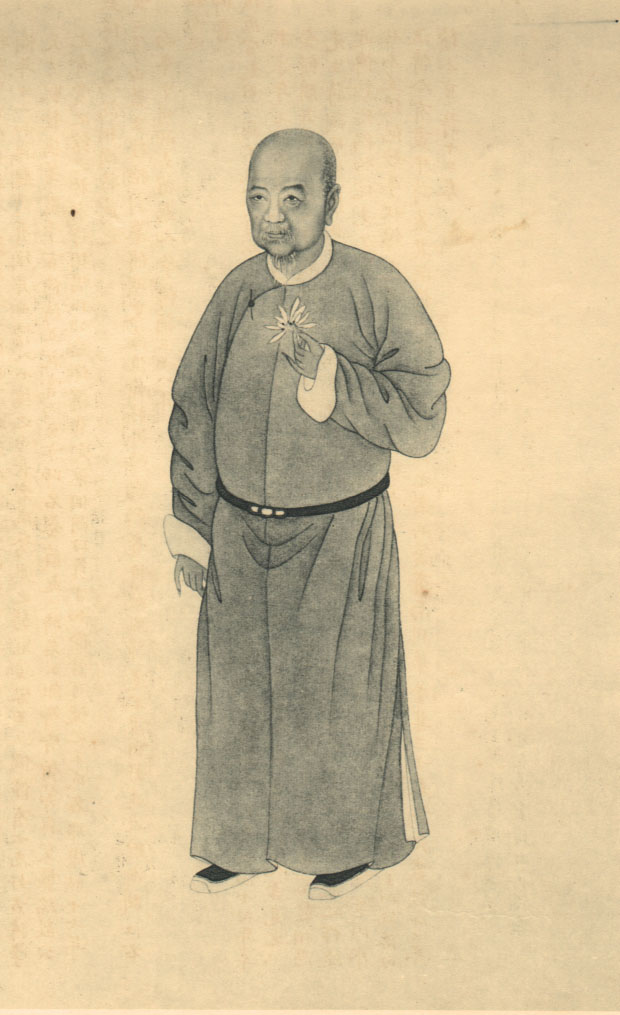
You Tong, 19th century portrait

You Tong (Chinese: 尤侗; 1618-1704) was a Chinese author and literary critic.

You was a native of Suzhou. After the fall of the Ming dynasty he made repeated attempts to pass the Imperial examination, eventually succeeding at the age of sixty-one. After this he worked as a historian at the Hanlin Academy, although he did briefly hold a role as magistrate during the early 1650s. He was a noted member of the literati of his time, and was especially celebrated for his plays. He wrote primarily in the zaju (Northern) style, but his song-plays, while highly regarded, were considered impossible to stage and so were primarily read rather than watched.

== Retirement and Taoism ==
In his late seventies, You, having been a renown writer and influenced by Taoism during his lifetime, began compiling a personal nianpu. He commissioned sixteen paintings that illustrated moments from his life and wrote poetic captions to accompany them. These works were part of his book, Pictures and Poems for My Annalistic Autobiography (Nianpu Tushi), which was prefaced in 1694 and mainly focused on non-official aspects of his life and his fascination with Taoist transcendence.

In addition to the sixteen paintings, the book includes four extra pictures of You enjoying leisure time, featuring scenes from 1664, 1670, and 1695, with acknowledgments to the artists and poetic praises from You and several notable literary figures. One picture, titled Pictorial Dream of an Excursion to the Three Islands of the Immortals (Meng you Sanshan tu), was created in 1696 which shows You surrounded by five esteemed Taoist writers such as Li Bai and Su Shi.
