= Three Corpses =

Daost physiological belief

Sanshi
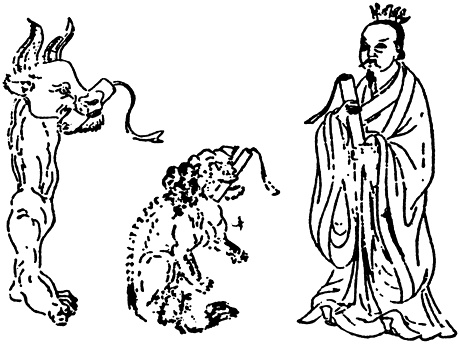
- "Three Corpses" illustration from the 9th century Chu sanshi jiuchong baoshengjing (除三尸九蟲保生經)
- Chinese: 三尸
- Literal meaning: three corpses
Transcriptions
Standard Mandarin
- Hanyu Pinyin: sānshī
- Wade–Giles: san-shih
Middle Chinese
- Middle Chinese: sansyij
Old Chinese
- Baxter–Sagart (2014): s.ruml̥[ə]j

Alternative Chinese name
- Traditional Chinese: 三蟲
- Simplified Chinese: 三虫
- Literal meaning: three worms
Transcriptions
Standard Mandarin
- Hanyu Pinyin: sānchóng
- Wade–Giles: san-ch'ung
Middle Chinese
- Middle Chinese: sandrjuwng
Old Chinese
- Baxter–Sagart (2014): s.rumC.lruŋ

The Three Corpses (Chinese: 三尸; pinyin: sānshī) or Three Worms (Chinese: 三蟲; pinyin: sānchóng) are a Daoist physiological belief that demonic creatures live inside the human body, and they seek to hasten the death of their host. These three supernatural parasites allegedly enter the person at birth, and reside in the three dantian "energy centers", respectively located within the head, chest, and abdomen. After their human host dies, they are freed from the body and become malevolent ghosts.

The pernicious Three Corpses/Worms work to harm their host's health and fate by initiating sicknesses, inviting other disease-causing agents into the body, and reporting their host's transgressions to the gods. The Three Corpses are supposed to keep records of their host's misdeeds, ascend to tian "heaven" bimonthly on the night of Chinese sexagenary gengshen (庚申; "57th of the 60-day cycle") while the host is sleeping, and file reports to the Siming (司命; "Director of Destinies") who deducts a certain number of days from the person's life for each misdeed. One way of avoiding this bureaucratic snitching is to stay awake for the entire gengshen day and night, thus preventing the Three Corpses from leaving one's body (a belief later assimilated into the Japanese Kōshin tradition).

For a Daoist adept to achieve the longevity of a xian "transcendent", it was necessary to expel the Three Corpses from the body. Since these evil spirits feed upon decaying matter produced by grains being digested in the intestines, the practice of bigu "abstinence from grains and cereals" is the first step towards expelling them. Bigu alone will not eliminate the Three Corpses, but weakens them to the point where they can be killed with waidan alchemical drugs such as cinnabar, and ultimately eliminated through neidan meditation techniques.

== Terminology ==
The Chinese terms sānshī and sānchóng compound sān (三) meaning "three, 3; several, many" with shī (尸 or 屍; "corpse, dead body; ritual personator representing a dead relative during Chinese ancestral sacrifices") and chóng (蟲 or 虫; "insect; worm; bug").

The usual English translation of sanshi is "three corpses" or "Three Corpses". However, this Daoist term does not literally refer to "corpses; dead bodies" within the human body, but is linguistically causative meaning the eventual "death; mortality" produced by these demonic agents. Compare the English slang verb corpse meaning "to make a corpse of, to kill" (Oxford English Dictionary 2009). More accurate translations of sanshi are "Three Deathbringers", "three corpse-demons", or "three corpse [evils]".

Synonyms for sanshi include fúshī (伏尸; "hidden corpse"), shīchóng (尸虫; "corpse worms"), shīguǐ (尸鬼; "corpse ghosts"), and in reference to the three corpses named Peng (see Baoshengjing below), shīpéng (尸彭; "corpse Pengs") or sānpéng (三彭; "three Pengs"). Sānshīshén (三尸神; "Lord Three Corpses") is an honorific alternate with shen "spirit; god; deity"

Sanchong, which the Lunheng (see below) used to mean "intestinal parasites", is normally translated as "three worms" or "Three Worms"; "Three Cadavers" is another version. Owing to the semantic polysemy of chong, the term is also translatable as "three pests" or "three bugs".

The expressions Three Corpses and Three Worms are used in traditional Chinese medicine. Zhang and Unschuld define two meanings for sanchong: "Etiological Agent of all microorganisms in the body that bring forth disease", citing Li Shizhen's (1578) Bencao Gangmu that, "Bugs/worms are small organisms. There are very many types. This is the meaning of 'three bugs/worms'"; and "Combined Designation of huichong (蛔蟲; "roundworms"), chichong (赤蟲; "red worms"), and naochong (蟯蟲; "pinworms"), citing the (c. 610) Zhubing yuanhou zonglun (諸病源候總論; "General Treatise of Causes and Symptoms of Illnesses"), "The three worms include long worms, red worms, and pinworms". They give sanshi 三尸 "three corpse [bugs/worms]" as an alternative name for shichong 屍蟲 "corpse bugs/worms", and define it as the "Etiological Agent of microorganisms that can bring forth all types of shibing 屍病 "corpse [qi] disease", citing the Zhubing yuanhou zonglun again that, "Inside the human body there are from the beginning all the three corpse [bugs/worms]. They come to life together with man, but they are most malicious. They are able to communicate with demons and the numinous, and they regularly invite evil [qi] from outside, thereby causing human suffering".

Demonic possession and demonic medicine are ancient Chinese beliefs. For example, the Bencao gangmu chapter (52) on medicines derived from the human body says "bregma; skull bone" is good for treating tuberculosis-like consumptive diseases that are supposedly caused by evil spirits, such as chuánshī (傳尸), which is translated as "cadaver vector disease", "consumptive and infectious disease", and "corpse [evil] transmission".

Since the Chinese notion of "Three Corpses" within the human body is unfamiliar to most Westerners, meaningful English descriptions are problematic. Scholars have termed them as

- gods:
  - "transcendental beings";
  - "supernatural beings with physical and ephemeral spirit components";
  - "internal gods";
- demons:
  - "a sort of demon";
  - "maleficent demons";
  - "malevolent beings in the body";
  - "demonic supernatural creatures";
- both:
  - "semi-divine, semi-demonic agents".
- parasites:
  - "biospiritual parasites";
  - "body parasites";
  - "parasites said to live inside the human body".
- other terms:
  - "factors in the human body".

== Daoist internal deities ==
In Daoist physiology, the human body contains many indwellers besides the Three Corpses. Nèishén (内神; "internal spirits/gods") and shēnshén (身神; "body spirits/gods") are Daoist terms for deities inhabiting various parts of the body, including "the five viscera: heart, liver, spleen, lungs, and kidneys" (五臟; wǔzàng), "the six receptacles: gall bladder, stomach, large intestine, small intestine, triple burner, and bladder" (六腑; liùfǔ), and "the seven apertures in the human head: eyes, ears, nostrils, and mouth" (七竅; qīqiào).

These "body residents" were either health threats or health protectors, and said to engage in constant struggles with one another. The upper, middle, and lower dantian energy-centers contained both the Three Corpses/Worms and the counterpart guardian gods called the sanyi (三一; "Three Ones"). When the Three Corpses approach spirits within the body, they can shapeshift, sometimes appearing as evil demons and sometimes taking human form.

The ancient Chinese believed in soul dualism between the hun and po souls: heavenly hún (魂; "spiritual, ethereal, yang soul") that leaves the body after death and the earthly pò (魄; "corporeal, substantive, yin soul") that remains with the corpse of the deceased. In some Daoist traditions, the body was thought to contain three hun and seven po souls. The good hun-souls are clad in red and carry a red seal in their hands, the bad po-souls, "who long for the body to die and therefore perform mischief to try to hasten the adept's demise", are clad in black and carry black seals. Strickmann says the Three Corpses/Worms represent a specialized development of the po-souls' destructive propensities.

But unlike the hun, whose nature (though flighty and inconstant) is entirely benign and whose tendencies are all heavenward, the seven p'o yearn for the earth. Their strongest wish is to rejoin the damp, dank underground springs whose moist, heavy nature they share, and so they seek to undermine and rid themselves of the constraining human body they inhabit. Thus at night, while their host is sleeping (and the airborne hun-souls are sporting and gambling with the hun of other sleepers, thereby causing dreams), the p'o beckon to passing phantoms and disease-demons and invite them in to take possession of the sleeper’s body and work toward his destruction. The very names of the seven p'o-souls suggest their harmful function, and one early list significantly begins with a corpse: corpse-dog, hidden dung, sparrow-sex, greedy-guts, flying venom, filth-for-removal, and rot-lung.

Daoists were fascinated with correlations between the human body and the cosmos. Maspero says, "Man and world, for the Chinese, are absolutely identical, not only as a whole but also in every detail." For examples, the human head is round like heaven, the feet are square like the earth; the Five Viscera correspond to the Five Phases, the 24 vertebra to the 24 solar terms, the 365 acupoints to the 365 days of the year; and the veins and arteries compare to rivers and streams.

Later texts like the Neijing Tu and Xiuzhen Tu depict the "inner landscape" of the human body as a microcosm of the universe, which helps neidan mediators visualize their personal internal spirits. While body gods travel in and out of the body, their prolonged exit may result in sickness or death. Hence, detailed visualizations of the corpse-worms within the meditator's body is a powerful means of keeping them in place and thus promoting health and longevity.

== Classical descriptions ==
The received canon of Chinese classics first mentioned the Three Corpses and Three Worms in the Han dynasty period (206 BCE – 220 CE). Beginning in the Jin dynasty (266–420), Daoist texts portrayed them in both zoomorphic and bureaucratic metaphors. According to Isabelle, the Three Worms or Corpses are well known by all of the Daoist schools; for instance, they are mentioned in early Shangqing School texts such as the Huangting jing (黃庭經; "Scripture of the Yellow Court") and Dadong zhenjing (大洞真經; "Authentic Scripture of the Great Cavern"). The Three Corpses are among the most widely‑documented body parasites in early and medieval Chinese literature.

=== Liexian zhuan ===
Liu Xiang's (c. late 1st century BCE) Daoist hagiography Liexian Zhuan "Biographies of Exemplary Immortals" first records the Three Corpses in the biography of Zhu Huang (朱璜). His Daoist master Ruan Qiu (阮丘) expelled the Three Corpses from Zhu Huang by means of a prescription combining seven drugs, administered nine times daily, over a period of a hundred days. It also quotes the Huangtingjing that for genghsen days, "Do not sleep either day or night, and you shall become immortal."

=== Lunheng ===
Wang Chong's (c. 80 CE) Lunheng compares the sanchong to zhì (蛭; "leeches") (also written with insect radical 虫 generally used for characters naming insects, worms, spiders, and smaller reptiles). Wang censures critics who metaphorically describe corrupt officials as worms or parasites, "Man has three worms in his intestines" (人腹中有三蟲). "The worms living in low marshes are called leeches. They eat man’s feet, as the three worms eat his bowels" (蛭食人足，三蟲食腸). To whom will these critics, so fond of similarities, compare the three worms?" In another Lunheng section, Wang Chong mentions ancient exorcisms of "flying corpses and floating goblins" (飛尸流凶).

=== Baopuzi ===
The "Inner Chapters" of the (c. 320 CE) Baopuzi, written by the Jin Dynasty Daoist scholar Ge Hong, is the earliest source of detailed information about the Three Corpses. This text describes the sanshi parasites causing illnesses during unlucky times in the Chinese calendar and reporting sins on gengshen days, as well as gives several methods for preparing poisonous waidan alchemical elixirs to eliminate the Three Corpses.

The Baopuzi records how the Three Corpses and Zaoshen (竈神; "God of the Stove") make regular reports to Siming (司命; "Director of Destinies"), who shortens the host's lifespan accordingly. Answering a question about the importance of jìnjì (禁忌; "taboo"), Ge Hong cites three apocryphal Han texts, the Yineijie (易內戒; "Inner Commands of the Book of Changes"), Chisongzijing (赤鬆子經; "Classic of Master Redpine"), and Hetu jimingfu (河圖記命符; "River Chart Life Talisman"), which is attributed to the Han Daoist Lezichang 樂子長.

Taboos are most urgent for avoiding harm and losses. Inner Commands of the Book of Changes, Ch'ih-sung tzu's Classic, and The Life-dealing Amulets of the Ho-t'u-chi are unanimous in saying that the gods of heaven and earth who are in charge of misdeeds make deductions from people's three-day reckonings according to the degree of their wrongdoing. As these reckonings decrease, a man becomes poorer and falls ill; frequently he suffers anxiety. When no more are left, he dies. Since there are hundreds of things that may give rise to deductions, I cannot give a complete account. It is also said that there are Three Corpses [三尸] in our bodies, which, though not corporeal, actually are of a type with our inner, ethereal breaths, the powers, the ghosts, and the gods [魂靈鬼神之屬也]. They want us to die prematurely. (After death they become a man's ghost and move about at will to where sacrifices and libations are being offered.) Therefore, every fifty-seventh day of the sixty-day cycle they mount to heaven and personally report our misdeeds to the Director of Fates. Further, during the night of the last day of the month the hearth god also ascends to heaven and makes an oral report of a man's wrongs. For the more important misdeeds [紀; ji; "12 year period; discipline; mark"] a whole period of three hundred days is deducted. For the minor ones they deduct one reckoning [算; suan; "calculate; count"], a reckoning being three days. Personally, I have not yet been able to determine whether this is really so or not, but that is because the ways of heaven are obscure, and ghosts and gods are hard to understand. (6)

Compare Campany's translation, "As for the sort of beings they are, they have no physical forms but are nevertheless real, of a type with our cloud-souls and numina, ghosts and spirits (魂靈鬼神; hunling guishen)". Among present-day Quanzhen School Daoists in Chengdu, Arthur says they remain awake in meditation all night on each new moon to effectively hinder the Three Worms' damning travels. "The idea here is that if adepts successfully hinder the Deathbringers' travels for seven consecutive gengshen nights, the Director of Destiny will fire these supernatural entities from their appointed positions, and they will die."

Another germane Baopuzi passage explains how the Three Corpses take advantage of shuaiyue weiri (衰月危日; "months of weakness and days of peril"), which is a technical term for cyclical times of special vulnerability. Ge Hong says even someone with xindao zhi xin (信道之心; "a heart believing in the Dao") must expel the Three Corpses.

If all you have is a heart faithful to God and yet do nothing for your own benefit – your predestined life span being defective and your body threatened with harm – the Three Corpses will take advantage of your weak months and perilous days [三尸因其衰月危日], the hours when your longevity could be interrupted or sickness incurred, to summon vicious breaths and bring in any demons they might be able to find to do you injury. (15)

The Baopuzi uses sanchong (三蟲; "Three Worms") to mean sanshi (三尸; "Three Corpses"), and mentions both jiuchong (九蟲; "Nine Worms") (or "Nine Vermin"), internal parasites, and the all-encompassing sanshi jiuchong "Three Corpses and Nine Worms".

Sanchong "Three Worms" synonymously means "Three Corpses", and the Baopuzi says both can be expelled through cinnabar-based alchemical elixirs. The first method of Xianmenzi (羡門子) expels the corpse-worms, provides immortality, and exorcises ghosts.

... mixes three quarts of wine with a pound of cinnabar and exposes it to the sun for forty days. After it has been taken for one day the Three Worms and all illnesses are immediately purged from the patient [三蟲百病立下]. If taken for three years, it will confer geniehood and one is sure to be served by two fairies, who can be employed to summon the Traveling Canteen. This elixir can exorcize ghosts. When the unburied dead everywhere are possessing people and harming them, inflicting injuries upon our homes, and throwing up earthworks to obstruct people, no harm will come to us if this elixir is hung pointed toward the sources of disaster. (4)

The second method of Wu Chengzi (務成子) expels the Three Worms, works miracles, and provides virtual immortality. The complex instructions involve melting mercury and lead in a special crucible – made from heating realgar, earthworm excreta, and cinnabar inside iron and copper tubes – in order to produce 1500 pounds of gold.

After soaking for a hundred days in Vitex or red panicled millet wine, this gold softens sufficiently to be miscible with other things. If one pill of it the size of a gram is taken three times daily until one pound has been consumed, the Three Worms will cry for mercy and all illnesses will quit the body [三蟲伏尸百病皆去]. The blind will see; the deaf, hear; the aged will become like thirty; those entering fire will not be burned; all evils, all poisons, cold, wind, heat, and dampness—none of these will be able to attack such a man. If he continues the dosage until three pounds have been consumed, he will be able to walk on rivers and all the gods of the mountains and streams will come to serve and protect him. His lot of longevity will last as long as all nature. (16)

Jiuchong "Nine Worms" broadly means "internal worms and parasites" in the Baopuzi, for instance, (5), "Eulalia and male fern are vermifuges" [萑蘆貫衆之煞九蟲]. Ge Hong says that medicinal lacquer, instead of mercury, will eliminate the Nine Worms.

If pure, unadulterated lacquer is taken, it will put a man in communication with the gods and let him enjoy Fullness of Life. Directions: Mix it with ten pieces of crab. Take it with mica water, or mixed with jade water. The Nine Insects will then drop from you, and the bad blood will leave you through nose-bleeds [九蟲悉下惡血從鼻去]. After a year, the six-chia gods and the Traveling Canteen will come to you. (11)

Sanshi jiuchong "Three Corpses and Nine Worms" is a generic name for "bodily parasites". They can be eliminated with an elixir called shendan (神丹; "Divine Cinnabar") or shenfu (神符; "Divine Amulet").

Take it for one hundred days and you will be a genie. To cross streams or pass through fire, smear the soles of your feet with it and you will be able to walk on water. After taking only three spatulas of it you will see that the Three Corpses and the Nine Worms in your body will disappear, and all your illnesses will be cured [三尸九虫皆即消壞百病皆愈也]. (4)

Cinnabar, the reddish ore of mercury, is the essential ingredient in many Daoist magical elixirs that expel corpse-worms, most of which (including those above attributed to Xianmenzi, Wu Chengzi, and Shendan) are also said to cure bǎibìng (百病). Ge Hong gives the Recipe for Nibbling Melted Gold attributed to Liangyizi 兩儀子 (4), which involves alternately dipping gold 100 times into boiling hog fat and vinegar, and concludes, "If you wish to take medicine that will banish [the Three Corpses] from your body, you must take cinnabar." For example, the xiaodan (小丹; "Lesser Elixir"),

Take one pound of cinnabar, pestled and sifted, three quarts of strong vinegar, and two quarts of lacquer. Mix these three thoroughly, and cook over a slow fire until the compound can be shaped into pills. Take three, the size of a hempseed, twice daily for thirty days, and all abdominal illnesses will be cured, and the Three Corpses that are in your body will depart [腹中百病愈三尸去]. Take for one hundred days, and your flesh and bones will become strong and sturdy. Take for one thousand days, and the Governor of Fates will strike your name from the Book of Death; you will last as long as all nature, and the sun and moon will always shine on you. You can change shape continuously. You will cast no shadow in the sun, for you will radiate your own light. (4)

Lastly, a Baopuzi discussion about avoiding illnesses uses what commentators gloss as a variant name for the sanshi Three Corpses: sānshǐ (三使; "Three Envoys [of Death]"), with shǐ ("send (an envoy); make; cause").

The minor elixirs for recalling a man's ethereal breaths, the pills for countering the three Messenger-corpses [召魂小丹三使之丸], and lesser medicines made from the Five Brilliances and the Eight Minerals will sometimes melt hard ice instantly or keep one afloat in water. They can intercept ghosts and gods, lay tigers and leopards, and disperse accumulations in the digestive system and our organs. They dislodge the two lackeys of illness from the heart region and the diaphragm (Tso, Ch'eng 10.5); they raise those who have just died; return frightened ethereal breaths to the body they had quit. All these are common, everyday medicines. And, if they can still restore the dead to life, why should the superior medicines not be able to make the living immortal? (5)

This refers to the Zuozhuan recording that after Duke Jing of Jin dreamed about being cursed with two boyish disease-demons hiding in his body, he fell into a latrine and died in 581 BCE.

=== Shenxian zhuan ===
Ge Hong's (c. 3rd–4th century) Shenxian zhuan Daoist hagiography of Liu Gen 劉根 quotes instructions passed from legendary Qin dynasty xian Han Zhong, which explain how the Three Corpses can cause nightmares.

If you desire long life, the first thing you must do is to expel the three corpses. Once the three corpses are expelled, you must fix your aim and your thought, eliminating sensual desires. I [Liu Gen] then received [from Han Zhong the scripture] Divine Methods in Five Sections (Shenfang wupian 神方五篇) [for this purpose]. It says: "The ambushing corpses always ascend to Heaven to report on people's sins on the first, fifteenth, and last days of each month. The Director of Allotted Life Spans (Siming 司命) deducts from people's accounts and shortens their life spans accordingly. The gods within people's bodies want to make people live, but the corpses want to make them die. When people die, their gods disperse; the corpses, once in this bodiless state, become ghosts, and when people sacrifice to [the dead] these ghosts obtain the offering foods. This is why the corpses want people to die. When you dream of fighting with an evil person, this is [caused by] the corpses and the gods at war [inside you]." So I followed his [or the scripture's?] instructions, synthesized [the elixir] and ingested it, and thereby attained transcendence.

The (c. 1029) Yunji Qiqian Daoist anthology also describes internal gods and the Three Corpses fighting within the human body, "When in dreams one finds oneself fighting with wicked men, this is the Corpses struggling with the Spirits."

Nightmares were also a significant side-effect of expelling the Three Corpses through bigu fasting and poisonous elixirs.

The corpse-demons may manifest themselves in the ascetic’s dreams in the guise of three men garbed in rather old-fashioned costumes. As the program of anti-corpse treatment gets underway and the drugs begin to take effect, the adept will dream that his father or mother has died, or that his wife and children have been murdered. Or else the victims will be his sisters or brothers, or a woman, or he will dream that a grave has been destroyed and the coffin has vanished, or else that he is undergoing the five types of mutilating punishment. All these are said to be indications that the corpse-demons are about to be destroyed.

=== Zhouhou beiji fang ===
The Zhouhou beiji fang (肘后备急方; "Handbook of Prescriptions for Emergencies"), which is also attributed to Ge Hong but contains later emendations, lists the wǔshī (五尸; "Five Corpses")—external corpse-demons that enter the body at the invitation of the Three Corpses.

- The fēishī (飛尸; "flying corpse"), which "roam about a person’s skin and bore through to his inner organs. Their action is manifested in intermittent stabbing pains."
- The dùnshī (遁尸; "reclusive corpse"), which "attaches itself to your bones and so enters your flesh from within. It then burrows into the veins and arteries of your blood; its symptoms break out when it beholds a funeral or hears the sound of wailing."
- The fēngshī (風尸; "wind corpse"), which "course exuberantly through all four limbs until you are unable to say where exactly the pain is situated. They lead to dizziness and loss of consciousness, and their outbreaks are provoked by wind and snow."
- The chénshī (沉尸; "sinking corpse"), which "enwraps the vital organs and strikes against the heart and ribs, causing a knotting, slicing sensation there; this happens whenever it encounters cold."
- The shīzhù (尸疰; "corpse-infusion" or "corpse-infestation"), which "is the dire culmination of the series. The victim feels that his entire body is sunken and weighted down, his vital spirits are in confusion, he is constantly oppressed by feelings of dullness and exhaustion, and the vital breaths are shifting and changing in his body’s every joint." (1).

=== Ziyang zhenren neizhuan ===
The (4th century CE) Ziyang zhenren neizhuan (紫陽真人內傳; "Inner Biography of the True Person of Purple Yang") described the appearance of the Three Corpses and how to eliminate them. Ziyang zhenren is the honorific name of the legendary Daoist xian Zhou Yishan (周義山, b. 80 BCE), who supposedly bestowed the Shangqing revelations on Yang Xi (楊羲, 330-c. 386). According to Zhou's biography, he learned alchemical and dietetic recipes to expel the Three Corpses from his master Su Lin (素林), who had learned them from his masters Qin Gao (琴高) and Qiusheng (生仇).

- Qīnggǔ (青古; "Old Blue") dwells in the Muddy Pellet Palace within the Upper Dantian, "It is he who makes men blind, or deaf, or bald, who makes the teeth fall out, who stops up the nose and gives bad breath."
- Bái gū (白姑; "White Maiden") dwells in the Crimson Palace within the Middle Field, "She causes palpitations of the heart, asthma, and melancholy."
- Xuè shī (血尸; "Bloody Corpse") dwells in the Lower Dantian, "It is through him that the intestines are painfully twisted, that the bones are dried out, that the skin withers, that the limbs have rheumatisms..."

This Shangqing text records a widely quoted recipe, attributed to Zhou Yishan, for killing the Three Worms/Corpses. It combines 7 drugs: 7/10 of a bushel of hemp-seeds, 7 ounces of Smilax, 6 ounces of Rehmannia glutinosa, 5 ounces of aconite, 5 ounces of cloud-shaped agaric mushrooms, 4 ounces of cinnamon, and a 7-inch long Zanthoxylum root. Then, one boils a root of Acorus calamus in 1 1/2 bushels of wine to produce pure essential liquor.

Soak the seven drugs in this, then decant the mixture into a vase; but that will still not do. After leaving the drugs to macerate for three nights, take them out and put them in the sun to dry out. (Then) again take the aforesaid liquor and steep (the seven drugs) in it for three nights. Once more draw off (the wine) from them and put them in the sun (and continue this alternative steeping in the wine and drying them) until the wine is exhausted; then stop putting them out to dry. Pound them in an iron mortar and put them through a fine sieve to reduce them to powder. Then take white honey and mix the powder with it for making pills. In the morning, facing East, roll two pills the size of a small pea; then increase this by one pill (each day) to ten or more. This regimen cures third-degree fever within the belly, it truly makes the breath rise up in such a way that the heart and breast are freed of all obstruction, coagulates the flesh and skin, makes the body light and produces a halo around it. When a whole dose has been taken, the cereal Worms die; when the Worms are dead the Corpses dry out; when they are dry, they drop down by themselves. This has to be done several times, not restricting oneself to a single dose.

=== Taishang Lingbao wufuxu ===
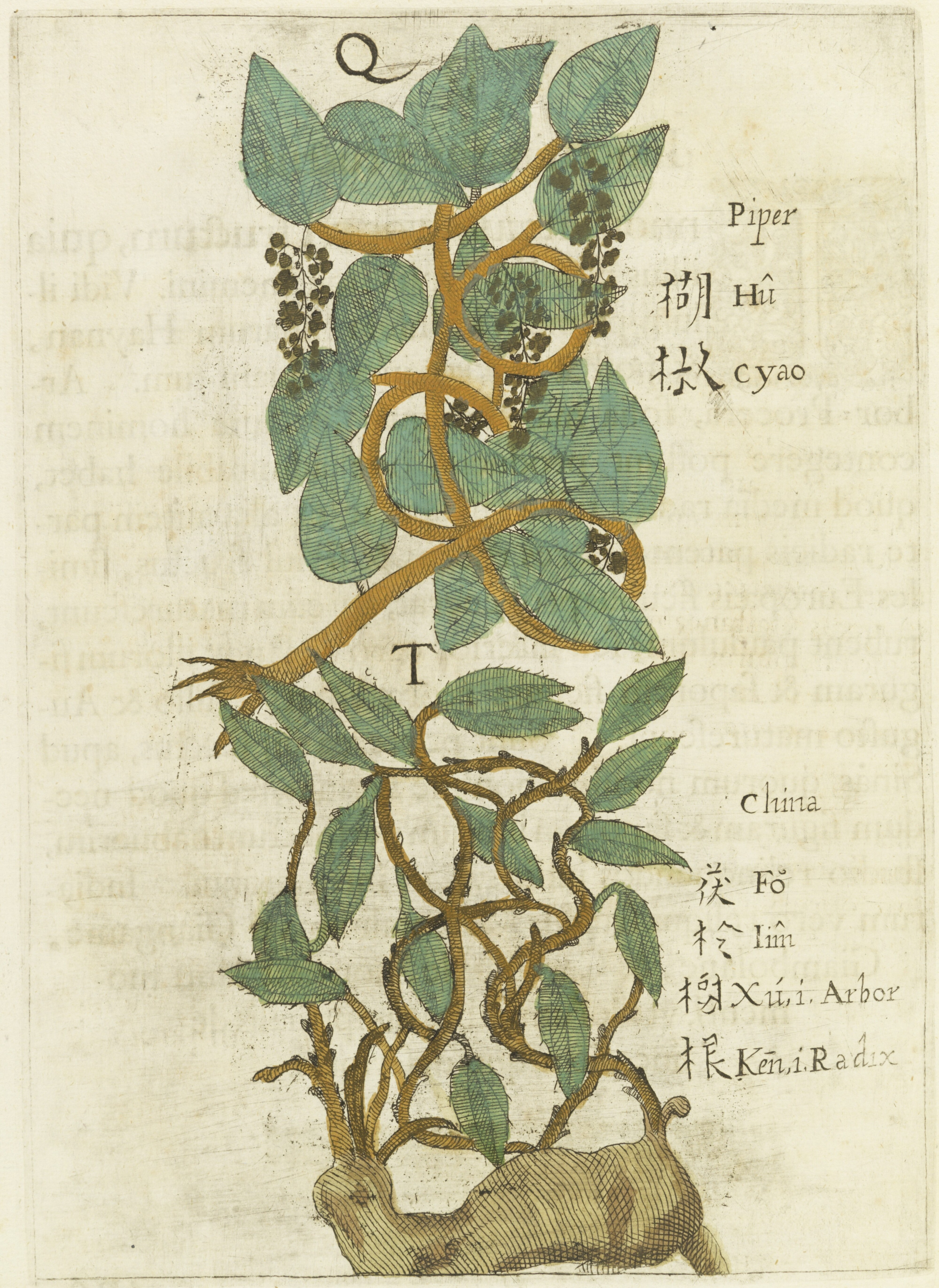
Illustration of hújiāo (胡椒; "Piper nigrum, black pepper") and fúlíng (茯苓; "Wolfiporia extensa, China-root fungus"), from Michael Boym's (1656) Flora Sinensis.

The (c. 400 CE) Taishang Lingbao wufuxu (太上靈寶五符序; "Explanations of the Five Numinous Treasure Talismans") or Wufuxu, compiled by the Lingbao School founder Ge Chaofu, describes various techniques for expelling the Three Corpses/Worms.

The Wufuxu uses both sanchong "Three Worms" and fushi "Concealed Corpses" as interchangeable names for the malevolent beings residing in the human body, interpreted as either the reconciliation of regional varieties of Chinese names or the conflation of common names with religious terms. Among the 11 Wufuxu recipes for expelling corpse-worms, 6 mention sanchong fushi (三蟲伏尸) integrating two previously separate names for similar ideas, which allows the text to address both readers familiar with the Three Worms concept as well as those who knew of the Concealed, or Three, Corpses. "The Immortal's Method for Expelling the Three Worms and Concealed Corpses" explicates the worm/corpse synonymy: "[T]he Concealed Corpses which live in people's abdomens limit the powers of medicines. [ ... ] This is all caused by the Three Worms. [ ... ] Simple commoners laugh at these things; therefore after people die they become 'Corpse' bones. This is the nickname of the Three Worms."

Among Wufuxu prescriptions for eliminating the Three Worms/Corpses, the primary anthelmintic herbs are: shānglù (商陸; "Phytolacca rivinoides, pokeweed") root, tiānméndōng (天門冬; "Asparagus cochinchinensis, asparagus") root, huángjīng (黄精; "Polygonatum sibiricum, Solomon's seal"), and fúlíng (茯苓; "Wolfiporia extensa, China-root fungus") (often misidentified as Smilax glabra, sarsaparilla"). Pokeweed—which the Wufuxu says is effective alone or in combination with other medicinal herbs—is poisonous for humans, with the highest toxicity in the roots, yet it has been used in folk medicine as a purgative, emetic, diuretic, and hunger suppressant. Pokeweed root, asparagus root, and Solomon's seal all contain chemical compounds called saponins, which are poisons that irritate the gastric mucosa and thus can dislodge any intestinal parasites.

"The Immortal's Method for Expelling the Three Worms and Concealed Corpses" (mentioned above) claims taking pokeweed root pills will make the Three Worms decompose and come out in the host's feces. The instructions say to mix pokeweed, China-root fungus, alcohol, wheat flour, and yeast, and to seal this in an earthenware jar for 20 days. Once fermented, the adept mixes this with boiled beans in order to make large pills the size of chicken egg yolks.

Daily ingest three pills for thirty days in order to expel [the Three Worms] and to gain a few benefits. The Upper Deathbringer [takes] one hundred days. The Middle Deathbringer [takes] sixty days. The Lower Deathbringer [takes] thirty days. [As they leave,] rotten smells will emerge: the Upper Deathbringer will smell like animal hair, the Middle Deathbringer will smell like feet, and the Lower Deathbringer will smell like a [rotten] chicken egg. The Upper Deathbringer will be black, the Middle Deathbringer will be dark blue-green (qing 青), and the Lower Deathbringer will be white.

The context concludes that once the Three Worms are removed, the adept "never again feels hungry nor thirsty, and his heart is calm and free of thoughts".

The Taishang Lingbao wufuxu cites Ge Hong that his great-uncle Ge Xuan transmitted a recipe containing Solomon's-seal, and said that "all the various ways to cultivate long life must begin with expelling the Three Worms and flushing out the Concealed Corpses".

While most Wufuxu methods for expelling the Three Worms involve anthelmintic herbs, a few do not. For instance, a recipe attributed to the Han Daoist Lezichang 樂子長 says, "Pluck peach leaves on the third day of the third month; crush them to extract seven pints of juice. Then mix in liquor and heat it five or six times. Take it before meals and the three worms will be driven out." One anomalous Wufuxu method does not mention either medicinal herbs or diet. "The Recipe of Master Redpine" says, "When you cut the nails of your hands and feet on the sixteenth day of the seventh month, you can drive out the three worms from your intestines." Arthur reasons that cutting one's nails for cleanliness might help a person to avoid future parasite infestations but not existing ones, perhaps Master Redpine was referring to the Ghost Festival that is held on the full moon of the seventh lunar month.

=== Book of the Later Han ===
The 5th-century Book of the Later Han mentions removing the Three Worms twice in the Biographies of Fangshi section (82B). The biography of the acupuncturist A Shan 阿善 says he lived to an age of over 100 years using the method of Hua Tuo, a famous physician who introduced surgical anesthesia, to remove the Three Worms. This prescription uses green leaves from a lacquer tree, which taken continuously will remove the Three Worms, benefit the internal organs, lighten the body, and prevent hair from turning white [言久服去三蟲利五藏輕體使人頭不白].

The biography of Fei Changfang tells how he met the Daoist xian Xie Yuanyi 謝元一 who offered to teach him the Way.

Fei Changfang then followed the old man deep into the mountains. Penetrating into dense underbrush, they found themselves in the midst of a group of tigers, and the old man left Fei alone there, but he was not afraid. Then they reclined in a chamber in which a thousand-catty stone hung by a single length of old twine directly over Fei's heart. A mass of snakes appeared and gnawed on the twine till it was about to be severed, but Fei did not budge. The old man then returned, patted him and said "You're teachable!" Then the old man directed him to eat a pile of terribly foul-smelling excrement full of the three worms in it [糞中有三蟲], but Fei thought it too despicable. The old man then said, "You almost attained the Way, but unfortunately you have failed to complete it at this point. What a pity!" (82)

=== Zhen'gao ===
The late 5th-century text Zhen'gao is a collection of Shangqing materials edited by Tao Hongjing (456–536) as part of the Shangqing canon, based upon the notes of Yang Xi (330–386) and his patrons Xu Mai 許邁 (300–348) and Xu Mi 許謐 (303–376).

Nü xianren Liu Gang qi koujue (女仙人劉綱妻口訣; "The Oral Lesson of the Female Immortal, the wife of Liu Gang") explains how the Three Corpses in the bodies of men and women lust and mingle with each other, regardless of their conscious intentions.

Those who seek immortality must not associate with women. On the ninth day of the third month, the second day of the sixth month, the sixth day of the ninth month, and the third day of the twelfth month, [they] should remain in their rooms and make sure not to look at women. If the Six Corpses (the Three Corpses of the adept himself and of the woman that he looks at?) cause chaos, the blood in your viscera will be disturbed and aroused, your three hun souls will be unguarded. Your spirit will weaken and your qi will leave. All of these [factors] will accumulate, and bring about death. As for why you avoid [women] on these days, it is not only to block off lasciviousness. It is [also] to pacify the female palaces. The female palaces are in the shen and the male palaces are in the yin. Yin and shen punish each other. Both execute each other. On these days the Three Corpses of men and women come out from the pupils of the eyes. Female Corpses beckon the male, and male Corpses beckon the female. Misfortune and harm pass back and forth, making the spirit perish and thus blemishing your rectitude. Even if a person does not notice it, his body is exposed and has already been harmed because the Three Corpses fight within the eyes, while blood is shed within the Niwan (a compartment in the brain). On these days, even if it is a girl who you are extremely fond of, or a wife of a close friend, you absolutely must not look them face to face. My predecessor and teacher became an Immortal by simply practicing this method. The [prescription] does not apply to [your] closest of relatives to whom you have no thoughts [of sexual attraction].

=== Chu sanshi jiuchong baoshengjing ===
The (c. 9th century) Chu sanshi jiuchong baoshengjing (除三尸九蟲保生經; "Scripture on Expelling the Three Corpses and Nine Worms to Protect Life") contains illustrations and comprehensive discussions of the various corpse-worms, and gives methods for expelling them from the body. The text likely originated in the Sichuan region, and its original illustrations were attributed to a student of the famous Tang doctor Sun Simiao (581–682 CE).

The Baoshengjing gives the Chinese names of the death-hastening Three Corpse brothers, who share the Peng (surname) 彭 "sound of a drum; strength"—compare the God of Longevity named Peng Zu 彭祖.

- The Upper Corpse, Péng Jū 彭琚 [...] lives in the upper part of the head and attacks people's Niwan Dantian 泥丸丹田 [the upper energy locus in the center of the head where Daoists claim many of the corporeal deities reside]. It makes peoples' heads heavy, eyes blur with cold tears, noses fill with green mucus, ears deaf, teeth fall out, [...] and faces wrinkle. It causes good people, wealthy people, and rebellious people all to be regarded as evil and dirty.
- The Middle Corpse, Péng Zhì 彭瓚 [...] is good at corrupting the five flavors, and it desires the five colors. It resides in the heart and stomach. It attacks the Red Palace [the middle energy locus at the level of the heart] and burns the inside. It causes peoples' hearts to be confused and always forgetful. With very little supportive qi, [people] become exhausted and subsequently fall over, see wild things, become depressed, and become dehydrated. It will make the mouth dry and the eyes white [indicating cataracts and blindness], and it will chisel at peoples' teeth. Day and night it tries to subdue and destroy its host. All of one's organs will become diseased.
- The Lower Corpse, Péng Jiǎo 彭矯 [...] lives in peoples' stomachs and legs. It attacks peoples' lower extremities and injures and disperses the Ocean of Qi (氣海) [the lower energy storage field located three finger-widths below the navel]. It causes people to develop the hundred illnesses, to begin thinking injurious and rebellious thoughts, to desire women, to be daring and zealous, to become addicted to lust, to be offensive, to wantonly destroy things, and to be unable to control themselves.

This text's woodblock illustrations depict the Upper Corpse as a male scholar or corrupt court official, the Middle as a short quadruped resembling a Chinese guardian lion, and the Lower Corpse as "a monster that looks like a horse's leg with a horned human head"

The text differentiates the mythological Three Corpses from the intestinal jiǔchóng (九蟲; "Nine Worms"), which seem to be based on observations of harmful parasites such as roundworms or tapeworms. The text explains that the Nine Worms are the physical counterparts of and acting agents for the Three Corpses. They are:

- "The ambush worm" (伏蟲; fuchong) saps people's strength by feeding off their essence and blood.
- "The coiling worm [now meaning "roundworm"]" (蛔蟲; huichong) infests the body in pairs of male and female that live above and below the heart, consuming their host's blood.
- "The inch-long white worm" (寸白蟲; cun baichong) chews into the stomach, weakening the inner organs and damaging the digestive tract.
- "The flesh worm" (肉蟲; rouchong) causes itching and weakens the sinews and back.
- "The lung worm" (肺蟲; feichong) causes coughing, phlegm buildup, and difficulty in breathing.
- "The stomach worm" (胃蟲; weichong) consumes food from its host's stomach, causing hunger.
- "The obstructing [or "diaphragm"] worm" (膈蟲; gechong) dulls the senses, induces drowsiness, and causes nightmares.
- "The red worm" (赤蟲; chichong) causes stagnation of the blood and pneuma, heaviness in the waist, and ringing in the ears.
- "The wriggling worm" (蹺蟲; qiaochong) causes itching sores on the skin and tooth decay.

The Baoshengjing describes the sanhun (三魂; "Three hun-souls") in the human body and how to meditate on them.

The three spirit souls are located beneath the liver. They look like human beings and wear green robes with yellow inner garments. Every month on the third, thirteenth, and twenty-third, they leave the body at night to go wandering about. At this time, lie down with your feet up, your head supported by a pillow, and your legs stretched out straight. Fold your hands over your heart, close your eyes, and hold your breath. Clap your teeth three times. Now visualize a red energy in your heart about the size of an egg. It emerges from the heart and rises into the throat, from where it spreads a wondrous radiance that envelopes your entire body to grow into a glowing fire all around it. You should feel the body getting quite warm. At that point, call out their names: "Spirit Guidance—come to succor me! Inner Radiance—come to nurture me! Dark Essence—come to protect my life! Swiftly, swiftly, in accordance with the statutes and ordinances!" (1, 7)

The text also describes countless weichong (微蟲; "micro organic worms"), which resemble caizi (菜子; "vegetable seeds"), residing on the surface of the body.

=== Zhonghuang jing ===
The 9th-century Quanzhen School text Zhonghuang jing (中皇經; "Classic of the Yellow Center") describes how an arduous bigu fasting regimen can result in weakness, loss of weight, yellowish complexion, and problems with the Three Worms.

When the adept first begins to fast, the air he swallows does not penetrate sufficiently, and he is constantly subjected to the mischief of the Three Worms. This causes frequent moods of depression and anxiety. He also becomes easily tempted to indulge in sensual or culinary pleasures. He must therefore make a constant effort to resist and overcome these woes and temptations. Quoting a certain Taishang shengxuan jing, the commentary explains that the fast is a process during which the Three Worms are successively exterminated; the Upper Worm dies after thirty days, the Middle Worm dies after sixty days, and the Lower Worm dies after ninety days. After 100 days, the adept's body becomes healthy and strong, and his mind becomes "pure." He is no longer in danger of falling prey to his desires. When this stage is reached, the adept can see the "Five Sprouts," or the qi of his five viscera, which also are described as the "proper qi of the five agents."

== Origins ==
Scholars are unclear as to when the Three Corpse-Worms concept was first developed, and the best estimates are during the Western Han dynasty (206 BCE – 9 CE).

Arthur outlines the historical changes from the Three Worms as intestinal parasites to the Three Corpses as sin-reporting officials in the celestial bureaucracy. In one of the earliest discussions, the (1st century CE) Lunheng envisioned the Three Worms as actual parasites that gnaw through the human intestines in the way that leeches gnaw through the feet. Later 3rd and 4th century Daoist texts such as the Baopuzi renamed the Three Worms as the Three Corpses, developed ideas about religious characteristics of these parasites, and retooled them into "supernatural beings with physical and ephemeral spirit components that are capable of exerting directed efforts to hasten the body's death."

Converging evidence from textual records and parasite physiology support the hypothesis that the Three Worms/Corpses concept originated over 2000 years ago.

Toshiaki Yamada suggests that the Three Worms originated during the 1st–2nd century BCE early Han period. Both the Baopuzi and Wufuxu cite worm-expelling techniques from apocryphal Han texts associated with Chisongzi "Master Redpine" and Lezichang. These two semi-historical Daoist masters are frequently mentioned in connection with Emperor Wu of Han (r. 141–87 BCE), who wanted to become a Daoist immortal and employed numerous Taoist priests and fangshi.

Some scholars hypothesize that the Three Worms may have originated from the observation of parasites in human excrement. Campany interprets the Hou Hanshu story about Master Xie Yuanyi telling Fei Changfang that he would never become a xian-immortal because he refused to eat "terribly foul-smelling excrement full of the three worms", figuratively denoting the prerequisite of expelling the Three Worms from his body. Arthur observes that, "Likely evidence for these worms was plentiful in people's feces, especially those of starving people, because many intestinal worms will evacuate the digestive system if they are not able to ingest enough sustenance. Otherwise, when intestinal parasites grow large, portions of them will break off and be evacuated with the feces, thus providing additional tangible evidence of their existence."

== Japanese Kōshin ==
The Japanese folk tradition of Kōshin (namely, the Sino-Japanese pronunciation of gengshen 庚申 "57th of the 60-day cycle") combines the Daoist Three Corpses with Shintō and Buddhist beliefs, including the Three Wise Monkeys. People attend Kōshin-Machi 庚申待 "57th Day Waiting" events to stay awake all night and prevent the Three Corpses from leaving the body and reporting misdeeds to heaven.

== See also ==
- Chinese alchemical elixir poisoning
