= Xiuzhen =

Xiuzhen may refer to:

- Xiuzhen Tu
- Xiuzhen Cheng
- Lin Xiuzhen (disambiguation)
- Yin Xiuzhen
