= Neijing =

Neijing may refer to:

- Huangdi Neijing, the ancient medical text Inner Canon of the Yellow Emperor
- Neijin, "internal strength" in Chinese martial arts (often misspelled "Neijing")

See also:

- Bian Que, author of the Bian Que Neijing
- Jing (Chinese medicine) (精), a principle in traditional Chinese medicine and Chinese martial arts; sometimes confused with jin (勁; power) as in Neijin.
- Neijing Tu, a diagram of energy pathways in the human body
