= Body god =

Taoist deities believed to live in the body

In Taoism, body gods (Chinese: 身神; pinyin: shēnshén), also inner gods or internal gods (Chinese: 内神; pinyin: nèishén) are deities situated within the human body. As many as 36,000 inner gods are described, "who raise the whole body and let it ascend to Heaven." Often they appear as "bureaucrats reporting to the stars."

== Description ==
The Taoist conception of the body contains a number of "body residents", including gods, hun and po souls, and disease-causing spirits such as the Three Corpses (sanchong, 三蟲). Meditation can allow the adept to control or manage these entities. The 2nd century Taipingjing describes one such method:

There are ten spirits of spring that look like boys dressed in blue; ten spirits of summer that look like boys dressed in red; ten spirits of fall that appear like boys dressed in white; ten spirits of winter that look like boys dressed in black; twelve spirits of the four seasons that seem to be boys dressed in yellow. These are the gods residing in the inner organs of male adepts. The same numbers of gods [in female form] reside in those of a female. Males best meditate on [the gods] in male form, while females envision them in female form. Each should be [painted] about one chi [roughly one foot] tall. [If] the images are nicely painted and lovable, adepts will feel happy and their spirit souls promptly return to the body.

=== Origin ===
Inner gods are among the earliest images in Taoism, but literary sources predate any visual iconography. Body gods can be traced to the social and political upheaval of the declining Han dynasty, where a "process of deification" on the microcosmic level supplanted a notion of organs as impersonal storehouses of qi. The body was therefore transformed into the "dwelling place of powerful internal spirits or gods." The "impersonal entities" seen in earlier texts such as the Huainanzi or Guanzi transitioned to anthropomorphic gods of the body. Anthropomorphism made the visualization of cosmic principles easier and emphasized their "living" or generative functions. The identification of the body with the celestial realm originates in yin-yang cosmology and the wuxing. Meditation "accordingly served to turn the adept’s body into a cosmic body, a 'theater of moving gods.'" The first systematic description of inner gods is found in the Yellow Court Classic, where each organ is designated as a ministry and is managed by a god residing in a palace.

Descriptions of the inner gods in the Yellow Court Classic
Organ	Heart	Lungs	Liver	Kidneys	Spleen	Gallbladder
Name	Cinnabar Origin	Brilliant Flower	Dragon Smoke	Dark Abyss	Constant Existence	Dragon Resplendence
Style	Preserving Numina	Achieving the Void	Holding Light	Raising Children	Resting Place of Spirit	Imposing Brightness

A late 2nd century commentary on the Daodejing, the Master of the Riverbank, contains a description of five spirits inhabiting the liver, lungs, heart, kidney, and spleen. These organs can be emptied of "excessive emotions and desires" to make room for the descent of cosmic deities. The early medieval Laozi zhongjing describes a pantheon of inner gods in a hierarchical arrangement similar to the Eastern Han court, supported by eight-thousand attendants. The Central Scripture describes the lung as a secretary, the liver as a librarian, the heart as a minister of military affairs, the left kidney as a minister of education, and the right kidney as the minister of public works.

=== Taiyi ===
The Taipingjing describes Taiyi (太一 "the one"), initially personified as an astral deity at the center of the universe, as an inner god:

On the head, the One is the top;
Among the seven orifices, it is found in the eyes;
In the center of the body, it is the navel;
Among the five orbs, it is the heart;
Among the members of the body, it is the hands;
Among the bones, it is the spinal column;
In the flesh of the body, it is found in the five orbs and the stomach.

The Sanhuangsanyijing opens with a method for moving Taiyi from the Upper Cinnabar Field to the Middle Cinnabar Field, located in the heart, then to the top of the spleen, and finally between the kidneys and below the navel. Taiyi's integration as an internal god situated a state of cosmic unity within the body.

Ge Hong's Baopuzi elevates Taiyi above all others, prescribing a practice referred to as "guarding the One" (shouyi, 守一). It describes the One as

0.9 inch[es] in length in the male, and 0.6 inch[es] in the female. Sometimes it is in the lower cinnabar field 1.4 inches beneath the navel. At other times it is in the central cinnabar field, i.e., the golden gate or purple palace, in the heart.

== Gallery ==
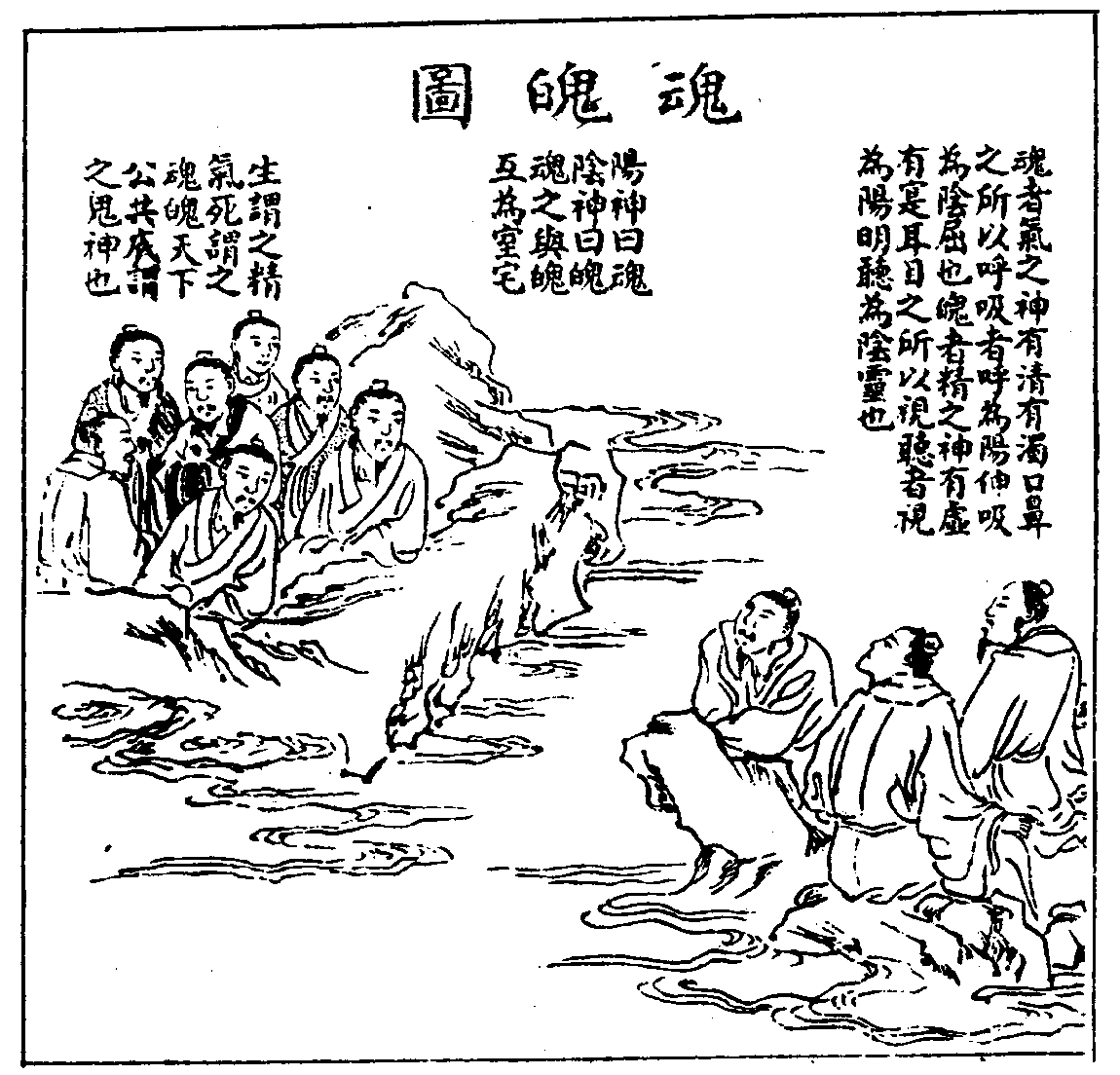
The hun and po souls from the Xingming guizhi

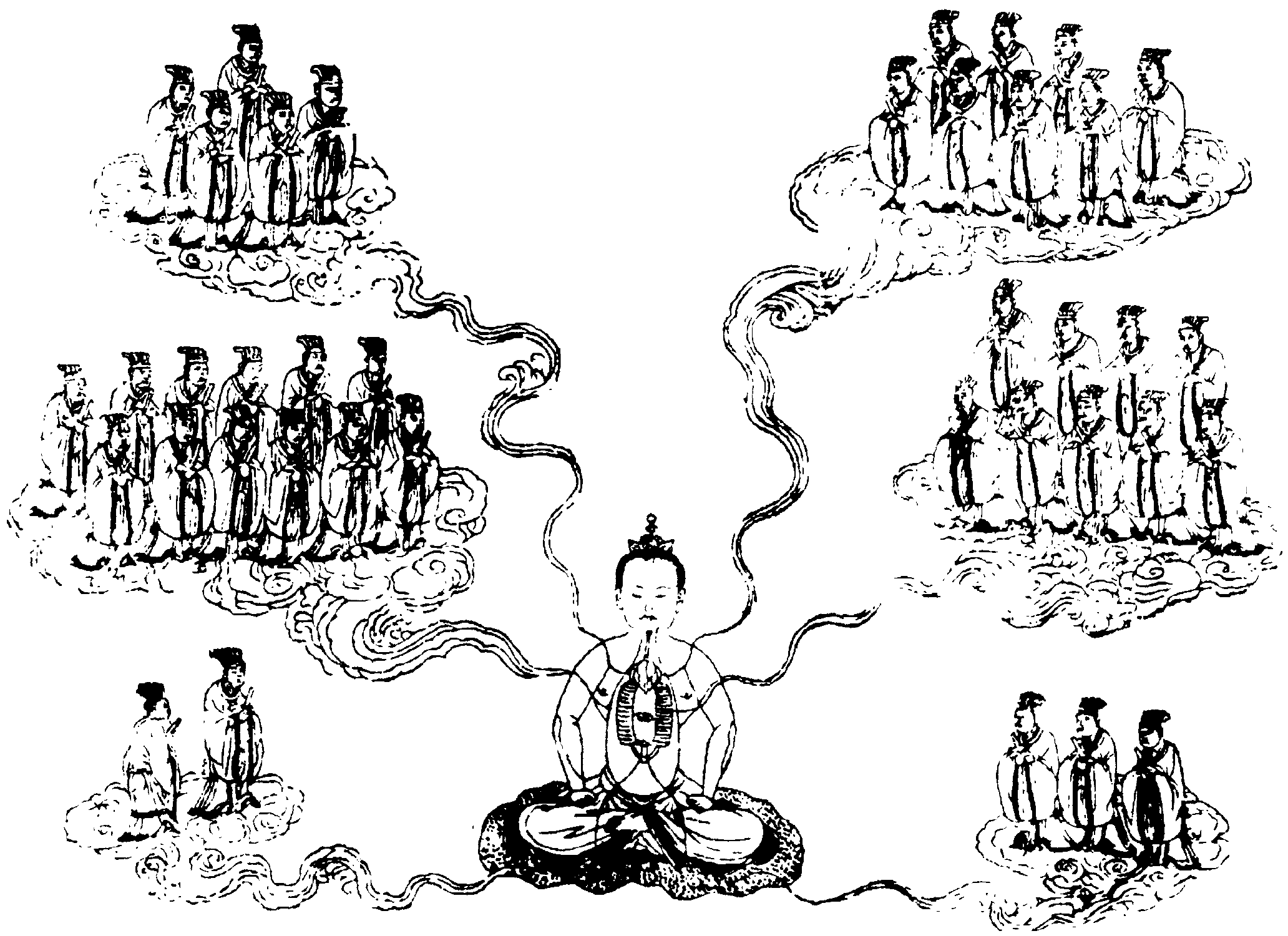
A depiction of body gods from the True Text of the Great Dong

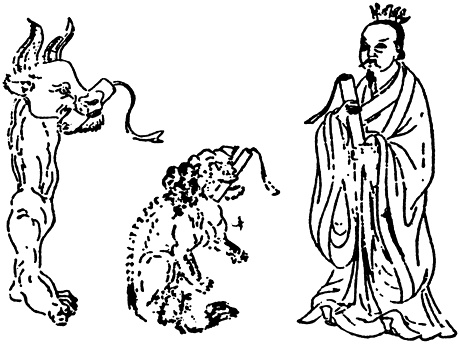
Sanshi 三尸 "Three Corpses" illustration from the (c. 9th century) Chu sanshi jiuchong baoshengjing 除三尸九蟲保生經

== See also ==
- Microcosm and macrocosm
- Soul dualism
- Internal alchemy
