= The Book of Balance and Harmony =

The Book of Balance and Harmony (Chinese: 中和集; pinyin: Zhong he ji) is a thirteenth-century Chinese anthology by the Taoist master Li Daochun (李道純, fl. 1288-1292) which outlines the teachings and practices of the Quanzhen School ("Way of complete reality").

The Zhong he ji begins by affirming the theory of the Integration of the Three Doctrines (三教合一; Sanjiao Heyi). This theory holds that Daoism, Confucianism and Buddhism evolved in different ways but are all based on the Absolute, or Supreme Ultimate (太極; Taiji). Thus the opening lines of the book state:

The absolute is movement and stillness without beginning, yin and yang without beginning. Buddhists call this complete awareness, Taoists call it the gold pill, Confucians call it the absolute. What is called the infinite absolute means the limit of the unlimited. Buddha called it "as is, immutable, ever clearly aware". The I Ching says, "tranquil and unperturbed, yet sensitive and effective". An alchemical text says, "Body and mind unstirring, subsequently there is yet an endless real potential". Yet all refer to the subtle root of the absolute.

Central to the book is the search for the "gold pill" (金丹; Jindan), which produces spiritual transcendence and immortality. This practice is divided into Weidan (outer medicine) which deals with the physical body, and inner medicine (內丹; Neidan), which includes various forms of mental practices and deals with the spirit.

The Book of Harmony also describes the experience of the "Mysterious Pass" (玄關; Xuanguan) and states that it has no fixed physical location. The Mysterious Pass is the central experience in which the Taoist practitioner achieves transcendence. The book then proceeds to outline a wide variety of practices and meditation techniques to achieve vitality, energy, and spirit - named the "three treasures".

The book also includes a varied collection of Poems and Songs.
