= Xiuzhen Cheng =

- Citizenship: China
- Education: National University of Defense Technology (BSc); University of Minnesota (MSc, PhD)
- Occupations: researcher, academic
- Employer: Shandong University.
- Title: professor

Xiuzhen (Susan) Cheng is a Chinese computer scientist whose research interests include wireless sensor networks, edge computing, and the internet of things. She is a professor of computer science at Shandong University.

== Education and career ==
Cheng earned a bachelor's degree from the National University of Defense Technology in 1991. She went to the University of Minnesota for graduate study, earning a master's degree in 2000 and completing her Ph.D. in 2002.

After working at George Washington University in Washington, DC from 2002 to 2020, she moved in 2020 to her present position as a professor of computer science at Shandong University in Qingdao.

== Recognition ==
Cheng was named Fellow of the Institute of Electrical and Electronics Engineers (IEEE) in 2015, for "contributions to localization and detection in sensor networks".
