= Neijing Tu =

Diagram in Daoism

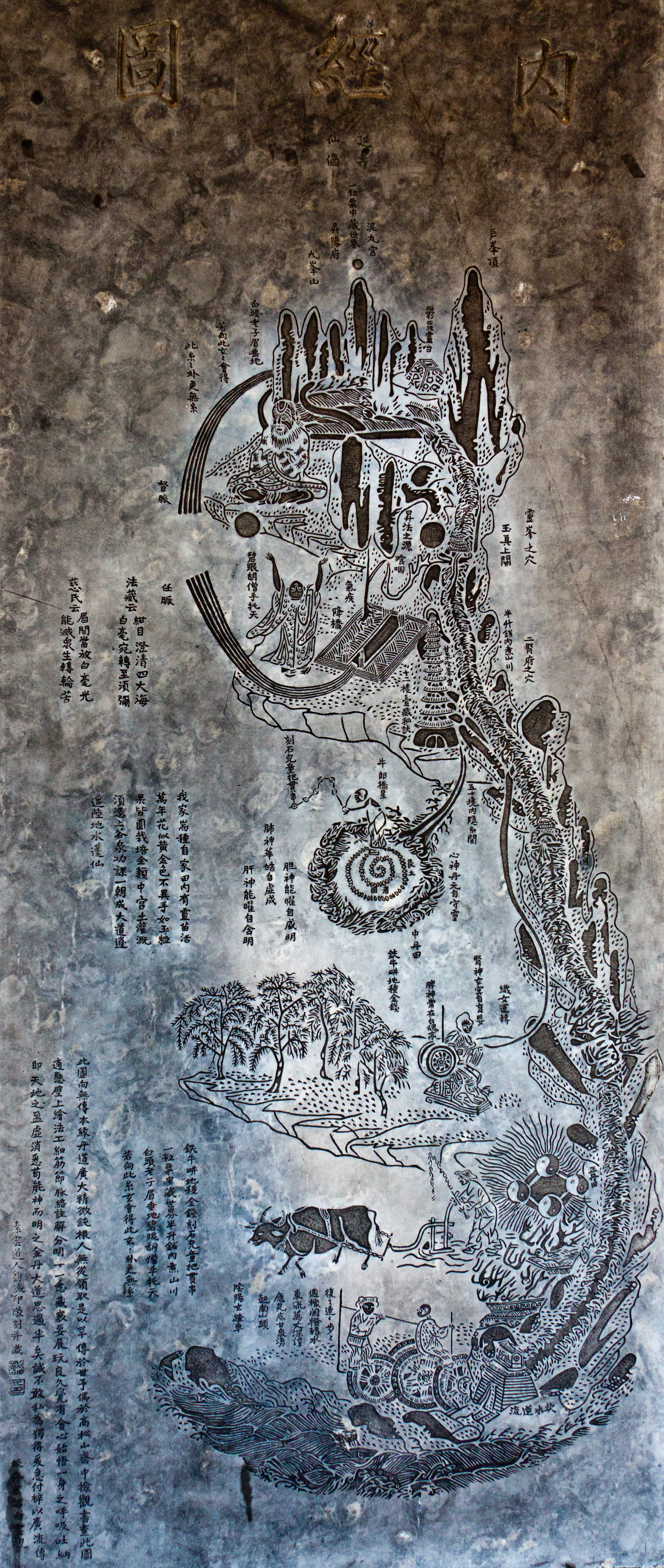
The Neijing Tu

The Neijing Tu (simplified Chinese: 內经图; traditional Chinese: 內經圖; pinyin: Nèijīng tú; Wade–Giles: Nei-ching t'u) is a Daoist "inner landscape" diagram of the human body illustrating Neidan 'internal alchemy', Wu Xing, Yin and Yang, and Chinese mythology.

== Title ==
The name Neijing tu combines 內; nei; "inside; inner; internal", 經; jing; "warp (vs. woof); scripture, canon, classic; (TCM) meridian; channel", and 圖; tu; "picture; drawing; chart; map; plan". This title, comparable with 黃帝內經; Huangdi Neijing; "Yellow Emperor's Inner Canon", is generally interpreted as a "chart" or "diagram" of "inner" "meridians" or "channels" of Traditional Chinese medicine for circulating qi in neidan preventative and observational practices.

English translations of Neijing tu include:

- "Diagram of the Internal Texture of Man"
- "Diagram of the Inner Scripture"
- "Chart of Inner Passageways"
- "Diagram of Internal Pathways"
- "Chart of the Inner Warp" or "Chart of the Inner Landscape"

內經圖; Neijing tu has an alternate writing of 內景圖; Neijing tu; "Diagram of Interior Lights", using 景; jing; "view; scenery; condition" as a variant Chinese character for 經; jing.

== History ==
While the original Neijing tu provenance is unclear, it probably dates from the 19th century. All received copies derive from an engraved stele dated 1886 in Beijing's White Cloud Temple 白雲觀 that records how 柳誠印; Liu Chengyin based it on an old silk scroll discovered in a library on Mount Song (in Henan). In addition, a Qing Dynasty colored scroll Neijing tu was painted at the 如意館; Ruyi Guan; "Palace of Fulfilled Wishes" library in the Forbidden City.

The Neijing Tu was the precursor for the 修真圖; Xiuzhen Tu; "Cultivating Perfection Diagram". The earliest anatomical diagrams with Daoist Neidan symbolism are attributed to 煙蘿子; Yanluozi (fl. 10th century) and conserved in the 1250 CE 修真十書; Xiuzhen shishu; "Cultivating Perfection Ten Books".

== Contents ==
The Neijing tu laterally depicts a human body (resembling either meditator or fetus) as a microcosm of nature – an "inner landscape" with mountains, rivers, paths, forests, and stars. Joseph Needham coins the term "microsomography" and describes the Neijing tu as "much more fanciful and poetical" than previous Daoist illustrations.

The textual descriptions include names of zangfu organs, two poems attributed to 呂洞賓; Lü Dongbin (born ca. 798 CE, one of the Eight Immortals), and quotations from the 黃庭經; Huangting jing; "Yellow Court Scripture".

The Neijing image of a mountain with crags on the skull and spinal column elaborates upon the "body-as-mountain" metaphor, first recorded in 1227 CE. The head shows Kunlun Mountains, upper dantian "cinnabar field", Laozi, Bodhidharma, and two circles for the eyes (labelled "sun" and "moon"). The flanking poem explains.

The white-headed old man's eyebrows hang down to earth;

The blue-eyed foreign monk's arms support heaven.
If you aspire to this mysticism;

You will acquire its secret.

Chinese constellations figure prominently. The heart depicts 牛郎; Niulang; 'the cowherd'; "Altair" holding the 北斗; Beidou; 'Northern Dipper'; "Big Dipper". Together with his archetypal lover 織女; Zhinü; 'the weaver girl'; "Vega" (see Qi Xi), they propel qi up to the tracheal Twelve-Storied Pagoda. The liver and gall bladder are a forest, the stomach is a granary, and the intestines caption reads "the iron ox ploughs the field where coins of gold are sown" referring to the Elixir of life. At base of the spine are treadmill waterwheels (an early Chinese invention) being run by two children representing yin and yang.

== See also ==
- Xiuzhen Tu
- Meridian (Chinese medicine)
- Microcosm–macrocosm analogy
- Pi Wei Lun
- Ziwu Liuzhu
