= Neidan =

Esoteric doctrines and physical, mental, and spiritual practices in Taoism

- Seal script for nèidān 内丹

Chinese name
- Traditional Chinese: 內丹
- Simplified Chinese: 内丹
- Literal meaning: inside cinnabar
Transcriptions
Standard Mandarin
- Hanyu Pinyin: nèidān
- Bopomofo: ㄋㄟˋㄉㄢ
- Gwoyeu Romatzyh: neydan
- Wade–Giles: nei-tan
- IPA: neitan
Yue: Cantonese
- Jyutping: noi^{6}daan^{6}
Southern Min
- Hokkien POJ: lǎitan
Middle Chinese
- Middle Chinese: nuʌiHtɑn
Old Chinese
- Baxter–Sagart (2014): nˤ[u]p-s/tˤan

Korean name
- Hangul: 내단
- Hanja: 内丹
Transcriptions
- Revised Romanization: naedan
- McCune–Reischauer: naedan

Japanese name
- Kanji: 内丹
- Hiragana: ないたん
Transcriptions
- Revised Hepburn: naitan

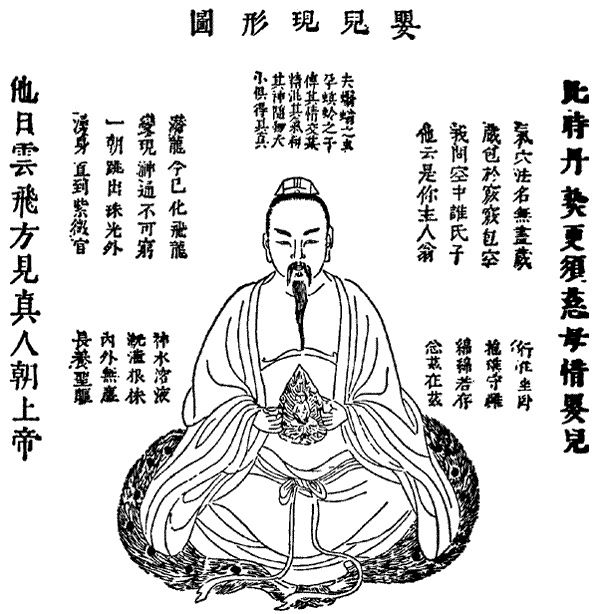
Development of the immortal embryo in the lower dantian of the Daoist cultivator

Neidan, or internal alchemy (traditional Chinese: 內丹術; simplified Chinese: 內丹术; pinyin: nèidān shù), is an array of esoteric doctrines and physical, mental, and spiritual practices that Taoist initiates use in hopes to prolong life and create an immortal spiritual body that would survive after death. Also known as Jindan (金丹 "golden elixir"), internal alchemy combines theories derived from external alchemy (waidan 外丹), correlative cosmology (including the Five Phases), the emblems of the Yijing, and medical theory, with techniques of Taoist meditation, daoyin gymnastics, and sexual hygiene.

In neidan practice, Taoists claim the human body becomes a cauldron (or "vessel") in which the Three Treasures of Jing ("Essence"), Qi ("Breath") and Shen ("Spirit") are 'cultivated' for the purpose of improving physical, emotional and mental health, and ultimately returning to the primordial unity of the Tao, i.e., attaining Taoist Immortality. It is believed the Xiuzhen Tu is such a cultivation map. In China, this act is an important form of practice for most schools of Taoism.

== Terminology ==
The Chinese compound nèidān combines the common word nèi 內 meaning "inside; inner; internal" with dān 丹 "cinnabar; vermillion; elixir; alchemy". The antonym of nèi is wài 外 "outside; exterior; external", and nèidān "internal elixir / alchemy" was coined from the earlier complementary term wàidān 外丹 "external elixir / alchemy".

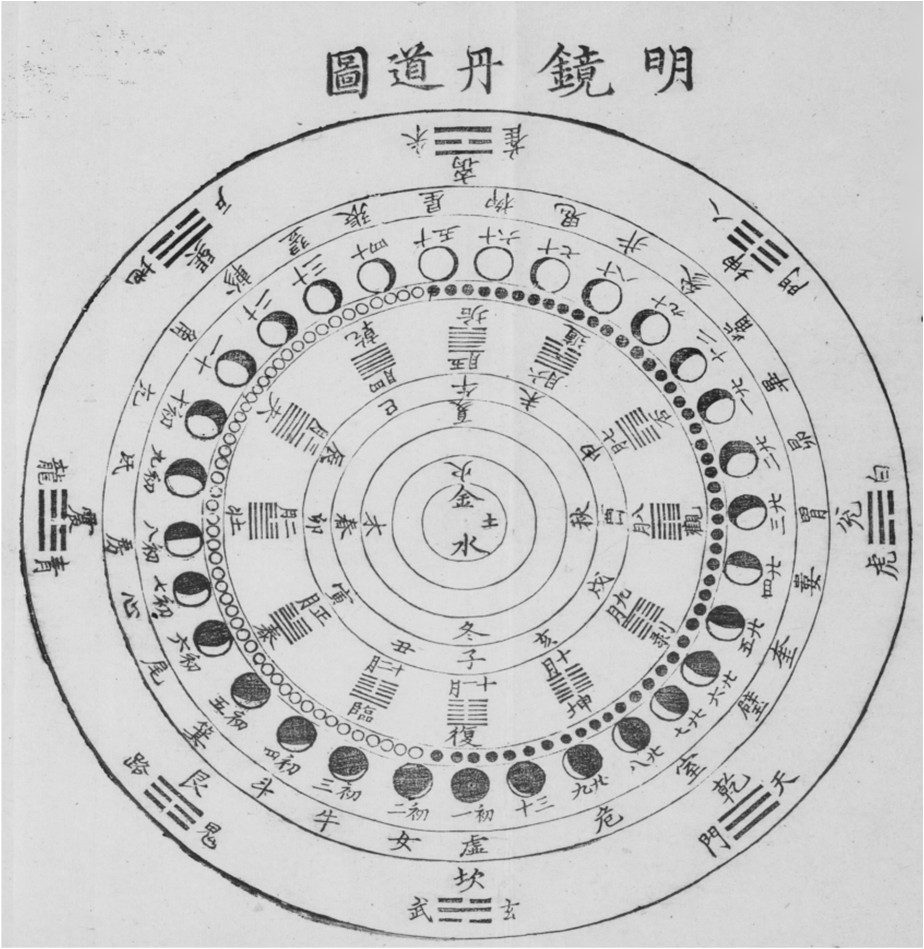
Mingjing Dandao tu (明鏡丹道圖, 'Bright Mirror of Internal Alchemy') using diagrams to systematically elucidate neidan theory

Traditional Chinese medical alchemical texts and sources ordinarily call neidan the jīndān dào 金丹道 or Way of the Golden Elixir. In Modern Standard Chinese usage, the term nèidān shù 內丹術 (with 術 "art; skill; technique; method") refers generally to internal alchemical practices for longevity by maintaining good health, and the prevention of pain and suffering.

The date for the earliest use of the term neidan is uncertain. 內丹 or neidan had been mentioned in 灵剑子 by Xu Xun 许逊 in Jin dynasty (266–420), but on the other hand Arthur Waley proposed that it was first recorded in the 559 vow taken by Tiantai Buddhist patriarch Nanyue Huisi praying to successfully make an elixir that would keep him alive until the coming of Maitreya. Many scholars agreed, including Joseph Needham and Lu Gwei-djen who translated Huisi's vow to live as an ascetic in the mountains:

I am seeking for the longevity in order to defend the Faith, not in order to enjoy worldly happiness. I pray that all the saints and sages will come to my help, so that I may get some good magic mushrooms [zhi 芝], and numinous elixirs [shendan 神丹], enabling me to cure all illnesses and to stop both hunger and thirst. In this way I shall be able to practice continually the way of the Sutras and to engage in the several forms of meditations. I shall hope to find a peaceful dwelling in the depths of the mountains, with enough numinous elixirs and medicine to carry out my plans. Thus, by the aids of external elixirs [waidan] I shall be able to cultivate the elixir within [neidan].

Others believed that neidan first occurred in the biographies of Deng Yuzhi 鄧郁之 (fl. 483–493) and Su Yuanming 蘇元明 (fl. c. 600). However, the authenticity of the relevant passages mentioned above is doubtful.

The term neidan was seldom used throughout the late Tang dynasty (618–907) and Five dynasties (907–960) period, and only became widespread around the beginning of the Song dynasty (960–1279) period, when neidan evolved into a highly complex system in both its theoretical and practical aspects. Tang texts described internal alchemical practices with the words fúyào 服藥 "take drug/medicine" and chángshēng 長生 "long life, longevity; (Taoism) eternal life". Liu Xiyue's 劉希岳 988 Taixuan langranzi jindao shi 太玄朗然子進道詩 (Master Taixuan Langran's Poems on Advancing in the Tao) has the earliest datable mention of the terms neidan and waidan. The c. 1019 Yunji Qiqian Taoist anthology mentions the term neidan.

Early texts that mention neidan define it as synonymous or similar to some qi circulation techniques: Cultivation and Transmutation (xiulian 修煉), Embryonic Breathing (taixi 胎息), the Cyclical Elixir (huandan 還丹), the Golden Elixir (jindan 金丹), the Great Elixir (dadan 大丹), the Interior and Exterior Medicines (nei/waiyao 内外藥), the Inner and Outer Counterparts (nei/waixiang 内外象), and the Yin Elixir and Yang Elixir (yindan 陰丹 and yangdan 陽丹).

Based upon the textual evidence, Farzeen Baldrian-Hussein concludes that in early texts, neidan refers to a specific technique, and by Song Emperor Zhenzong's reign (997–1022), the term designates a group of techniques, expressed in specific alchemical language.

It is sometimes transliterated using the older Wade–Giles system as Neitan in literature on western Alchemy.

== History and development ==
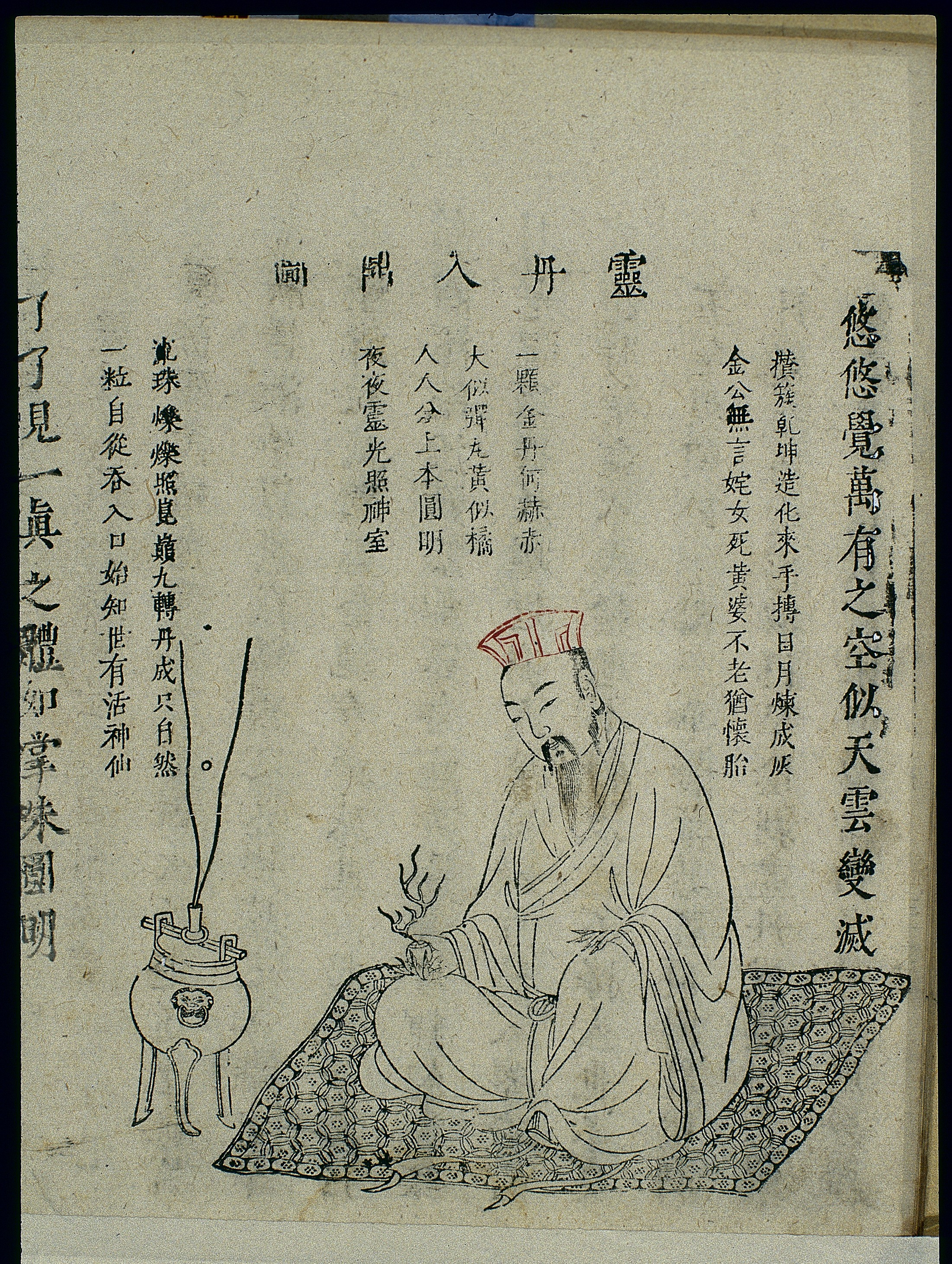
Chinese woodblock illustration of neidan "Putting the miraculous elixir on the ding tripod", 1615 Xingming guizhi (Pointers on Spiritual Nature and Bodily Life)

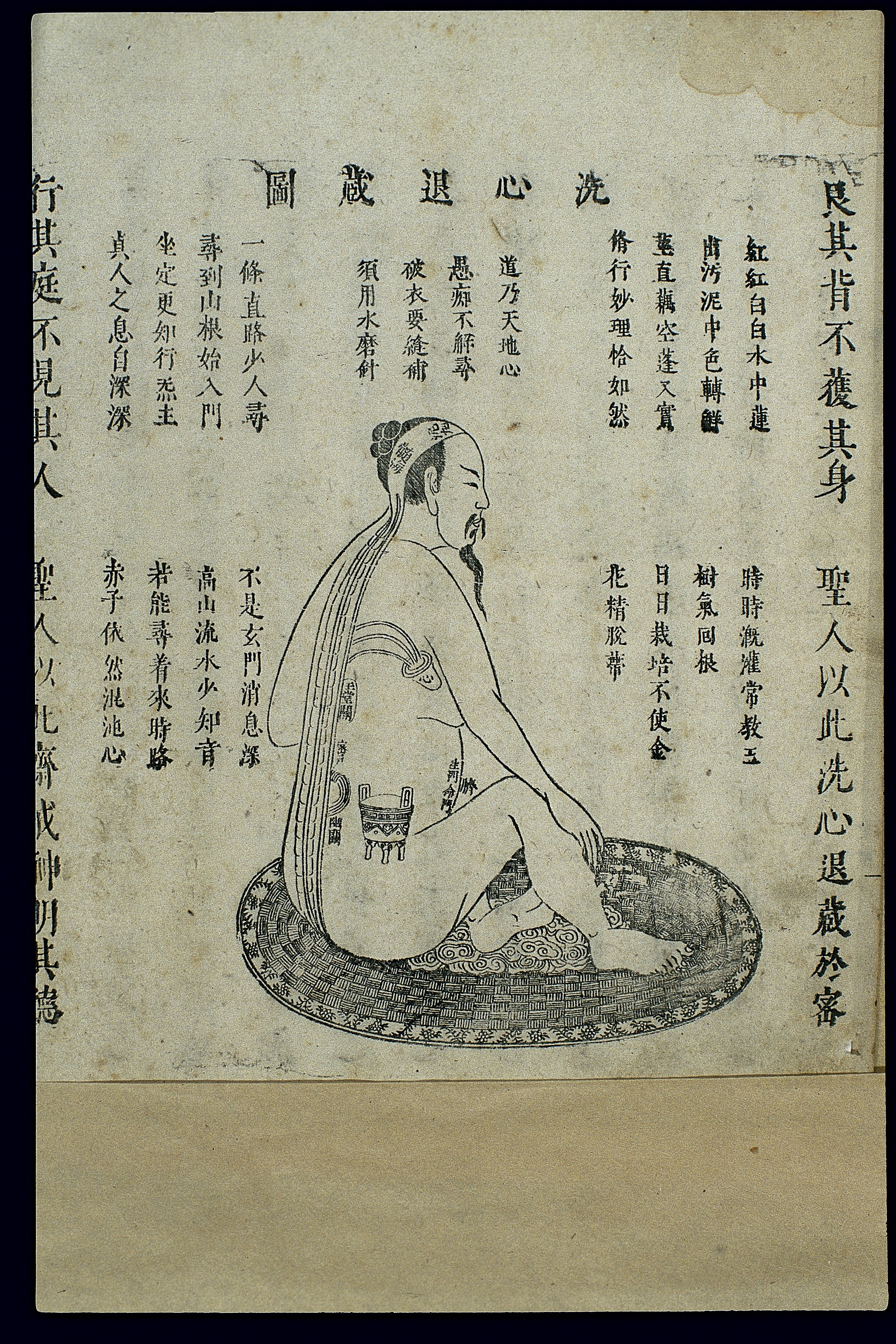
Chinese woodblock illustration of neidan "Cleansing the heart-mind and retiring into concealment", 1615 Xingming guizhi

Neidan is part of the Chinese alchemical meditative tradition that is said to have been separated into internal and external (Waidan) at some point during the Tang dynasty. The Cantong qi (The Kinship of the Three) is the earliest known book on theoretical alchemy in China; it was written by the alchemist Wei Boyang in 142 AD. This text influenced the formation of neidan, whose earliest existing texts date from the first half of the 8th century. The authors of several neidan articles refer to their teachings as the Way of the Golden Elixir (jindan zhi dao). The majority of Chinese alchemical sources is found in the Daozang (Taoist Canon), the largest collection of Taoist texts.

Neidan shares a significant portion of its notions and methods with classical Chinese medicine, fangshi and with other bodies of practices, such as meditation and the methods for "nourishing life" (yangsheng). What distinguishes alchemy from these related traditions is its unique view of the elixir as a material or immaterial entity that represents the original state of being and the attainment of that state. The neidan tradition of internal alchemy is practiced by working with the energies that were already present in the human body as opposed to using natural substances, medicines or elixirs, from outside of the body. The Shangqing School of Taoism played an important role in the emergence of neidan alchemy, after using Waidan mainly as a meditative practice, and therefore turning it from an external to an internal art.

Beginning in the 18th century some ideas of this internal alchemical practice began migrating to Europe first via, Franz von Cargelhoth, who documented much of his understanding of this practice in letters written in 1722. "Among, the Taoist practice in China, there seems to be a growing movement toward the practice of Nei dan or "Internal Alchemy". Interestingly, he notes that, "The fervency for this new internal mediation of alchemical work by the balancing of the 3 core aspects we know as salt, mercury, and sulfur, seems wide reaching. Many of the villages I have travelled to lament any mention of numinous elixirs as poison to the ears. It appears there was a farrago of doctors and medicine men selling xiaori nges full of medicinal solutions containing, most likely opium or khat alongside a host of other additional herbs which though alleviated the burden of a disease temporarily quickly caused death or its worsening soon after."

== The Three Treasures ==
Internal alchemy focuses upon transforming the bodily sanbao "three treasures", which are the essential energies sustaining human life:

- Jing 精 "nutritive essence, essence; refined, perfected; extract; soul, dark, animal instincts, demon; sperm, ovum, seed, Genetics"
- Qi 氣 "acquired energy, air, food, water, vital energy, grey, force; air, vapour; breath; vigor; attitude"
- Shen 神 "spirit; mind, glow, bright; god, deity; vitality supernatural abilities, higher intentions, supernatural being"

According to the 13th-century Book of Balance and Harmony:

Making one's essence complete, one can preserve the body. To do so, first keep the body at ease, and make sure there are no desires. Thereby energy can be made complete.
Making one's energy complete, one can nurture the mind. To do so, first keep the mind pure, and make sure there are no thoughts. Thereby spirit can be made complete.
Making one's spirit complete, one can recover emptiness. To do so, first keep the will sincere, and make sure body and mind are united. Thereby spirit can be returned to emptiness. ... To attain immortality, there is nothing else but the refinement of these three treasures: essence, energy, spirit."

When the "three treasures" are internally maintained, along with a balance of yin and yang, it is possible to achieve a healthy body and longevity, which are the main goals of internal alchemy (Ching 1996, 395).

=== Jing ===
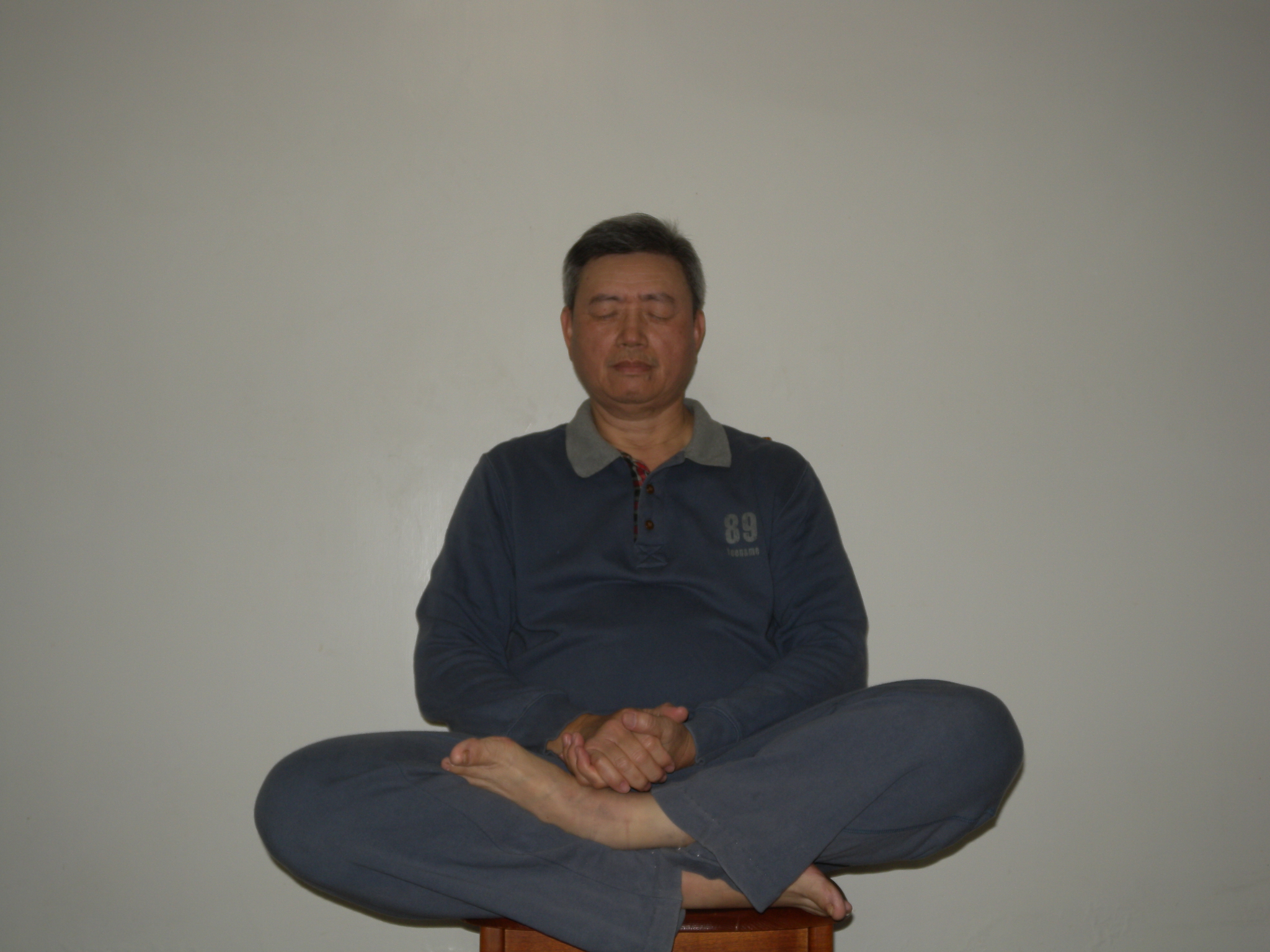
Neidan practice

Jing "essence" referring to the primordial energies of the physical body. Based upon the idea that death and illness are caused by over straining and stressing of one's mind and body leads to the depletion of one's jing, Daoist internal alchemy claims that preserving jing allows one to have a long, healthy and happy life, known classically as longevity in Chinese thought, if not immortality.

=== Qi ===
Qi or ch'i is defined as the "natural energy of the universe" and manifests in everyone and everything. By means of internal alchemy, Taoists strive to maintain a positive free flow of qi through the body in paths or meridians moving to each individual organ. as Stagnation of qi is a primary or root cause of many health conditions in traditional Chinese thinking.

Healing practices such as acupuncture, Tui na, cupping and herbal medicines are believed to open up the qi meridians throughout the body so that the qi can flow freely. Keeping qi in balance and flowing throughout the body promotes health; imbalance can lead to sickness.

=== Shen ===
Shen is the spirit of animation of the body. To have good Shen is to look vital and glowing on the surface of the skin and the gloss and spark seen in the eyes. It is the hue on the leaf of a tree. Taoists understand that conscious is shen through contemplative practices, including meditation.

== See also ==
- Daoyin
- Bigu (avoiding grains)
- Liu Yiming (1734–1821)
- Neigong
- Neijia
- Neijing Tu
- Pseudoscience
- Qigong

== Works cited ==
- Baldrian-Hussein, Farzeen (1989). "Inner Alchemy: Notes on the Origin and Use of the Term Neidan". Cahiers d'Extrême-Asie. 5: 163–190. doi:10.3406/asie.1989.947.
- Baldrian-Hussein, Farzeen (2008). "Neidan" 內丹. In Pregadio, Fabrizio (ed.). The Encyclopedia of Taoism. London and New York: Routledge. pp. 762–66. ISBN 978-0-7007-1200-7..
- Carroll, Robert Todd (2008). "Chi (Ch'i or qi)" Chi.". Skeptic's Dictionary.
- Ching, Julia (1996). "East Asian Religions". In Oxtoby, Willard G. (ed.). World Religions, Eastern Traditions. Oxford University Press. pp. 346–467.
- Kohn, Livia (1956). Daoism and Chinese Culture. Cambridge, Mass.: Three Pines Press. pp. 145–149.
- Littleton, Scott C. (1999). The Sacred East. Duncan Baird Publishers.
- Needham, Joseph and Lu Gwei-djen (1983). "Spagyrical Discovery and Invention: Physiological Alchemy". Science and Civilisation in China. Vol. Chemistry and Chemical Technology. Cambridge University Press.
- Schipper, Kristofer (1993). The Taoist Body. Translated by Duval, Karen C. Berkeley, CA: University of California Press.
- Skar, Lowell; Pregadio, Fabrizio (2000). "Inner Alchemy (Neidan)". In Kohn, Livia (ed.). Daoism Handbook. Leiden and Boston: Brill. pp. 464–97. ISBN 9004112081.
- Smith, Huston (1986). The World's Religions. New York: HarperCollins Publishers.
- Thompson, Laurence (1989). Chinese Religion: An Introduction. Belmont, CA: Wadsworth.
- Waley, Arthur (1930). "Notes on Chinese Alchemy (Supplementary to Johnson's A Study of Chinese Alchemy)". Bulletin of the School of Oriental Studies. 6 (1): 1–24. doi:10.1017/S0041977X00090911. S2CID 191324421.
