= Xiuzhen Tu =

Daoist diagram of human body

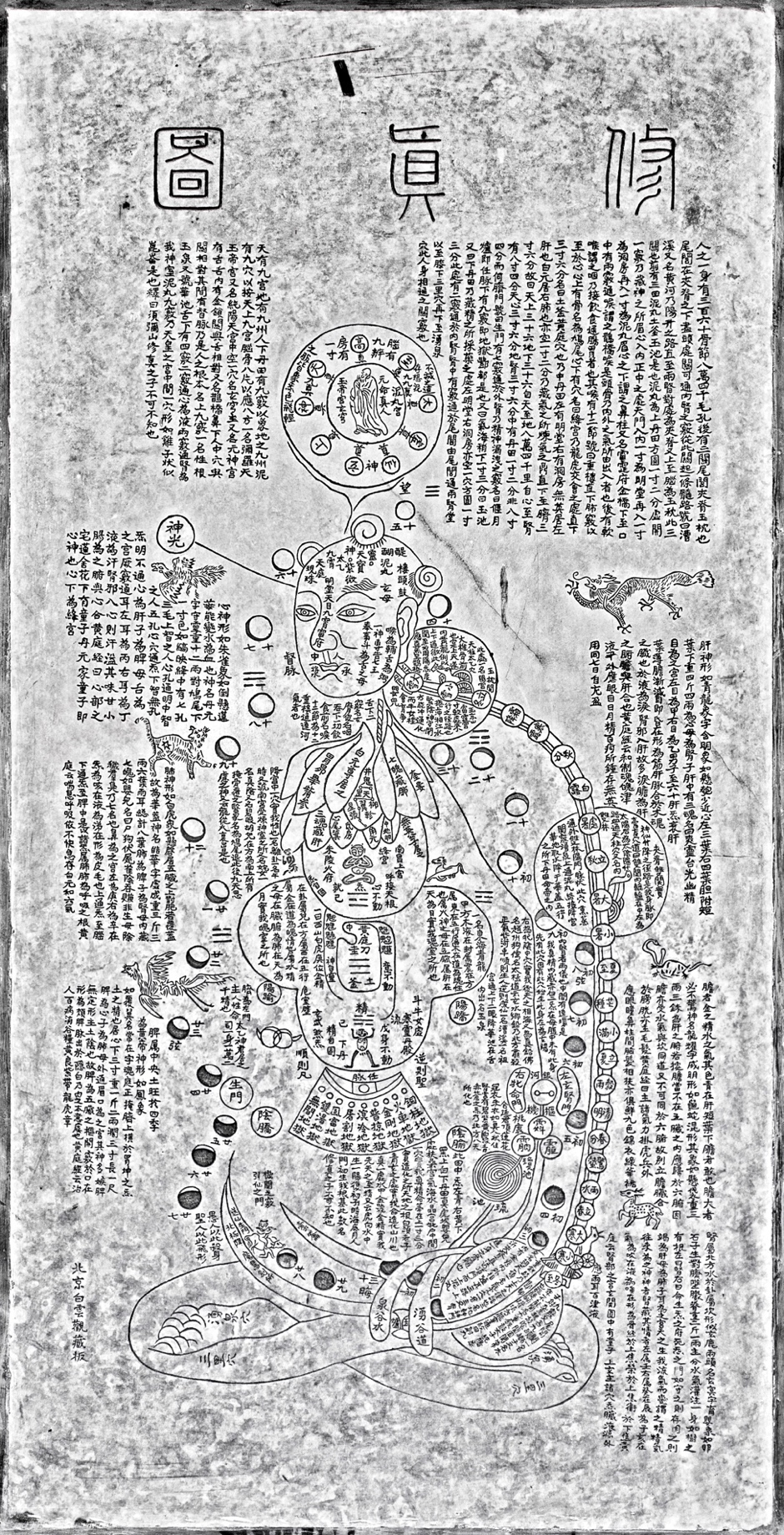
Xiuzhen tu, stone stele, erected at White Cloud Temple in 1890

The Xiuzhen tu (simplified Chinese: 修真图; traditional Chinese: 修真圖; pinyin: Xiūzhēn tú; Wade–Giles: Hsiu-chen t'u) is a Daoist diagram of the human body illustrating the preventative Chinese medical principles called Neidan 'internal alchemy', incorporating Chinese astrology, and cosmology.

== Title ==
The title Xiuzhen tu combines three Chinese words:

- xiu 修 "embellish, decorate; repair, overhaul; study, cultivate; build, construct; trim, prune; write, compile"
- zhen 真 "true; real; genuine" or (Daoist) "original, unspoiled character of a person; ultimate reality; a xian transcendent".
- tu 圖 "picture; drawing; chart; map; plan"

Common examples of this special Daoist zhen "ultimate truth" meaning include Zhenren 真人 "true person; Spiritual Master" and Quanzhen 全真 "complete truth; Quanzhen School".

Xiuzhen tu is translated into English as:

- "Illustration of Developing Trueness" (Alphen and Aris 1995:170)
- "Chart of the Cultivation of Perfection" (Kohn 2000:487)
- "Diagram of Cultivating Perfection" (Komjathy 2004:53)
- "Chart for the Cultivation of Perfection" (Despeux 2008:767)

Xiuzhen (Chinese: 修真; pinyin: xiūzhēn; Wade–Giles: hsiu-chen; lit. 'cultivate truth') is an uncommon word associated with Daoism. It first appears in Ge Hong's (4th century CE) Baopuzi 抱朴子 (行品 chapter), which says xiuzhen practices characterize a daoren 道人 "Daoist". Xiushen 修身 and xiudao 修道 are more common synonyms of xiuzhen that occurred centuries earlier in pre-Han Chinese classic texts.

Xiushen (Chinese: 修身; pinyin: xiūshēn; Wade–Giles: hsiu-shen; lit. 'cultivate oneself') is a basic moral principle of Chinese philosophy. In Confucianism, xiushen is the ethical basis for social order. The Great Learning (tr. Legge 1893:266) says ancient rulers utilized "self cultivation": "Their persons being cultivated, their families were regulated. Their families being regulated, their states were rightly governed. Their states being rightly governed, the whole kingdom was made tranquil and happy." In Daoism, xiushen refers to a supernatural "self cultivation". The Zhuangzi (tr. Mair 1994:96) claims it can result in long life: "Carefully guard your body, and leave other things to prosper themselves. I guard the one so as to dwell in harmony. Thus have I cultivated my person for one thousand two hundred years and my physical form has still not decayed."

Xiudao (Chinese: 修道; pinyin: xiūdào; Wade–Giles: hsiu-tao; lit. 'cultivate the Way') means "practice a religious regimen; follow religious rules; enter a monastery". The first sentence in the Confucian Doctrine of the Mean (tr. Legge 1893:124) associates xiudao with jiao 教 "teach; instruct": "What Heaven has conferred is called The Nature; an accordance with this nature is called The Path of duty; the regulation of this path is called Instruction."

== History ==
The Xiuzhen tu text probably dates "from the early 19th century" (Komjathy 2004:53) and exists in several versions, some with variant titles like Xiuzhen quantu 修真全圖 "Cultivation of Perfection Complete Diagram". All editions are associated with the Longmen "Dragon Gate" sect of the Quanzhen school of Daoism. Catherine Despeux (2008:770) lists five extant versions: a stele at the Sanyuan Gong 三元宮 "Three Primes Palace" in Guangzhou (dated 1812); printed versions from the Wudang Mountains (1924 reprint of 1888), Shanghai (1920), and Chengdu (1922); and a version at the White Cloud Temple in Beijing (undated).

The Xiuzhen Tu resembles the better-known Neijing Tu 內經圖 "Inner Pathways Diagram". Both these anatomical charts with Daoist Neidan symbolism derive from the earliest diagrams attributed to Yanluozi 煙蘿子 (fl. 10th century) and conserved in the 1250 CE Xiuzhen shishu 修真十書 "Cultivating Perfection Ten Books" (Kohn 2000:521).

== Contents ==
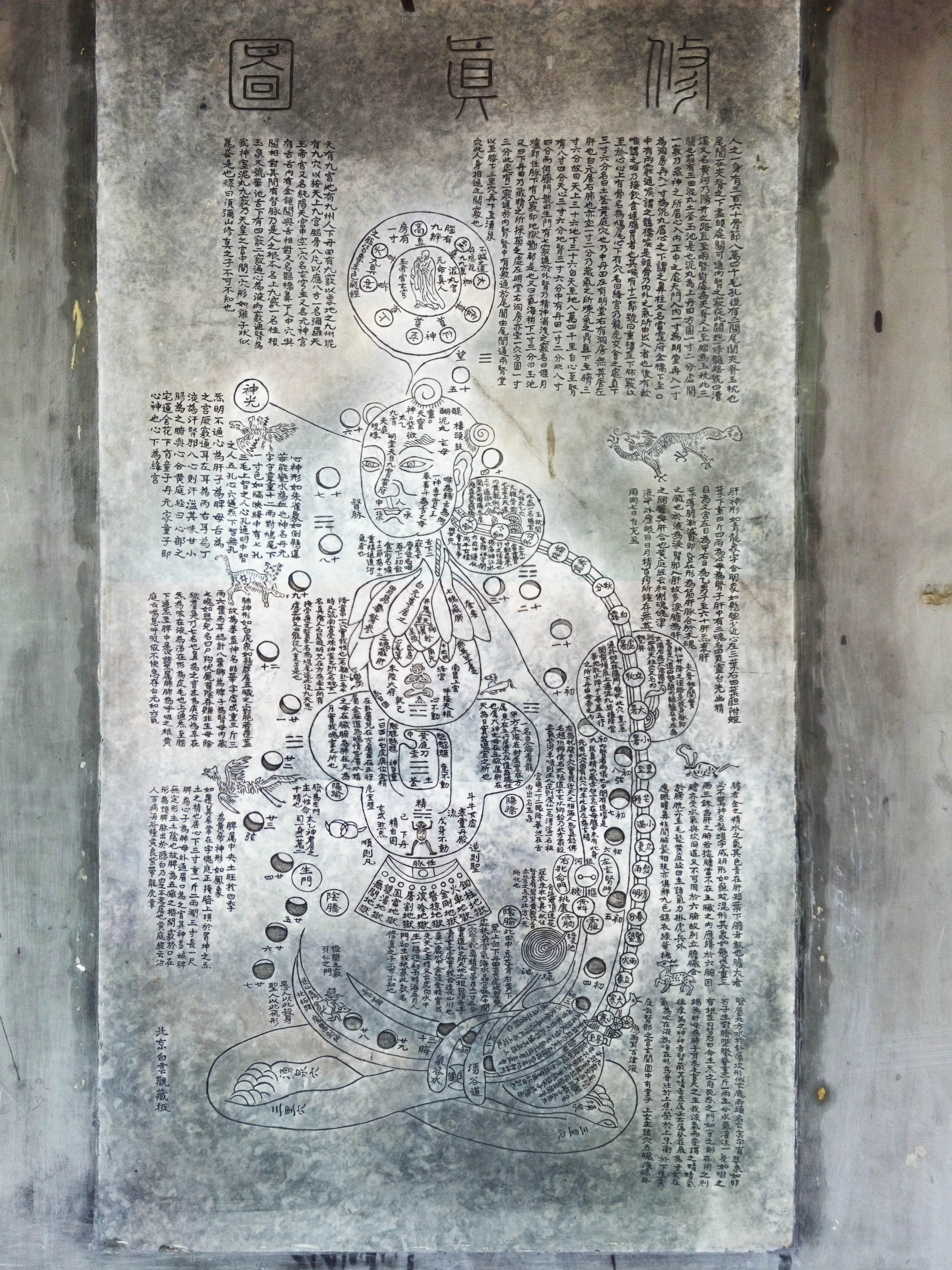
Xiuzhen Tu stone stele

Contrasted with the Neijing tu, the Xiuzhen tu pictures the meditator's body in a front view rather than side, and includes a longer textual portion, which describes Neidan practices, lunar phases, and Leifa 雷法 "Thunder Rites" associated with the Zhengyi Dao movement of the Tianshi Dao "Way of Celestial Masters".

Despeux summarizes Xiuzhen tu differences.

The elements that distinguish this chart from the Neijing tu are mainly related to the Thunder Rites (leifa) – in particular, the spiral at the level of the kidneys, the nine "orifices of hell" at the base of the spine, and the three curls at the top of the head that represent the three primordial breaths according to the Tianxin zhengfa tradition. The chart also represents the main parts of the body, including the Cinnabar Fields (dantian), the Three Passes (sanguan, represented by the three chariots) of the back, the throat, the paradisiacal and infernal worlds, and the body's divinities according to the Huangting jing, and also shows the firing process (huohou). The whole is reminiscent of a talisman illustrating a divine body that connects to the sacred world. (2008:770)

At the same time, the Xiuzhen tu underscores cosmological elements. In particular, the human figure is surrounded by thirty black and white circles that represent the days of the lunar month, one of the models of the Neidan "fire phases". The trigrams arranged around the figure (Zhen ☳, Dui ☱, Qian ☰, Xun ☴, Gen ☶, and Kun ☷) represent the six stages of the lunar cycle, each of which is made of five days.

== See also ==
- Meridian (Chinese medicine)
- Microcosm–macrocosm analogy
