= List of acupuncture points =

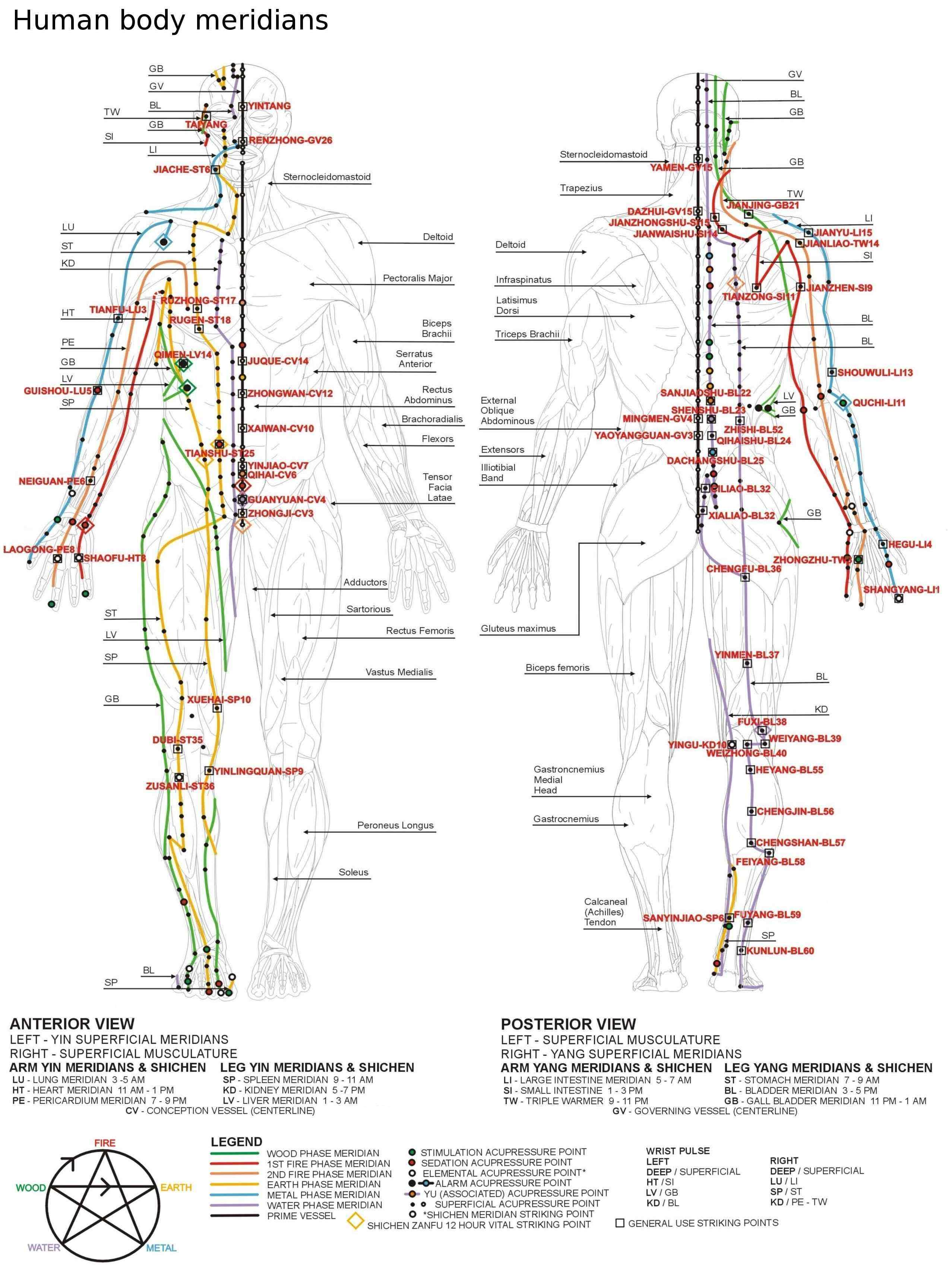
System of main meridians with acupuncture point locations

This article provides a comprehensive list of acupuncture points, locations on the body used in acupuncture, acupressure, and other treatment systems based on Traditional Chinese Medicine (TCM).

== Locations and basis ==
More than four hundred acupuncture points have been described, with the majority located on one of the twenty main cutaneous and subcutaneous meridians, pathways which run throughout the body and according to Traditional Chinese Medicine (TCM) transport qi. Twelve of these major meridians, commonly referred to as "the primary meridians", are bilateral and practitioners associate them with internal organs. The remaining eight meridians are designated as "extraordinary", and are also bilateral except for three, one that encircles the body near the waist, and two that run along the midline of the body. Only those two extraordinary meridians that run along the midline contain their own points, the remaining six comprise points from the aforementioned twelve primary meridians. There are also points that are not located on the fourteen major meridians but do lie in the complete nexus referred to as Jīngluò (經絡). Such outliers are often referred to as "extra points".

There is no anatomical and physiological basis for acupuncture points and meridians. In practice, acupuncture points are located by a combination of anatomical landmarks, palpation, and feedback from the patient.

=== Twelve Primary Meridians ===
Code	Chinese name	Pinyin	English	Korean 한글	Vietnamese
LU	手太陰肺經	shǒu tàiyīn fèi jīng	Lung	수태음폐경	Thủ thái âm phế
LI	手陽明大腸經	shǒu yángmíng dàcháng jīng	Large Intestine	수양명대장경	Thủ dương minh đại trường
ST	足陽明胃經	zú yángmíng wèi jīng	Stomach	족양명위경	Túc dương minh vị
SP	足太陰脾經	zú tàiyīn pí jīng	Spleen	족태음비경	Túc thái âm tỳ
HT	手少陰心經	shǒu shǎo yīn xīnjīng	Heart	수소음심경	Thủ thiếu âm tâm
SI	手太陽小腸經	shǒu tàiyáng xiǎocháng jīng	Small Intestine	수태양소장경	Thủ thái dương tiểu trường
BL	足太陽膀胱經	zú tàiyáng pángguāng jīng	Bladder	족태양방광경	Túc thái dương bàng quang
KI	足少陰腎經	zú shǎo yīn shèn jīng	Kidney	족소음신경	Túc thiếu âm thận
PC	手厥陰心包經	shǒu juéyīn xīnbāo jīng	Pericardium	수궐음심포경	Thủ quyết âm tâm bào
TE	手少陽三焦經	shǒu shǎo yángsān jiāo jīng	Triple Energizer	수소양삼초경	Thủ thiếu dương tam tiêu
GB	足少陽膽經	zú shǎo yáng dǎn jīng	Gallbladder	족소양담경	Túc thiếu dương đởm
LR	足厥陰肝經	zú juéyīn gān jīng	Liver	족궐음간경	Túc quyết âm can

=== Eight Extraordinary Meridians ===
The eight extraordinary meridians (simplified Chinese: 奇经八脉; traditional Chinese: 奇經八脈; pinyin: qí jīng bā mài) are of pivotal importance in the study of qigong, tai chi, and Chinese alchemy. Though many are listed, only the Governing Vessel and the Conception Vessel meridians have points not associated with the previous 12 meridians.

Code	Name	Transliteration	English	Korean 한글	Pinyin	Vietnamese
GV	督脉; 督脈	Dumai	Governing Vessel	독맥	dū mài	Đốc mạch
CV	任脉; 任脈	Renmai	Conception Vessel	임맥	rén mài	Nhâm mạch
TV	冲脉; 衝脈	Chongmai	Thrusting Vessel	충맥	chòng mài	Xung mạch
BV	带脉; 帶脈	Daimai	Belt Vessel	대맥	dài mài	Đới mạch
YinHV	陰跷脉; 陰蹺脈	Yinqiaomai	Yin Heel Vessel	음교맥	yīn qiāo mài	Âm kiều
YangHV	陽跷脉; 陽蹺脈	Yangqiaomai	Yang Heel Vessel	양교맥	yáng qiāo mài	Dương kiều
YinLV	陰维脉; 陰維脈	Yinweimai	Yin Link Vessel	음유맥	yīn wéi mài	Âm duy
YangLV	陽维脉; 陽維脈	Yangweimai	Yang Link Vessel	양유맥	yáng wéi mài	Dương duy

== Nomenclature ==
Some acupuncture points have several traditional names, for example tài yuān (太渊) and gui xin (鬼心) are two names used for the 9th acupuncture point on the lung meridian. The World Health Organization (WHO) published A Proposed Standard International Acupuncture Nomenclature Report in 1991 and 2014, listing 361 classical acupuncture points organized according to the fourteen meridians, eight extra meridians, 48 extra points, and scalp acupuncture points, and published Standard Acupuncture Nomenclature in 1993, focused on the 361 classical acupuncture points. Each acupuncture point is identified by the meridian on which it is located and its number in the point sequence on that channel. For example, Lu-9 identifies the 9th acupuncture point on the lung meridian. The only ambiguity with this unique systemized method is on the urinary bladder meridian, where the outer line of 14 points found on the back near the spine are inserted in one of two ways; following the last point of the inner line along the spine (會陽) and resuming with the point found in the crease of the buttocks (承扶), or following the point in the center of the crease of the knee (委中) and resuming with the point just below that (合陽), found in the bifurcation of the gastrocnemius muscle. Although classification of the extra points often tries to utilize a similar shortcut method, where a numbered sequence along an assigned body part is used, there is no commonly agreed-upon system and therefore universal identification of these points relies on the original naming system of traditional Chinese characters.

The tables in this article follow the WHO numbering scheme to identify the acupuncture points of the main channels. For extra points the tables follow the numbering scheme found in A Manual of Acupuncture.

== Lung meridian ==
Abbreviated as LU, named 手太阴肺经穴; 手太陰肺經 "The Lung channel of Hand, Greater Yin". This refers to the meridian starting in the arm, the lung's association with yin, and that it is considered more easy to find.

Point	Name	Transliteration	English	Pinyin	Korean 한글	Vietnamese
LU-1	中府	Zhongfu	Middle Assembly	zhōng fǔ	jung bu 중부	Trung phủ
LU-2	雲門	Yunmen	Cloud Gate	yún mén	un mun 운문	Vân môn
LU-3	天府	Tianfu	Upper Arm Assembly	tiān fǔ	cheon bu 천부	Thiên phủ
LU-4	俠白	Xiabai	Supporting the Lung	xiá bái	hyeop baek 협백	Hiệp bạch
LU-5	尺澤	Chize	Cubit Marsh	chǐ zé	cheok taek 척택	Xích trạch
LU-6	孔最	Kongzui	Collection Hole	kǒng zuì	gong choe 공최	Khổng tối
LU-7	列缺	Lieque	Interrupted Sequence	liè quē	yeol gyeol 열결	Liệt khuyết
LU-8	經渠	Jingqu	Channel Ditch	jīng qú	gyeong geo 경거	Kinh cừ
LU-9	太淵	Taiyuan	Great Deep Pool	tài yuān	tae yeon 태연	Thái uyên
LU-10	魚際	Yuji	Fish Border	yú jì	eo je 어제	Ngư tế
LU-11	少商	Shaoshang	Lesser Metal	shào shāng	so sang 소상	Thiếu thương

== Large intestine meridian ==
Abbreviated as LI or CO (colon), named 手阳明大肠经穴; 手陽明大腸經 "The Large Intestine channel of Hand, Yang Bright".

Point	Name	Transliteration	English	Pinyin	Korean 한글	Vietnamese
LI-1	商陽	Shangyang	Metal Yang	shāng yáng	sang yang 상양	Thương dương
LI-2	二間	Erjian	Second Point	èr jiān	i gan 이간	Nhị gian
LI-3	三間	Sanjian	Third Point	sān jiān	sam gan 삼간	Tam gian
LI-4	合谷	He Gu	Junction Valley	hé gǔ	hap gok 합곡	Hiệp cốc
LI-5	陽谿	Yangxi	Yang Stream	yáng xī	yang gye 양계	Dương khê
LI-6	偏歴	Pianli	Diverging Passage	piān lì	pyeon ryeok 편력	Thiên lịch
LI-7	溫溜	Wenliu	Warm Flow	wēn liū	ol lyu 온류	Ôn lưu
LI-8	下廉	Xialian	Lower Point at the Border	xià lián	ha ryeom 하렴	Hạ liêm
LI-9	上廉	Shanglian	Upper Point at the Border	shàng lián	sang nyeom 상렴	Thượng liêm
LI-10	手三里	Shousanli	Arm Three Miles	shǒu sān lǐ	[su] sam ni [수] 삼리	Thủ tam lý
LI-11	曲池	Quchi	Pool at the Bend	qū chí	gok ji 곡지	Khúc trì
LI-12	肘髎	Zhouliao	Elbow Bone Hole	zhǒu liáo	ju ryo 주료	Trữu liêu
LI-13	手五里	Shouwuli	Arm Five Miles	shǒu wǔ lǐ	[su] o ri [수] 오리	(Thủ) ngũ lý
LI-14	臂臑	Binao	Upper Arm	bì nào	bi no 비노	Tí nhu
LI-15	肩髃	Jianyu	Shoulder and Clavicle	jiān yú	gyeon u 견우	Kiên ngung
LI-16	巨骨	Jugu	Large Bone	jù gǔ	geo gol 거골	Ngự cốt
LI-17	天鼎	Tianding	Head's Tripod	tiān dǐng	cheon jeong 천정	Thiên đỉnh
LI-18	扶突	Futu	Beside the Prominence	fú tū	bu dol 부돌	Phù đột
LI-19	口禾髎	Kouheliao	Mouth Grain Hole	kǒu hé liáo	hwa ryo 화료	Hòa liêu
LI-20	迎香	Yingxiang	Receiving Fragrance	yíng xiāng	yeong hyang 영향	Nghênh hương

== Stomach meridian ==
Abbreviated as ST, named 足阳明胃经穴; 足陽明胃經 "The Stomach channel of Foot, Yang Bright".

Point	Name	Transliteration	English	Pinyin	Korean 한글	Vietnamese	Alternative names
ST-1	承泣	Chengqi	Tears Container	chéng qì	seung eup 승읍	Thừa khấp	
ST-2	四白	Sibai	Four Directions Brightness	sì bái	sa baek 사백	Tứ bạch	
ST-3	巨髎	Juliao	Large Bone Hole	jù liáo	geo ryo 거료	Cự liêu	
ST-4	地倉	Dicang	Earth Granary	dì cāng	ji chang 지창	Địa thương	
ST-5	大迎	Daying	Large Receptacle (Facial Artery)	dà yíng	dae yeong 대영	Đại nghênh	
ST-6	頰車	Jiache	Jaw Bone	jiá chē	hyeop geo 협거	Giáp xa	
ST-7	下關	Xiaguan	Below the Arch	xià guān	ha gwan 하관	Hạ quan	
ST-8	頭維	Touwei	Head's Corner	tóu wéi	du yu 두유	Đầu duy	
ST-9	人迎	Renying	Man'sPrognosis (Carotid Artery)	rén yíng	in yeong 인영	Nhân nghênh	Tianwuhui (Heaven's Five Meetings)
ST-10	水突	Shuitu	Liquid Passage	shǔi tū	su dol 수돌	Thủy đột	
ST-11	氣舍	Qishe	Residence of Breath Qi	qì shè	gi sa 기사	Khí xá	
ST-12	缺盆	Quepen	Empty Basin	quē pén	gyeol bun 결분	Khuyết bồn	
ST-13	氣戶	Qihu	Door of Breath	qì hù	gi ho 기호	Khí hộ	
ST-14	庫房	Kufang	Breath Storeroom	kù fáng	go bang 고방	Khố phòng	
ST-15	屋翳	Wuyi	Hiding the Breath	wū yì	ok ye 옥예	Ốc ế	
ST-16	膺窗	Yingchuang	Breast Window	yìng chuāng	eung chang 응창	Ưng song	
ST-17	乳中	Ruzhong	Breast Centre (Nipple)	rǔ zhōng	yu jung 유중	Nhũ trung	
ST-18	乳根	Rugen	Breast Root	rǔ gēn	yu geun 유근	Nhũ căn	
ST-19	不容	Burong	Not Contained	bù róng	bul yong 불용	Bất dung	"Uncontainable" refers to vomiting
ST-20	承滿	Chengman	Receiving Fullness	chéng mǎn	seng man 승만	Thừa mãn	
ST-21	梁門	Liangmen	Beam Gate	liáng mén	yang mun 양문	Lương môn	
ST-22	關門	Guanmen	Shutting the Gate	guān mén	gwan mun 관문	Quan môn	
ST-23	太乙	Taiyi	Great Unity	tài yǐ	tae eul 태을	Thái ất	
ST-24	滑肉門	Huaroumen	Chime Gate	huá ròu mén	hwal yung mun 활육문	Hoạt nhục môn	
ST-25	天樞	Tianshu	Heavenly Pivot	tiān shū	cheon chu 천추	Thiên xu	
ST-26	外陵	Wailing	Outer Mound	wài líng	woe neung 외릉	Ngoại lăng	
ST-27	大巨	Daju	Great Bulge	dà jù	dae geo 대거	Đại cự	
ST-28	水道	Shuidao	Waterway	shuǐ dào	su do 수도	Thủy đạo	Left ST 28 = Baomen "Gate of Uterus"; Right ST 28 = Zihu "Child's Door - Sun Si Miao
ST-29	歸來 (归来)	Guilai	Restoring Position	guī lái	gui rae 귀래	Qui lai	
ST-30	氣沖	Qichong	Qi Surge	qì chōng	gi chung 기충	Khí xung	
ST-31	髀關	Biguan	Thigh Gate	bì guān	bi gwan 비관	Bễ quan	
ST-32	伏兔	Futu	Crouching Rabbit	fú tù	bok to 복토	Phục thỏ	
ST-33	陰市	Yinshi	Yin Market	yīn shì	eum si 음시	Âm thị	
ST-34	梁丘	Liangqiu	Ridge Mound	liáng qīu	yang gu 양구	Lương khâu	
ST-35	犢鼻	Dubi	Calf's Nose	dú bí	dok bi 독비	Độc tị	
ST-36	足三里	Zusanli	Leg Three Miles	zú sān lǐ	[jok] sam ni [족] 삼리	Túc tam lý	
ST-37	上巨虛	Shangjuxu	Upper Great Void	shàng jù xū	sang geo heo 상거허	Thượng cự hư	
ST-38	條口	Tiaokou	Ribbon Opening	tiáo kǒu	jo gu 조구	Điều khẩu	
ST-39	下巨虛	Xiajuxu	Lower Large Hollow	xià jù xū	ha geo heo 하거허	Hạ cự hư	
ST-40	豐隆	Fenglong	Abundant Bulge	fēng lóng	pung nyung 풍륭	Phong long	
ST-41	解谿	Jiexi	Dividing Cleft	jiě xī	hae gye 해계	Giải khê	
ST-42	沖陽	Chongyang	Surging Yang	chōng yáng	chung yang 충양	Xung dương	
ST-43	陷谷	Xiangu	Sunken Valley	xiàn gǔ	ham gok 함곡	Hãm cốc	
ST-44	内庭	Neiting	Inner Court	nèi tíng	nae jeong 내정	Nội đình	
ST-45	厲兌	Lidui	Running Point	lì duì	ye tae 예태	Lệ đoài	

== Spleen meridian ==
Abbreviated as SP, named 足太阴睥经穴; 足太陰脾經 "The Spleen channel of Foot, Greater Yin".

Point	Name	Transliteration	English	Pinyin	Korean 한글	Romaji	Vietnamese	Alternative names
SP-1	隱白	Yinbai	Hidden White	yǐn bái	eun baek 은백	im paku	Ẩn bạch	'in paku'
SP-2	大都	Dadu	Great Pool	dà dū	dae do 대도	dai to	Đại đô	
SP-3	太白	Taibai	Great White	taì bái	tae baek 태백	tai haku	Thái bạch	
SP-4	公孫	Gongsun	Grandfather Grandson	gōng sūn	gong son 공손	kō son	Công tôn	
SP-5	商丘	Shangqiu	Metal Mound	shāng qiū	sang gu 상구	shō kyū	Thương khâu	
SP-6	三陰交	Sanyinjiao	Three Yin Intersection	sān yīn jiāo	sam eum gyo 삼음교	san in kō	Tam âm giao	
SP-7	漏谷	Lougu	Leaking Valley	loù gǔ	nu gok 루곡	rō koku?	Lậu cốc	
SP-8	地機	Diji	Earth Cure	dì jī	ji gi 지기	chi ki	Địa cơ	
SP-9	陰陵泉	Yinlingquan	Yin Mound Spring	yīn líng qúan	eum neung cheon 음릉천	in ryō sen	Âm lăng tuyền	
SP-10	血海	Xuehai	Sea of Blood	xuè hǎi	hyeol hae 혈해	kek kai	Huyết hải	
SP-11	箕門	Jimen	Separation Gate	jī mén	gi mun 기문	ki mon	Cơ môn	
SP-12	衝門	Chongmen	Surging Gate	chōng mén	chung mun 충문	shō mon	Xung môn	
SP-13	府舍	Fushe	Bpwel Abode	fǔ shè	bu sa 부사	fu sha	Phủ xá	
SP-14	腹結	Fujie	Abdomen Stagnation	fù jié	bok gyeol 복결	fuk ketsu	Phúc kết	
SP-15	大横	Da heng	Great Horizontal	dà héng	dae hoeng 대횡	dai ō	Đại hoành	
SP-16	腹哀	Fuai	Abdomen Suffering	fù āi	bok ae 복애	fuku ai	Phúc ai	
SP-17	食竇	Shidou	Food Cavity	shí dòu	sik du 식두	shoku tō	Thực đậu	
SP-18	天谿	Tianxi	Celestial Cleft	tiān xī	cheon gye 천계	ten kei	Thiên khê	
SP-19	胸鄉	Xiongxiang	Chest Village	xiōng xiāng	hyung hyang 흉향	kyō kyō?	Hung hương	
SP-20	周榮	Zhourong	Complete Nourishment	zhōu róng	ju yeong 주영	shū ei	Chu vinh	
SP-21	大包	Dabao	Great Embrace	dà bāo	dae po 대포	tai hō	Đại bao	

== Heart meridian ==
Abbreviated as HE, HT or H, named 手少阴心经穴; 手少陰心經 "The Heart channel of Hand, Lesser Yin".

Point	Name	Transliteration	English	Pinyin	Korean 한글	Romaji	Vietnamese	Alternative names
HE-1	極泉	Jiquan	Highest Spring	jí quán	geuk cheon 극천	kyoku sen	Cực tuyền	
HE-2	青靈	Qingling	Green Spirit	qīng líng	cheong nyeong 청령	sei rei(?)	Thanh linh	
HE-3	少海	Shaohai	Lesser Sea	shào hǎi	so hae 소해	shō kai	Thiếu hải	
HE-4	靈道	Lingdao	Spirit Path	líng dào	young do 영도	rei dō?	Linh đạo	
HE-5	通里	Tongli	Inward Connection	tōng lǐ	tong ni 통리	tsū ri?	Thông lý	
HE-6	陰郄	Yinxi	Yin Cleft	yīn xī	eum geuk 음극	in geki	Âm khích	
HE-7	神門	Shenmen	Spirit Gate	shén mén	sin mun 신문	shin mon	Thần môn	
HE-8	少府	Shaofu	Lesser Mansion	shào fǔ	so bu 소부	shō fu?	Thiếu phủ	
HE-9	少沖	Shaochong	Lesser Surge	shào chōng	so chung 소충	shō shō	Thiếu xung	

== Small intestine meridian ==
Abbreviated as SI, named 手太阳小肠经穴; 手太陽小腸經 "The Small Intestine channel of Hand, Greater Yang".

Point	Name	Transliteration	English	Pinyin	Korean 한글	Romaji	Vietnamese	Alternative names
SI-1	少澤	Shaoze	Lesser Marsh	shào zé	so taek 소택	shō taku	Thiếu trạch	
SI-2	前谷	Qiangu	Front Valley	qián gǔ	jeon gok 전곡	zen koku(?)	Tiền cốc	
SI-3	後谿	Houxi	Back Stream	hòu xī	hu gye 후계	go kei	Hậu khê	'kō kei'
SI-4	腕骨	Wangu	Wrist Bone	wàn gǔ	wan gol 완골	wan kotsu(?)	Uyển cốt	
SI-5	陽谷	Yanggu	Yang Valley	yáng gǔ	yang gok 양곡	yō koku	Dương cốc	
SI-6	養老	Yanglao	Support the Aged	yǎng lǎo	yang no 양노	yō rō	Dưỡng lão	
SI-7	支正	Zhizheng	Branch of Upright	zhī zhèng	ji jeong 지정	shi sei(?)	Chi chính	
SI-8	小海	Xiaohai	Small Sea	xiǎo hǎi	so hae 소해	shō kai	Tiểu hải	
SI-9	肩貞	Jianzhen	True Shoulder	jiān zhēn	gyeon jeong 견정	ken tei	Kiên trinh	
SI-10	臑俞	Naoshu	Upper arm transporter	nāo shū	no yu(su) 노유(수)	ju yu	Nhu du	
SI-11	天宗	Tianzong	Heavenly Gathering	tiān zōng	cheon jong 천종	ten sō	Thiên tông	
SI-12	秉風	Bingfeng	Grasping the Wind	bǐng fēng	byeong pung 병풍	hei fū	Bỉnh phong	
SI-13	曲垣	Quyuan	Crooked Wall	qū yuán	gok won 곡원	kyo ku en?	Khúc viên	
SI-14	肩外俞	Jianwaishu	Outer Shoulder Transporter	jiān wài shū	gyeon oe yu 견외유	ken gai yu(?)	Kiên ngoại du	
SI-15	肩中俞	Jianzhongshu	Middle Shoulder Transporter	jiān zhōng shū	gyeon jung yu 견중유	ken chū yu?	Kiên trung du	
SI-16	天窗	Tianchuang	Heavenly Window	tiān chuāng	cheon chang 천창	ten sō?	Thiên song	
SI-17	天容	Tianrong	Heavenly Appearance	tiān róng	cheon yong 천용	ten yō?	Thiên dung	
SI-18	顴髎	Quanliao	Cheek Bone Crevice	quán liáo	gwal lyo 관료	kan ryō	Quyền liêu	
SI-19	聽宮	Tinggong	Palace of Hearing	tīng gōng	cheong gung 청궁	chō kyū	Thính cung	

== Bladder meridian ==
Abbreviated as BL or UB (urinary bladder), described in Chinese as 足太阳膀胱经穴; 足太陽膀胱經 "The Bladder channel of Foot, Greater Yang".

An alternative numbering scheme for the "appended part" (beginning with Bl-41 in the list below), which places the outer line along the spine after Bl-35 (會陽) instead of Bl-40 (委中), will be noted in the Alternative names column.

Point	Name	Transliteration	English	Pinyin	Korean 한글	Romaji	Vietnamese	Alternative names
BL-1	睛明	Jingming	Bright Eyes	jīng míng	jeong myeong 정명	sei mei	Tình minh	
BL-2	攢竹	Zanzhu	Gathered Bamboo	cuán zhú	chan juk 찬죽	san chiku	Toản trúc	
BL-3	眉衝	Meichong	Eyebrows' Ascension	méi chōng	mi chung 미충	bi shō	Mi xung	
BL-4	曲差	Quchai	Deviating Curve	qǔ chāi	gok cha 곡차	kyo kusa?	Khúc sai	
BL-5	五處	Wuchu	Fifth Position	wǔ chǔ	o cheo 오처	go sho(?)	Ngũ xứ	
BL-6	承光	Chengguang	Receiving Light	chéng guāng	seung gwang 승광	shō kō?	Thừa quang	
BL-7	通天	Tongtian	Reaching Upward	tōng tiān	tong cheon 통천	tsū ten	Thông thiên	
BL-8	絡卻	Luoque	Declining Connection	luò què	nak gak 락각	rak kyaku?	Lạc khước	
BL-9	玉枕	Yuzhen	Jade Pillow	yù zhěn	ok chim 옥침	gyoku chin(?)	Ngọc chẩm	
BL-10	天柱	Tianzhu	Upper Pillar	tiān zhù	cheon ju 천주	ten chū	Thiên trụ	
BL-11	大杼	Dazhu	Great Vertebra	dà zhù	dae jeo 대저	dai jo	Đại trữ	
BL-12	風門	Fengmen	Wind Gate	fēng mén	pung mun 풍문	fū mon	Phong môn	
BL-13	肺俞	Feishu	Lung Transporter	fèi shū	pye yu 폐유	hai yu	Phế du	
BL-14	厥陰俞	Jueyinshu	Absolute yin Transporter	jué yīn shū	gweor eum yu 궐음유	ketsu in yu	Quyết âm du	
BL-15	心俞	Xinshu	Heart Transporter	xīn shū	sim yu 심유	shin yu	Tâm du	
BL-16	督俞	Dushu	Governor Transporter	dū shū	dok yu 독유	toku yu	Đốc du	
BL-17	膈俞	Geshu	Diaphragm Transporter	gé shū	gyeok yu 격유	kaku yu	Cách du	
BL-18	肝俞	Ganshu	Liver Transporter	gān shū	gan yu 간유	kan yu	Can du	
BL-19	膽俞	Danshu	Gallbladder Transporter	dǎn shū	dam yu 담유	tan yu	Đởm du	
BL-20	脾俞	Pishu	Spleen Transporter	pí shū	bi yu 비유	hi yu	Tỳ du	
BL-21	胃俞	Weishu	Stomach Transporter	wèi shū	wi yu 위유	i yu	Vị du	
BL-22	三焦俞	Sanjiaoshu	Sanjiao Transporter	sān jiāo shū	sam cho yu 삼초유	san shō yu	Tam tiêu du	
BL-23	腎俞	Shenshu	Kidney Transporter	shèn shū	sim yu 신유	jin yu	Thận du	
BL-24	氣海俞	Qihaishu	Sea of Qi Transporter	qì hǎi shū	gi hae yu 기해유	kikai yu?	Khí hải du	
BL-25	大腸俞	Dachangshu	Large Intestine Transporter	dà cháng shū	dae jang yu 대장유	dai chō yu	Đại trường du	
BL-26	關元俞	Guanyuanshu	Gate of Origin Transporter	guān yuán shū	gwan won yu 관원유	kan gen yu?	Quan nguyên du	
BL-27	小腸俞	Xiaochangshu	Small Intestine Transporter	xiǎo cháng shū	so jang yu 소장유	shō chō yu	Tiểu trường du	
BL-28	膀胱俞	Pangguangshu	Bladder Transporter	páng guāng shū	bang wang yu 방광유	bōkō yu	Bàng quang du	
BL-29	中膂俞	Zhonglushu	Mid-Spine Transporter	zhōng lǚ shū	jung nyeo nae yu 중려내유	chū ryo yu?	Trung lữ du	中膂內俞 zhōng lǚ nèi shù
BL-30	白環俞	Baihuanshu	White Ring Transporter	bái huán shū	baek hwan yu 백환유	hak kan yu?	Bạch hoàn du	
BL-31	上髎	Shangliao	Upper Bone Hole	shàng liáo	sang nyo 상료	jyō ryō?	Thượng liêu	
BL-32	次髎	Ciliao	Second Bone Hole	cì liáo	cha ryo 차료	ji ryō	Thứ liêu	
BL-33	中髎	Zhongliao	Middle Bone Hole	zhōng liáo	jung nyo 중료	chū ryō?	Trung liêu	
BL-34	下髎	Xialiao	Lower Bone Hole	xià liáo	ha ryo 하료	ge ryō?	Hạ liêu	
BL-35	會陽	Huiyang	Meeting of Yang	huì yáng	hoe yang 회양	e yō	Hội dương	
BL-36	承扶	Chengfu	Hold and Support	chéng fú	seung bu 승부	sho fu(?)	Thừa phù	Bl-50
BL-37	殷門	Yinmen	Hanstring Gate	yīn mén	eun mun 은문	in mon	Ân môn	Bl-51
BL-38	浮郄	Fuxi	Superficial Cleft	fú xī	bu geuk 부극	fu geki(?)	Phù khích	Bl-52
BL-39	委陽	Weiyang	Lateral End of the Crease	wěi yáng	wi yang 위양	i yō	Ủy dương	Bl-53
BL-40	委中	Weizhong	Middle of the Crease	wěi zhōng	wi jung 위중	i chū	Ủy trung	Bl-54
BL-41	附分	Fufen	Outer Branch	fù fēn	bu bun 부분	fu bun(?)	Phụ phân	Bl-36
BL-42	魄戶	Pohu	Door of the Corporeal Soul	pò hù	baek ho 백호	haku ko	Phách hộ	Bl-37
BL-43	膏肓俞	Gaohuangshu	Vital Region Shu	gāo huāng shū	go hwang [yu] 고황[유]	kō kō yu	Cao hoang du	Bl-38
BL-44	神堂	Shentang	Spirit Hall	shén táng	sin dang 신당	shin dō?	Thần đường	Bl-39
BL-45	譩譆	Yixi	That Hurt	yì xǐ	ui hoe 의회	i ki(?)	Y hy	Bl-40
BL-46	膈關	Geguan	Diaphragm Gate	gé guān	gyeok gwan 격관	kaku kan(?)	Cách quan	Bl-41
BL-47	魂門	Hunmen	Ethereal Soul Gate	hún mén	hon mun 혼문	kon mon?	Hồn môn	Bl-42
BL-48	陽綱	Yanggang	Linking to Gall Bladder	yáng gāng	yang gang 양강	yō kō?	Dương cương	Bl-43
BL-49	意舍	Yishe	Abode of Thought	yì shě	ui sa 의사	i sha(?)	Ý xá	Bl-44
BL-50	胃倉	Weicang	Stomach Granary	wèi cāng	wi chang 위창	i sō	Vị thương	Bl-45
BL-51	肓門	Huangmen	Vitals Gate	huāng mén	hwang mun 황문	kō mon?	Hoang môn	Bl-46
BL-52	志室	Zhishi	Willpower Room	zhì shì	ji sil 지실	shi shitsu	Chí thất	Bl-47
BL-53	胞肓	Baohuang	Bladder's Vitals	bāo huāng	po hwang 포황	hō kō	Bào hoang	Bl-48
BL-54	秩邊	Zhibian	Lowermost in Order	zhì biān	jil byeon 질변	chip pen	Trật biên	Bl-49
BL-55	合陽	Heyang	Yang Confluence	hé yáng	hap yang 합양	gō yō?	Hợp dương	
BL-56	承筋	Chengjin	Sinews Support	chéng jīn	seung geun 승근	shō kin	Thừa cân	
BL-57	承山	Chengshan	Mountain Support	chéng shān	seung san 승산	shō zan	Thừa sơn	
BL-58	飛陽	Feiyang	Taking Flight	fēi yáng	bi yang 비양	hi yō	Phi dương	
BL-59	跗陽	Fuyang	Tarsus Yang	fū yáng	bu yang 부양	fu yō	Phụ dương	
BL-60	昆侖; 崑崙	Kunlun	Kunlun Mountains	kūn lún	gol lyun 곤륜	kon ron	Côn lôn (luân)	
BL-61	僕參	Pucan	Subservient Visitor	pú cān	bok cham 복참	boku shin(?)	Bộc tham	
BL-62	申脈	Shenmai	Extending Vessel	shēn mài	sin maek 신맥	shim myaku	Thân mạch	
BL-63	金門	Jinmen	Golden Gate	jīn mén	geum mun 금문	kim mon	Kim môn	
BL-64	京骨	Jinggu	Metatarsal Tuberosity	jīng gǔ	gyeong gol 경골	kei kotsu(?)	Kinh cốt	
BL-65	束骨	Shugu	Metatarsal Head	shù gǔ	sok gol 속골	sok kotsu?	Thúc cốt	
BL-66	足通谷	Zutonggu	Foot Valley Passage	zú tōng gǔ	[jok] tong gok [족]통곡	ahsi tsū koku?	Túc thông cốc	
BL-67	至陰	Zhiyin	Reaching Yin	zhì yīn	ji eum 지음	shi in	Chí âm	

== Kidney meridian ==
Abbreviated as KI or K, described in Chinese as 足少阴肾经穴 or 足少陰腎經 "The Kidney channel of Foot, Lesser Yin".

Point	Name	Transliteration	English	Pinyin	Korean 한글	Romaji	Vietnamese
KI-1	湧泉	Yong Quan	Bubbling Well	yǒng quán	yong cheon 용천	yu sen	Dũng tuyền
KI-2	然谷	Rangu	Blazing Valley	rán gǔ	yeon gok 연곡	nen koku	Nhiên cốc
KI-3	太谿	Taixi	Great Stream	taì xī	tae yeon 태계	tai kei	Thái khê
KI-4	大鐘	Dazhong	Large Bell	dà zhōng	dae jong 대종	dai shō?	Đại chung
KI-5	水泉	Shuiquan	Water Spring	shuǐ quán	su cheon 수천	sui sen	Thủy tuyền
KI-6	照海	Zhaohai	Shining Sea	zhào hǎi	joh hae 조해	shō kai	Chiếu hải
KI-7	復溜	Fuliu	Continuing Flow	fù liū	bong nyu 복류	fuku ryū	Phục lưu
KI-8	交信	Jiaoxin	Intersecting with Spleen	jiāo xìn	gyo sin 교신	kō shin?	Giao tín
KI-9	築賓	Zhubin	Strong Knees	zhú bīn	chuk bin 축빈	chiku hin	Trúc tân
KI-10	陰谷	Yingu	Yin Valley	yīn gǔ	eum gok 음곡	in koku	Âm cốc
KI-11	橫骨	Henggu	Pubic Bone	héng gǔ	hoeng gol 횡골	ō kotsu	Hoành cốt
KI-12	大赫	Dahe	Big Plentifulness	dà hè	dae hyeok 대혁	tai kaku	Đại hách
KI-13	氣穴	Qixue	Kidney Qi Cave	qì xué	gi hyeol 기혈	ki ketsu	Khí huyệt
KI-14	四滿	Siman	Fourth for Fullnesses	sì mǎn	sa man 사만	shi man	Tứ mãn
KI-15	中注	Zhongzhu	Pouring into the Middle	zhōng zhù	jung ju 중주	chū chū	Trung chú
KI-16	肓俞	Huangshu	Vitals Tissues Shu	huāng shū	hwang yu 황유	kō yu	Hoang du
KI-17	商曲	Shangqu	Metal Bend	shāng qū	sang gok 상곡	shō kyoku	Thương khúc
KI-18	石關	Shiguan	Stone Gate	shí guān	seok gwan 석관	seki kan	Thạch quan
KI-19	陰都	Yindu	Yin Metropolis	yīn dū	eum do 음도	in to	Âm đô
KI-20	腹通谷	Futonggu	Abdominal Food Passage	fù tōng gǔ	tong gok 통곡	hara no tsū koku	(Phúc) Thông cốc
KI-21	幽門	Youmen	Hidden Gate	yōu mén	yu mun 유문	yū mon	U môn
KI-22	步廊	Bulang	Stepping Upwards	bù láng	bo rang 보랑	hō ro?	Bộ lang
K-23	神封	Shenfeng	Spirit Manor	shén fēng	sin bong 신봉	shim pō	Thần phong
KI-24	靈墟	Lingxu	Spirit Ruin	líng xū	yeong heo 영허	rei kyo(?)	Linh khâu
KI-25	神藏	Shencang	Spirit Storehouse	shén cáng	sin jang 신장	shin zō	Thần tàng
KI-26	彧中 (Note: Also called 或中 huò zhōng, but this is an obvious mistranscription)	Yuzhong	Refined Chest	yù zhōng	uk jung 욱중	waku chū	Hoắc trung
KI-27	俞府	Shufu	Shu Mansion	shū fǔ	yu bu 유부	yu fu	Du phủ

== Pericardium meridian ==
Abbreviated as PC or P, named 手厥阴心包经穴; 手厥陰心包經 "The Pericardium channel of Hand, Faint Yin".

Point	Name	Transliteration	English	Pinyin	Korean 한글	Romaji	Vietnamese	Alternative names
PC-1	天池	Tianchi	Heavenly Pool	tiān chí	cheon ji 천지	ten chi	Thiên trì	
PC-2	天泉	Tianquan	Heavenly Spring	tiān quán	cheon cheon 천천	ten sen(?)	Thiên tuyền	
PC-3	曲澤	Quze	Marsh at the Crook	qū zé	gok taek 곡택	kyoku taku(?)	Khúc trạch	
PC-4	郄門	Ximen	Xi-Cleft Gate	xī mén	geung mun 극문	geki mon	Khích môn	
PC-5	間使	Jianshi	Intermediate Messenger	jiān shǐ	gan sa 간사	kan shi(?)	Giản sử	
PC-6	內關	Neiguan	Inner Pass	nèi guān	nae gwan 내관	nai kan	Nội quan	
PC-7	大陵	Daling	Great Mound	dà líng	dae reung 대릉	dai ryō	Đại lăng	'tai ryō'
PC-8	勞宮	Laogong	Palace of Toil	láo gōng	no gung 노궁	rō kyū	Lao cung	
PC-9	中衝	Zhongchong	Middle Rushing	zhōng chōng	jung chung 중충	chū shō	Trung xung	

== Triple burner meridian ==
Also known as San Jiao, triple-heater, triple-warmer or triple-energizer, abbreviated as TB or SJ or TE and named 手少阳三焦经穴; 手少陽三焦經 "The Sanjiao channel of Hand, Lesser Yang".

Point	Name	Transliteration	English	Pinyin	Korean 한글	Romaji	Vietnamese	Alternative names
TE-1	關衝	Guanchong	Surge Gate	guān chōng	gwan chung 관충	kan shō	Quan xung	
TE-2	液門	Yemen	Fluid Gate	yè mén	aeng mun 액문	eki mon(?)	DỊch môn	
TE-3	中渚	Zhongzhu	Central Islet	zhōng zhǔ	jung jeo 중저	chū sho	Trung chử	
TE-4	陽池	Yangchi	Yang Pool	yáng chí	yang ji 양지	yō chi?	Dương trì	
TE-5	外關	Waiguan	Outer Pass	wài guān	oe gwan 외관	gai kan	Ngoại quan	
TE-6	支溝	Zhigou	Branch Ditch	zhī gōu	ji gu 지구	shi kō?	Chi câu	
TE-7	會宗	Huizong	Convergence and Gathering	huì zōng	hui jung 회종	e sō	Hội tông	
TE-8	三陽絡	Sanyangluo	Three Yang Connection	sān yáng luò	sam yang nak 삼양락	san kyō raku?	Tam dương lạc	
TE-9	四瀆	Sidu	Four Rivers	sì dú	sa dok 사독	shi toku	Tứ độc	
TE-10	天井	Tianjing	Upper Well	tiān jǐng	cheon jeong 천정	ten sei(?)	Thiên tỉnh	TW 10
TE-11	清冷淵	Qinglengyuan	Cooling Deep Pool	qīng lěng yuān	cheong naeng yeon 청랭연	sei rei en?	Thanh lãng uyên	
TE-12	消濼	Xiaoluo	Draining Marsh	xiāo luò	so rak 소락	shō reki?	Tiêu lạc	
TE-13	臑會	Naohui	Upper Arm Intersection	nào huì	noe hui 뇌회	ju e	Nhu hội	
TE-14	肩髎	Jianliao	Shoulder Bone Hole	jiān liáo	gyeol lyo 견료	ken ryō	Kiên liêu	
TE-15	天髎	Tianliao	Upper Arm Hole	tiān liáo	cheol lyo 천료	ten ryō	Thiên liêu	
TE-16	天牖	Tianyou	Sky Window	tiān yǒu	cheon yong 천용	ten yū?	Thiên dũ	
TE-17	翳風	Yifeng	Wind Screen	yì fēng	ye pung 예풍	ei fū	Ế phong	
TE-18	契脈	Qimai (Note: First character means qì/qī (contract/spasm))	Convulsion Vessel	qì mài	gye maek 계맥	kei myaku(?)	Khế mạch	
TE-19	顱息	Luxi	Head's Tranquility	lú xī	no sik 노식	ro soku(?)	Lư tức	
TE-20	角孫	Jiaosun	Angle Vertex	jiǎo sūn	gak son 각손	kaku son	Giác tôn	
TE-21	耳門	Ermen	Ear Gate	ěr mén	i mun 이문	ji mon(?)	Nhĩ môn	
TE-22	耳和髎	Erheliao	Ear Harmonising Foramen	ěr hé liáo	hwa ryo 화료	ji wa ryō?	(Nhĩ) Hòa liêu	
TE-23	絲竹空	Sizhukong	Silken Bamboo Hollow	sī zhú kōng	sa juk gong 사죽공	shi chiku kū	Ti trúc không	

== Gallbladder meridian ==
Abbreviated as GB, this meridian is named 足少阳胆经穴; 足少陽膽經 "The Gallbladder channel of Foot, Lesser Yang".

Point	Name	Transliteration	English	Pinyin	Korean 한글	Romaji	Vietnamese
GB-1	瞳子髎	Tongziliao	Pupil Crevice	tóng zǐ liáo	dong ja ryo 동자료	dō shi ryō	Đồng tử liêu
GB-2	聽會	Tinghui	Meeting of Hearing	tīng huì	cheong hoe 청회	chō e	Thính hội
GB-3	上關 (Note: also called 客主人 kè zhǔ rén)	Shangguan	Above the Joint	shàng guān	sang gwan 상관/gaek ju in 객주인	kyaku shu jin	Thượng quan
GB-4	頷厭	Hanyan	Jaw Serenity	hàn yàn	ha yeom 함염	gan en	Hàm yến
GB-5	懸顱	Xuanlu	Suspended Skull	xuán lú	hyeol lo 현로	ken ro	Huyền lư
GB-6	懸厘	Xuanli	Suspended Hair/tidbit	xuán lí	hyeol li 현리	ken ri	Huyền ly
GB-7	曲鬢	Qubin	Crook of the Temple	qū bìn	gok bin 곡빈	kyoku bin(?)	Khúc tân
GB-8	率谷	Shuaigu	Leading Valley	shuài gǔ	sol gok 솔곡	sok koku?	Suất cốc
GB-9	天沖	Tianchong	Heavenly Surge	tiān chōng	cheon chung 천충	ten shō?	Thiên xung
GB-10	浮白	Fubai	Floating White	fú bái	bu baek 부백	fu haku(?)	Phù bạch
GB-11	頭竅陰	Touqiaoyin	Yin Portals of the Head	tóu qiào yīn	[du] gyu eum [두] 규음	atama kyō in	Đầu khiếu âm
GB-12	完骨	Wangu	Mastoid Process	wán gǔ	wan gol 완골	kan kotsu	Hoàn cốt
GB-13	本神	Benshen	Root of the Spirit	běn shén	bon sin 본신	hon jin	Bản thần
GB-14	陽白	Yangbai	Yang White	yáng bái	yang baek 양백	yō haku	Dương bạch
GB-15	頭臨泣	Toulinqi	Head on the Verge of Tears	tóu lín qì	[du] im eup [두] 임읍	atama no rin kyū	Đầu lâm khấp
GB-16	目窗	Muchuang	Window of the Eye	mù chuāng	mok chang 목창	moku sō	Mục song
GB-17	正營	Zhengying	Upright Nutrition	zhèng yíng	jyeong yeong 정영	shō ei	Chính dinh
GB-18	承靈	Chengling	Support Spirit	chéng líng	seung nyeong 승령	shō rei	Thừa linh
GB-19	腦空	Naokong	Brain Hollow	nǎo kōng	noe gong 뇌공	nō kū	Não không
GB-20	風池	Fengchi	Wind Pool	fēng chí	pung ji 풍지	fū chi	Phong trì
GB-21	肩井	Jianjing	Shoulder Well	jīan jǐng	gyeon jeong 견정	ken sei	Kiên tỉnh
GB-22	淵腋	Yuanye	Armpit Abyss	yuān yè	yeon aek 연액	en eki(?)	Uyển dịch
GB-23	輒筋	Zhejin	Flank Sinews	zhé jīn	cheop geun 첩근	chō kin?	Triếp cân
GB-24	日月	Riyue	Sun and Moon	rì yuè	il weol 일월	jitsu getsu	Nhật nguyệt
GB-25	京門	Jingmen	Capital Gate	jīng mén	gyeong mun 경문	kei mon	Kinh môn
GB-26	帶脈	Daimai	Girdling Vessel	dài mài	dae maek 대맥	tai myaku	Đới mạch
GB-27	五樞	Wushu	Five Pivots	wǔ shū	o chu 오추	gō sū	Ngũ khu
GB-28	維道	Weidao	Linking Path	wéi dào	yu do 유도	yui dō	Duy đạo
GB-29	居髎	Juliao	Stationary Crevice	jū liáo	geo ryo 거료	kyo ryō	Cự liêu
GB-30	環跳	Huantiao	Jumping Circle	huán tiào	hwan do 환도	kan chō	Hoàn khiêu
GB-31	風市	Fengshi	Wind Market	fēng shì	pung si 풍시	fū shi	Phong thị
GB-32	中瀆	Zhongdu	Middle Ditch	zhōng dú	jung dok 중독	chū toku?	Trung độc
GB-33	膝陽關	Xiyangguan	Knee Yang Gate	xī yáng guān	[seul] yang gwan [슬] 양관	hiza no yō kan?	(Tất) Dương quan
GB-34	陽陵泉	Yanglingquan	Yang Mound Spring	yáng líng quán	yang neung cheon 양릉천	yō ryō sen	Dương lăng tuyền
GB-35	陽交	Yangjiao	Yang Intersection	yáng jiāo	yang gyo 양교	yō ko	Dương giao
GB-36	外丘	Waiqiu	Outer Hill	wài qiū	woe gu 외구	gai kyū	Ngoại khâu
GB-37	光明	Guangming	Bright Light	guāng míng	gwang myeong 광명	kō mei?	Quang minh
GB-38	陽輔	Yangfu	Yang Assistance	yáng fǔ	yang bo 양보	yō ho	Dương phụ
GB-39	懸鐘 (Note: also called 絶骨 jué gǔ)	Xuanzhong	Suspended Bell	xuán zhōng	hyeon jong 현종/jeol gol 절골	ken shō	Huyền chung
GB-40	丘墟	Qiuxu	Mound of Ruins	qiū xū	gu heo 구허	kyū kyo	Khâu khư
GB-41	足臨泣	Zulinqi	Foot on the Verge of Tears	zú lín qì	[jok] im eup [족] 임읍	ashi no rin kyū	Túc lâm khấp
GB-42	地五會	Diwuhui	Earth Five Meetings	dì wǔ huì	ji o hoe 지오회	chi go e(?)	Địa ngũ hội
GB-43	俠谿	Xiaxi	Clamped Stream	xiá xī	hyeop gye 협계	kyō kei?	Hiệp khê
GB-44	足竅陰	Zuqiaoyin	Yin Portals of the Foot	zú qiào yīn	[jok] gyu eum [족] 규음	ashi no kyō in	Túc khiếu âm

== Liver meridian ==
Abbreviated as LR or LV, named 足厥阴肝经穴; 足厥陰肝經 "The Liver channel of Foot, Faint Yin".

Point	Name	Transliteration	Pinyin	English	Korean 한글	Romaji	Vietnamese	Alternative names
LR-1	大敦	Dadun	dà dūn	Great and Thick	dae don 대돈	tai ton	Đại đôn	
LR-2	行間	Xingjian	xíng jiān	Interval Pass	haeng gan 행간	kō kan	Hành gian	
LR-3	太沖	Taichong	taì chōng	Supreme Rush	tae chung 태충	tai shō	Thái xung	
LR-4	中封	Zhongfeng	zhōng fēng	Middle Margin	jung bong 중봉	chū hō	Trung phong	
LR-5	蠡溝	Ligou	lǐ gōu	Gnawed Channel	yeo gu 여구	rei kō	Lãi câu	
LR-6	中都	Zhongdu	zhōng dū	Central Capital	jung do 중도	chū to	Trung đô	
LR-7	膝關	Xiguan	xī guān	Knee Pass	seul gwan 슬관	shitsu kan	Tất quan	
LR-8	曲泉	Ququan	qū quán	Pool Spring	gok cheon 곡천	kyoku sen	Khúc tuyền	
LR-9	陰包	Yinbao	yīn bāo	Yin Wrapping	eum bo 음보	im pō?	Âm bao	
LR-10	足五里	Zuwuli	zú wǔ li	Foot Governor of Tears	[jok] o ri [족] 오리	ashi no go ri?	(Túc) Ngũ lý	
LR-11	陰廉	Yinlian	yīn lián	Yin Side	eum yeom 음염	in ren(?)	Âm liêm	
LR-12	急脈	Jimai	jí mài	Rapid Pulse	geum maek 금맥	kyū myaku?	Cấp mạch	
LR-13	章門	Zhangmen	zhāng mén	Gate of the Ordering	jang mun 장문	shō mon	Chương môn	
LR-14	期門	Qimen	qí mén	Cyclic Gate	gi mun 기문	ki mon	Kỳ môn	

== Governing vessel ==
Also known as Du, abbreviated as GV and named 督脉穴; 督脈 "The Governing Vessel".

Point	Name	Transliteration	Pinyin	English	Korean 한글	Romaji	Vietnamese	Alternative names
GV-1	長強	Changqiang	cháng qiáng	Long and Rigid	jang gang 장강	chō kyō	Trường cường	
GV-2	腰俞	Yaoshu	yāo shū	Low Back Transporter	yo yu 요유	yō yu?	Yêu du	
GV-3	腰陽關	Yaoyangquan	yāo yáng guān	Low Back Yang Passage	[yo] yang gwan [요] 양관	koshi no yo kan?	(Yêu) Dương quan	
GV-4	命門	Mingmen	mìng mén	Life Gate	myeong mun 명문	mei mon	Mệnh môn	
GV-5	懸樞	Xuanshu	xuán shū	Suspended Pivot	hyeon chu 현추	ken sū?	Huyền khu	
GV-6	脊中	Jizhong	jì zhōng	Middle of the Spine	cheok jung 척중	seki chū?	Tích trung	
GV-7	中樞	Zhongshu	zhōng shū	Central Pivot	jung chu 중추	chū sū?	Trung khu	
GV-8	筋縮	Jinsuo	jīn suō	Muscle Spasm	geun chuk 근축	kin shuku(?)	Cân súc	
GV-9	至陽	Zhiyang	zhì yáng	Reaching Yang	ji yang 지양	shi yō?	Chí dương	
GV-10	靈台	Lingtai	líng tái	Spirit Platform	yeong dae 영대	rei dai(?)	Linh đài	
GV-11	神道	Shendao	shén dào	Way of the Spirit	sin do 신도	shin dō	Thần đạo	
GV-12	身柱	Shenzhu	shēn zhù	Body Pillar	sin ju 신주	shin chū	Thân trụ	
GV-13	陶道	Taodao	táo dào	Way of the Pot	do do 도도	tō dō?	Đào đạo	
GV-14	大椎	Dazhui	dà zhuī	Great Vertebra	dae chu 대추	dai tsui	Đại chùy	
GV-15	瘂門 (啞門)	Yamen	yǎ mén	Mutism Gate	a mun 아문	a mon	Á môn	
GV-16	風府	Fengfu	fēng fǔ	Wind Palace	pung bu 풍부	fū fu	Phong phủ	
GV-17	腦戶	Naohu	nǎo hù	Brain Door	noe ho 뇌호	nō ko?	Não hộ	
GV-18	強間	Qiangjian	qiáng jiān	Rigid Space	gang gan 강간	kyō kan?	Cường gian	
GV-19	後頂	Houding	hòu dǐng	Back Vertex	hu jeong 후정	go chō?	Hậu đính	
GV-20	百會	Baihui	bǎi huì	One Hundred Meetings	baek hoe 백회	hyaku e	Bách hội	
GV-21	前頂	Qianding	qián dǐng	Front Vertex	jeon jeong 전정	zen chō?	Tiền đính	
GV-22	囟會	Xinhui	xìn huì	Fontanelle Meeting	sin hoe 신회	shin e(?)	Tín hội	
GV-23	上星	Shangxing	shàng xīng	Upper Star	sang seong 상성	jō sei?	Thượng tinh	
GV-24	神庭	Shenting	shén tíng	Spirit Courtyard	sin jeong 신정	shin tei	Thần đình	
GV-25	素髎	Suliao	sù liáo	Plain Space	so ryo 소료	so ryō?	Tố liêu	
GV-26	人中	Renzhong	rén zhōng	Middle of the Person	in jung 인중/su gu 수구	jin chu	Nhân trung (Thủy câu)	水溝 shuǐ gōu [Water Pit]
GV-27	兌端	Duiduan	duì duān	End Exchange	tae don 태단	da tan(?)	Đoài đoan	
GV-28	齦交	Yinjiao	yín jiāo	Gum Union	eun gyo 은교	gin kō	Ngân giao	

== Conception vessel ==
Also known as Ren, Directing Vessel, abbreviated as CV and named 任脉穴; 任脈 "The Conception Vessel".

Point	Name	Transliteration	Pinyin	English	Korean 한글	Romaji	Vietnamese	Alternative names
CV-1	會陰	Huiyin	huì yīn	Yin Meeting	hoe eum 회음	e in	Hội âm	
CV-2	曲骨	Qugu	qū gǔ	Crooked Bone	gok gol 곡골	kyok kotsu?	Khúc cốt	
CV-3	中極	Zhongji	zhōng jí	Middle Extremity	jung geuk 중극	chū kyoku?	Trung cực	
CV-4	關元	Guanyuan	guān yuán	Origin Pass	gwan won 관원	kan gen	Quan nguyên	
CV-5	石門	Shimen	shí mén	Stone Gate	seong mun 석문	seki mon(?)	Thạch môn	
CV-6	氣海	Qihai	qì hǎi	Sea of Qi	gi hae 기해	ki kai	Khí hải	
CV-7	陰交	Yinjiao	yīn jiāo	Yin Intersection	eum gyo 음교	in kō	Âm giao	
CV-8	神闕	Shenque	shén què	Spirit Palace	sin gwol 신궐	shin ketsu(?)	Thần khuyết	
CV-9	水分	Shuifen	shuǐ fēn	Water Division	su bun 수분	sui bun(?)	Thủy phân	
CV-10	下脘	Xiawan	xià wǎn [or xià guǎn]	Lower Epigastrium	ha wan 하완	ge kan	Hạ quản	
CV-11	建里	Jianli	jiàn lǐ	Internal Foundation	geol li 건리	ken ri(?)	Kiến lý	健裡 jiàn lǐ
CV-12	中脘	Zhongwan	zhōng wǎn [or zhōng guǎn]	Middle Epigastrium	jung wan 중완	chū kan	Trung quản	
CV-13	上脘	Shangwan	shàng wǎn [or shàng guǎn]	Upper Epigastrium	sang wan 상완	jo kan	Thượng quản	
CV-14	巨闕	Juque	jù què	Great Palace	geo gwol 거궐	ko ketsu(?)	Cự khuyết	
CV-15	鳩尾	Jiuwei	jiū wěi	Bird Tail	gu mi 구미	kyū bi?	Cưu vĩ	
CV-16	中庭	Zhongting	zhōng tíng	Central Courtyard	jung jeong 중정	chū tei?	Trung đình	
CV-17	膻中	Shanzhong	shān zhōng	Middle of the Chest	dan jung 단중	dan chū	Đản trung	
CV-18	玉堂	Yutang	yù táng	Jade Hall	ok dang 옥당	gyoku dō?	Ngọc đường	
CV-19	紫宮	Zigong	zǐ gōng	Violet Palace	ja gung 자궁	shi kyū?	Tử cung	
CV-20	華蓋	Huagai	huá gài	Splendid Cover	hwa gae 화개	ko gai?	Hoa cái	ka gai
CV-21	璇璣	Xuanji	xuán jī	Jade Rotator	seon gi 선기	sen ki	Toàn cơ	
CV-22	天突	Tiantu	tiān tū	Heaven Projection	cheon dol 천돌	ten totsu	Thiên đột	
CV-23	廉泉	Lianquan	lián quán	Lateral Spring	yeom cheon 염천	ren sen	Liêm tuyền	
CV-24	承漿	Chengjiang	chéng jiāng	Saliva Container	seung jang 승장	shō shō	Thừa tương	
