= Zusanli =

Acupuncture point below the knee

Zusanli (Chinese: 足三里, ST36) is an acupoint, a point of the skin that is stimulated, with various techniques, in the practice of acupuncture. It is located below the knee, on the tibialis anterior muscle, along the stomach meridian.

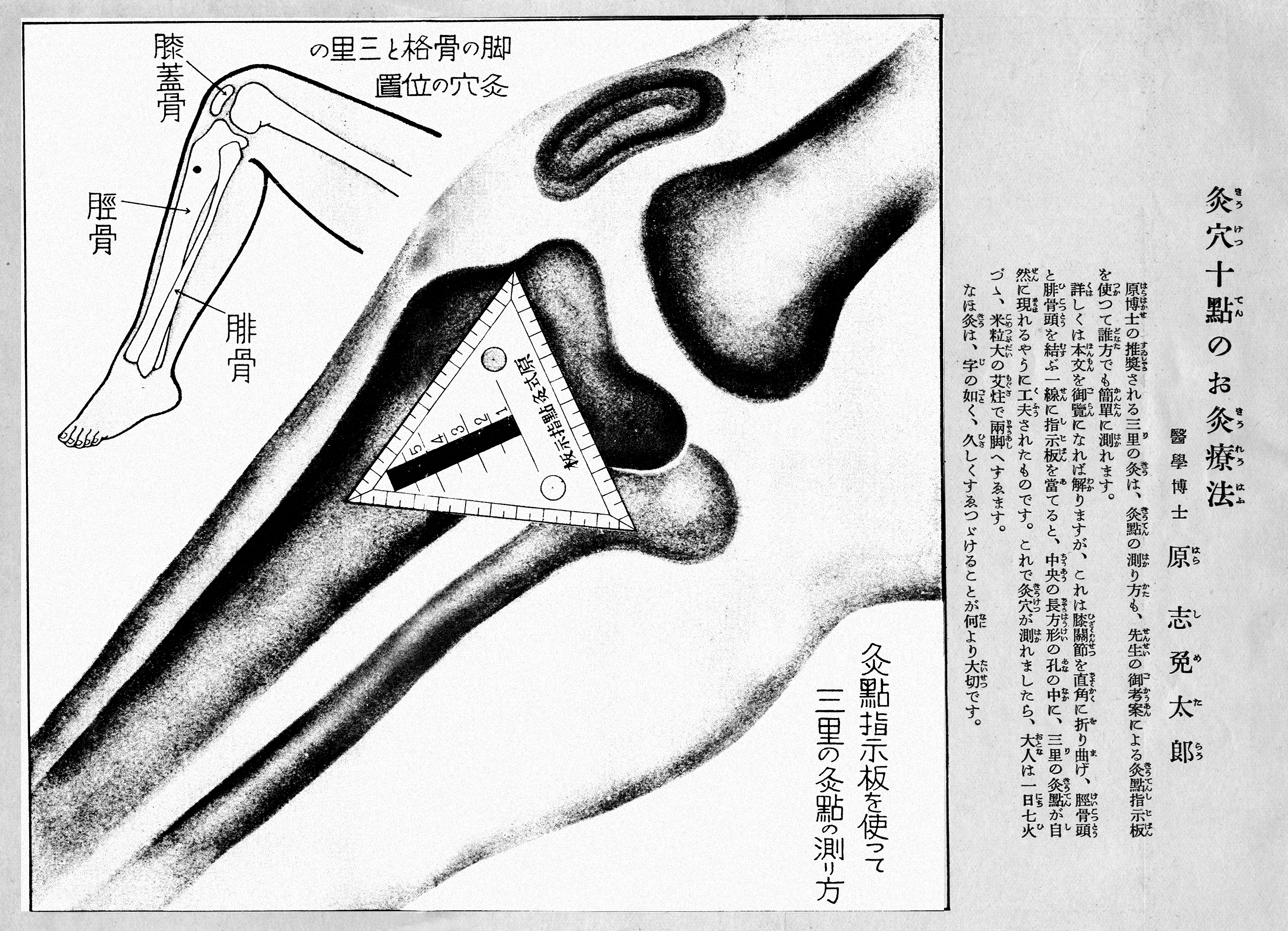
A Japanese diagram explaining how to find the zusanli acupoint, which is located 4 fingers below the tibialis anterior muscle

== Therapeutic uses and scientific validation ==
Acupuncture of Zusanli induces local serotonin release. Furthermore, the stimulation of this acupoint is shown to decrease inflammation, as evidenced by decreased cytokines (including interleukin 6) and inhibition of edema in a rat model of inflammation involving carrageenan injection. Zusanli activation also improves insulin sensitivity and cerebral blood flow (an effect mediated by nitric oxide), while it decreases sympathetic nerve activity and arterial pressure. An analgesic effect, mediated in part by nitric oxide as well, through the upregulation of inducible nitric oxide synthase (iNOS), an increase in endogenous opiates, muscarinic cholinergic receptors and serotonin receptors 5-HT1a and 5-HT3, was repeatedly evidenced.

The stimulation of Zusanli decreases the locomotor activity elicited by nicotine administration and decreases Fos-like immunoreactivity in the basal ganglia (e.g., the striatum, particularly the nucleus accumbens) in a rat model of nicotine sensitisation. Those changes in the basal ganglia also improve the alcohol withdrawal syndrome in similar experimental conditions.

== See also ==
- List of acupuncture points
