= Nei guan =

Pressure point on the body within traditional Chinese medicine

Nei guan (P6, Chinese: 内关) is an acupoint, a point of the skin that is stimulated with various techniques in the practice of acupuncture. It is located on the anterior forearm, two cun above to the wrist crease, between the tendons of palmaris longus and flexor carpi radialis muscles, along the pericardium meridian.

== Therapeutic uses and scientific validation ==
The Cochrane Collaboration, a group of evidence-based medicine (EBM) reviewers, reviewed the use of Nei guan (Acupoint P6) for nausea and vomiting, and found it to be effective for reducing post-operative nausea but not vomiting. When combined with an antiemetic Nei guan has been found to be effective in reducing both nausea and vomiting. However, the review acknowledged concerns about study limitations, unexplained variation in effects between studies, and an insufficient number of studies. The Cochrane review included various means of stimulating P6, including acupuncture, electro-acupuncture, transcutaneous nerve stimulation, laser stimulation, acustimulation device and acupressure; it did not comment on whether one or more forms of stimulation were more effective. EBM reviewer Bandolier said that'. One author of an article published in the Scientific Review of Alternative Medicine disagreed. Other studies show benefit in controlling the symptoms of GERD (gastroesophageal reflux disease), or of nausea and vomiting episodes during the first trimester of pregnancy.
