= Hégǔ L.I. 4 =

Concept in traditional Chinese medicine

HéGŭ L.I. 4 or simply Hegu (Chinese: 合谷; Wade–Giles: Hoku; lit. 'Enclosed valley', Korean: hap gok 합곡, Japanese: gō koku, Vietnamese: hợp cốc) is the fourth acupuncture point on the large intestine meridian (Hand Yang Ming) in traditional Chinese medicine.

This point is most noteworthy for its usefulness in stopping pain and for its capacity to cause the large intestine to contract, which can assist in moving bowels.

Actions
Expels exterior Wind and releases the Exterior.
Promotes diffusion of Lung Qu.
Regulates Wei qi and sweating.
Stops Pain.
Clears obstructions from LI channel.
