= Yangsheng (Daoism) =

Daoist self-cultivation practices

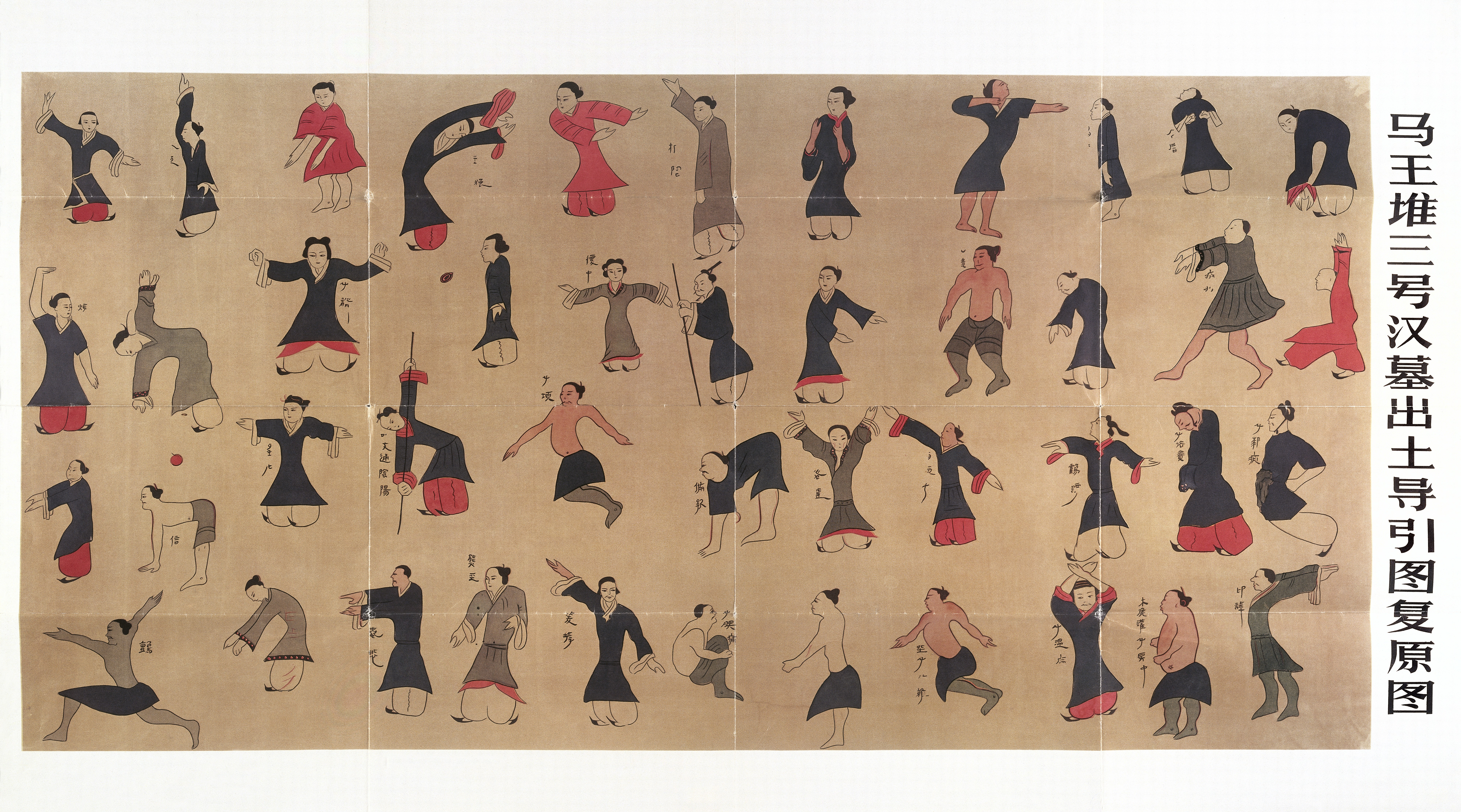
- Reconstructed drawings from the 168 BCE Daoyin tu (Chart for Guiding and Pulling [Qi Circulation]) in the Mawangdui Silk Texts

Chinese name
- Traditional Chinese: 養生
- Simplified Chinese: 养生
- Literal meaning: nurturing life
Transcriptions
Standard Mandarin
- Hanyu Pinyin: Yǎngshēng
- Wade–Giles: Yang-sheng
Yue: Cantonese
- Jyutping: Joeng^{5}sang^{1}
Middle Chinese
- Middle Chinese: YangXsræng
Old Chinese
- Baxter–Sagart (2014): *[G]aŋʔsreŋ

Korean name
- Hangul: 양생
- Hanja: 養生
Transcriptions
- McCune–Reischauer: Yangsaeng

Japanese name
- Kanji: 養生
- Hiragana: ようじょう
Transcriptions
- Revised Hepburn: Yōjō

In religious Daoism and traditional Chinese medicine, yangsheng refers to a range of self-cultivation practices designed to promote health and longevity. These techniques include calisthenics, self-massage, breathing exercises, meditation, internal and external Daoist alchemy, sexual practices, and dietary regimens.

Most yangsheng practices are intended to promote health and longevity, while a few are aimed at achieving "immortality" in the Daoist sense—referring to transformation into a xian ("transcendent"), a being who typically lives for several centuries before dying. While common longevity practices, such as maintaining a healthy diet and exercising, contribute to an extended lifespan and overall well-being, some esoteric methods of transcendence can be extreme or even hazardous. These include "grain avoidance" diets, in which practitioners consume only qi (breath) instead of solid food, and the ingestion of Daoist alchemical elixirs of life, which were often poisonous and could be fatally toxic.

== Terminology ==
The term yangsheng is a linguistic compound consisting of two common Chinese words. Yǎng (養) carries multiple meanings, including:

1. To nurture, rear, raise, foster, nourish, or tend; to care for and look after.
2. To support by providing basic necessities; to maintain, preserve, or keep in good condition.
3. To train, educate, or cultivate in the proper way of fulfilling one's responsibilities.
4. To nurse or treat in a manner that aids recuperation.

In addition to its common third-tone pronunciation (yǎng), the character 養 has a less frequent fourth-tone reading (yàng), meaning "to support and take care of," particularly in reference to one's parents. This usage appears in the Mengzi (late 4th century BCE), which states:

"Keeping one's parents when they are alive [養生者] is not worth being described as of major importance; it is treating them decently when they die that is worth such a description."

The standard and seal script forms of 養 incorporate the phonetic component yáng (羊; "sheep"), originally depicted as a ram’s head, and the radical shí (食; "food, feed"), indicating "to feed animals." In contrast, the ancient oracle bone and bronze script forms (e.g., 䍩) combine yáng (羊; "sheep") with pū (攵; "hit lightly; tap"), suggesting the meaning "to shepherd" or "to tend sheep."

Shang dynasty Oracle bone script for sheng (生; "grow; live")

The character shēng (生) has multiple meanings, including:

1. To live, be alive, or exist; life itself; a living being; the act of living; a lifetime or lifespan.
2. To cause life, bring into existence; to give birth, bear, originate; to come forth, appear; to grow or develop.
3. Fresh, green, or unripe; raw or uncooked; unfamiliar or unacquainted; unskillful, clumsy, inept, or awkward; unrefined.
4. Nature, natural instinct, inherent character, or intrinsic quality.

Ancient forms of the character shēng (生) were pictographs depicting a plant emerging from the earth (土), symbolizing growth and vitality.

The Hanyu Da Cidian (Comprehensive Chinese Word Dictionary), a lexicographical work comparable to the Oxford English Dictionary, provides five definitions for yǎngshēng (養生):

1. 保养生命; 维持生命 – To take good care of one’s health and preserve one’s lifespan.
2. 摄养身心使长寿 – To nourish the body and mind for longevity.
3. 畜养生物 – To raise animals.
4. 谓驻扎在物产丰富, 便于生活之处 – To be stationed in a location with abundant natural resources and a favorable living environment.
5. 生育 – To give birth or raise offspring.

The specialized fourth definition is illustrated by Zhang Yu’s (張預) commentary on The Art of War, which states:

"An army ordinarily prefers heights over low-lying areas, values brightness over darkness, nourishes itself with vitality, and positions itself on solid ground. In this way, it avoids numerous ailments and may be considered ‘invincible’."

Additionally, the Hanyu Da Cidian provides a definition for yàngshēng (養生) in its alternate pronunciation, as seen in Mencius:

1. 指奉养父母 – To support and take care of one’s parents.

The concept of yǎng (養; "nourishing") holds a central place in Chinese thought. It forms a broad semantic field that includes various related terms:

- yǎngshēng (養生) – "Nourish life"
- yǎngxíng (養形) – "Nourish the body"
- yǎngshēn (養身) – "Nourish the whole person"
- yǎngxìng (養性) – "Nourish the inner nature"
- yǎngzhì (養志) – "Nourish the will"
- yǎngxīn (養心) – "Nourish the mind"

=== Translations ===
"Nourishing life" is the most common English translation of yǎngshēng (養生). Other translations include:

- "Keep in good health; nourish one's vital principle."
- "Nurturing vitality."
- "Nourishing the vitality."
- "Longevity techniques."
- "Nurturing life."
- "Cultivating life."

Some sinologists translate yǎngshēng (養生) and yǎngxìng (養性) as "macrobiotic", using the English term in its original sense of "inclined or tending to prolong life; relating to the prolongation of life," rather than its more familiar macrobiotic diet meaning related to the Zen Buddhist dietary system intended to prolong life, which includes pure vegetable foods, brown rice, and similar foods (Oxford English Dictionary, 2009). The first example of this translation appears in Alfred Forke's 1907 rendering of Wang Chong's Lunheng (circa 80 CE), as discussed below. In his autobiography, Wang Chong mentions that, near the end of his life, "he wrote a book on Macrobiotics [養性] in sixteen chapters. To keep himself alive, he cherished the vital fluid [養氣]." Joseph Needham and Lu Gwei-djen further elaborate on this concept.

Macrobiotics is a convenient term for the belief that it is possible to prepare, with the aid of botanical, zoological, mineralogical and above all chemical, knowledge, drugs or elixirs [dan (丹)] which will prolong human life beyond old age [壽老; shoulao], rejuvenating the body and its spiritual parts so that the adept [真人; zhenren] can endure through centuries of longevity [長生; changsheng], finally attaining the status of eternal life and arising with etherealised body a true Immortal [升仙; sshengxian].

Donald Harper translates yǎngshēng (養生) and chángshēng (長生; 'long life') in the Mawangdui Silk Texts as "macrobiotic hygiene". In these medical manuscripts, chángshēng refers to "a somatic form of hygiene centered primarily on controlled breathing in conjunction with yogic exercises," a practice comparable to the classical Greek gymnosophists.

== Historical developments ==
Information about yǎngshēng ("nourishing life") health cultivation was traditionally confined to received texts, including the Chinese classics, until the discovery of second-century BCE medical manuscripts in the 1970s, which expanded this corpus.

=== Han manuscripts ===
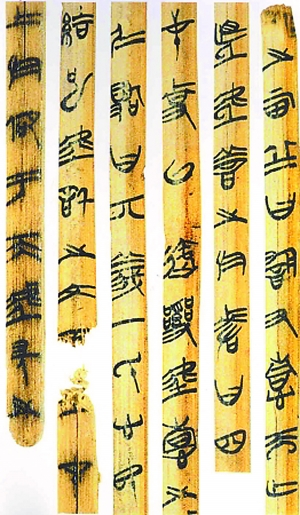
Manuscript written on bamboo strips, from the Kongzi Shilun (孔子詩論), an early discussion of the Classic of Poetry, Warring States period (c. 475-221 BCE)

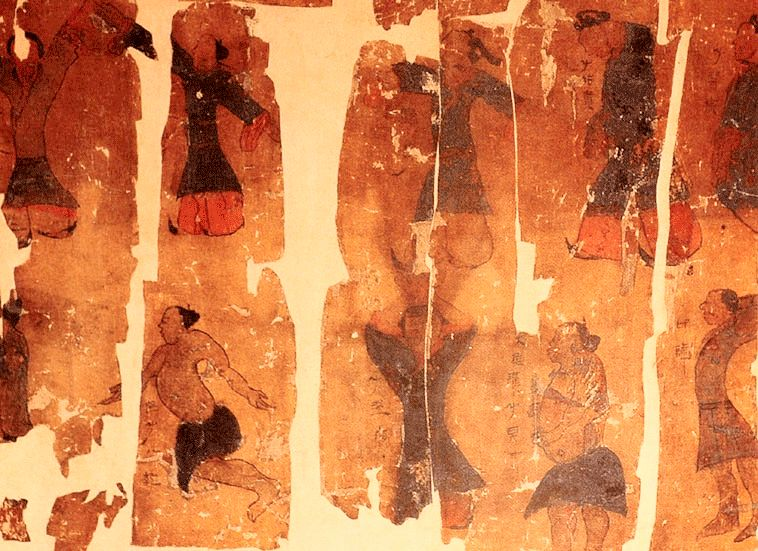
Original silk fragments of the 168 BCE Daoyin tu (Chart for Guiding and Pulling [Qi Circulation]) in the Mawangdui Silk Texts

During the Western Han dynasty (202 BCE – 9 CE), Chinese archaeologists excavated manuscript copies of ancient texts, some previously unknown, from tombs. Among these were several historically significant medical books, which later became known as the "medical manuals." Scribes occasionally copied texts onto valuable silk, but more commonly used bamboo and wooden slips, the standard medium for writing documents in China before the widespread introduction of paper during the Eastern Han period (25 BCE–220 CE).

In 1973, fifteen medical manuscripts, part of the Mawangdui Silk Texts, were excavated at the Mawangdui archaeological site in modern Changsha, Hunan. Additionally, two medical manuscripts from the Zhangjiashan Han bamboo texts were discovered in 1983 at Mount Zhangjia (張家山) in Jiangling County, Hubei. Both sites were located in the Han-era Changsha Kingdom (202 BCE–33 CE).

The Mawangdui manuscripts were found in a tomb dated to 168 BCE, while Harper places their redaction in the third century BCE. Six of the fifteen texts can be directly related to the yǎngshēng medical tradition of nourishing life. Two of these, He yīnyáng (合陰陽; "Conjoining Harmony of Yin and Yang") and Tianxia zhidao tán (天下至道谈; "Discussion of the Perfect Way in All Under Heaven"), primarily focus on techniques of sexual cultivation and essence preservation.

Two other texts, Yangshengfang (養生方; "Recipes for Nourishing Life") and Shiwen (十問; "Ten Questions"), similarly contain sections on sexology, but also discuss breathing techniques, food therapies, and medicines. The Quegu shiqi (卻穀食氣; "The Rejection of Grains and Absorption of Qi") focuses mainly on techniques for eliminating grains and ordinary foodstuffs from the diet, replacing them with medicinal herbs and qi, through special fuqi (服氣; "breath ingestion") exercises. The text repeatedly contrasts "those who eat qi" with "those who eat grain," explaining this in cosmological terms: "Those who eat grain eat what is square; those who eat qi eat what is round. Round is heaven; square is earth."

The Daoyin tu (導引圖; "Gymnastics Chart") includes color illustrations of human figures performing therapeutic gymnastics. Some captions refer to the names of exercises, such as xiongjing (熊經; 'bear hangs') and niaoshen (鳥伸; 'bird stretches'), which are also mentioned in the Zhuangzi and other texts.

The Zhangjiashan cache of manuscripts, written on bamboo slips, was excavated from a tomb dated to 186 BCE and contained two significant medical books. The Maishu comprises several texts listing ailments and describing the eleven meridians before the addition of the pericardium channel. The collection is closely related to the Mawangdui meridian texts and both briefly describe yǎngshēng practices of nourishing life.

The Yīnshū (引書; "Book on Pulling") outlines a daily and seasonal health regimen, including hygiene, dietetics, sleep, and recovery. It then details fifty-seven preventative and curative gymnastic exercises, along with massage techniques, and concludes with the etiology and prevention of diseases. The text recommends various therapies, such as breathing exercises, bodily stretches, and careful treatment of the interior qi. It states: "If you can pattern your qi properly and maintain your yin energy in fullness, then the whole person will benefit."

The Yīnshū manuscript considers longevity techniques to be limited to the aristocracy and upper classes, distinguishing between "upper class people," who fall ill due to uncontrolled emotions like extreme joy or rage, and less-fortunate individuals, whose diseases tend to be caused by excessive labor, hunger, thirst, and poor or evil qi (air). The latter group, lacking the opportunity to learn essential breathing exercises, consequently becomes sick and dies at an early age.

The Yīnshū manuscript is considered the "earliest known systematized description of therapeutic exercise in China, and possibly anywhere in the world."

=== Han texts ===
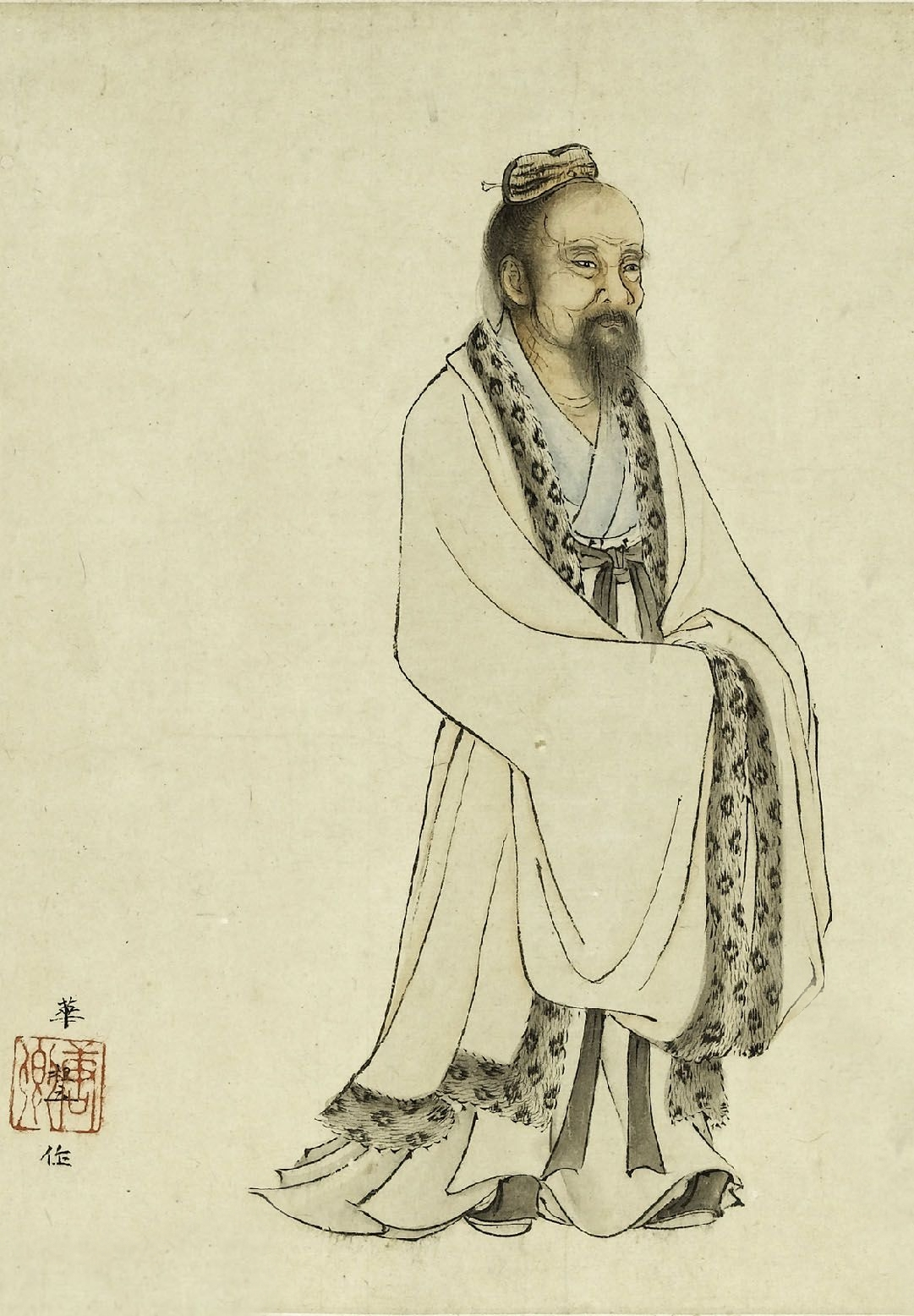
Zhuang Zhou, Yuan dynasty painting, 14th century

Classics from the Han dynasty (202 BCE–220 CE) first mention yǎngshēng techniques. The Daoist Zhuangzi includes early descriptions of yǎngshēng, notably in Chapter 3, titled Yangsheng zhu (養生主; "Essentials for Nurturing Life"), which is part of the pre-Han "Inner Chapters" attributed to Zhuang Zhou (c. 369–286 BCE). In the fable about Lord Wenhui (文惠君) coming to understand the Dao while watching Cook Ding (庖丁) cut up an ox, he exclaims how wonderful it is "that skill can attain such heights!"

The cook replies, "What your servant loves is the Way, which goes beyond mere skill. When I first began to cut oxen, what I saw was nothing but whole oxen. After three years, I no longer saw whole oxen. Today, I meet the ox with my spirit rather than looking at it with my eyes. My sense organs stop functioning and my spirit moves as it pleases. In accord with the natural grain [依乎天理], I slice at the great crevices, lead the blade through the great cavities. Following its inherent structure, I never encounter the slightest obstacle even where the veins and arteries come together or where the ligaments and tendons join, much less from obvious big bones." ... " "Wonderful!" said Lord Wenhui. "From hearing the words of the cook, I have learned how to nourish life [養生]."

Two other chapters of the Zhuangzi mention yǎngshēng. In one instance, Duke Wei (威公), the younger brother of King Kao of Zhou (r. 440–426 BCE), asks Tian Kaizhi (田開之) what he had learned from his master Zhu Shen (祝腎; "Worthy Invoker"). Tian replies, "I have heard my master say, 'He who is good at nurturing life [善養生者] is like a shepherd [牧羊]. If he sees one of his sheep lagging behind, he whips it forward.'"

To explain this, Tian contrasts two figures: a frugal Daoist hermit named Solitary Leopard (單豹), who lived in the cliffs, drank only water, and remained healthy until the age of seventy when a tiger killed him, with a wealthy businessman named Chang Yi (張毅), who rushed about in search of profits but died of typhoid fever at the age of forty. Tian explains: "Leopard nourished his inner being and the tiger ate his outer person. Yi nourished his outer person and sickness attacked his inner being. Both of them failed to whip their laggards forward."

This shepherding metaphor recalls the ancient characters for yǎng (養; 'nourish'), such as 䍩, which combine yáng (羊; 'sheep') and pū (攵; 'hit lightly', 'tap'), denoting "shepherd; tend sheep," as discussed above.

The latter story concerns the Lord of Lu (魯君), who heard that the Daoist Yan He (顏闔) had attained the Way and dispatched a messenger with presents for him. Yan "was waiting by a rustic village gate, wearing hempen clothing and feeding a cow by himself." When the messenger attempted to deliver the gifts, Yan said, "I'm afraid that you heard incorrectly and that the one who sent you with the presents will blame you. You had better check."

The messenger returned to the ruler, who instructed him to go back with the presents, but he could never find Yan He again, as Yan disliked wealth and honor. He then reflected: "Judging from this, the achievements of emperors and kings are the leftover affairs of the sages, not that which fulfills the person or nourishes life [完身養生]. Most of the worldly gentlemen of today endanger their persons and abandon life in their greed for things. Is this not sad?"

Three chapters of the Zhuangzi mention yǎngxíng (養形; "nourishing the body"). One of these contains the earliest Chinese reference to methods of controlling and regulating the breath. It describes dàoyǐn (導引; "guiding and pulling") calisthenics, which typically involve bending, stretching, and mimicking animal movements.

Blowing and breathing, exhaling and inhaling, expelling the old and taking in the new, bear strides and bird stretches—all this is merely indicative of the desire for longevity. But it is favored by scholars who channel the vital breath and flex the muscles and joints, men who nourish the physical form [養形] so as to emulate the hoary age of Progenitor P'eng.

Although the Zhuangzi considers physical calisthenics inferior to more meditative techniques, it provides a highly detailed description of them.

Another chapter of the Zhuangzi describes the limitations of yǎngxíng: "How sad that the people of the world think that nourishing the physical form [養形] is sufficient to preserve life! But when it turns out that nourishing the physical form [養形] is insufficient for the preservation of life, what in the world can be done that is sufficient?"

The Huainanzi, compiled in 139 BCE and attributed to Liu An, is an eclectic work drawing from various Hundred Schools of Thought, particularly Huang–Lao religious Daoism. Chapter 7 of the Huainanzi echoes Zhuangzi 15 in disparaging yǎngshēng techniques, arguing that they rely too heavily on external supports.

If you huff and puff, exhale and inhale, blow out the old and pull in the new, practice the Bear Hang, the Bird Stretch, the Duck Splash, the Ape Leap, the Owl Gaze, and the Tiger Stare: This is what is practiced by those who nurture the body [養形]. They are not the practices of those who polish the mind [e.g., the Perfected, 至人]. They make their spirit overflow, without losing its fullness. When, day and night, without injury, they bring the spring to external things [物], they unite with, and give birth to, the seasons in their own minds.

This criticism provides "a fascinating glimpse into the similarities," perceived even in the second century BCE, "between the qi cultivation practiced for physical benefits and the qi cultivation practiced for more transformative and deeply satisfying spiritual benefits, which seems to have involved more still sitting than active movement."

The Huainanzi uses the term yǎngxìng (養性; 'nourishing one's inner nature') to refer to mind-body techniques such as dietary regimens, breathing meditation, and macrobiotic yoga. "Since nature is the controlling mechanism of both consciousness and vitality, 'nourishing one's nature' produces both elevated states of consciousness and beneficial conditions of bodily health and longevity." For instance,

Tranquility and calmness are that by which the nature is nourished [養性]. Harmony and vacuity are that by which Potency is nurtured [養德]. When what is external does not disturb what is internal, then our nature attains what is suitable to it. When the harmony of nature is not disturbed, then Potency will rest securely in its position. Nurturing life [養生] so as to order the age, embracing Potency so as to complete our years, this may be called being able to embody the Way.

Another passage in the Huainanzi compares five yǎng- ("nourish; nurture") techniques.

In governing the self, it is best to nurture the spirit [養神; yangshen]. The next best is to nurture the body [養形; yangxing]. In governing the state, it is best to nurture transformation [養化; yanghua]. The next best is to correct the laws. A clear spirit and a balanced will, the hundred joints all in good order, constitute the root of nurturing vitality [養性; yangxing]. To fatten the muscles and skin, to fill the bowel and belly, to satiate the lusts and desires, constitute the branches of nurturing vitality [養生; yangsheng].”

The Huangdi Neijing ("Inner Classic of the Yellow Emperor"), dating to approximately the first century BCE, discusses a variety of healing therapies, including medical acupuncture, moxibustion, and herbal medicine, as well as life-nourishing practices such as gymnastics, massage, and dietary regulation. The fundamental principle of longevity practices, which runs throughout the text "like a red thread," is the prevention of disease by preserving vital forces for as long as possible.

The Suwen (素問; "Basic Questions") section reflects the early immortality cult and states that ancient sages, who lived in harmony with the Dao, could easily reach a lifespan of one hundred years. However, it laments that "these good times are over now, and people today do not know how to cultivate their life."

The astronomer, naturalist, and skeptical philosopher Wang Chong (c. 80 CE) critiques many Daoist beliefs in his Lunheng ("Critical Essays"), particularly the concept of yǎngxìng (養性; "nourishing one's inner nature").

The Lunheng contains only one mention of yǎngshēng (養生). In the "All About Ghosts" (訂鬼; Dìng Guǐ) chapter, Wang Chong explains how heavenly qi (translated as "fluid") develops into both ghosts and living organisms:

When the fluid is harmonious in itself, it produces and develops things [養生] when it is not, it does injury. First, it takes a form in heaven, then it descends and becomes corporeal on earth. Hence, when ghosts appear, they are made of this stellar fluid.

Wang Chong's "Taoist Untruths" (道虛; Dàoxū) chapter critiques several yǎngshēng practices, particularly the use of so-called "immortality" drugs, bìgǔ (grain avoidance), and Daoist yogic breathing exercises.

Daoist waidan (external alchemy) practitioners frequently compounded elixirs of "immortality", some of which contained toxic ingredients such as mercury and arsenic, often leading to elixir poisoning or death. One passage in the Lunheng critiques this practice, repeating the phrase tūnyào yǎngxìng (吞藥養性; "gulp down drugs and nourish one's nature") in a botanical analogy illustrating the natural process of aging.

The human hair and beard, and the different colours of things, when young and old, afford another cue. When a plant comes out, it has a green colour, when it ripens, it looks yellow. As long as man is young, his hair is black, when he grows old, it turns white. Yellow is the sign of maturity, white of old age. After a plant has become yellow, it may be watered and tended ever so much, it does not become green again. When the hair has turned white, no eating of drugs nor any care bestowed upon one’s nature [吞藥養性] can make it black again. Black and green do not come back, how could age and decrepitude be laid aside? ... Heaven in developing things can keep them vigorous up till autumn, but not further on till next spring. By swallowing drugs and nourishing one's nature [吞藥養性] one may get rid of sickness, but one cannot prolong one's life, and become an immortal.

While Wang Chong acknowledged that some medicines could improve health, he rejected the notion that any could transform a person into a xiān (transcendent).

The Taoists sometimes use medicines [服食藥物] with a view to rendering their bodies more supple and their vital force stronger, hoping thus to prolong their years and to enter a new existence. This is a deception likewise. There are many examples that by the use of medicines the body grew more supple and the vital force stronger, but the world affords no instance of the prolongation of life and a new existence following. … The different physics cure all sorts of diseases. When they have been cured, the vital force is restored, and then the body becomes supple again. According to man’s original nature his body is supple of itself, and his vital force lasts long of its own accord. … Therefore, when by medicines the various diseases are dispelled, the body made supple, and the vital force prolonged, they merely return to their original state, but it is impossible to add to the number of years, let alone the transition into another existence.

The "Taoist Untruths" chapter discusses Daoist grain-free diets in terms of bìgǔ (辟穀; 'avoiding grains') and shíqì (食氣; 'eating/ingesting breath'). It notes that Wangzi Qiao (王子喬), a son of King Ling of Zhou (r. 571–545 BCE), practiced bìgǔ, as did Li Shaojun (fl. 133 BCE).

The idea prevails that those who abstain from eating grain [辟穀], are men well versed in the art of Tao. They say e.g., that [Wangzi Qiao] and the like, because they did not touch grain, and lived on different food than ordinary people, had not the same length of life as ordinary people, in so far as having passed a hundred years, they transcended into another state of being, and became immortals. That is another mistake. Eating and drinking are natural impulses, with which we are endowed at birth. Hence the upper part of the body has a mouth and teeth, the inferior part orifices. With the mouth and teeth one chews and eats, the orifices are for the discharge. Keeping in accord with one's nature, one follows the law of heaven, going against it, one violates one's natural propensities, and neglects one's natural spirit before heaven. How can one obtain long life in this way? … For a man not to eat is like not clothing the body. Clothes keep the skin warm, and food fills the stomach. With a warm epidermis and a well-filled belly the animal spirits are bright and exalted. If one is hungry, and has nothing to eat, or feels cold, and has nothing to warm one’s self, one may freeze or starve to death. How can frozen and starved people live longer than others? Moreover, during his life man draws his vital force from food, just as plants and trees do from earth. Pull out the roots of a plant or a tree, and separate them from the soil, and the plant will wither, and soon die. Shut a man's mouth, so that he cannot eat, and he will starve, but not be long-lived.

Another passage describes shíqì (食氣; 'eating/ingesting breath') (sometimes translated as "eats the fluid") as a method to avoid consuming grains.

The Taoists exalting each other's power assert that the "pure man" [真人] eats the fluid [食氣], that the fluid is his food. Wherefore the books say that the fluid-eaters live long, and do not die, that, although they do not feed on cereals, they become fat and strong by the fluid. This too is erroneous. What kind of fluid is understood by fluid? If fluid of the Yin and the Yang be meant, this fluid cannot satiate people. They may inhale this fluid, so that it fills their belly and bowels, yet they cannot feel satiated. If the fluid inherent in medicine be meant, man may use and eat a case full of dry drugs, or swallow some ten pills. But the effects of medicine are very strong. They cause great pain in the chest, but cannot feed a man. The meaning must certainly be that the fluid-eaters breathe, inhaling and exhaling, emitting the old air and taking in the new. Of old, P'êng Tsu used to practise this. Nevertheless he could not live indefinitely, but died of sickness.

In addition to shíqì ("eating qi/breath") mentioned above, the Lunheng also refers to Daoist breath yoga as dǎoqì (導氣; 'guide the qi/breath')

Many Taoists hold that by regulating one's breath one can nourish one's nature [導氣養性], pass into another state of being, and become immortal. Their idea is that, if the blood vessels in the body be not always in motion, expanding and contracting, an obstruction ensues. There being no free passage, constipation is the consequence, which causes sickness and death. This is likewise without any foundation. Man’s body is like that of plants and trees. … When plants and trees, while growing, are violently shaken, they are injured, and pine away. Why then should man by drawing his breath and moving his body gain a long life and not die? The blood arteries traverse the body, as streams and rivers flow through the land. While thus flowing, the latter lose their limpidity, and become turbid. When the blood is moved, it becomes agitated also, which causes uneasiness. Uneasiness is like the hardships man has to endure without remedy. How can that be conducive to a long life?

The Han Confucian moralist Xun Yue (148–209) in his Shenjian (申鋻; 'Extended Reflections') presents a viewpoint similar to Wang Chong's interpretation of cultivating the vital principle. He advocates for seeking moderation and harmony while avoiding excesses. Additionally, he emphasizes the importance of circulating the breath to prevent blockages and stagnation, much like the mythical Yu the Great, who succeeded in controlling the floodwaters.

=== Six Dynasties texts ===
During the Six Dynasties period (222–589), yǎngshēng practices continued to develop and diversify within Daoist traditions, Xuanxue ("Arcane Learning"), and medical circles.

The polymath Ji Kang (223–262), one of the Daoist Seven Sages of the Bamboo Grove, authored a text titled Yangsheng lun (養生論; "Essays on Nourishing Life"). The early Zhuangzi commentator Xiang Xiu (227–272) wrote a critique with the same title, to which Ji Kang responded with Danan Yangsheng lun (答難養生論; "Refutation of 'Essays on Nourishing Life"). Ji Kang believed that achieving immortality was possible but only for individuals possessing extraordinary qi. However, he argued that even those without exceptional qi could significantly extend their lifespan—potentially to several hundred years—by practicing longevity techniques.

The Daoist scholar Ge Hong's 318 CE Baopuzi ("Master Who Embraces Simplicity") describes various techniques for yangsheng (養生; 'nourishing life') and changsheng (長生; 'longevity'), which Ware translates as "nurturing of life" and "fullness of life." Methods of neixiu (內修; 'inner cultivation') include tuna (吐納; 'breathing techniques'), taixi (胎息; 'embryonic breathing'), daoyin (導引; 'gymnastics'), and xingqi (行氣; 'circulation of breath/energy'), all of which are early forms of what is now known as qigong (氣功). Methods of waiyang (外養; 'outer nourishment') include xianyao (仙藥; 'herbs of immortality'), bigu (辟穀; 'grain avoidance'), fangzhongshu (房中術; 'bedchamber arts'), jinzhou (禁咒; 'curses and incantations'), and fulu (符籙; 'talismanic registers').

Ge Hong cites the Huangdi Jiuding Shendan Jing (黃帝九鼎神丹經; 'The Yellow Emperor's Manual of the Nine-Vessel Magical Elixir').

The Yellow Emperor rose into the sky and became a genie after taking this elixir. It adds that by merely doing the breathing exercises and calisthenics and taking herbal medicines one may extend one's years but cannot prevent ultimate death. Taking the divine elixir, however, will produce an interminable longevity and make one coeval with sky and earth; it lets one travel up and down in Paradise, riding clouds or driving dragons.

The Baopuzi distinguishes between longevity and immortality, categorizing immortals into three types: celestial immortals (天仙; tiānxiān), earthly immortals (地仙; dìxiān), and corpse-liberated immortals (尸解仙; shījiě xiān). Engelhardt states, "The foundation of immortality in any form, then, is a healthy life. This means that one must avoid all excesses and prevent or heal all diseases." Taking a fundamentally pragmatic approach to yǎngshēng (nourishing life) and changsheng (longevity) practices, Ge Hong asserts that "the perfection of any one method can only be attained in conjunction with several others."

The taking of medicines [服藥] may be the first requirement for enjoying Fullness of Life [長生], but the concomitant practice of breath circulation [行氣] greatly enhances speedy attainment of the goal. Even if medicines [神藥] are not attainable and only breath circulation is practiced, a few hundred years will be attained provided the scheme is carried out fuIly, but one must also know the art of sexual intercourse [房中之術] to achieve such extra years. If ignorance of the sexual art causes frequent losses of sperm to occur, it will be difficult to have sufficient energy to circulate the breaths.

There are inherent risks for practitioners who focus exclusively on a single technique, as over-specialization may lead to imbalances or unintended consequences.

In everything pertaining to the nurturing of life [養生] one must learn much and make the essentials one's own; look widely and know how to select. There can be no reliance upon one particular specialty, for there is always the danger that breadwinners will emphasize their personal specialties. That is why those who know recipes for sexual intercourse [房中之術] say that only these recipes can lead to geniehood. Those who know breathing procedures [吐納] claim that only circulation of the breaths [行氣] can prolong our years. Those knowing methods for bending and stretching [屈伸] say that only calisthenics can exorcize old age. Those knowing herbal prescriptions [草木之方] say that only through the nibbling of medicines can one be free from exhaustion. Failures in the study of the divine process are due to such specializations.

Ge Hong provides guidance on how to prevent illness, emphasizing the importance of maintaining balance and practicing various life-nourishing techniques.

If you are going to do everything possible to nurture your life [養生], you will take the divine medicines [神藥]. In addition, you will never weary of circulating your breaths [行氣]; morning and night you will do calisthenics [導引] to circulate your blood and breaths and see that they do not stagnate. In addition to these things, you will practice sexual intercourse in the right fashion; you will eat and drink moderately; you will avoid drafts and dampness; you will not trouble about things that are not within your competence. Do all these things, and you will not fall sick.

The Baopuzi bibliography includes a now-lost text titled Yangshengshu (養生書; "Book for Nurturing Life"), which consisted of 105 juan (卷; 'scrolls', 'fascicles', 'volumes').

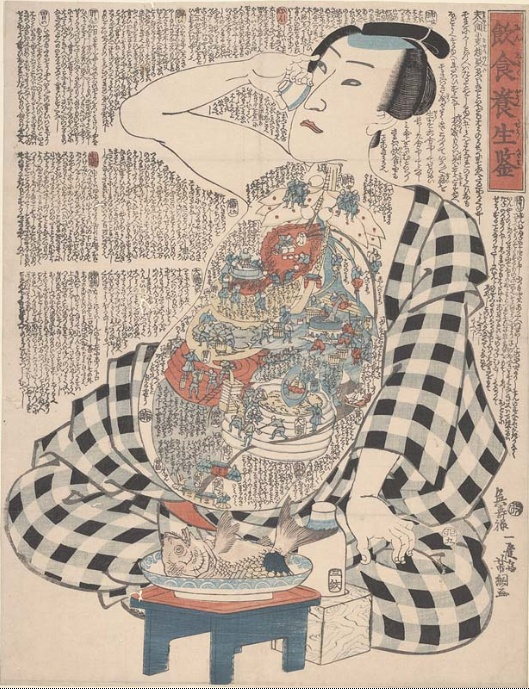
"Drinking, Eating, and Nourishing Life" (飲食養生鏡), 1855 ukiyo-e by Utagawa Yoshitsuna (歌川芳綱)

The Eastern Jin dynasty official and Liezi commentator Zhang Zhan (張湛, fl. 370) authored one of the most influential works on yangsheng during the Six Dynasties period, the Yangsheng yaoji (養生要集; "Essentials of Nourishing Life"). For those seeking health and immortality, this text was regarded as equally important as the Daodejing and Huangtingjing (黃庭經; "Yellow Court Classic"). It served as "a widely available source of information for the educated but not necessarily initiated reader" until it was lost during the eighth century.

The Yangsheng yaoji holds significance in the history of yǎngshēng techniques for three key reasons: it preserves citations from several earlier works that would have otherwise been lost, it established a standard textbook model that influenced later works, and it is the earliest known text to systematize and classify various longevity practices into an integrated system. Although the original text was lost, numerous fragments and citations survive, particularly in Tao Hongjing's Yangxing yanming lu (養性延命錄; "On Nourishing Inner Nature and Extending Life"), Sun Simiao's 652 千金方; Qianjin fang; "Prescriptions Worth a Thousand Gold [Pieces]", and early Japanese medical texts such as the 984 Ishinpō (醫心方, "Methods from the Heart of Medicine").

During the Northern and Southern dynasties (420–589), yǎngshēng practices incorporated Chinese Buddhist meditation techniques, particularly Ānāpānasati ("mindfulness of breathing"), as well as Indian gymnastic exercises. Daoist meditation methods such as zuowang (坐忘; 'sitting and forgetting') and qingjing (清靜; 'clarity and stillness') were influenced by these Buddhist practices.

=== Sui to Tang texts ===
In the Sui (561–618) and Tang (618–907) dynasties, Daoist and medical circles transmitted essential yǎngshēng techniques, particularly those related to gymnastics and breathing. The number of medical texts expanded significantly, increasing from 36 in the Catalog of the Imperial Library of the Han to 256 in the Catalog of the Imperial Library of the Sui.

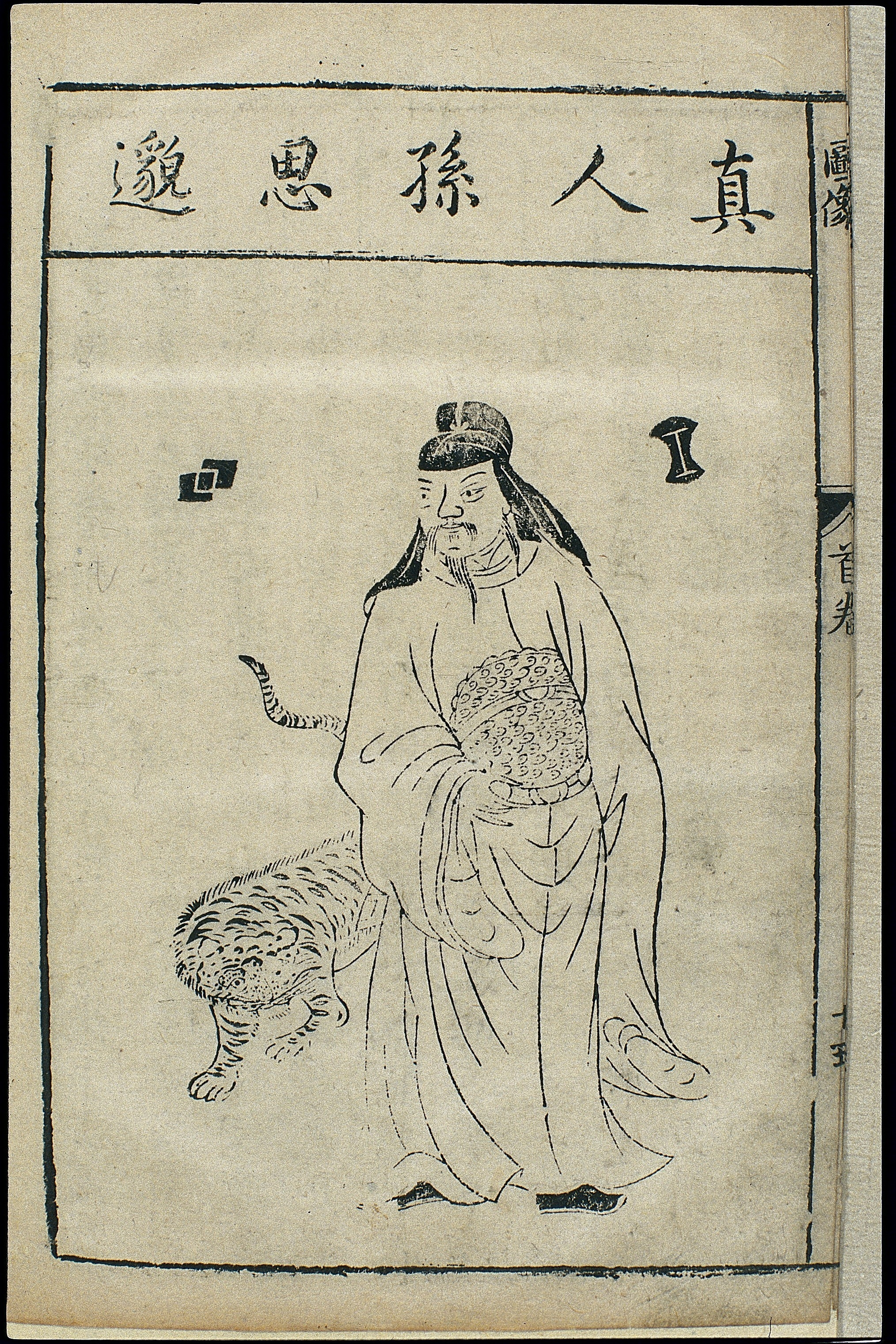
Sun Simiao as depicted by Gan Bozong, woodblock print, Tang dynasty (618–907)

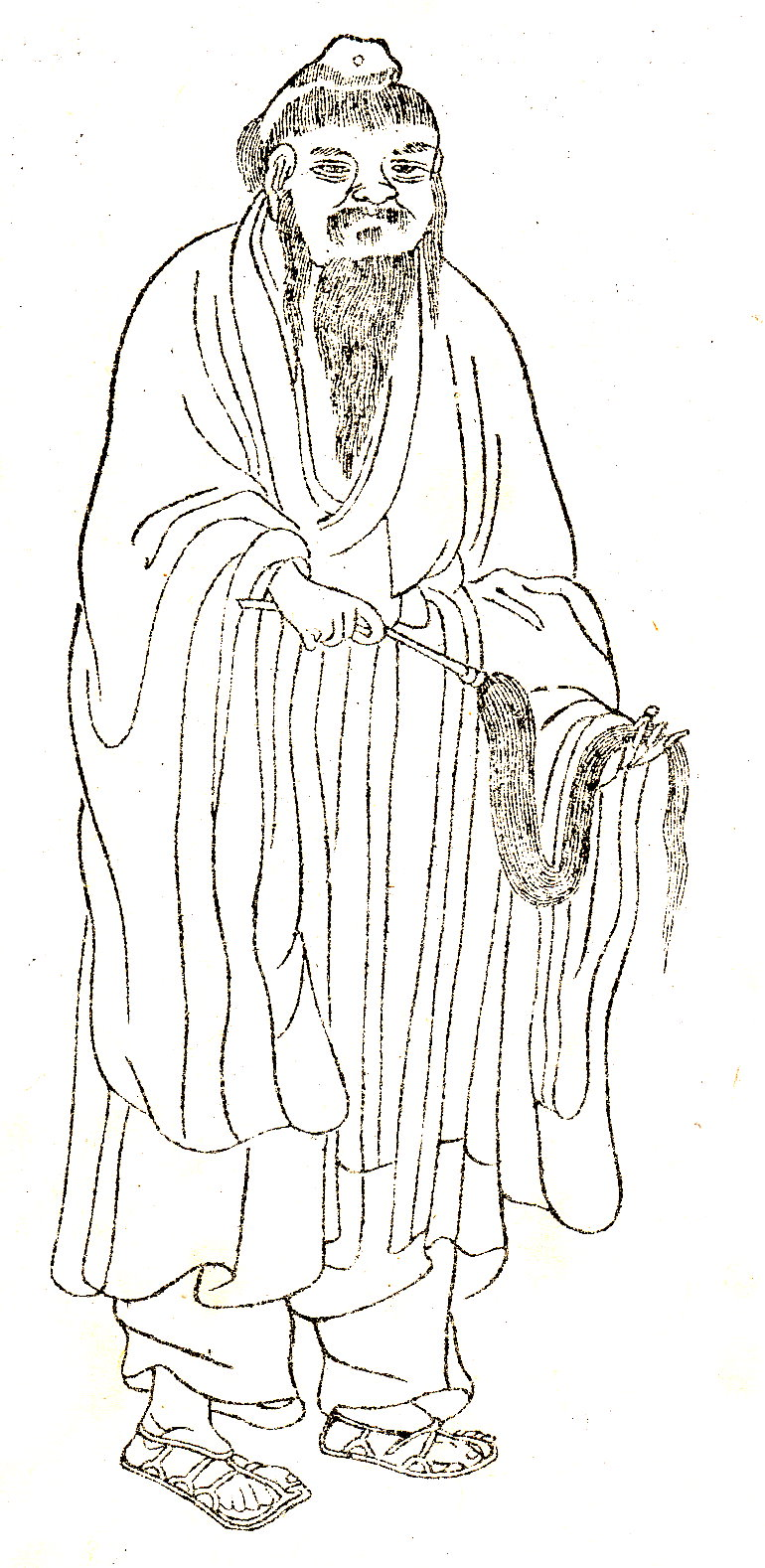
Sima Chengzhen, 1921 book illustration

The Zhubing yuanhou lun (諸病源候論; "Treatise on the Origin and Symptoms of Diseases"), compiled in 610 under imperial orders by an editorial committee supervised by the Sui physician and medical author Chao Yuanfang, is a work of "unprecedented scope" and represents the first systematic treatise on the etiology and pathology of Chinese medicine. The text categorizes 1,739 diseases based on their causes and clinical symptoms, with many entries citing an anonymous text titled Yangsheng fang (養生方; "Recipes for Nourishing Life"), which closely resembles the fourth-century Yangsheng yaoji. Unlike standard medical texts prescribing herbal or acupuncture treatments, the Zhubing yuanhou lun emphasizes yangxing (養性) techniques, including hygienic measures, dietary practices, gymnastics, massage, breathing exercises, and visualization methods.

The renowned physician Sun Simiao dedicated two chapters—Chapter 26, Dietetics, and Chapter 27, Longevity Techniques—of his 652 work, Qianjin fang to life-nourishing methods. The Qianjin fang is a vast compendium of Tang dynasty medical knowledge, regarded as the oldest surviving comprehensive source on Chinese therapeutics, and continues to be used in traditional medical training today.

Sun Simiao also authored the Sheyang zhenzhong fang (攝養枕中方; "Pillow Book of Methods for Nourishing Life"), which is divided into five sections: prudence, prohibitions, daoyin gymnastics, guiding the qi, and 'guarding the One' (守一; shouyi). The text identifies overindulgence in any form as a primary cause of illness.

Additionally, several shorter texts are attributed to Sun Simiao, including the Yangxing yanming lu (養性延命錄; "On Nourishing Inner Nature and Extending Life"), the Fushou lun (福壽論; "Essay on Happiness and Longevity"), and the 保生銘; Baosheng ming; "Inscription on Protecting Life".

The Daoist Shangqing School patriarch Sima Chengzhen (司馬承禎, 647–735) authored the Fuqi jingyi lun (服氣精義論; "Essay on the Essential Meaning of Breath Ingestion") in 730. This work presents an integrated framework of health practices, combining traditional Chinese physical techniques with the Buddhist-inspired practice of guan (觀; 'insight meditation') as preparatory steps for attaining and realizing the Dao.

Drawing upon both Shangqing religious texts and major medical sources such as the Huangdi Neijing, the Fuqi jingyi lun organizes various longevity techniques around the central concept of absorbing qi. In addition to providing practical instructions for specific exercises, the text incorporates theoretical medical knowledge, including discussions on the 'five orbs' (五臟; wu zang), disease healing, and symptom awareness.

=== Song to Qing texts ===
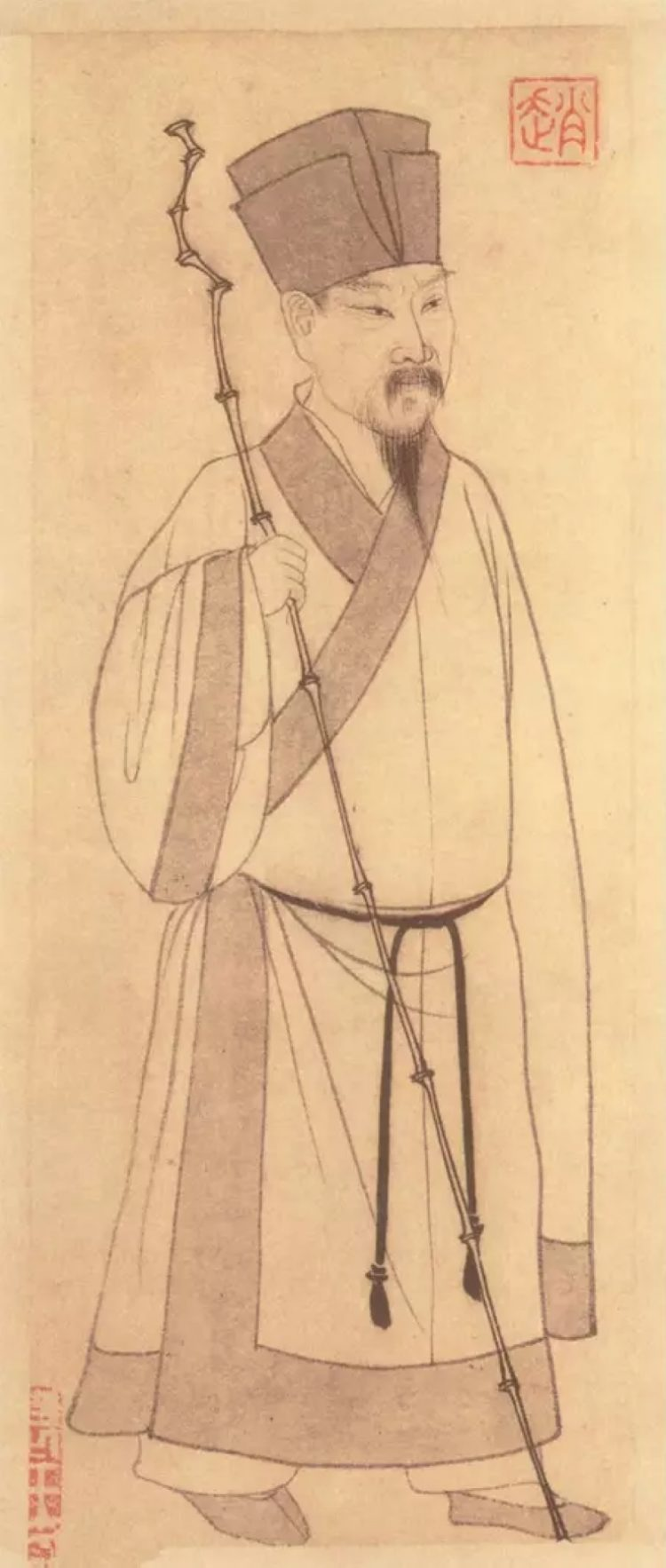
Su Shi, Yuan dynasty painting by Zhao Mengfu, 1301

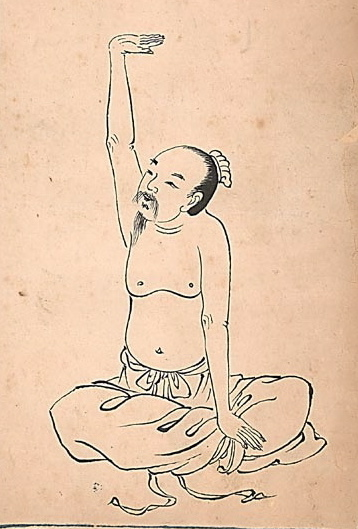
Illustration of the Baduanjin qigong "Separate Heaven and Earth" exercise, Qing dynasty 17th-18th century

yǎngshēng practices underwent significant transformations beginning in the Song dynasty (960–1279). They increasingly integrated elements from neidan ("inner alchemy") and attracted scholarly interest. During the Song period alone, approximately twenty books were written on the subject.

A notable author of the time was Zhou Shouzhong (周守中), who wrote the Yangsheng leizuan (養生類纂; "Classified Compendium on Nourishing Life") and the Yangsheng yuelan (養生月覽; "Monthly Readings on Nourishing Life"), among other works. Prominent Song literati and poets, such as Su Shi (1007–1072) and Su Dongpo (1037–1101), also wrote extensively on their personal longevity practices. Another significant work from this period was Chen Zhi’s (陳直) Yanglao Fengqin Shu (養老奉親書; "Book on Nourishing Old Age and Taking Care of One's Parents"), the first Chinese text dedicated exclusively to geriatrics.

With the rise of Neo-Confucianism and the increasing syncretism among Daoism, Buddhism, and Confucianism during the Ming (1368–1644) and Qing (1644–1912) dynasties, yǎngshēng practices incorporated a number of ethical elements.

During the Ming dynasty (1368–1644), numerous collections and compendia on longevity practices were published. Hu Wenhuan (胡文焕), editor of the 1639 edition of Jiuhuang Bencao ("Famine Relief Herbal"), compiled one of the most comprehensive works on yǎngshēng, the Shouyang congshu (壽養叢書; "Collectanea on Longevity and Nourishment [of Life]"), around 1596. This collection includes texts such as the Yangsheng shiji (養生食忌; "Prohibitions on Food for Nourishing Life") and the Yangsheng daoyin fa (養生導引法; "Daoyin Methods for Nourishing Life").

Some works from this period provide broad overviews of diverse longevity techniques. For example, the dramatist Gao Lian (fl. 1573–1581) authored Zunsheng bajian (遵生八笺; "Eight Essays on Being in Accord with Life"), which discusses yangsheng diets, breathing methods, and medicinal practices. Other texts focus on a single technique, such as Tiaoxi fa (調息法; 'Breath Regulation Methods') by the Neo-Confucian philosopher Wang Ji (1498–1582).

A significant development during the Ming dynasty was the increased integration and legitimization of yǎngshēng techniques within medical literature. For instance, Yang Jizhou's (楊繼洲) extensive 1601 work, Zhenjiu dacheng (針灸大成; "Great Compendium on Acupuncture and Moxibustion"), which remains a classic in traditional Chinese medicine, includes gymnastic exercises designed to regulate the qi meridians.

Unlike the Ming dynasty, the Qing dynasty (1644–1912) produced no significant works on yangsheng. In the twentieth century, yangsheng evolved in two distinct directions: it influenced the development of weisheng (衛生; 'hygiene', 'health', 'sanitation') as a modern, Westernized science, while also contributing to the emergence of qigong as a structured practice of breath and energy cultivation.

Dear's anthropological study of yangsheng's popularity and commercialization in early twenty-first-century China contrasts it with Qigong fever, a social phenomenon of the 1980s and 1990s, during which the practice of qigong gained extraordinary popularity, with an estimated peak of 60 to 200 million practitioners. While Qigong fever had a "somewhat austere and salvationist aspect," the more recent Yangsheng fever, which shares many similarities in its pursuit of health and identity, "has a certain low-key decadence about it." For instance, the term yangsheng is now used to market luxury suburban villas, high-end health spas, extravagantly packaged medicinal products such as chongcao (蟲草; "Ophiocordyceps sinensis"), and tourism to scenic natural landscapes, all of which serve as markers of the modern Yangsheng trend.

== Sources ==
- Barrett, T.H.; Kohn, Livia (2008). "Yangsheng yaoji". In Fabrizio Pregadio (ed.). The Encyclopedia of Taoism. Routledge. pp. 1151–1152.
- Collins, Roy; Kerr, David (August 2001). "Etymology of the Word "Macrobiotic:s"[sic] and Its Use in Modern Chinese Scholarship" (PDF). Sino-Platonic Papers (113).
- Dear, David (2012). "Chinese Yangsheng: Self-help and Self-image". Asian Medicine. 7: 1–33. doi:10.1163/15734218-12341242.
- DeFrancis, John, ed. (1996). ABC Chinese-English Dictionary. University of Hawaiʻi Press.
- Despeux, Catherine (2008). "Yangsheng 養生 Nourishing Life". In Fabrizio Pregadio (ed.). The Encyclopedia of Taoism. Routledge. pp. 1148–1150.
- Engelhardt, Ute (1989). "Qi for Life: Longevity in the Tang". In Kohn, Livia (ed.). Taoist Meditation and Longevity Techniques. University of Michigan. pp. 263–296.
- Engelhardt, Ute (2000). "Longevity Techniques and Chinese Medicine". In Kohn, Livia (ed.). Daoism Handbook. E. J. Brill. pp. 74–108.
- Forke, Alfred tr. (1907). Lun-hêng, Part 1, Philosophical Essays of Wang Ch'ung. Leipzig: Otto Harrassowitz.
- Harper, Donald (1998) [2009]. Early Chinese Medical Literature: The Mawangdui Medical Manuscripts. Kegan Paul.
- Kohn, Livia, ed. (1989). Taoist Meditation and Longevity Techniques. University of Michigan.
- Kroll, Paul K. (2017). A Student's Dictionary of Classical and Medieval Chinese (Revised ed.). Brill.
- Lau, D. C. tr. (1970). Mencius. Penguin Books. ISBN 978-0-14-044228-1.
- Mair, Victor H. tr. (1994). Wandering on the Way, Early Taoist Tales and Parables of Chuang Tzu. Bantam. ISBN 0-553-37406-0.
- Mair, Victor H. tr. (2007). The Art of War: Sun Zi's Military Method. Columbia University Press. ISBN 9780231133821.
- Major, John S.; Queen, Sarah; Meyer, Andrew; Roth, Harold D., eds. (2010). The Huainanzi: A Guide to the Theory and Practice of Government in Early Han China. Columbia University Press. ISBN 978-0-231-14204-5.
- Maspero, Henri (1981). Taoism and Chinese Religion. Translated by Frank A. Kierman. University of Massachusetts Press.
- Needham, Joseph; Lu, Gwei-djen (1974). Science and Civilisation in China, Volume 5, Chemistry and Chemical Technology, Part 2: Spagyrical Discovery and Inventions: Magisteries of Gold and Immortality. Cambridge University Press.
- Needham, Joseph; Lu, Gwei-djen (2000). Science and Civilisation in China, Volume 6, Biology and Biological Technology, Part 6: Medicine. Cambridge University Press.
- Theobald, Ulrich (2010). "Baopuzi 抱朴子". Chinaknowledge.
- Ware, James R. tr. (1966). Alchemy, Medicine and Religion in the China of A.D. 320: The Nei Pien of Ko Hung. Dover.
- Yang, Dolly (2022). "Therapeutic Exercise in the Medical Practice of Sui China (581-618 CE)". In Lo, Vivienne; Stanley-Baker, Michael; Yang, Dolly (eds.). Routledge Handbook of Chinese Medicine. Routledge. pp. 109–119. ISBN 9781135008963.
