= Bigu (grain avoidance) =

Daoist fasting technique

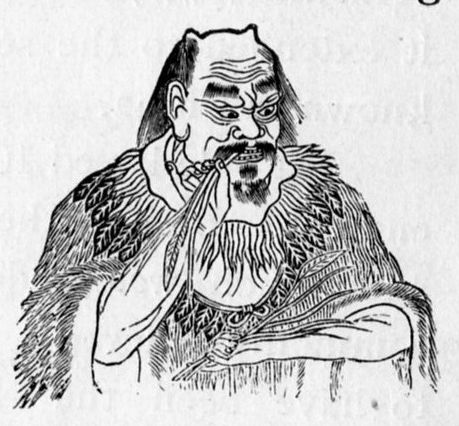
Shennong tasting plants to discover their qualities

Bigu (simplified Chinese: 辟谷; traditional Chinese: 辟穀; pinyin: bìgǔ; Wade–Giles: pi-ku; lit. 'avoiding grains') is a Daoist fasting technique associated with achieving xian "transcendence; immortality". Grain avoidance is related to multifaceted Chinese cultural beliefs. For instance, bigu fasting was the common medical cure for expelling the sanshi 三尸 "Three Corpses", the malevolent, grain-eating spirits that live in the human body (along with the hun and po souls), report their host's sins to heaven every 60 days, and carry out punishments of sickness and early death.

Avoiding "grains" has been diversely interpreted to mean not eating particular foodstuffs (food grain, cereal, the Five Grains, wugu, or staple food), or not eating any food (inedia). In the historical context of traditional Chinese culture within which the concept of bigu developed, there was great symbolic importance connected with the five grains and their importance in sustaining human life, exemplified in various myths and legends from ancient China and throughout subsequent history. The concept of bigu developed in reaction to this tradition, and within the context of Daoist philosophy.

== Terminology ==
The Chinese word bigu compounds bi 辟 "ruler; monarch; avoid; ward off; keep away" and gu 穀 or 谷 "cereal; grain; (穀子) millet". The bi 辟 meaning in bigu is a variant Chinese character for bi 避 "avoid; shun; evade; keep away" (e.g., bixie 辟邪 or 避邪 "ward off evil spirits; talisman; amulet"). The alternate pronunciation of pi 辟 "open up; develop; refute; eliminate" is a variant character for 闢. The complex 14-stroke traditional Chinese character gu 穀 "grain" has a 7-stroke simplified Chinese character gu 谷 "valley; gorge." Although a few Chinese dictionaries gloss the pronunciation of bigu 辟穀 as pigu, the definitive Hanyu Da Cidian (1997) gives bigu.

English lexicographic translations of bigu are compared in this table.

Chinese-English Dictionary	Definition of 辟穀 / 辟谷
Giles	"to give up eating the five cereals, with a view to immortality. Also, to refuse food, -- and starve"
Mathews	"to abstain from cereals in order to attain to immortality; to starve"
Liang & Chang	"to avoid eating cereals in order to obtain immortality"
Lin	"stop even vegetarian food, as a way of becoming Taoist immortal"
DeFrancis	"avoid eating cereals in order to gain immortality"
Kleeman & Yu	"refuse to eat grain"

Catherine Despeux lists synonyms for bigu "abstention from cereals": duangu Chinese: 斷穀; pinyin: Duàn gǔ "stopping cereals" (with duan 斷 "cut off; sever; break; give up"), juegu 絕穀 "discontinuing cereals" (jue 絕 "cut off; sever; refuse; reject"), quegu 卻穀 "refraining from cereals" (que 卻 "retreat; decline; reject; refuse"), and xiuliang Chinese: 修糧; pinyin: Xiū liáng "stopping grains" (with xiu 修 "repair; trim; prune' cultivate" and liang 糧 "grain; food").

Juegu, unlike these other alternative expressions, had meanings besides Daoist dietary practices. For instance, the (c. 139 BCE) Huainanzi uses juegu in a traditional saying: "Now, rejecting study because those who study have faults is like taking one instance of choking to refuse grain and not eat or taking one problem with stumbling to stop walking and not go [anywhere]." About one century later, Liu Xiang's Shuoyuan Chinese: 說苑; pinyin: Shuō yuàn "Garden of Stories" rephrases this simile about choking once and discontinuing grains.

== Agricultural mythology ==
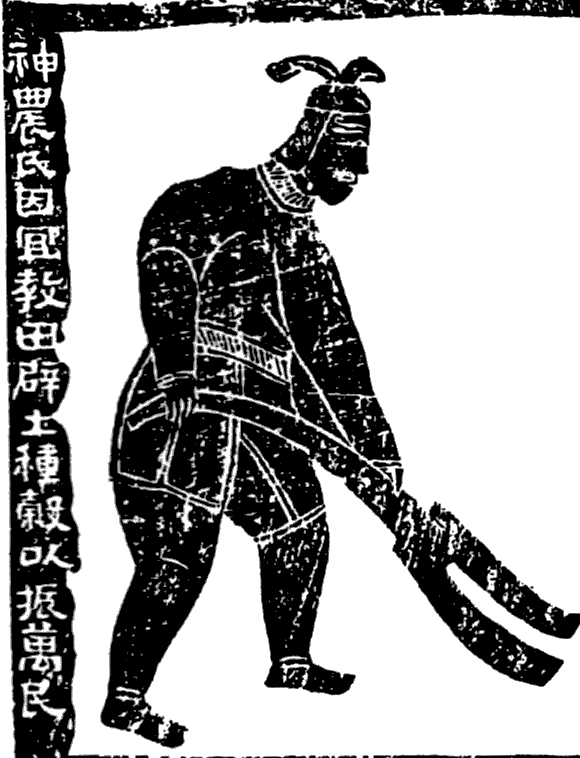
Shennong ploughing fields, Han dynasty mural

Chinese folklore and mythology associated several divinities with agriculture and grains.

- Suiren "Firelighting Person" was a three-eyed sage who discovered how to make fire and invented cooking. This sui 燧 means "flint; bow drill; burning mirror".
- Shennong "Farmer God", also known as Wuguxiandi 五穀先帝 "Emperor of the Five Grains", taught humans agricultural techniques and herbal medicine. Shennong is specifically credited with teaching humans to cultivate and eat the five grains. The list of which grains were counted varied, but the various lists generally include the leguminous soybean, according to Lihui Yang. The (139 BCE) Huainanzi describes Shennong transforming human society from hunter-gatherer to agriculture.

In ancient times, the people fed on herbaceous plants and drank [only] water, picked fruit from shrubs and trees and ate the meat of oysters and clams. They frequently suffered tribulations from feverish maladies and injurious poisons. Consequently, the Divine Farmer first taught the people to plant and cultivate the five grains. He evaluated the suitability of the land, [noting] whether it was dry or wet, fertile or barren, high or low. He tried the taste and flavor of the one hundred plants and the sweetness or bitterness of the streams and springs, issuing directives so the people would know what to avoid and what to accept. At the time [he was doing this], he suffered poisoning [as many as] seventy times a day. (19)

- Houji "Lord Millet" is the god or goddess of agriculture and ancestor of the Zhou people. The Shijing poem Shengmin "Birth of the [Zhou] People" praises Houji for inventing both agriculture and sacrifices.
- Hou Tu "Lord Earth" was the god or goddess deity of the soil, and supposedly the progenitor of the giant Kua Fu. Worshipped at sheji altars.

While traditional Chinese mythology depicted cooking and agriculture as key elements of civilization, the Daoists created a "counter-narrative" to justify the idea of grain avoidance. For example, the Confucianist Xunzi and Legalist Hanfeizi describe Suiren as cultural folk hero.

In the earliest times ... the people lived on fruit, berries, mussels, and clams – things that sometimes became so rank and fetid that they hurt people's stomachs, and many became sick. Then a sage appeared who created the boring of wood to produce fire so as to transform the rank and putrid foods. The people were so delighted by this that they made him ruler of the world and called him the Fire-Drill Man (Suiren 燧人). (Hanfeizi 49)

In contrast, the Zhuangzi "Mending Nature" chapter mentions Suiren first in a list of mythic sage-rulers – Fu Xi, Shennong, Yellow Emperor, Tang of Shang, and Yu the Great, traditionally credited with advancing civilization – but depicts them as villains who began the destruction of the primal harmony of the Dao. Campany calls this "the decline of Power and the ever-farther departure from the natural Dao into systems of social constraint and what passes for culture."

The ancients, in the midst of chaos, were tranquil together with the whole world. At that time, yin and yang were harmoniously still, ghosts and spirits caused no disturbances; the four seasons came in good time; the myriad things went unharmed; the host of living creatures escaped premature death. ... This condition persisted until integrity deteriorated to the point that Torchman [Suiren] and Fuhsi arose to manage all under heaven, whereupon there was accord, but no longer unity. Integrity further declined until the Divine Farmer and the Yellow Emperor arose to manage all under heaven, whereupon there was repose, but no longer accord. Integrity declined still further until T'ang and Yu arose to manage all under heaven. They initiated the fashion of governing by transformation, whereby purity was diluted and simplicity dissipated.

== Grains in Chinese agriculture and culture ==
The traditional Chinese symbol for civilization and state was gu "grains; cereals" (a synecdoche for "agricultural products").

The Wangzhi "Royal Regulations" chapter of the Liji uses cooking food and eating grains to culturally classify the Chinese "Middle Kingdom" bordered by the "Four Barbarians" (eastern Yi, southern Man, western Rong, and northern Di).

Thus the people of the five regions ... each had their several natures, which they could not be made to alter. Those of the east were called Yi; they wore their hair unbound and tattooed their bodies, and some of them ate their food without cooking it. [The people of] the south were called Man; they tattooed their foreheads and had their feet turned in toward each other, and some among them ate their food without cooking it. [The people of] the west were called Rong; they wore their hair unbound and wore skins, and some of them did not eat grain. [The people of] the north were called Di; they wore feathers and furs and lived in caves, and some of them did not eat grain.

Kwang-chih Chang interprets this Liji context to mean, "One could eat grain but also eat raw meat or one could eat his meat cooked but eat no grain. Neither was fully Chinese. A Chinese by definition ate grain and cooked his meat."

During the first dynasties of the Qin and Han, when Daoism simultaneously became a mass movement, Chinese agricultural techniques were revolutionized. Applying methods from the (256 BCE) Dujiangyan Irrigation System, arable land was converted into rice fields, with two or more harvests annually, resulting in widespread deforestation.

The nong 農 "peasant; farmer" was second-highest of the Four Occupations under the traditional Chinese feudal system. Kristofer Schipper says,

The peasants depended entirely on agriculture and were forever tied to their land through all kinds of fiscal and administrative measures. As a result, the rural communities became an easy prey to all the ills of sedentary civilization: ever-higher taxes, enslavement to the government through corvée labor and military draft, epidemics, periodic shortages and famines, and wars and raids by non-Chinese tribes from across the borders.

When natural or human catastrophes occurred, the peasants could take refuge in non-arable regions of mountains and survive on wild foods other than grains.

The sheji (Chinese: 社稷; pinyin: Shèjì") altars to soil and grain gods" were the ritual center of a Chinese state. Originally, she 社 was the "god of the land" and ji 稷 the "god of the harvest" (cf. Houji above), and the compound sheji "gods of soil and grain" metaphorically means "the state; the nation". The Shiji says establishing a new dynasty required eliminating the sheji altars of the preceding dynasty and erecting one's own.

Offerings of grain, liquor (a grain product), and meat were necessary not only for sheji sacrifices but for ancestral sacrifices. The obligation to feed the ancestral dead was fundamental to Chinese society. Campany summarizes the cultural importance of sacrificing "grains" to feed both natural and ancestral spirits.

Grain was, in short, a symbol and summation of culture itself, or rather of nature acculturated, as well as of the completely human community. A natural locus of nutritive "essence" (jing), grain nevertheless required cooperative, communal and differentiated stages of production—planting, tending, harvesting, storing, thrashing, milling, mixing, and cooking—to be transformed into food. Thus transformed, it was perhaps the most culturally celebrated food of humans (both living and dead) and of gods.

The Chinese character for jing (Chinese: 精; pinyin: Jīng) "spirit; essence of life; energy" is written with the rice radical (Chinese: 米; pinyin: Mǐ).

== Early textual references ==
The first textual references to "avoiding grains/cereals" are found in Chinese classics from the Warring States period (475–221 BCE), Qin dynasty (221–206 BCE), and Han dynasty (206 BCE–220 CE).

A (c. 3rd century BCE) Zhuangzi chapter describes a shenren 神人 "divine person" who does not eat grains but mysteriously helps them grow.

Far away on Mount Kuyeh there dwells a spirit man whose skin is like congealed snow and who is gentle as a virgin. He does not eat any of the five grains, but inhales the wind and drinks the dew. He rides on the clouds, drives a flying dragon, and wanders beyond the four seas. His spirit is concentrated, saving things from corruption and bringing a bountiful harvest every year. (1)

In this passage, Maspero recognizes the principal Daoist practices that were current during the Six Dynasties period: "(1) abstention from Cereals, (2) respiratory exercises, and (3) concentration and meditation. The "journey beyond the Four Seas" (4) corresponds to a manner of directing ecstasy," resembling astral projection.

The (168 BCE) Quegu shiqi (Chinese: 卻穀食氣; pinyin: Què gǔ shí qì) "Eliminating Grain and Eating Qi" manuscript, which was discovered in 1973 among the Mawangdui Silk Texts, is the oldest documented grain-avoidance diet. This Chinese medical manual outlines a method for replacing grains with qi circulations, and consuming medicinal herbs, notably the fern shiwei (Chinese: 石韋; pinyin: Shí wéi) "Pyrrosia lingua" as a diuretic to treat urine retention resulting from eliminating grains. This text dichotomizes diets with the square-earth round-heaven model from Chinese cosmography and fengshui, "Those who eat grain eat what is square; those who eat qi eat what is round. Round is heaven; square is earth."

The (139 BCE) Huainanzi chapter on topography (4) correlates diet and lifespan. "Those that feed on flesh are brave and daring but are cruel. Those that feed on qi [attain] spirit illumination and are long-lived. Those that feed on grain are knowledgeable and clever but short-lived. Those that do not feed on anything do not die and are spirits."

Sima Qian's (c. 91 BCE) Records of the Grand Historian (26) mentions bigu in connection with Zhang Liang (262–189 BCE), or the Marquis of Liu, who served as teacher and strategist for Emperor Gaozu of Han (r. 202–195 BCE). Zhang officially requested "to lay aside the affairs of this world, and join the Master of the Red Pine in immortal sport" (referring to Chisongzi (Chinese: 赤松子; pinyin: Chìsōng zǐ)"Master Red Pine", a legendary xian who, like Guiguzi, abstained from grains), and the emperor permitted it. Zhang Liang "set about practising dietary restrictions and breathing and stretching exercises to achieve levitation" (namely, bigu, daoyin, and qingshen (Chinese: 輕身; pinyin: Qīng shēn) "lightening the body"). After Gaozu died, Empress Lü Zhi urged Zhang to eat, saying, "Man's life in this world is as brief as the passing of a white colt glimpsed through a crack in the wall. Why should you punish yourself like this?" Zhang "had no other recourse but to listen to her advice and begin eating again. Eight years later he died." Based upon this account (which is also found in the Lunheng), Campany concludes that by the late 2nd and 1st centuries BCE, "the idea that some practitioners were abstaining from grains while practicing methods for consuming, directing, and cultivating qi as alternate nourishment was ubiquitous and commonplace."

The (c. 111 CE) Book of Han mentions bigu in context with the fangshi "alchemist; magician" Li Shaojun teaching Emperor Wu of Han (r. 141–87 BCE) a "method of worshipping the furnace and abstaining from cereals to prevent old age". Since grains were cooked on the stove, in raw/cooked logic, grain avoidance was traditionally linked with worship of Zaoshen 灶神 The Stove God. In a reversal of not eating the Five Grains to obtain immortality, the Book of Han also records that in 10 CE, the usurper Wang Mang paid the fangshi Su Lo 蘇樂, who claimed to know the xian secrets of longevity, to plant some "immortality grain".

[T]he five grains were planted within the palace in plots facing according to the color of each one. The seeds had been soaked in (a liquid made from) the marrow of the bones of cranes, tortoise-shell (tu mao), rhinoceros (horn), and jade, in all more than twenty constituents. One bushel of this grain cost one piece of gold. This was called Huang Ti's cereal method for becoming a holy immortal.

The Confucian scholar Liu Xiang (79–8 BCE) edited several classical texts, including the (c. 26 BCE) Guanzi that repeatedly praises grain eating. The first chapter "Neiye" "Inner Training" begins by comparing the jing 精 "essence" in grains and stars.

The vital essence of all things: it is this that brings them to life. It generates the five grains below and becomes the constellated stars above. When flowing amid the heavens and earth, we call it ghostly and numinous. When stored within the chests of human beings, we call them sages.

Campany knows of "no text that exalts grains more highly or insists on their importance more strongly than the Guanzi." Compare: "The five grains and the eating of rice are the people's Director of Allotted Lifespans" (i.e., Siming) and "In all cases the five grains are the controllers of all things" (meaning the market price of grains affects all economic values).

Liu Xiang's hagiography of Daoist xian, the Liexian Zhuan "Collected Biographies of Immortals", tells the famous "Hairy Woman" legend in terms of grain avoidance.

During the reign of Emperor Cheng of the Han, hunters in the Zhongnan Mountains saw a person who wore no clothes, his body covered with black hair. Upon seeing this person, the hunters wanted to pursue and capture him, but the person leapt over gullies and valleys as if in flight, and so could not be overtaken. The hunters then stealthily observed where the person dwelled, surrounded and captured him, whereupon they determined that the person was a woman. Upon questioning, she said, "I was originally a woman of the Qin palace. When I heard that invaders from the east had arrived, that the King of Qin would go out and surrender, and that the palace buildings would be burned, I fled in fright into the mountains. Famished, I was on the verge of dying by starvation when an old man taught me to eat the resin and nuts of pines. At first, they were bitter, but gradually I grew accustomed to them. They enabled me to feel neither hunger nor thirst; in winter I was not cold, in summer I was not hot." Calculation showed that the woman, having been a member of the Qin King Ziying's harem, must be more than two hundred years old in the present time of Emperor Cheng. The hunters took the woman back in. They offered her grain to eat. When she first smelled the stink of the grain, she vomited, and only after several days could she tolerate it. After little more than two years of this [diet], her body hair fell out; she turned old and died. Had she not been caught by men, she would have become a transcendent.

Campany states, "Few narratives more succinctly summarize the argument that ordinary foods or "grains" block the path to transcendence." Ge Hong's (3rd century) Shenxian zhuan gives a different version – including the Hairy Woman's name of Yu Qiang and not mentioning her being captured or fed grains. According to Daoist tradition, the Qin dynasty transcendent Han Zhong (fl. 215–210 BCE) ate Acorus calamus (sweet flag) for thirteen years and developed thick body hair that protected him from cold in winter.

Two chapters of Wang Chong's (c. 80 CE) Lunheng criticize the practice of avoiding grains as mistaken. The "Daoist Untruths" chapter uses Li Shao Jun, who "knew some clever maneuvers and some fine tricks, which did not fail to produce a wonderful effect", to exemplify confusing Daoist xian immortality techniques with natural longevity.

There are no instances of any one having obtained Tao, but there have been very long-lived persons. People remarking that those persons, while studying Tao and the art of immortality, become over a hundred years old without dying, call them immortals, as the following example will show. At the time of Han Wu Ti there lived a certain Li Shao Chün, who pretended that by sacrificing to the "Hearth" and [bigu] abstaining from eating grain he could ward off old age. He saw the emperor, who conferred high honours upon him.

This context also mentions Wang Ziquiao 王子僑, a son of King Ling of Zhou (r. 571–545 BCE).

The idea prevails that those who [bigu] abstain from eating grain are men well versed in the art of Tao. They say e.g. that Wang Tse Ch'iao and the like, because they did not touch grain, and lived on different food than ordinary people, had not the same length of life as ordinary people, in so far as having passed a hundred years, they transcended into another state of being, and became immortals. That is another mistake. Eating and drinking are natural impulses, with which we are endowed at birth. Hence, the upper part of the body has a mouth and teeth, the inferior part orifices. With the mouth and teeth one chews and eats, the orifices are for the discharge. Keeping in accord with one's nature, one follows the law of heaven, going against it, one violates one's natural propensities, and neglects one's natural spirit before heaven. How can one obtain long life in this way?

The Lunheng "Meaning of Sacrifice" chapter mentions juegu in criticizing the tradition of presenting food and wine sacrifices to ancestral spirits.

The votaries of Taoism studying the art of immortality abstain from eating cereals and take other food than other people with a view to purifying themselves. Ghosts and spirits, however, are still more ethereal than immortals, why then should they use the same food as man? One assumes that after death man loses his consciousness, and that his soul cannot become a spirit. But let us suppose that he did, then he would use different food, and using different food, he would not have to eat human food. Not eating human food, he would not ask us for it, and having nothing to ask at the hands of man, he could not give luck or mishap.

Lu Jia's (Chinese: 陸賈; pinyin: Lù jiǎ) (c. 191 BCE) Xinyu(Chinese: 新語; pinyin: Xīnyǔ) "New Sayings" criticizes bigu among other early Daoist xian transcendental practices.

[If a man] treats his body bitterly and harshly and goes deep into the mountains in search of hsien immortality, [if he] leaves behind his parents, casts aside his kindred, abstains from the five grains, gives up classical learning, thus running counter to what is cherished by Heaven and Earth in quest of the way of "no death," then he is in no way to communicate with this world or to prevent what is not right from happening.

The (c. 190–220 CE) Xiang'er commentary to the Daodejing contrasts qi-eaters and grain-eaters.

Transcendent nobles (xianshi 仙士) differ from the vulgar in that they do not value glory, rank, or wealth. They value only "drawing sustenance from the mother"—that is, [from] their own bodies. In the interior of the body, the "mother" is the stomach, which governs the qi of the five viscera. Commoners eat grain, and when the grain is gone, they die. Transcendent nobles eat grain when they have it, and when they do not, they consume qi. The qi returns to the stomach, which is the layered sack of the bowels.

Ge Hong's (c. 320 CE) Baopuzi contains classical discussions of bigu techniques. For instance, chapter 6, "The Meaning of 'Subtle'" (微旨), equates grain avoidance with the supernatural abilities of a xian transcendent.

Therefore, by giving up starches one can become immune to weapons, exorcize demons, neutralize poisons, and cure illnesses. On entering a mountain, he can render savage beasts harmless. When he crosses streams, no harm will be done to him by dragons. There will be no fear when plague strikes; and when a crisis or difficulty suddenly arises, you will know how to cope with it. (6)

Chapter 15, "Miscellanea" (Chinese: 雜應; pinyin: Zá yīng), describes "avoiding grains" in terms that Campany says are "tantamount to not eating food at all" and "merely swallowing saliva and qi and ingesting medicinal preparations to suppress appetite and strengthen the body." The chapter begins with the interlocutor asking about duangu "cutting off grains" and changsheng (Chinese: 長生; pinyin: Chángshēng)"longevity" (meaning "eternal life" in Daoist terminology). "I should like to inquire whether a man can attain Fullness of Life by merely dispensing with starches. How many methods for this are there altogether, and which is the best?" Ge Hong gives a lengthy answer, citing both personal observations and textual records. Practitioners medicinally used huangqing (Chinese: 黃精; pinyin: Huáng jīng) "yellow essence" ("polygonatum; Solomon's Seal") and yuyu 禹餘糧 "Yu's leftover grain" ("limonite").

By dispensing with starches a man can only stop spending money on grains, but by that alone he cannot attain Fullness of Life. When I inquired of people who had been doing without starches for a long time, they replied that they were in better health than when they were eating starches. When they took thistle and nibbled mercury and when they also took pills of brown hematite twice a day, this triple medication produced an increase in breaths, so that they gained the strength to carry loads on long trips, for their bodies became extremely light in weight. One such full treatment protected the patients' inner organs for five to ten years, but when they swallowed their breaths, took amulets, or drank brine, only loss of appetite resulted, and they did not have the strength for hard work. The Taoist writings may say that if one wishes Fullness of Life the intestines must be clean, and if immortality is desired the intestines must be without feces; but they also say that those eating greens will be good walkers, but at the same time stupid; that those eating meat will be very strong, and also brave. Those eating starches will be wise, but they will not live to an old age, while those eating breath will have gods and spirits within them that never die. This last, however, is only a biased claim advanced by the school that teaches the circulation of breaths. One has no right to claim to use this method exclusively. If you wish to take the great medicines of gold or cinnabar, they will act more quickly if you fast for the preceding hundred days or so. If you cannot fast that long, take them straightway; this will do no great harm, but it will take more time to acquire geniehood. (15)

Warning that abandoning grains is difficult – "If you consider it inconvenient to break with the world, abandon your household, and live high on a peak, you will certainly not succeed" – Ge Hong notes the popularity of alternative dietary techniques.

If you would not distress yourself, it is best not to dispense with starches but merely to regulate the diet, for which there are about a hundred methods. Sometimes, after a few dozen pills of interior-protecting medicines have been taken, it is claimed that appetite is lost for forty or fifty days. (Other times, one or two hundred days are claimed, or the pills must be taken for days or months.) Refined pine and cypress as well as thistle can also protect the interior, but they are inferior to the great medicines, and last only ten years or less. At other times, fine foods are first prepared and consumed to utter satiation, and then medicines are taken to nurture the things that have been eaten, so that they may not be digested. This is claimed to remain valid for three years. If you then wish to revert to the eating of starches, it is necessary to start by swallowing mallows and lard, so that the fine food you prepared will pass from you undigested. (15)

Ge Hong chronicles the effects of grain avoidance.

I have personally observed for two or three years men, who were foregoing starches, and in general their bodies were slight and their complexions good. They could withstand wind, cold, heat, or dampness, but there was not a fat one among them. I admit that I have not yet met any who had not eaten starches in several decades, but if some people cut off from starches for only a couple of weeks die while these others look as well as they do after years, why should we doubt that the (deliberate) fasting could be prolonged still further? If those cut off from starches grow progressively weaker to death, one would normally fear that such a diet simply cannot be prolonged, but inquiry of those pursuing this practice reveals that at first all of them notice a lessening of strength, but that later they gradually get stronger month by month and year by year. Thus, there is no impediment to the possibility of prolongation. All those who have found the divine process for attaining Fullness of Life succeeded by taking medicines and swallowing breath; on this they are all in perfect agreement. A moment of crisis, however, generally occurs at an early stage when medicines are being taken and starches abandoned and it is only after forty days of progressive weakening, as one uses only holy water and feeds solely on breath, that one regains strength. (15)

This "holy water" refers to a Daoist fu (Chinese: 符; pinyin: Fú) "talisman" dissolved in water. Ge Hong further cites an Eastern Wu historical example to show that drinking holy water cannot prevent death. When Emperor Jing of Wu (r. 258–264) heard about Shi Chun (Chinese: 石春; pinyin: Shí chūn), a Daoist healer "who would not eat in order to hasten the cure when he was treating a sick person," he exclaimed,

"In a short time this man is going to starve to death." Then he had him locked up and guarded, and all that Shih Ch'un requested was two or three quarts of water for making holy water. It went on like this for more than a year, while his complexion became ever fresher and his strength remained normal. The emperor then asked him how much longer he could continue like this, and Shih Ch'un replied that there was no limit; possibly several dozen years, his only fear being that he might die of old age, but it would not be of hunger. The emperor then discontinued the experiment and sent him away. Note that Shih Ch'un's statement shows that giving up starches cannot protract one's years. Some today possess Shih Ch'un's method. (15)

In the Baopuzi, Ge Hong criticizes contemporary charlatans who claimed to have duangu "cut off grains".

I have also frequently seen ignorant processors who, wishing to boast and amaze and acquire a reputation for not eating when they really knew nothing about such procedures, merely claimed not to eat gruel. Meanwhile, they would drink more than a gallon of wine daily, and dried meats, puddings, jujubes, chestnuts, or eggs were never out of their mouths. Sometimes they would eat large quantities of meat – several dozen pounds daily – swallowing its juices and spitting out anything that was unpleasant. This, however, is actually feasting. Wine drinkers will eat dried meats with their wine but not starches, and they can keep this up for six months to a year without stumbling or falling. Never yet, however, have they claimed that this was "cut off from starches!" (15)

The (c. 4th–5th century) Taishang Lingbao Wufuxu (Chinese: 太上靈寶五符序; pinyin: Tài shàng líng bǎo wǔ fú xù) "Explanations of the Five Numinous Treasure Talismans", attributed to the Han Daoist Lezichang (Chinese: 樂子長; pinyin: Lèzi zhǎng), gives instructions for practicing bigu, swallowing saliva, and ingesting the "five wonder plants" (pine resin, sesame, pepper, ginger, and calamus). This "Explanations" text includes the (c. 280) Lingbao wufu jing (Chinese: 靈寶五符經; pinyin: Líng bǎo wǔ fú jīng) "Scripture of the Five Numinous Treasure Talismans", which says:

The Third Immortal King told the Emperor: In the old days I followed a dietetic regimen and attained immortality. My teacher made me increase the sweet spring in my mouth and swallow it in accordance with the following incantation: "The white stones, hard and rocky, are rolling on and on. The gushing spring, bubbling and pervasive, becomes a thick juice. Drink it and attain long life – Longevity forever longer!" These twenty-two words—you should follow them! If you can actually do this and nourish on the True One without stopping, swallow from your flowery pond without interruption, then your inner energy will grow and remain strong, never to be weakened. You attain the Tao by avoiding all grains. You will never again have to follow the rhythm of the moon and plant or harvest. Now, the people of mysterious antiquity, they reached old age because they remained in leisure and never ate any grains. As the Dayou zhang [(Chinese: 大有章; pinyin: Dà yǒu zhāng)] (Verse of Great Existence) says: "The five grains are chisels cutting life away, making the five organs stink and shorten our spans. Once entered into our stomach, there's no more chance to live quite long. To strive for complete avoidance of all death, keep your intestines free of excrement!"

Campany uses internalism and externalism to analyze how early texts justified the idea that shiqi (Chinese: 食氣; pinyin: Shí qì)"eating qi" is better than shigu "eating grains". For examples, "We eat X because X makes us live long" is an internalist rationale based upon essential properties or benefits; "We eat X and not Y, which is what those other people eat" is an externalist claim based upon cultural stereotypes. After comprehensive analysis of how early texts describe "grain" (i.e., "mainstream food") avoidance, from the (c. 320 BCE) Zhuangzi to the (c. 320 CE) Baopuzi, Campany concludes the (c. 280 CE) Lingbao wufu jing is the earliest passage "in which grains are attacked as a food source based on what we might call negative internalist reasons—that is, on the grounds that they cause actual harm to the body in specific, theorized ways." Before the 3rd century, Chinese classical texts did not claim that "grains" actually harm the body, they argued that " qi and other more refined substances, when ingested and circulated in esoterically prescribed ways, give superior and (for some texts at least) longevity-inducing nourishment."

One of the striking things about the texts we have reviewed is that most of them offer very little by way of an internalist critique of grains or other everyday foods. That is, they all recommend avoiding grains and offer what they tout as superior alternatives, but on the question of precisely why grains are such inferior nourishment they have little or nothing to say. What little internalist critique we do find comes quite late — apparently Eastern Han at the earliest — and does not seem well developed: ordinary foods, described as rotten and smelly, impurify a body that must be brought into qi-based resonance with heaven. This impurity is located specifically in the intestines. [...] In most discussions, then, it is not that prescribers and practitioners of transcendence arts portrayed ordinary food as harmful; it is rather that they had what they considered superior alternatives to offer. [... But,] why these diets of qi or of rare herbs and minerals should be regarded as superior to one of ordinary food is a question that very often remains unanswered; we are merely, but repeatedly and in diverse ways, told that they are superior.

Echoing Claude Lévi-Strauss, Campany suggests that grains, inexorably linked with all their cultural and institutional symbolisms, were "good to oppose" rather than being seen as intrinsically "bad to eat." One of the major reasons for consuming wild plants and exotic foods was the inherent contrast with eating everyday "grains".

== Daoist rejection of grain ==
The avoidance of "grain" signifies the Daoist rejection of common social practices. According to Kohn, "It is a return to a time in the dawn of humanity when there were as yet no grains; it is also a return to a more primitive and simple way of eating."

Daoist bigu practices created excuses to quit the agricultural-based Chinese society in which grains were necessary for basic food, ancestral sacrifices, and tax payments:

The "cutting off" of grains, which were the basic staple food for the peasants, was also a rejection of their sedentary life and the peasant condition as such. This refusal should not solely be interpreted in the light of the miseries endured by farmers, but also in a much more fundamental way. Agriculture has occasioned, since Neolithic times, a radical break with the way of life that prevailed for almost the entire prehistory of humankind. Agriculture has also been the main culprit of the imbalances of human civilization over the last ten thousand years or so: the systematic destruction of the natural environment, overpopulation, capitalization, and other evils that result from sedentariness.

Grain abstention was prerequisite for the Daoist practice of yangxing 養性 "nourishing the inner nature". Maspero explains:

Nourishing the Vital Principle consists in suppressing the causes of death and creating in oneself the immortal body which will replace the mortal body. The causes of death are especially the Breath of Grains and the Breath of Bloody Food: hence the alimentary regimens which are designated by the generic name Abstinence from Grains. One must succeed in replacing vulgar food with the Food of the Breath, like an aerophagia which consists of breathing air in, holding it in as long as possible without allowing it to escape and, while it is held in, making it pass, in identical mouthfuls with great gulps of water, from the trachea into the esophagus, so that it can be sent on into the stomach like real food. The body is made of Breaths, like all things; but it is made of coarse breaths, whereas air is a light, subtle and pure Breath. Vulgar food, after digestion, supplies the body with the Breaths of the Five Flavors, common and impure Breaths which make it heavy. By contrast, Food of the Breath little by little replaces the coarse matter of the body with light, pure Breaths; and when the transformation is completed, the body is immortal.

Some versions of "grain avoidance" could result in health problems, as discussed by Maspero:

This very severe diet was not without its painful moments. Without grains and meat, whoever practices it is undernourished; and the Taoist authors admit that at the beginning one may have numerous troubles, some of them general (vertigo, weakness, sleepiness, difficulties in moving), others local (diarrhea, constipation, and so on). Nevertheless, they advise persevering, insisting that these disappear after several weeks and that the body soon feels as before, and even better: more calm and more at ease. They also advise practicing it only gradually, and they recommend a number of drugs for the period of transition and adaptation which, according to them, lasts thirty to forty days. The recipes for drugs to help in the practice of Abstention from Cereals are numerous: ginseng, cinnamon, pachyma cocos [i.e., Fu Ling], sesame, digitalis, licorice, and all the traditional Chinese tonics play a preponderant role in them.

Chinese Buddhism adopted Daoist grain abstention as a preparation for self-immolation. For instance, the monk Huiyi 慧益 (d. 463), who vowed to burn his body in sacrifice to the Buddha, began preparations by queli "abstaining from grains" (eating only sesame and wheat) for two years, then consumed only oil of thyme, and finally ate only pills made of incense. Although Emperor Xiaowu of Liu Song (r. 453–464) tried to dissuade Huiyi, he publicly immolated himself in a cauldron full of oil, wearing an oil-soaked cap to act as a wick, while chanting the Lotus Sutra.

== The Three Corpses or Worms ==
Avoiding grains was the primary medical cure for eliminating the sanshi 三尸 "Three Corpses" or sanchong 三蟲 "Three Worms", which are evil spirits believed to live in the human body and hasten death. Livia Kohn describes the Three Corpses as "demonic supernatural creatures who feed on decay and are eager for the body to die altogether so they can devour it. Not only do they thus shorten the lifespan but they also delight in the decaying matter produced by the grains as they are digested in the intestines. If one is to attain long life, the three worms have to be starved, and the only way to do so is to avoid all grain."

Traditional Chinese medicine links the mythological Three Corpses/Worms with the intestinal jiuchong 九蟲 "Nine Worms", which "correspond to parasites such as roundworms or tapeworms, weaken the host's body and cause a variety of physical symptoms".

The Three Corpses allegedly enter the human body at birth, and reside in the Upper, Middle, and Lower Dantian "Cinnabar Fields" within the brain, heart, and abdomen, respectively. After their host dies, they become ghosts and are free to roam about stealing sacrificial offerings. These pernicious corpse-worms seek to harm both their host's body and fate. First, they weaken the bodily Dantian energy centers. Second, the Three Corpses keep records or their host's misdeeds, ascend to tian "heaven" bimonthly on the Chinese sexagenary cycle day gengshen 庚申 "57th of the 60", and file reports to the Siming 司命 "Director of Destinies" who assigns punishments to shorten the host's lifespan. For genghsen days, the (4th century) Huangtingjing 黃庭經 "Yellow Court Scripture" says, "Do not sleep either day or night, and you shall become immortal."

In addition to the Three Corpses making a bimonthly report to the Director of Fate, the Baopuzi records the Hearth God making one.

It is also said that there are Three Corpses in our bodies, which, though not corporeal, actually are of a type with our inner, ethereal breaths, the powers, the ghosts, and the gods. They want us to die prematurely. (After death they become a man's ghost and move about at will to where sacrifices and libations are being offered.) Therefore, every fifty-seventh day of the sixty-day cycle they mount to heaven and personally report our misdeeds to the Director of Fates. Further, during the night of the last day of the month the hearth god also ascends to heaven and makes an oral report of a man's wrongs. For the more important misdeeds a whole period of three hundred days is deducted. For the minor ones they deduct one reckoning, a reckoning being three days. Personally, I have not yet been able to determine whether this is really so or not, but that is because the ways of heaven are obscure, and ghosts and gods are hard to understand. (6)

Bigu abstinence from grains and cereals, which allegedly makes the Three Corpses waste away, is the basis for many Daoist dietetic regimens, which can also exclude wine, meat, onion, and garlic. The Jinjian yuzi jing 金簡玉字經 "Classic of Jade Characters on Slips of Gold" specifies, "Those who, in their food, cut off cereals must not take wine, nor meat, nor plants of the five strong flavors; they must bathe, wash their garments, and burn incense." Practicing bigu alone cannot eliminate the Three Corpses, but will weaken them to the point where they can be killed with alchemical drugs, particularly cinnabar.

Early Daoist texts and traditions portray the Three Corpses in both "zoomorphic and bureaucratic metaphors". The (4th century CE) Ziyang zhenren neizhuan 紫陽真人內傳 "Inner Biography of the True Person of Purple Yang" described them living in the Three Cinnabar Fields.

- Qīnggǔ 青古 "Old Blue" dwells in the Muddy Pellet Palace within the Upper Dantian, "It is he who makes men blind, or deaf, or bald, who makes the teeth fall out, who stops up the nose and gives bad breath."
- Bái gū 白姑 "White Maiden" dwells in the Crimson Palace within the Middle Field, "She causes palpitations of the heart, asthma, and melancholy."
- Xuè shī 血尸 "Bloody Corpse" dwells in the Lower Dantian, "It is through him that the intestines are painfully twisted, that the bones are dried out, that the skin withers, that the limbs have rheumatisms..."

Compare the (9th century) Chu sanshi jiuchong baosheng jing "Scripture on Expelling the Three Corpses and Nine Worms to Protect Life" description.

- The upper corpse, Péng jū 彭琚, lives in the head. Symptoms of its attack include a feeling of heaviness in the head, blurred vision, deafness, and excessive flow of tears and mucus.
- The middle corpse, Péng zàn 彭瓚, dwells in the heart and stomach. It attacks the heart, and makes its host crave sensual pleasures.
- The lower corpse, Péng jiǎo 彭矯, resides in the stomach and legs. It causes the Ocean of Pneuma ... to leak, and makes its host lust after women.

This text's woodblock illustrations depict the upper corpse as a scholarly man, the middle as a short quadruped, and the lower corpse as "a monster that looks like a horse's leg with a horned human head".

The Japanese folk tradition of Kōshin (namely, the Japanese pronunciation of gengshen 庚申 "57th") combines the Daoist Three Corpses with Shintō and Buddhist beliefs, including the Three Wise Monkeys. People attend Kōshin-Machi 庚申待 "57th Day Waiting" events to stay awake all night and prevent the Sanshi 三尸 "Three Corpses" from leaving the body and reporting misdeeds to heaven.

== Famine foods ==
Famine food plants, which are not normally considered as crops, are consumed during times of extreme poverty, starvation, or famine. Bigu diets were linked with mountain wilderness areas in which one relied upon non-grain foods, including famine foodstuffs and underutilized crops. Despeux said, "Abstention from cereals should also be situated in the historical context of social unrest and famine."

The Mouzi Lihuolun introduction describes people who fled China after the death of Emperor Ling of Han and moved south to Cangwu in Jiaozhou (present day Tonkin).

It happened that, after the death of Emperor Ling (189 C.E.), the world was in disorder. Since only Chiao-chou [a colonial district in the far south] remained relatively peaceful, otherworldly people from the north came en masse and settled there. Many of them practiced the methods of the spirit immortals, abstaining from grains to prolong life. These methods were popular then, but Mou-tzu unceasingly refuted them by employing the Five Classics, and none among the Taoist adepts or the Magicians dared engage him in debate. (1)

These refutations of grain avoidance are found in Mouzi Lihuolun Article 30.

The Baopuzi discussion of grain abstention notes,

Should you take to the mountains and forests during political troubles, you will avoid dying of starvation by observing the rule about starches. Otherwise, do not rush into this practice, for rushing cannot be very beneficial. If you dispense with meat while living among others, you will find it impossible not to desire it deep in your heart when you smell its fat or freshness. (15)

The Chinese published the oldest book on famine foods: the Jiuhuang Bencao 救荒本草 "Materia Medica for the Relief of Famine". Zhu Su 朱橚 (1361–1425), the fifth son of the Hongwu Emperor, compiled this treatise describing 414 famine food plants. Bernard Read (1946) translated the Jiuhuang bencao into English.

== Modern interpretations ==
Schipper uses medical terminology to explain grain avoidance.

One can advance positive explanations for this belief, and the practice that derives from it, if one thinks, for example, of the relative abundance of feces produced by cereals as compared to that produced by a diet of meat. The conclusion of recent studies on the harmful effect of excessive amounts of carbohydrates in the form of sugar and bread, have led some to see the Taoist abstinence from cereals as the result of an ancient empiricism in matters of diet.

Some contemporary researchers are clinically investigating bigu fasting.

== See also ==
- Anqi Sheng
- Chinese food therapy
- Chinese philosophy
- Lunheng
- Macrobiotic diet
- Neidan
- Yangsheng (Daoism)
