= Huangdi hama jing =

The Huangdi hama jing (Chinese: 黃帝蝦蟆經; pinyin: Huángdì hámá jīng), translated into English as the Yellow Emperor's Toad Canon, is a Chinese medical text believed to have been written during the Han dynasty. Although the original manuscript is no longer extant, much of the text was quoted in the Ishinpō, the oldest surviving Japanese medical compendium.

== Composition ==
A Japanese woodblock text titled Weisheng huibian (衛生彙編), dated to 1823, contains content ostensibly copied from a Chinese text known as the Huangdi zhenjiu hama ji (黃帝鍼灸蝦蟆忌), or the Yellow Emperor's Toad Prohibition for Acupuncture and Cauterisation, which is recorded in the Book of Sui. Another source cited in Weisheng huibian is the Taiping yulan. The Taiping yulan in turn refers to the Baopuzi, which supposedly refers to a hama tu (蝦蟆圖) or "toad chart" in the now missing Huangdi yijing (黃帝醫經), although the extant version of the Baopuzi does not contain such a citation.
