= Zhubing yuanhou lun =

Ancient Chinese medical text

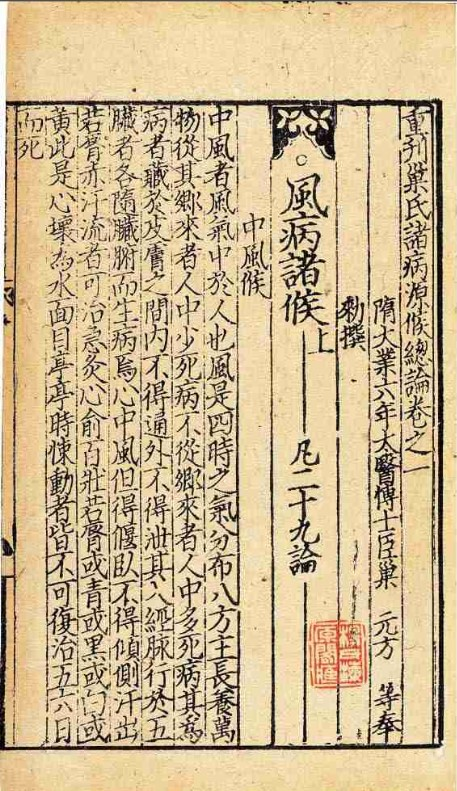

Zhubing yuanhou lun (Chinese: 諸病源候論; pinyin: Zhūbìng yuánhòu lùn), (Note: Translated into English as Discourse on the Origins and Symptoms of All Diseases, Discussions on Causes and Manifestations of Various Illnesses, Treatise on Disease Causality, or Treatise on the Origin and Symptoms of Diseases.) also known as Zhubing yuanhou zonglun (Chinese: 諸病源候總論; pinyin: Zhūbìng yuánhòu zǒnglùn) (Note: Or General Treatise on the Etiology and Symptomology of Diseases.) or Chaoshi bingyuan (Chinese: 巢氏病源; pinyin: Cháoshì bìngyuán), (Note: Or Mr Chao's Origin of Diseases.) is a Chinese monograph comprising fifty volumes. Written during the Sui dynasty (581–618), its authorship has been popularly attributed to court physician Chao Yuanfang, although this is contradicted by some early sources. Discussing some 1739 syndromes and sixty-seven disease categories, the Zhubing yuanhou lun is the oldest extant medical encyclopedia on disease aetiology and symptomatology in traditional Chinese medicine.

== Contents ==
The text is divided into fifty volumes. It discusses some 1739 illnesses that are classified under categories including dermatology; gynaecology; ophthalmology; otorhinolaryngology; urology; paediatrics; and surgery. Instead of prescribing herbal therapy or acupuncture, the text recommends qigong as a cure for most diseases.

== Authorship ==
According to the preface of one surviving manuscript, written by Song Shou, the text was written by court physician Chao Yuanfang, who "collected and compiled the pith of the various scholarly opinions by an intensive study of them and sorted them all out" during the reign of Emperor Yang of Sui. However, according to researchers Yan Liang, Abdulbaset M. Salim, Wendy Wu, and Paul E. Kilgore, "it is far from certain that the sole author ... is Chao Yuanfang." The Suishu jingji zhi (隋書經籍志), compiled between 641 and 656, identifies Wu Jingxian (吳景賢) as the author of the Zhubing yuanhou lun. On the other hand, the Jiutangshu jingji zhi (旧唐书经籍志), compiled during the Later Jin Dynasty, claims that the text was written by Wu Jing (吴景).

== Legacy ==
The Zhubing yuanhou lun is the oldest extant medical encyclopedia on disease aetiology and symptomatology in traditional Chinese medicine. The text was well-received upon its initial publication in the Sui dynasty, as well as later on in the succeeding Tang and Song dynasties, when it became a mainstream medical textbook. From the early 8th century onwards, it was introduced to the rest of the world and was extensively quoted in works like the earliest surviving Japanese medical text, the Ishinpō, and Avicenna's Canon of Medicine.
