= Chao Yuanfang =

Chinese physician and medical author

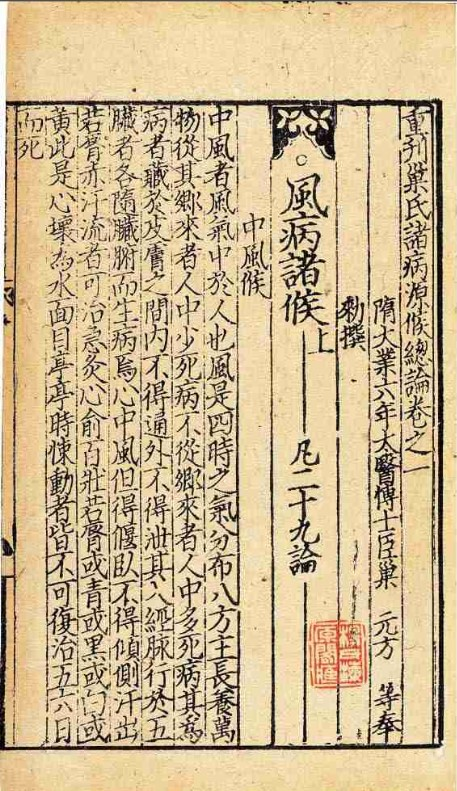
:Page from the Zhubing Yuanhou Lun from a Yuan dynasty edition

Chao Yuanfang (Chinese: 巢元方; pinyin: Cháo Yuánfāng) was a Chinese physician and medical author who was court physician at the Sui dynasty (581–618 CE) between the years 605 and 616. Traditionally, he had been attributed the co-authorship or authorship of the Chinese medical classic Zhubing yuanhou lun. This work sets out a classification of diseases and describes their causes and symptoms. It also discusses therapeutic methods. The Zhubing yuanhou lun had an important influence on the development of Chinese medicine. Its influence also extended to Japan where it formed the inspiration for the Ishinpō, the oldest surviving Japanese medical text completed in 984.

== Life ==
Very few details have been preserved about the life of Chao Yuanfang. He is referred to in old texts as a medical erudite (Chinese: 太醫博士; pinyin: tàiyī bóshì). Historical records indicate that Chao Yuanfang lived during the final years of the Sui dynasty (581–618 CE) and the early years of the Tang dynasty (618–906 CE). During the Daye reign (605–618 CE) of the Sui dynasty he was appointed as the Academician of the Imperial Medical Academy and later promoted to the post of Court Physician.

== Zhubing Yuanhou Lun ==
Scholarship does not agree on the authorship of the Zhubing yuanhou lun 諸病源候論 (General Treatise on Causes and Manifestations of All Diseases). The Suishu jingji zhi (Chinese: 隋書經籍志; pinyin: Suíshū jīngjí zhì), a bibliography included in the official history of the Sui dynasty and compiled between 641 and 656, identifies Wu Jingxian (Chinese: 吳景賢; pinyin: Wú Jǐngxián) as the author. In the Jiutangshu jingji zhi (Chinese: 旧唐书·经籍志; pinyin: Jiùtángshū jīngjí zhì), the bibliography of the Old Book of the Tang dynasty compiled during the rule of the Later Jin dynasty 後晉 (936-946), Wu Jing (Chinese: 吴景; pinyin: Wú Jǐng) is named the author of the work. The name Chao Yuanfang is first recorded as the author of the work in historical records from the Song dynasty (960–1279). Further reference to Chao Yuanfan's participation in the authoring of the book is found in an edition of the Zhubing yuanhou lun published during the Northern Song dynasty. The preface to that edition states that the work was written during the Daiye period of the Sui dynasty by the imperial physician Chao Yuanfang and others pursuant to an imperial decree. The preface further describes that the authors compiled the work by gathering the most authoritative writings from various schools of thought and studying these thoroughly. The work was then submitted to the throne in 610.

The Zhubing yuanhou lun has been integrally preserved and is divided into 50 chapters (scrolls). It discusses more than 1,700 syndromes, which are classified into 67 symptom categories of internal and external diseases. The final chapters deal with gynaecology, obstetrics and pediatrics. It is the first Chinese text that deals with etiology and symptomatology. It also discusses therapeutic methods. The therapeutic methods proposed are not the traditional medicines or acupuncture of Chinese medicine, but therapies based on such practices as diet and daoyin. Tao yin is sometimes referred to as Taoist yoga and consists of a series of exercises (mainly in lying and sitting positions, but also in standing positions) that are intended to cultivate qi, the internal energy of the body according to Traditional Chinese Medicine. The practice of Tao yin is a precursor of qigong, The Zhubing yuanhou lun prescribes 213 Tao yin exercises for 110 different symptoms. The Zhubing yuanhou lun had an important influence on the development of Chinese medicine. Its influence also extended to Japan where it formed the inspiration for the Ishinpō, the oldest surviving Japanese medical text completed in 984.

== Editions ==
- Chinese-language edition of the Zhubing Yuanhou Lun at archive.org
