= Chinese food therapy =

Chinese dietary or food therapy

Alternative medicine
- Claims: Health claims relating to Chinese diet
- Related fields: Traditional Chinese medicine

Chinese food therapy (simplified Chinese: 食疗; traditional Chinese: 食療; pinyin: shíliáo; lit. 'food therapy', also called nutrition therapy and dietary therapy) is a mode of dieting rooted in Chinese beliefs concerning the effects of food on the human organism, and centered on concepts such as seasonal eating and in moderation. Its basic precepts are a mix of Taoist Wuxing and eight principle theory that are concepts drawn from the modern representation of traditional Chinese medicine. Food that conform to the mode are called yàoshàn (药膳; 藥膳; 'drug-food')).

Food therapy has long been a common approach to health among Chinese people both in China and overseas, and was popularized for western readers in the 1990s with the publication of books like The Tao of Healthy Eating (Flaws 1995a) and The Wisdom of the Chinese Kitchen (Young 1999).

== Origins ==
A number of ancient Chinese cookbooks and treatises on food (now lost) display an early Chinese interest in food, but no known focus on its medical value. The literature on "nourishing life" (养生; 養生; yǎngshēng) integrated advice on food within broader advice on how to attain immortality. Such books, however, are only precursors of "dietary therapy", because they did not systematically describe the effect of individual food items. In the volume on "Fermentations and Food Science" of Joseph Needham's Science and Civilization in China, H. T. Huang considers the Recipes for Fifty-Two Ailments (c. 200 BCE) and the Yellow Emperor's Inner Canon as precursors of the "dietary therapy" tradition, the former because it recommends food products as remedies for various illnesses, the latter because it discusses the impact of food on health. The materia medica literature, exemplified by the Shennong Bencao Jing (1st century CE), also discussed food products, but without specializing on them.

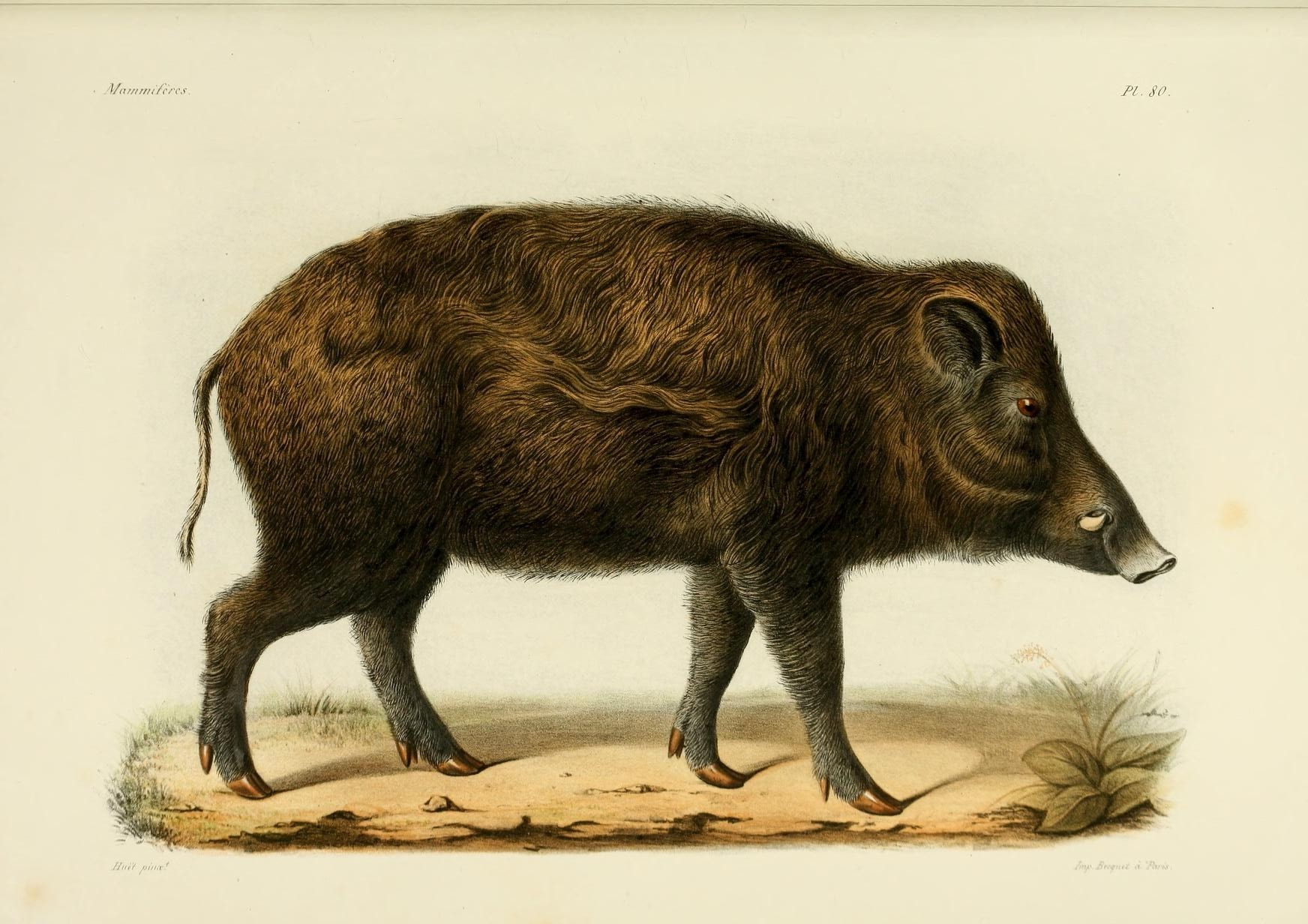
The Shiliao Bencao stated that many parts of the wild boar could be used therapeutically. Boar gallstones, powdered and decocted, could cure epidemics. Boar teeth, burnt to ashes and ingested, could alleviate the symptoms of snakebites. And refined boar fat taken with cereal wine could help nursing women produce more milk.

The earliest extant Chinese dietary text is a chapter of Sun Simiao's Prescriptions Worth a Thousand Gold (千金方; qiānjīn fāng), which was completed in the 650s during the Tang dynasty. Sun's work contains the earliest known use of the term "food (or dietary) therapy" (shiliao). Sun stated that he wanted to present current knowledge about food so that people would first turn to food rather than drugs when suffering from an ailment. His chapter contains 154 entries divided into four sections – on fruits, vegetables, cereals, and meat – in which Sun explains the properties of individual foodstuffs with concepts borrowed from the Yellow Emperor's Inner Canon: qi, the viscera, and vital essence (精; jīng), as well as correspondences between the Five Phases, the "five flavors" (sour, bitter, sweet, pungent, and salty), and the five grains. He also set a large number of "dietary interdictions" (食禁; shíjìn), some based on calendrical notions (no water chestnuts in the 7th month), others on purported interactions between foods (no clear wine with horse meat) or between different flavors.

Sun Simiao's disciple Meng Shen (孟诜; 孟詵; 621–713) compiled the first work entirely devoted to the therapeutic value of food: the Materia Dietetica (食疗本草; 食療本草; Shíliáo běncǎo; 'food therapy materia medica'). This work has not survived, but it was quoted in later texts – like the 10th-century Japanese text Ishinpō – and a fragment of it has been found among the Dunhuang manuscripts. Surviving excerpts show that Meng gave less importance to dietary prohibitions than Sun, and that he provided information on how to prepare foodstuffs rather than just describe their properties. The works of Sun Simiao and Meng Shen established the genre of materia dietetica and shaped its development in the following centuries.

== Later history ==
An abundant literature developed in China around the medicinal uses of food. A mid-ninth-century work, now lost, called Candid Views of a Nutritionist-Physician (simplified Chinese: 食医心鉴; traditional Chinese: 食醫心鑑) discussed how food could treat various disorders, while several works from the Song dynasty (960–1279) explained how to feed the elderly to extend their life.

In the early 14th century, Hu Sihui, who served as Grand Dietician (饮膳太医; 飲膳太醫; yǐnshàn tàiyī) at the court of the Mongol Yuan dynasty (1260–1368), compiled a treatise called Yinshan zhengyao, or Proper and Essential Things for the Emperor's Food and Drink (饮膳正要; yǐnshàn zhèngyào), which is still recognized in China as a classic of both materia medica and materia dietetica. Influenced by the culinary and medical traditions of the Turko-Islamic world and integrating Mongol food stuffs like mutton into its recipes, Hu's treatise interpreted the effects of food according to the scheme of correspondences between the five phases that had recently been systematized by northern Chinese medical writers of the Jin dynasty (1115–1234) and Yuan eras. Before that period, food materials had not yet been comprehensively assigned to the five flavors systematically correlated with specific internal organs and therapeutic effects.

Chinese understandings of the therapeutic effects of food were influential in East Asia. Cited in Japanese works as early as the 10th century, Chinese dietary works shaped Korean literature on food well into the Joseon period (1392–1897). In the late 17th and early 18th centuries, the imperial court of the Qing dynasty (1644–1912) ordered several works on Chinese food therapy translated into Manchu.

The concept entered Japan in 1972 as ishokudōgen. By the late 1990s, the 藥膳 (yakuzen) diet evolved into a simplified version where herbs are added to relatively balanced meals.

== Main tenets ==
Although the precepts of Chinese food therapy are neither systematic nor identical in all times and places, some basic concepts can be isolated. One central tenet is that "medicine and food share a common origin", and that food materials can therefore be used to prevent or treat medical disorders. Like medicinal drugs, food items are classified as "heating" (热; 熱; rè) or "cooling" (凉; 涼; liáng). In popular understanding, "heating" food is typically "high-calorie, subjected to high heat in cooking, spicy or bitter, or 'hot' in color (red, orange)", and includes red meat, innards, baked and deep-fried goods, and alcohol. They are to be avoided in the summer and can be used to treat "cold" illnesses like excessive pallor, watery feces, fatigue, chills, and low body temperature caused by a number of possible causes, including anemia. Green vegetables are the most typical "cooling" or "cold" food, which is "low-calorie, watery, soothing or sour in taste, or 'cool' in color (whitish, green)". They are recommended for "hot" conditions: rashes, dryness or redness of skin, heartburns, and other "symptoms similar to those of a burn", but also sore throat, swollen gums, and constipation.

In more systematic understandings, each medicine or food item has one of five flavors: sour, sweet, bitter, pungent (or "acrid"), and salty. Besides describing the taste of food, each of these "flavors" purportedly has specific effects on particular viscera. The sour flavor, for instance, has "constriction and emollient effects" and "can emolliate the liver and control diarrhea and perspiration", whereas "bitter" food can "purge the heart 'fire', reduce excessive fluids, induce diarrhea, and reinforce the heart 'Yin'".

One common saying among proponents of Chinese food therapy is "medicine and food, same origin" (Chinese: 药食同源; pinyin: yàoshí tóngyuán; Japanese: 医食同源 (ishokudōgen)), where certain food items are given medicinal properties, and where certain herbal medicines are deemed acceptable in food. China has approved a number of ingredients for food use under this framework (see novel food § China).

== Scientific assessments ==
Historically, there have been few studies in English literature about the practice of Chinese food therapy.

== Other examples ==
- Qiu Li Gao is a pear syrup or paste used to treat lung ailments.

== Regulations ==
The Chinese government has approved a number of herbs as food ingredients using the "Traditionally Both Food and Chinese Medicinal Materials" (按照传统既是食物又是中药材) lists. These are colloquially known as the Yàoshí Tóngyuán Catalog (药食同源目录) in Chinese. In addition, farm-grown ginseng and Cordyceps militaris, two herbs known from TCM, are considered novel food ingredients.

== See also ==
- Bencao Gangmu, a materia medica compiled by Li Shizhen during the Ming dynasty.
- Ch'ang Ming, a series of dietary and lifestyle recommendations adapted to Western eating habits
- Macrobiotic diet
- Taoist diet
- Yangsheng, a method of "nourishing life"
