= Yinshu =

Ancient Chinese text from the Han dynasty

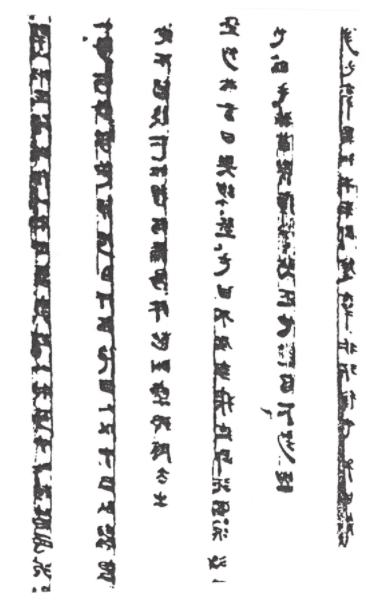
- Bamboo slips of the Yinshu.
- Original title: 引書
- Translator: Vivienne Lo
- Language: Classical Chinese
- Publication date: c. 2nd century BC
- Publication place: China

Yinshu
- Traditional Chinese: 引書
- Simplified Chinese: 引书
Transcriptions
Standard Mandarin
- Hanyu Pinyin: yǐnshū
- IPA: [ìnʂú]
Middle Chinese
- Middle Chinese: /jiɪn^{X}.ɕɨʌ/
Old Chinese
- Zhengzhang: /*linʔ.hlja/

The Yinshu (引書) (Note: Translated into English as the Book on Therapeutic Pulling, the Stretching Book, the Pulling Book, the Pulling Document, or Writings on Pulling.) is an ancient Chinese medical text from the Western Han dynasty discovered in 1983 as part of the Zhangjiashan Han bamboo texts.

== History and content ==
The Yinshu was one of the two medical texts (the other being the Maishu or the Book on Vessels) that were part of the Zhangjiashan Han bamboo texts discovered in 1983. According to translator Vivienne Lo, it dates back to around 186 BCE, during the Western Han dynasty, although Ori Tavor suggests that the text "(reflects) a textual corpus that was already circulating as early as the 3rd century BC." A transcript of the Yinshu, titled Zhangjiashan Hanjian Yinshu shiwen (張家山漢簡引書釋文), and an accompanying commentary by Peng Hao (彭浩) were published in 1990. Lo writes that it is "the earliest extant treatise on the Chinese tradition of daoyin", which she defines as "a regimen which adjusted personal hygiene, grooming, exercise, diet, sleep and sexual behaviour to the changing qualities of the four seasons."

Written in clerical script, the Yinshu is 3,235 words long and comprises some 113 bamboo slips, some of which had already been damaged prior to their excavation. The text, presented as the "way of Ancestor Peng" (彭祖之道也) discusses the causes of sickness and introduces gymnastic exercises and sexual practices that are named after either animals or the specific ailments that they are thought to target. The exercises—which Livia Kohn likens to asanas in yoga—and their benefits are summarised in twenty-four mnemonic statements.

The reason why people of low social status contract disease is due to hard manual labor, hunger, and thirst. Sweating profusely, they plunge themselves into water and proceed to lie down on the cold earth, not realizing that they should put on clothes.

— Translation by Ori Tavor.

The Yinshu concludes by surmising that unlike "noble people", members of the lower social classes were more prone to "(having) many illnesses and (dying) easily" because they were ignorant of daoyin and regulating their qi. The Yinshu echoes content found in the Huangdi Neijing, while a range of exercises listed in the former text are illustrated in the Daoyin Tu discovered at Mawangdui; Charles Buck writes that the Yinshu "clarifies" the Daoyin Tu, citing an example of the former text explaining a "leading and declining" exercise illustrated in the latter work.
