= Song Shou =

Song dynasty official (b. 991, d. 1041)

Song Shou (991- 1041) from Zhaozhou Pingji, was an official, scholar and book collector during China's Song dynasty.

== Family ==
His father, Song Gao, was an officer and his son, Song Minqiu, was a scholar of Longtu Pavilion in history and arts during the Northern Song dynasty. It was called Changshan Song family, because Zhaozhou Pingji was the local government of Changshan Commandery in Han dynasty.

== Career ==
Son Shou served as vice minister of Shumiyuan after working as assistant administrator in political affairs. In 1041, Song Shou died at age 50. Posthumously, he was entitled "Xuanxian". His writing style was exquisite and the emperor took some of his calligraphy, known as "Dynasty Style", for his personal collection. The calligraphy style is strict, and it referenced records of Zhong Yao and Zhang Zhi. Song Shou authored several books, including Collection of Song Dynasty Edicts and Khitan Customs. His five poems are recorded in the book Whole Song poetry.

== See also ==
- Changshan Commandery
