= Longtu Pavilion =

Longtu Pavilion or Longtuge (龍圖閣), also translated as Dragon Diagram Hall, was one of the palace buildings during the Song dynasty to house the Hanlin Academy. It was built between 1008 and 1016 in the Song capital of Kaifeng, originally to house official documents from Emperor Taizong of Song's reign (976–997). In 1082 it was incorporated into the Palace Library.
