= Maishu =

The Maishu (脈書), translated into English as the Book on Vessels, is an early Han dynasty medical text that discusses the vessels of the body. It was unearthed as part of the Zhangjiashan cache of texts in the 1980s. It was found with another medical text, Book on Therapeutic Pulling (Yinshu), as well as two legal texts, a maths book and a dialogue illustrating military and political issues.

The Book of Vessels was first transcribed in 1989. The contents include a discussion of the symptoms of 67 diseases.
