= Zhenjiu dacheng =

1601 collection of writings on acupuncture

The Zhenjiu dacheng (Chinese: 針灸大成; pinyin: Zhēnjiǔ dàchéng) (Note: Translated into English as Acumoxa's Great Successes, the Complete Book of Acupuncture, the Great Compendium of Acupuncture and Moxibustion or the Great Encyclopedia of Needling and Burning.) is a collection of writings on acupuncture and moxibustion. It was compiled by Ming dynasty physician Yang Jizhou (楊繼洲; 1522–1620) and first published in 1601. The Zhenjiu dacheng was reprinted at least fifty-three times before 1911, and has been described as "the greatest comprehensive survey of acupuncture in China ever to be produced during classical times."

== Contents ==
In total, the Zhenjiu dacheng consists of ten volumes which relate to a wide range of acupuncture and moxibustion-related topics, including the advanced acupuncture techniques articulated in the Song, Yuan, and Ming dynasties; methods for calculating acupoints; and the names of said acupoints. The Zhenjiu dacheng contains more than seventy illustrations, including forty images of the entire body and its acupoints, twenty images of parts of the body and their acupoints, and nine images of acupuncture tools. A selection of poems with medical themes can be found in the second volume.

A section titled Zhen xie miyao (针邪秘要), or "Secret Essentials of Needling Off Evil Influences", recommends acupuncture-based cures for mental illnesses, particularly "derangement" and "seeing demons". As part of one ritual, the acupuncturist must picture "the Yellow Emperor, Shennong, Sun Simiao and Wei Boyang standing sternly in front of him", while clandestinely uttering "after my needling let the illness not recur". After he has inserted the needle into the patient's acupoint, he must recite a couple of lengthy Taoist incantations.

== Composition and publication ==
The Zhenjiu dacheng was compiled by Ming dynasty physician Yang Jizhou (杨继洲; 1522–1620), whose grandfather was an imperial physician. Yang originally intended to only write about the medical traditions in his family that had been collected in a manuscript titled Weisheng zhenjiu xuanji miyao (衛生針灸玄機秘要), or Mysterious and Secret Essentials of Acupuncture and Moxibustion for Safeguarding Life. However, he eventually decided to discuss content covered in some twenty classics from before the Ming dynasty, such as the Huangdi neijing. Yang was likely inspired by an earlier medical writer, Gao Wu (高武), who had written two acupuncture-related treatises, the Zhenjiu sunan yaozhi (針灸素難要旨, Essentials of Acupuncture and Moxibustion) and the Zhenjiu juying (針灸聚英, Gatherings of Outstanding Acupuncturists), published in 1536 and 1546 respectively.

The finished work was edited by Jin Xian (靳賢) and first published in 1601, three years after the Bencao gangmu. It was reprinted at least fifty-three times before 1911.

== Legacy ==
According to Richard Bertschinger, the Zhenjiu dacheng is "the greatest comprehensive survey of acupuncture in China ever to be produced during classical times." Joseph Needham called it "the acme of a tradition" and "still of the highest usefulness today", while Paul U. Unschuld described it as an "extensive, impressive work".
