= Taoist diet =

Diet associated with Taoism

While there are many historical and modern schools of Taoism with different teachings on the subject, many Taoist priests regard their diet as extremely important to their physical, mental and spiritual health in one way or another, especially where the amount of qi in the food is concerned.

== Fasting ==
Some early Taoist diets called for bigu (simplified Chinese: 辟谷; traditional Chinese: 辟穀; pinyin: bìgǔ; Wade–Giles: pi-ku; lit. 'avoiding grains'), based on the belief that immortality could be achieved in this way. The ancient Taoist texts of the Taiping Jing suggest that individuals who attained the state of complete ziran would not need food at all, but instead could sustain themselves by absorbing the cosmic qi.

== Vegetarianism ==
Taoist religious orders often promote a vegetarian diet in order to minimize harm to other sentient life. Taoist levels of dietary restriction, however, are varied.

== Contemporary Taoism ==
According to Ming Yi Wang, one version of the taoist diet includes bigu, veganism, as well as refraining from eating strong-smelling plants, traditionally asafoetida, shallot, mountain leek, and Allium chinense or other alliums, which together with garlic are referred to as wǔ hūn (五葷, or 'Five Fetid and Strong-smelling Vegetables'). Additionally, nightshades are avoided.

== See also ==
- Bigu (grain avoidance)
- Ch'ang Ming
- Chinese food therapy
- Macrobiotic diet
