= Daoyin =

Series of health-promoting exercises practiced by Daoists

- Traditional Chinese: 導引
- Literal meaning: "guide and pull"
Transcriptions
Standard Mandarin
- Hanyu Pinyin: dǎoyǐn
Yue: Cantonese
- Jyutping: dou6 jan5

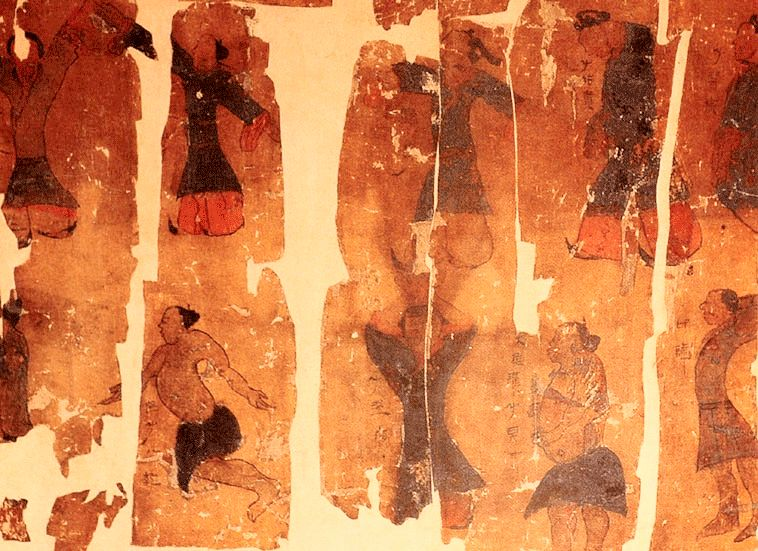
The Daoyin Tu, a painting on silk depicting the practice of daoyin; unearthed in 1973 in Hunan Province, China, from the 168 BC Western Han burial site of Mawangdui, Tomb Number 3.

Daoyin is a series of cognitive body and mind unity exercises practiced as a form of Daoist neigong, meditation and mindfulness to cultivate jing (essence) by directing Shen (Spirit/mind) and refining qi, the internal energy of the body according to traditional Chinese medicine. These exercises are often divided into yin positions (lying and sitting) and yang positions (standing and moving). The practice of daoyin was a precursor of qigong, it is practised in Chinese Taoist monasteries for health and spiritual cultivation. Daoyin is also said to be a primary formative ingredient in the yin aspects of Chinese martial arts including the well-known "soft styles" of the Chinese martial arts, of tai chi, and middle road styles like Wuxingheqidao.

The main goal of daoyin is to create flexibility, therefore unity of the body and mind, and by extension harmony between internal physiological factors and external familial, social and natural environments. Its practice is intentionally targeted to relax, replenish and rejuvenate the body, and manifesting in its practitioners, a cognitive, vital and healthy spirit.

== The Daoyin Tu ==
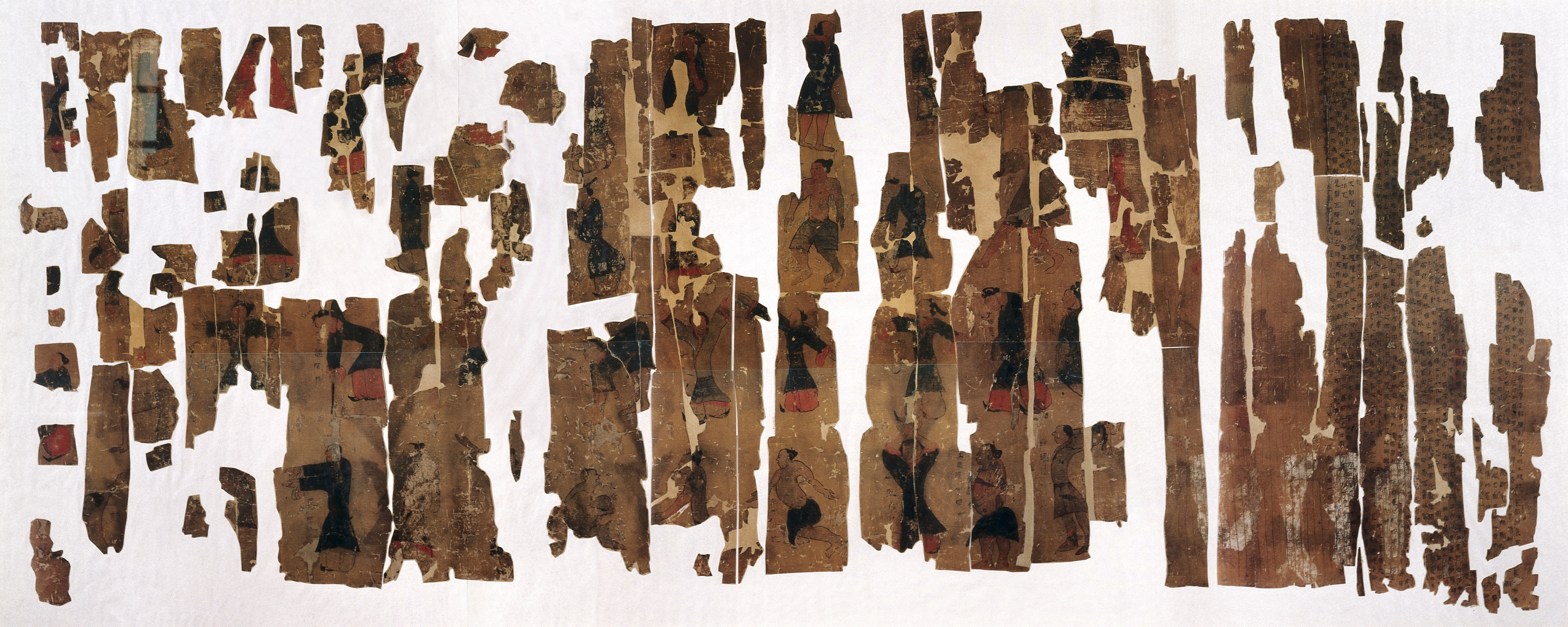
Original Daoyin Tu Drawings of Guiding and Pulling in the Mawangdui Silk Texts

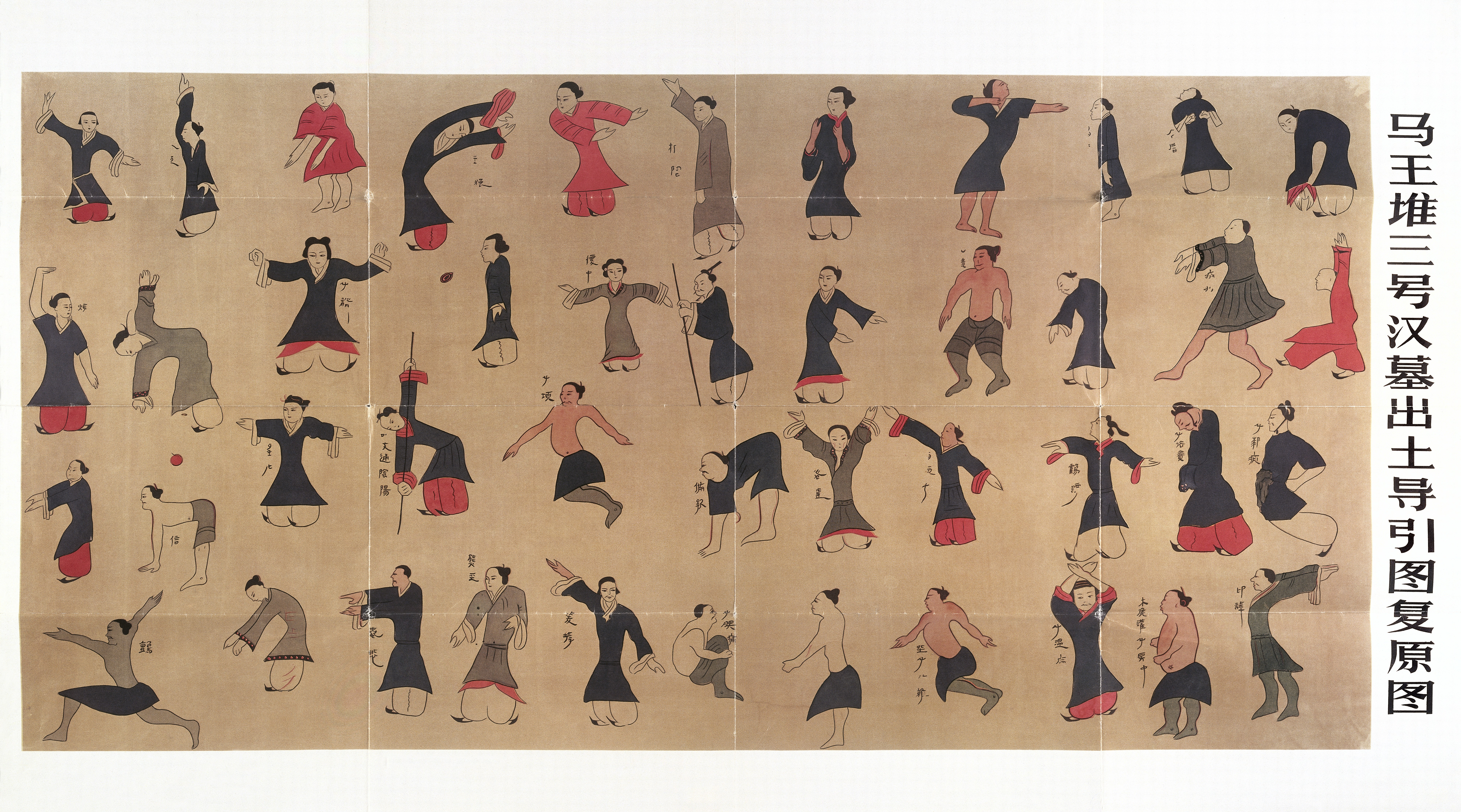
Reconstructed Daoyin tu Drawings of Guiding and Pulling in the Mawangdui Silk Texts

A painted scroll on display at the Hunan Provincial Museum and known as the Daoyin Tu found in tomb three at Mawangdui in 1973 and dated to 168 BC shows coloured drawings of 44 figures in standing and sitting postures performing daoyin exercises. It is the earliest known physical exercise chart in the world, and illustrates a medical system which does not rely on external factors such as medication, surgery or treatments, but utilizes solely internal factors to prevent disease.

The images include men and women, young and old. Their postures and movements differ from one another. Some are sitting, some are standing, and still others are practicing Daoyintu or exercising using apparatuses.

Translation of the texts covering the document show that the early Chinese were aware of the need for both preventive and corrective breathing exercises. The exercises can be divided into three categories:

1. Postures of bodily exercises such as stretching arms and legs, leaning over, hopping, dancing, breathing exercises and using various equipment such as a stick and a ball.
2. Imitating animal behaviour such as dragon, monkey, bear and crane.
3. Exercises targeted at specific injuries, illnesses and diseases.

== Effects ==
A typical daoyin exercise will involve movement of the arms and body in time with controlled inhalation and exhalation. Each exercise is designed with a different goal in mind, for example calmative effects or expanded lung capacity.

Some of the exercises act as a means of sedating, some as a stimulant or a tonification, whilst others help in the activation, harnessing and cultivation of internal Ch'i energy and the external Li life force. Through the excellent health that is gained thereby, they all assist in the opening up of the whole body, enhance the functioning of the autonomic nervous system, increase the mental capacity of the brain, give greater mind control, increase perception and intuition, uplift moral standards, and give tranquillity to the mind, which in turn confers inner harmony and greater happiness. As time goes by, these exercises slowly open up the functional and control channels that feed and activate the energy, nervous and psychic centres, enabling the individual to have a deeper understanding, consciousness and awareness of the spiritual world.

According to Mantak Chia the practice of daoyin has the following effects: harmonization of the qi, relaxation of the abdominal muscles and the diaphragm, training of the "second brain" in the lower abdomen, improvement of health and structural alignment.

The spiritual aspects of Wuxingheqidao, Daoyin practice are outlined by Chinese Buddhist's and medical practitioner Xieen as a way to unify the three centres or the mind allowing the body to relax becoming internally emotionally and spiritually stronger and outwardly softer and more flexible towards changes in the environment and everyday life.

== See also ==
- Chinese alchemy
- Dantian
- Huangdi Neijing
- Internal alchemy
- Jing
- Lee-style tai chi
- Qigong
- Silk reeling
- Taoist philosophy
- Wudang Mountains
- Yangsheng (Daoism)
- Yin Yoga
- Yinshu
- Zhang Sanfeng
