= Ishinpō =

Japanese medical text

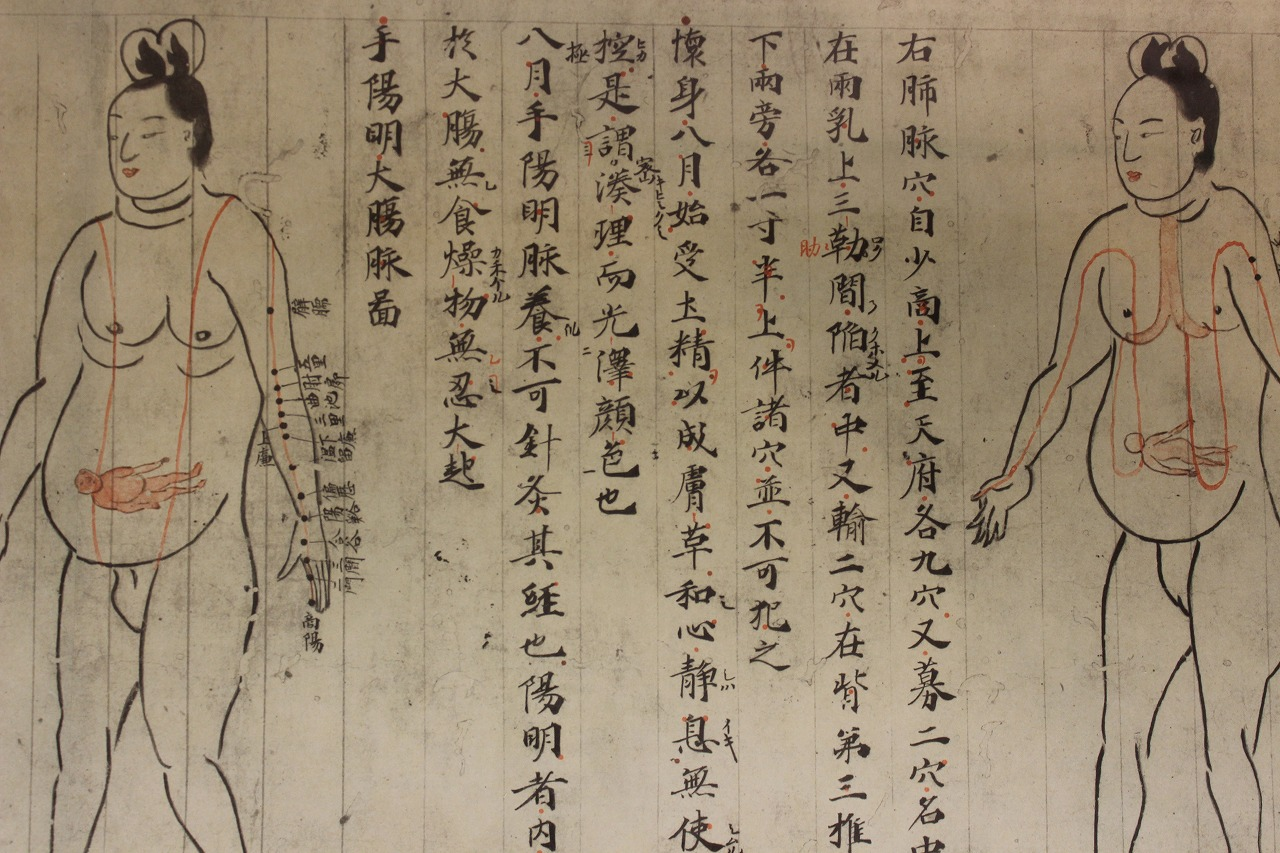
The 22nd volume of the Ishinpō, which has the only illustration in the full text.

Ishinpō (醫心方, Ishinpō or Ishinhō) is the oldest surviving Japanese medical text. It was completed in 984 by Tamba Yasuyori (also referred in some sources as Tanba no Yasuyori) and is 30 volumes in length. The work is partly based on a Chinese medical work called Zhubing yuanhou lun (諸病源候論 General Treatise on Causes and Manifestations of All Diseases), compiled by Sui dynasty writer Chao Yuanfang. Many of the texts cited in Ishinpō have been lost in China, and have only survived to the present through their inclusion in the work. It is a national treasure of Japan.

The structural organization of the text is as follows:

Volume	Subject
1	Overview
2	Acupuncture and moxibustion
3	Internal medicine
4	Dermatology
5	Otolaryngology
6	Internal medicine
7	Surgery and internal medicine
8	Internal medicine
9	Internal medicine
10	Internal medicine
11	Internal medicine
12	Internal medicine
13	Internal medicine
14	Internal medicine
15	Surgery
16	Surgery
17	Surgery
18	Surgery
19	Pharmacology
20	Pharmacology
21	Gynaecology
22	Obstetrics
23	Obstetrics
24	Obstetrics and gynaecology
25	Pediatrics
26	Health
27	Health
28	Human sexual behavior
29	Dietary health
30	Dietary health

The Ishinpō preserved more than 200 important medical documents that were all Chinese in origin and no Japanese sources. The medical knowledge in the tome covered clinical treatments that drew from the ancient Traditional Chinese medicine that included Taoist references to pharmacology. For instance, there was the inclusion of a Chinese Buddhist Sutra from the Dàzàngjīng ( Chinese Buddhist Canon) on Pregnancy, which outlined the physical developments and fetal movements. Scholars cite its similarity with a prescription from the old Chinese medical text called Taichan shu, which contained doctrines about the development of embryo and fetus as well as proper hygiene for pregnant women.

The Ishinpō is also notable for preserving some of the Taoist sexual manuals from the Han to the Tang dynasty. The twenty-eighth section of the Ishinpō contains a complete transcription of a Daoist text known as Sunü Jing (The Classic of Sunu) which is a dialogue between the Dark Maiden and the Yellow Emperor, with the former providing advice on sexual practices to the latter.

While the text is written in kanbun, Japanese terms are written to the side in Man'yōgana for plants, animals, and minerals.

A facsimile reproduction of the 1859 edition, 30 volumes in 2 hardback cases, plus a 270-page modern commentary, was issued in Tokyo in 1973.
