= Wenwu Chubanshe =

Chinese publishing house

Wenwu Chubanshe (Chinese: 文物出版社; pinyin: Wénwù Chūbǎnshè), officially known in English as the Cultural Relics Press or Cultural Relics Publishing House, is a prominent Chinese publisher. Its specialty is archaeology and books on Chinese culture. The publishing house was established in 1957 and is headquartered in Beijing.

The publisher has issued almost all significant publications on archaeological discoveries from the second half of the 20th century, the so-called "Golden Age of Chinese Archaeology": including the fossils of the Nanjing Man, the Hemudu site, Yaoshan (Liangzhu culture), the Fu Hao tomb at the Yin site (near Anyang), the Terracotta Army of Emperor Qin Shi Huang, the Han Tomb No. 1 at Mawangdui in Changsha, the two tombs from the Southern Tang period (Nan Tang er ling 南唐二陵), the Northern Caves of Mogaoku, the silk texts from the Han tomb at Mawangdui, previously unknown documents from Turfan, bamboo manuscripts from the Han tomb at Yinqueshan, bamboo manuscripts from the Qin tomb at Shuihudi, bamboo texts from the Chu tomb of Guodian, Wu manuscripts from Changsha Zoumalou, textual finds from Houma (Houma mengshu 侯馬盟書) and Wuwei (Wuwei Handai yijian 武威汉代医简), among many others.

Since its beginnings it has published about 7000 kinds of books on culture and archaeology.
