= Li Xueqin (historian) =

Chinese historian, archaeologist, and palaeographer (1933–2019)

- 李学勤
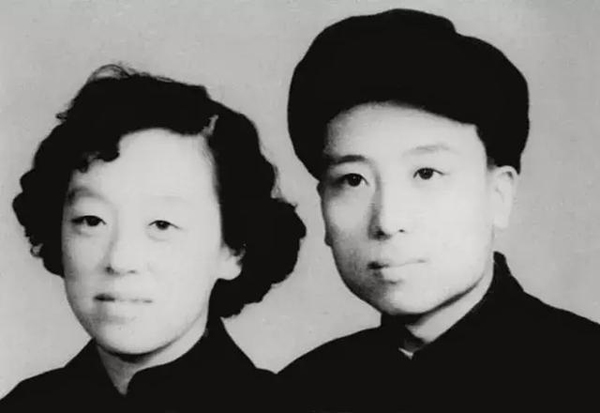
- Born: 28 March 1933; Beijing
- Died: 24 February 2019 (aged 85); Beijing
- Education: Tsinghua University
- Scientific career
- Fields: Ancient Chinese history, archaeology, and palaeography
- Workplaces: Chinese Academy of Social Sciences, Tsinghua University
- Academic advisors: Chen Mengjia

Chinese name
- Simplified Chinese: 李学勤
- Traditional Chinese: 李學勤
Transcriptions
Standard Mandarin
- Hanyu Pinyin: Lǐ Xuéqín
- Wade–Giles: Li Hsüeh-ch'in

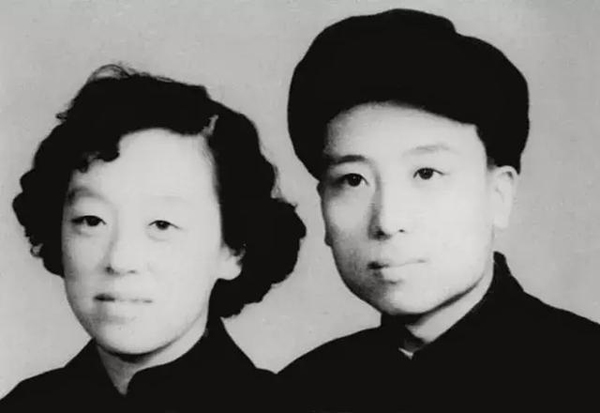
Li Xueqin and Xu Weiying

Li Xueqin (Chinese: 李学勤; Wade–Giles: Li Hsüeh-ch'in, 28 March 1933 – 24 February 2019) was a Chinese historian, archaeologist, and palaeographer. He served as Director of the Institute of History of the Chinese Academy of Social Sciences, Professor of the Institute of Sinology of Tsinghua University, Chairman of the Pre-Qin History Association of China, and led the Xia–Shang–Zhou Chronology Project.

== Early life and education ==
Li was born 28 March 1933 in Beijing. After finishing middle school in 1948, he tested number one in the entrance examination of the electrical engineering department of the National Beiping High School of Industry. However, he was unable to attend the school because a medical examination misdiagnosed him with tuberculosis. After graduating from high school, he was admitted to Tsinghua University in 1951, where he studied philosophy and logic under professor Jin Yuelin.

At Tsinghua, Li's main hobby was studying the oracle bones in the library, putting together pieces of oracle bones like puzzles. At the same time, scholar Guo Ruoyu (郭若愚) was writing a book on the oracle bones. Chen Mengjia, the oracle bones expert, thought the book needed more work, and recommended Li to assist Guo in his work. Li was thus "borrowed" by the Institute of Archaeology of the Chinese Academy of Sciences to become a research assistant to Guo and Chen.

In 1952, the Communist government reorganized Chinese universities in the Soviet model. As part of the reorganization, Tsinghua became a specialized engineering college, and its schools of humanities, science, and law were merged into Peking University (PKU). Instead of moving to PKU with the philosophy department, Li chose to stay with the Institute of Archaeology, and never finished college.

== Career ==
In 1954, Li moved to the Institute of History of the Chinese Academy of Sciences (later of the Chinese Academy of Social Sciences). In the 1950s, he systematically collated Shang dynasty oracle bones excavated from Yinxu, studied the events and historical geography from the oracle scripts, and identified oracle bones from the Western Zhou period. In the late 1950s, he studied the bronze inscriptions, pottery inscriptions, seals, coins, bamboo and wooden slips, and silk texts from the Warring States period, facilitating the formation of a new branch of Chinese paleography.

After the major disruptions of the Cultural Revolution (1966–76), Li participated in the research of the major archaeological discoveries of Mawangdui, Shuihudi, and Zhangjiashan, making important contributions to the understanding of ancient cultural history of the Warring States and the Qin and Han dynasties.

From 1985 to 1988, Li served as vice director of the Institute of History of the Chinese Academy of Social Sciences, later becoming director. Beginning in 1996, he served as chief scientist and director of the government-commissioned Xia–Shang–Zhou Chronology Project. In August 2003, Li returned to his alma mater Tsinghua University as a professor. After 2008, he focused his research on the newly recovered Tsinghua Bamboo Slips.

== Evaluation ==
Li was considered an important Chinese historian. According to the American writer and journalist Peter Hessler, Li was able to do research while satisfying the Communist Party. He wrote many books, several of which have been translated into English, including Eastern Zhou and Qin Civilizations (translated by Kwang-chih Chang), The Wonder of Chinese Bronzes, Chinese Bronzes: a General Introduction, and The Glorious Traditions of Chinese Bronzes.

In 1993, Li made a speech in which he called for historians to "leave the 'Doubting Antiquity' period" and join the "Believing Antiquity" movement, in contrast to the Doubting Antiquity School that had been highly influential since the 1920s. Scholars of this viewpoint argue that archaeological discoveries of recent decades have generally substantiated Chinese traditional accounts rather than contradicted them. Li himself favoured a third historiographical approach, which he termed "Interpreting Antiquity."

== Controversies ==
Li was involved in several controversies, including writing a smear piece on his own mentor Chen Mengjia. Later, Li deeply regretted slandering Chen and said he tried to restrain himself from writing too harshly.

=== Chen Mengjia ===
When the Anti-Rightist Campaign began in 1957, the eminent scholar Chen Mengjia was labeled a Rightist and an enemy of the Communist Party for his outspoken opposition to the simplification of Chinese characters. Li, then a research assistant to Chen, published a review that criticized Chen's scholarship and attacked him as "arrogant" and having "an extreme tendency to boast". In 1966, at the beginning of the Cultural Revolution, Chen was again severely persecuted for his ideas.

In the 2000s, American journalist Peter Hessler interviewed Li and surprised him with questions about Chen Mengjia. In response, Li expressed deep regret of his actions as a young man. He said that he was pressured by the Institute of Archaeology to write the review and that he kept the criticism to the minimum and took care to only criticize Chen's scholarship and avoided applying more damaging political labels such as "Rightist".

== Death ==
Li died in Beijing on 24 February 2019, at the age of 85.
