= Tsinghua Bamboo Slips =

Collection of ancient Chinese texts

The Tsinghua Bamboo Strips (simplified Chinese: 清华简; traditional Chinese: 清華簡; pinyin: Qīnghuá jiǎn) are a collection of Chinese texts dating to the Warring States period and written in ink on strips of bamboo, that were acquired in 2008 by Tsinghua University, China. The texts were obtained by illegal excavation, probably of a tomb in the area of Hubei or Hunan province, and were then acquired and donated to the university by an alumnus. The very large size of the collection and the significance of the texts for scholarship make it one of the most important discoveries of early Chinese texts to date.

On 7 January 2014 the journal Nature announced that a portion of the Tsinghua Bamboo Strips represent "the world's oldest example" of a decimal multiplication table.

== Discovery, conservation and publication ==
The Tsinghua Bamboo Strips (TBS) were donated to Tsinghua University in July 2008 by an alumnus of the university. The precise location(s) and date(s) of the illicit excavation that yielded the strips remain(s) unknown. An article in the Guangming Daily named the donor as Zhao Weiguo (赵伟国), and stated that the texts were purchased at "a foreign auction", Neither the name of the auction house, nor the location or sum involved in the transaction was mentioned. Li Xueqin, the director of the conservation and research project, has stated that the wishes of the alumnus to maintain his identity secret will be respected.

Similarities with previous discoveries, such as the manuscripts from the Guodian tomb, indicate that the TBS came from a mid-to-late Warring States Period (480–221BC) tomb in the region of China culturally dominated at that time by the Chu state. A single radiocarbon date (305±30BC) and the style of ornament on the accompanying box are in keeping with this conclusion. By the time they reached the university, the strips were badly affected by mold. Conservation work on the strips was carried out, and a Center for Excavated Texts Research and Preservation (出土文献研究与保护中心) was established at Tsinghua on April 25, 2009. There are 2388 strips altogether in the collection, including a number of fragments.

A series of articles discussing the TBS, intended for an educated but non-specialist Chinese audience, appeared in the Guangming Daily during late 2008 and 2009. The first volume of texts (photographic reproductions, transcriptions, and commentary) was published by the Tsinghua team in 2010, with the series scheduled to have a total of 18 volumes. A series of studies and publications are appearing in the series The Tsinghua University Warring States Bamboo Manuscripts: Studies and Translations《清華大學藏戰國竹簡》研究与英译, edited by Huang Dekuang (黃德寬) and Edward Shaughnessy.

== The texts ==
The Tsinghua manuscripts vary greatly in content. The collection caught attention because several of the TBS texts have connections to the received Shang Shu (尚書; "Exalted Writings"), a collection of texts dated to various periods from the first millennium BC to the 3rd century CE. Because of the important role the Shang Shu plays in Chinese culture, the discovery of Warring States manuscripts that bear on its formation attracted interest. For example, the Yin zhi (尹至) manuscript from volume one has a partial overlap with the Tang shi (湯誓) text in the Shang shu; volume 9 of the series includes a manuscript whose content largely overlaps the Jin Teng (金滕) text in the Shang shu, and accordingly the editors titled the manuscript *Jin teng. Several others "writings-style" manuscripts present in the excavated collection are not found in the received Exalted Writings, either never having been incorporated into the canonical text, or having been lost or removed in the process of transmission.

Other content resembles that of annalistic histories (編年體史書), recording events from the beginning of the Western Zhou (mid-11th century BC) through to the early Warring States period (mid-5th century) is said to be similar in form and content to the received Bamboo Annals.

Another text running across 14 strips recounts a celebratory gathering of the Zhou elite in the 8th year of the reign of King Wu of Zhou, prior to their conquest of the Shang dynasty. The gathering takes place in the ancestral temple of King Wen of Zhou, King Wu's father, and consisted of beer drinking and the recitation of hymns in the style of the received Shi Jing.

== Texts by volume ==
=== Volume one ===
The following texts were published in volume one: *Yin zhi 尹至 ("*Yin's arrival"); *Yin gao (尹誥; "*Yin's Announcement"); Cheng wu (程寤); *Baoxun (保訓; "*The Protective Instructions"); *Qi ye (耆夜); *Jin teng (金縢); *Huangmen (皇門; "*August gate"); Zhai Gong zhi gu ming (祭公之顧命; "The Duke of Zhai's Retrospective Command"); and Chu ju.

- *Yin zhi (尹至; "*Yin's arrival") and *Yin gao (尹誥; "*Yin's Announcement") were written by the same scribe, and were considered two texts in the "writings" style.
- *Baoxun (保訓; "*The Protective Instructions"). The text purports to be a record of a deathbed admonition by the Zhou king Wen Wang to his son and heir, Wu Wang. Although the team working on the text refers to it as "The Admonition of Protection" (or "Protector's Admonition", 保训), their transcription of the text refers to a "Precious Admonition" (Bao Xun) and that may be the more appropriate editorial title. The content of the king's speech revolves around a concept of The Middle (中; zhong) which seems to refer to an avoidance of extremes and an ability to consider multiple points of view. The king narrates a story of the sage-king Shun acquiring The Middle by living a modest, thoughtful life, and a more puzzling second tale which describes the Shang ancestor Wei (微) "borrowing The Middle from the River." A complete translation and study has been published as part of the series The Tsinghua University Warring States Bamboo Manuscripts: Studies and Translations《清華大學藏戰國竹簡》研究与英译.

=== Volume two ===
It includes one text only, the Xinian, probably composed c. 370 BCE. This text relates key events of Zhou history. It comprises 138 strips in a relatively well preserved condition. Among the contents they transmit is an account of the origin of Qin by supporters of the Shang dynasty, who were opposed to the Zhou conquest.

=== Volume three ===
It includes the Fu Yue zhi ming (傅說之命; "Command to Fu Yue"); the *Liang chen (良臣), and the Zhu ci (祝辭), among others.

=== Volume seven ===
It includes Zi Fan Zi Yu (子犯子餘), Jin Wen Gong ru yu Jin (晉文公入於晉), Zhao jianzi (趙簡子), and Yue Gong qi shi (越公其事).

- Zi fan Zi Yu (子犯子餘) records a dialogue between Zi Fan and Duke Mu of Qin. This takes place while Chong'er is in exile, traveling from state to state.
- Jin Wen gong ru yu Jin (晉文公入於晉) narrates the story of the Duke Wen of Jin (posthumous name of the aforementioned Chong'er) returning to his state after years of battle, and putting it in order.

=== Volume eight ===
It includes eight texts: *She ming (攝命), *Bang jia zhi zheng (邦家之政), *Bang jia chu wei (邦家處位); *Xin shi wei zhong (心是謂中); *Tianxia zhi dao (天下之道); Ba qi wu wei wu si wu xing zhi shu (八氣五味五祀五行之屬), and Yu Xia Yin Shang zhi zhi (虞夏殷商之治).

- *She ming (攝命; "*Command to She.") Titled by the editors. 32 strips. It purports to be a royal command to a certain She. It is written in shu (書) style. The editors identified it as the "original" Shangshu chapter Jiong Ming (囧命).
- Xin shi wei zhong (心是謂中; "*The heart is what is at the center"), a short (8 strips) text of philosophical nature discussing the heart-mind (xin 心) as the central organ in charge of the body, but also the concept of "luck" and mandate (命; ming). It includes the statement that humans are in charge of their destiny, so far otherwise unattested.

=== Volume nine ===
Volume nine, published in 2019, presents five manuscripts:

- *Zhi zheng zhi dao (治政之道). This manuscript is of 43 strips, around 44 cm long by 0.6. Based on the incision cuts on the verso of the strips and the similarities in the writing, the editors realized that this manuscript was originally bound together with *Bang jia zhi zheng (邦家之政) from volume eight, and the two should be read together. Given that the manuscripts still present codicological differences, Jia Lianxian 賈連翔 identified them as an example of tong pian yi zhi (同篇異制; "one bundle with different configurations").
- Cheng ren (成人)
- *Nai ming (迺命一二; "*Then he commanded (one and two)"). These are two manuscripts written by the same person, as noted by the editors. The first is of 12 strips; the strips are numbered from 1 to 11, with the last one being left blank after the conclusion of the text (signaled by a hook-shape mark). Similarly, the second manuscripts is of 16 strips, numbered from one to 15. These two texts record commands given by an unnamed person to a group of officials (in the first one), and to a group of males who are presumably serving the person who is speaking.
- Dao ci (禱辭)

=== Volume twelve ===
Volume twelve presents strip images, transcription and study of one manuscript, titled by the editors San Bu Wei (参不韋), the name of the person who talks in the manuscript. The manuscript is of 124 strips wavering 32.8 cm in length; they are numbered on the verso side in well-preserved conditions. The content is otherwise unattested. In the text, San Bu Wei admonishes Qi 啟 (founder of the Xia dynasty) on how to govern, revise punishments, and conduct rituals.

=== Volume thirteen ===
The volume contains 5 manuscripts:

- Daifu Shi Li (大夫食禮).
- Daifu Shi Li Ji (大夫食禮記).
- Wu yin tu (五音圖). One of the most striking features of this (and the following manuscript) is the size: the 35 extant strips (from 37, originally) of Wu Yin tu average around 19.3 cm, a length that is half of most of the manuscripts in the Tsinghua collection. The writing develops around the 5 edges of a star, which figures at the center. It has attracted a great deal of attention for being one of the few writings related to music that predate imperial times.
- Yue feng (樂風).
- Wei tian yong shen (畏天用身). The text is reproduced in full in a paper by Shi Xiaoli 石小力. The manuscript is of 17 strips, measuring 44.4 cm by 0.6 cm. The title was assigned by the editors, based on the two initial principles introduced by the manuscript: "being in awe of Heaven" (畏天) and "using one's abilities" (用身). The text articulates behavioral principles (pay attention to surroundings; speaking properly) and how even and the self/person differ. Shi Xiaoli notes several echoes with ideas known in the Xunzi 荀子.

A first introduction to the manuscripts on music can be found in Jia Lianxian's 贾连翔 2023 article in Zhongguo shi yanjiu dongtai (中國史研究動態).

=== Volume fourteenth ===
Volume no. 14 presents three manuscripts:

- Cheng Hou (成后), a manuscript of 9 strips, some mildly damaged, and numbered on the verso side. The text is otherwise unattested. The title was assigned by the editor, on the basis of the content. Cheng Hou is identified as King Cheng of Zhou 周成王, who in the text reminiscences about the accomplishments of past kings, and goes on to describe his governing philosophies.
- Zhao Hou (昭后), which was originally bound together with Cheng Hou. This is another short manuscript, of 7 strips, also numbered on the back. The writing style also matches that of the scribe of Cheng Hou. The title, assigned by the editor, is likewise based on its content: King Zhao of Zhou 周昭王 is on the throne and, in a form of an address to an unnamed interlocutor, defines proper government. Both this and Cheng Hou are rhymed and are styled in four-character sentences. The language is reminiscent of styles used in bronze inscriptions and in some speeches collected in the Shangshu 尚書.
- A manuscript of 88 strips, 1 of which is lost, titled by the editors Liang Zhou 兩中. This is a dialogue between Qi 启, the second ruler of the legendary Xia dynasty, and two spirit-like figures, Gui Zhong 圭中 and Xiang Zhong 詳中. It begins by setting up the establishment of the dynasty, after which the dialogue ensues. The text can be divided into six units: strips 1 to 18, 19 to 29, 30 to 42, 43 to 63, 64 to 69, and 67 to 88.

=== Volume fifteenth ===
According to the introduction by Huang Dekuan, volume 15 contain the following manuscripts:

- *Judging Horses 《*胥马》 65 strips about judging horses based on their physical appearances.While this text is otherwise unattested, the content has connections with other early Chinese writings on the subject.
- *On Horse Illnesses, 《*凡马之疾》 of 24 strips (one lost, 23 extant), about illnesses and their treatment.
- *On Training Horses, 《*驯马》 12 strips about on training horses to step, gallop, etc.
- Two manuscripts concerning riding horses. One is titled *Riding Horses 《*驭术》, of 37 strips, but overall rather damaged. The text includes descriptions of horses' emotions, and the best methods to control them. The second has been titled *The Way of Riding Horses 《*驭马之道》 12 strips, both on riding horses. *The Way of Riding Horses takes horse riding as a metaphor to discuss proper government, taking a legalist approach to it.

== Decimal multiplication table ==
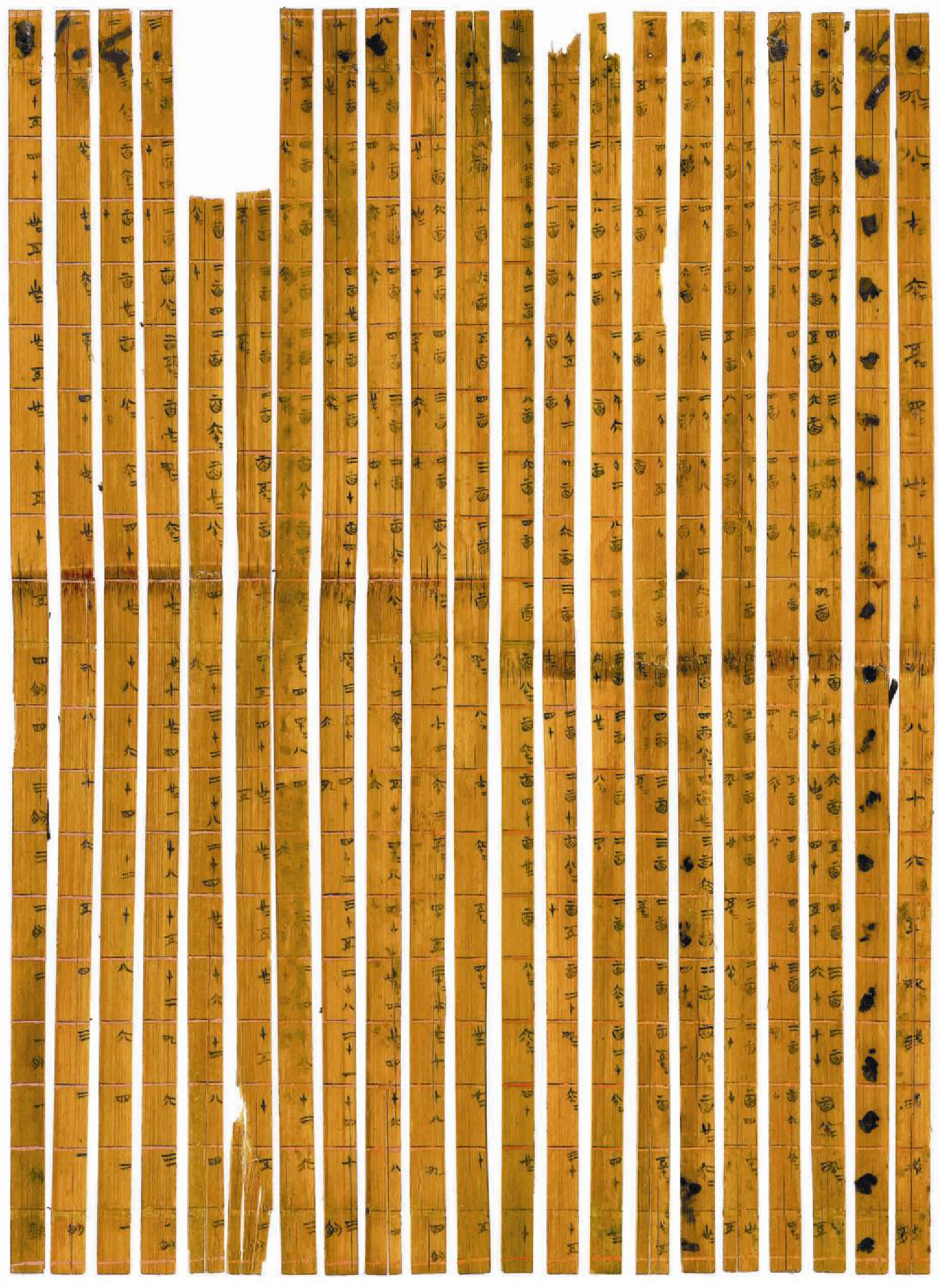
The world's earliest artifacts of decimal multiplication table

Twenty-one bamboo strips of the Tsinghua Bamboo Strips, when assembled in the correct order, represent a decimal multiplication table that can be used to multiply numbers (any whole or half integer) up to 99.5.

Joseph Dauben of the City University of New York called it "the earliest artefact of a decimal multiplication table in the world". According to Guo Shuchun, director of the Chinese Society of the History of Mathematics, those strips filled a historical gap for mathematical documents prior to the Qin dynasty. "It helps establish the place-value system, a crucial development in the history of math", as Professor Wen Xing of Dartmouth College explains. It is presumed that officials used the multiplication table to calculate land surface area, yields of crops and the amounts of taxes owed.

A diagram of the Warring States-era decimal multiplication table showing the calculation of 12 × 34.5

== See also ==
- Guodian Chu Strips
- Shuanggudui
- Yinqueshan Han Strips
- Zhangjiashan Han bamboo texts
