= Anthony Barbieri =

Anthony Barbieri may refer to:

- Tony Barbieri (born 1963), American comedic writer and performer
- Anthony Jerome Barbieri, American sinologist and historian
