= Mawangdui Silk Texts =

2nd-century BC corpus of Chinese manuscripts

The Mawangdui Silk Texts (traditional Chinese: 馬王堆帛書; simplified Chinese: 马王堆帛书; pinyin: Mǎwángduī Bóshū) are Chinese philosophical and medical works written on silk which were discovered at the Mawangdui site in Changsha, Hunan, in 1973. Their twenty-eight silk books of around 120,000 words cover military strategy, mathematics, cartography, and the six classical arts: ritual, music, archery, horsemanship, writing, and arithmetic. They include some of the earliest attested manuscripts of existing texts (such as the I Ching), two copies of the Tao Te Ching, a copy of Zhan Guo Ce, works by Gan De and Shi Shen, and previously unknown medical texts such as Wushi'er Bingfang (Prescriptions for Fifty-Two Ailments) and Moxibustion Classic of Eleven Foot-Hand Meridians.

== Overview ==
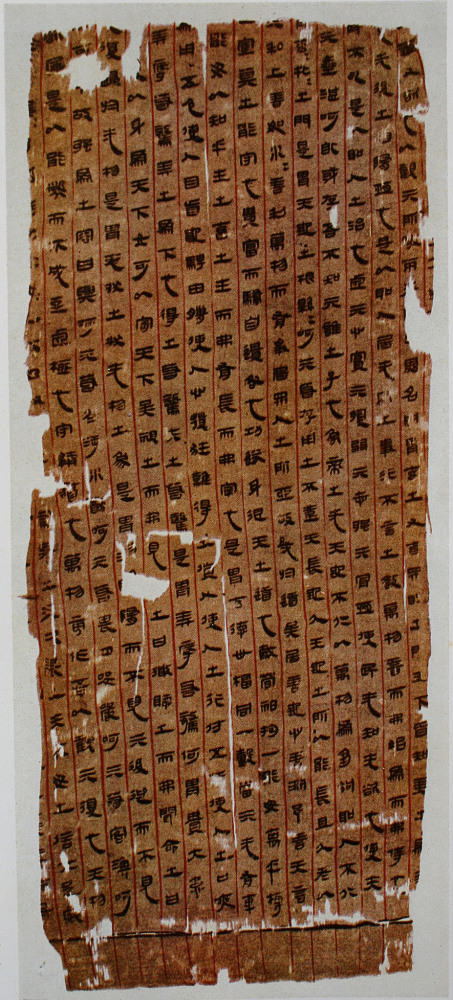
Part of a silk manuscript from Mawangdui, second century BC

The texts were buried in tomb number three at Mawangdui (which was sealed in 168 BC), and were hidden until their late-20th-century discovery. Some were previously known only by title, and others are previously unknown commentaries on the I Ching. In general, they follow the same sequence as the received versions, which were passed down by copying and recopying texts collected and collated during the fifth century AD. However, in some important aspects they differ noticeably from the received texts known before their discovery.

=== Tao Te Ching ===
Most received versions of the Tao Te Ching are in substantial agreement. Occasionally two versions will have a homonym, and a third text with a character which is a synonym for one of the first two characters is useful.

There are two Mawangdui Laozi texts, namely A (甲; written in earlier small seal script) and B (乙; written in later clerical script). Texts A and B were copied at different times, with A being the earlier text, although both may be derived from the same parent text. Both Mawangdui texts place the de section (chapters 38–81) before the dao section (chapters 1–37), whereas the received text places the dao section first.

D. C. Lau and Robert G. Henricks have made new translations of the Tao Te Ching based on the silk text, largely ignoring the received texts, although Henricks' translation compares received versions with the text found in the tomb. In 1990, sinologist Victor H. Mair translated the Mawangdui version; Mair considered this earliest-known version (by 500 years) more authentic than the most commonly translated texts. The two silk books are part of the Cultural Relics from the Mawangdui Tombs collection at the Hunan Provincial Museum.

=== Jargon ===
The Chinese characters in the silk texts are often only fragments of the characters used in later traditional versions. Many characters are formed by combining two simpler characters: one indicating a general category of meaning, and the other to guide pronunciation. Where the traditional texts have both components, the silk texts frequently give only the phonetic half of the character. There are several hypotheses to explain this:

- The scribe may have been too lazy to write the full form of many characters.
- The earlier of two silk texts (or the text from which it was copied) may have been a scribe taking dictation as quickly as they could write. The scribe wrote down the part of each character that indicates its pronunciation, with the intention of later recopying the text with the appropriate meaning components for the abbreviated characters.
- In English, "dog" has two apparently-unrelated meanings: a carnivorous mammal, or to pursue with unflagging patience. English speakers do not write "dog (the mammal)", even in the sentence "The feral dog dogged the human invaders of its territory until they eventually left the area". A similar understanding may have been assumed in the ancient writings.
- It may have been a form of jargon; similar writing of partial characters are found in ancient Chinese musical (pipa, guqin and guzheng) scores. Partial characters and their derivatives are building blocks for the writing systems of some historical (such as Khitan and Tangut) and modern languages, such as Japanese.

In addition to partial characters mentioned above, the two-silk texts sometimes use characters different from those in later versions. This is similar to the English "She flowered the table" compared with "She floured the table", and the older version provides insight into a text's original meaning.

== Translations ==
- Heluo Tushu Chubanshe (1975). Boshu Laozi. Taipei: Heluo Tushu Chubanshe.
- Yen Ling-feng (1976). Mawangdui Boshu Laozi Shitan. Taipei.
- D. C. Lau (1982). Tao te ching. Hong Kong: The Chinese University Press. ISBN 962-201-252-3.
- Robert G. Henricks (1989). Lao-tzu : Te-tao ching. New York: Ballantine Books. ISBN 0-345-34790-0.
- Victor H. Mair (1990). Tao Te Ching : The Classic Book of Integrity and the Way. New York, Toronto, London, Sydney, Auckland: Bantam Books. ISBN 0-553-07005-3.
- Edward L. Shaughnessy (1997). I Ching = The classic of changes, the first English translation of the newly discovered Mawangdui texts of I Ching. New York: Ballantine Books. ISBN 0-345-36243-8.
- Harper, Donald (1998). Early Chinese Medical Literature : The Mawangdui Medical Manuscripts. London: Kegan Paul International. ISBN 0710305826.

== See also ==
- Book of Silk
- Chu Silk Manuscript
- Guodian Chu Slips
- Mawangdui
- Shuanggudui
- Shuihudi Qin bamboo texts
- Yinqueshan Han Slips
- Zhangjiashan Han bamboo texts
