= Anthony Jerome Barbieri =

Academic author and historian

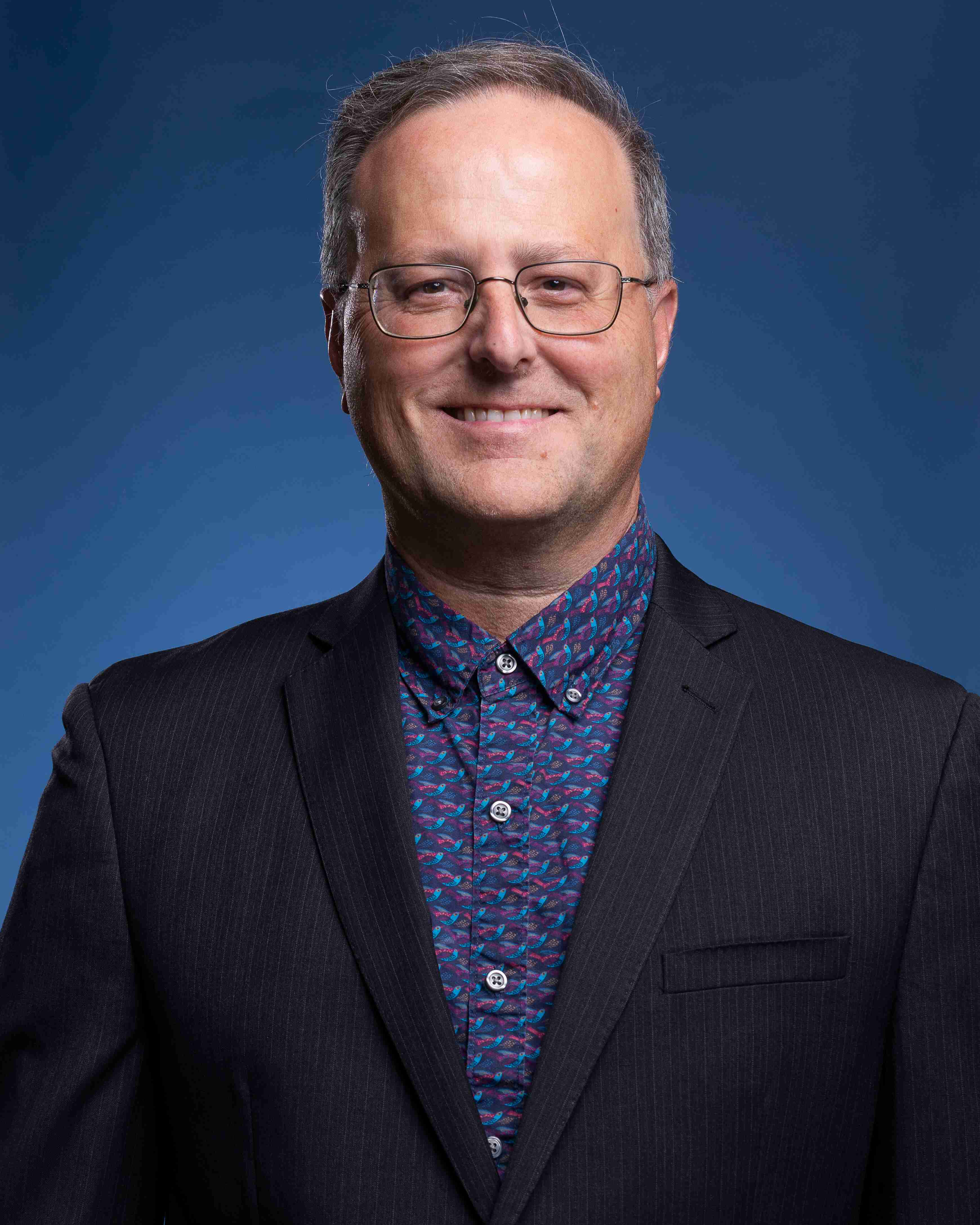
- Occupations: Historian, author, and academic

Academic background
- Education: University of California, Santa Cruz (BA); Harvard University (MA); Princeton University (PhD)

Academic work
- Discipline: Sinology
- Institutions: University of California, Santa Barbara

Anthony Jerome Barbieri (nom-de-plume: Anthony J. Barbieri-Low; Chinese name: Li Andun 李安敦) is an American sinologist and historian. He is a professor at the University of California, Santa Barbara.

Barbieri's research has focused on world history, the history of China, and on Egyptology. His publications comprise 8 books, including Recarving China's Past, Law, State, and Society in Early Imperial China, and Artisans in Early Imperial China, which was named an Outstanding Academic Title by Choice in 2009, and has received awards from the American Historical Association, the College Art Association, and the Association for Asian Studies. He has been granted fellowships from the American Council of Learned Societies, the Mellon Foundation, and the National Endowment for the Humanities.

== Education ==
Barbieri earned his B.A. in history in 1994 from the University of California, Santa Cruz. He then obtained an M.A. in 1997 from Harvard University and his Ph.D. in Chinese art and archaeology from Princeton University in 2001.

== Career ==
Barbieri began his career as an assistant professor of Early Chinese History at the University of Pittsburgh in 2001. He was promoted to an associate professor in 2006. In 2007, he joined the University of California, Santa Barbara as an assistant professor, was appointed an associate professor in 2009 and has been a professor since 2015.

Barbieri has contributed to digital humanities projects, in which he created computer models of sites such as Mycenae and the Banpo Neolithic Village, as well as artifacts from Sanxingdui and Jinsha Sites. He developed a virtual tour of the Wu Family Shrine cemetery site, which was exhibited at the Princeton University Art Museum in 2005.

== Works ==
Barbieri's work centers on ancient history, particularly the early history of China, with comparative publications focusing on Egyptology. He co-authored the book Recarving China's Past: Art, Archaeology, and Architecture of the Wu Family Shrines, which explored the Wu family shrines. Craig Bunch, in his review of the book remarked that "What might at first appear a daunting amount of material on a matter of secondary importance is in fact a fascinating and clearly-written look at the history of the 'Wu Family Shrines'". Writing for The New York Times, Holland Cotter described it as "an assiduous, tradition-baiting" study.

In 2007, Barbieri published Artisans in Early Imperial China, an art-historical study of the lives of artisans in the Qin and Han dynasties, exploring how they lived and sustained themselves. The book received the Charles Rufus Morey Book Award from the College Art Association along with the American Historical Association's James Henry Breasted Prize and the Joseph Levenson Book Prize from the Association for Asian Studies. Tim Kindseth, writing for Time Magazine, called Barbieri a "sapient guide" through Ancient China. Anne Underhill remarked that this book "tackles an important topic that has not been adequately addressed by historians, art historians, or archaeologists", while Susan Erikson critiqued its usage of post-Han texts since Han evidence was limited.

In collaboration with Robin D.S. Yates, Barbieri co-authored Law, State, and Society in Early Imperial China: A Study with Critical Edition and Translation of the Legal Texts from Zhangjiashan Tomb No. 247. Daniel Sungbin Sou called it "a door to understanding everyday life in the early Han dynasty". In a review for the Journal of the Royal Asiatic Society, Paul R. Goldin referred to the volume as a 'fundamental and lasting contribution to the field." Maxim Korolkov added that it "reflects the current consensus on the composition and organization of the Zhangjiashan legal texts." His 2021 publication, Ancient Egypt and Early China: State, Society, and Culture, examined the major similarities between the ancient civilizations of China and Egypt. Danijela Stefanović highlighted that it "presents the first in-depth comparative approach to ancient Egypt and early China", whereas Armin Selbitschka critiqued the book's "propensity to gloss over" differing perspectives.

Barbieri's work has also examined figures in Chinese history. His book The Many Lives of the First Emperor of China analyzed representations of the First Emperor of the Qin dynasty in legends, literature, and popular culture. Elizabeth Laurence commented that the book is "evidence that historical 'meta-analysis' can produce a book as absorbing as a good narrative history". However, she did mention how it would have been a success without its constituent parts. Maxime Ferbus, in a review for the French language academic journal Arts Asiatiques, reported that while some of the book's illustrations deserved more analysis: "nevertheless, through the originality of its sources, this study brilliantly reveals the richness of an imagination whose depth and richness ultimately surpassed those of its subject matter."

In 2025, he authored Parallel Journeys: Eurasian History Through Travelers' Eyes (400 BCE-1936 CE), a comparative anthology of Eastern and Western travel accounts that traced shifts in perspectives across Eurasia over 2400 years.

== Awards and honors ==
- 2004 - Fellowship, National Endowment for the Humanities
- 2007 – Fellowship, National Endowment for the Humanities
- 2008 – James Henry Breasted Prize, American Historical Association
- 2009 – Charles Rufus Morey Book Award, College Art Association
- 2009 – Joseph Levenson Book Prize, Association for Asian Studies
- 2009 – Outstanding Academic Title, Choice
- 2013 – New Directions Fellowship, Mellon Foundation
- 2018 – Patrick Hanan Book Prize (Honorable Mention), Association for Asian Studies
- 2019 – Fellowship, American Council of Learned Societies
- 2023 – Fellowship, National Endowment for the Humanities

== Selected books ==
- Liu, Cary Y.; Nylan, Michael; Barbieri-Low, Anthony Jerome (2005). Recarving China's Past: Art, Archaeology And Architecture Of The 'Wu Family Shrines'. Princeton Univ. Art Museum / Yale University Press. ISBN 9780300107975.
- Barbieri-Low, Anthony Jerome (2007). Artisans In Early Imperial China. University of Washington Press. ISBN 9780295749884.
- Barbieri-Low, Anthony Jerome; Yates, Robin D. S. (2015). Law, State, And Society In Early Imperial China: A Study with Critical Edition and Translation of the Legal Texts from Zhangjiashan Tomb No. 247. Brill. ISBN 9789004300538.
- Barbieri-Low, Anthony Jerome (2021). Ancient Egypt and Early China: State, Society, and Culture. University of Washington Press. ISBN 9780295748900.
- Barbieri-Low, Anthony Jerome (2022). The Many Lives of the First Emperor of China. University of Washington Press. ISBN 9780295750231.
- Barbieri-Low, Anthony Jerome (2025). Parallel Journeys: Eurasian History Through Travelers' Eyes (400 BCE-1936 CE). Cambria Press. ISBN 9781638573807.
