= Shuanggudui =

Archeological site located near Fuyang in China

- 双古堆 (Japanese)
- Location within China
- 32.9°N 115.8°E
- Type: tombs
- Periods: Han dynasty
- Location: Anhui, China

History
- Event: Sealed 165 BCE

Shuanggudui (simplified Chinese: 双古堆; traditional Chinese: 雙古堆; pinyin: Shuānggǔduī) is an archeological site located near Fuyang in China's Anhui province. Shuanggudui grave no. 1, which belongs to Xiahou Zao (夏侯灶), the second marquis of Ruyin (汝陰侯), was sealed in 165 BCE in the early Han dynasty (206 BCE – 220 CE). Excavated in 1977, it was found to contain a large number of texts written on bamboo strips, including fragments of the Classic of Poetry and the Songs of the South, a text on breathing exercises, a "year table" (年表) recounting historical events, a manual on dogs, a version of the I Ching (Yijing) that differs from the received one, and artifacts including the oldest known cosmic board, a divinatory instrument. Like Mawangdui and Guodian, two other tombs from the area of the old state of Chu, the Shuanggudui find has shed great light on the culture and practices of the early Han dynasty.

== Excavation and identification ==
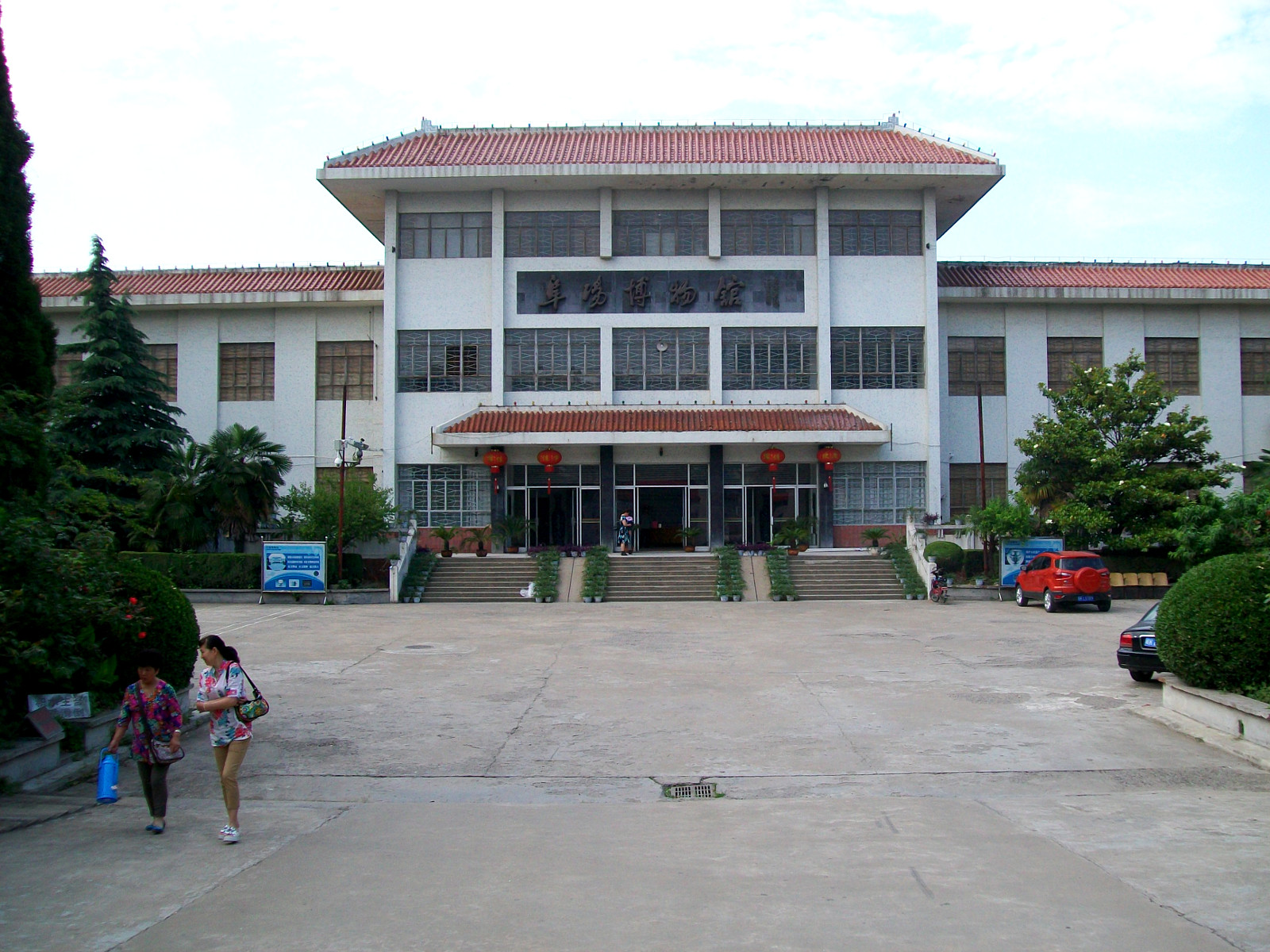
Fuyang city museum

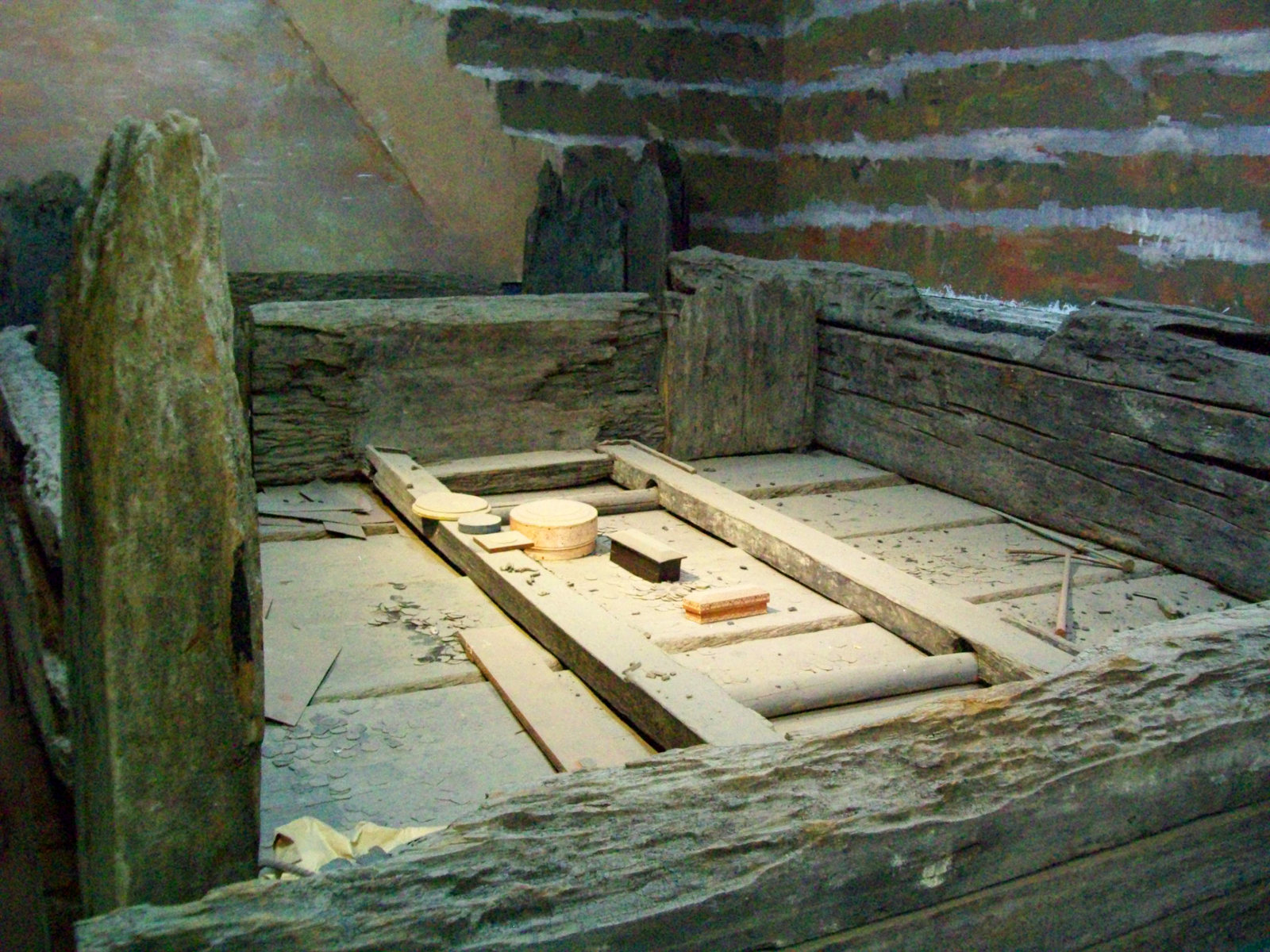
Tomb of Xiahou Zao (front), now located in Fuyang's local museum

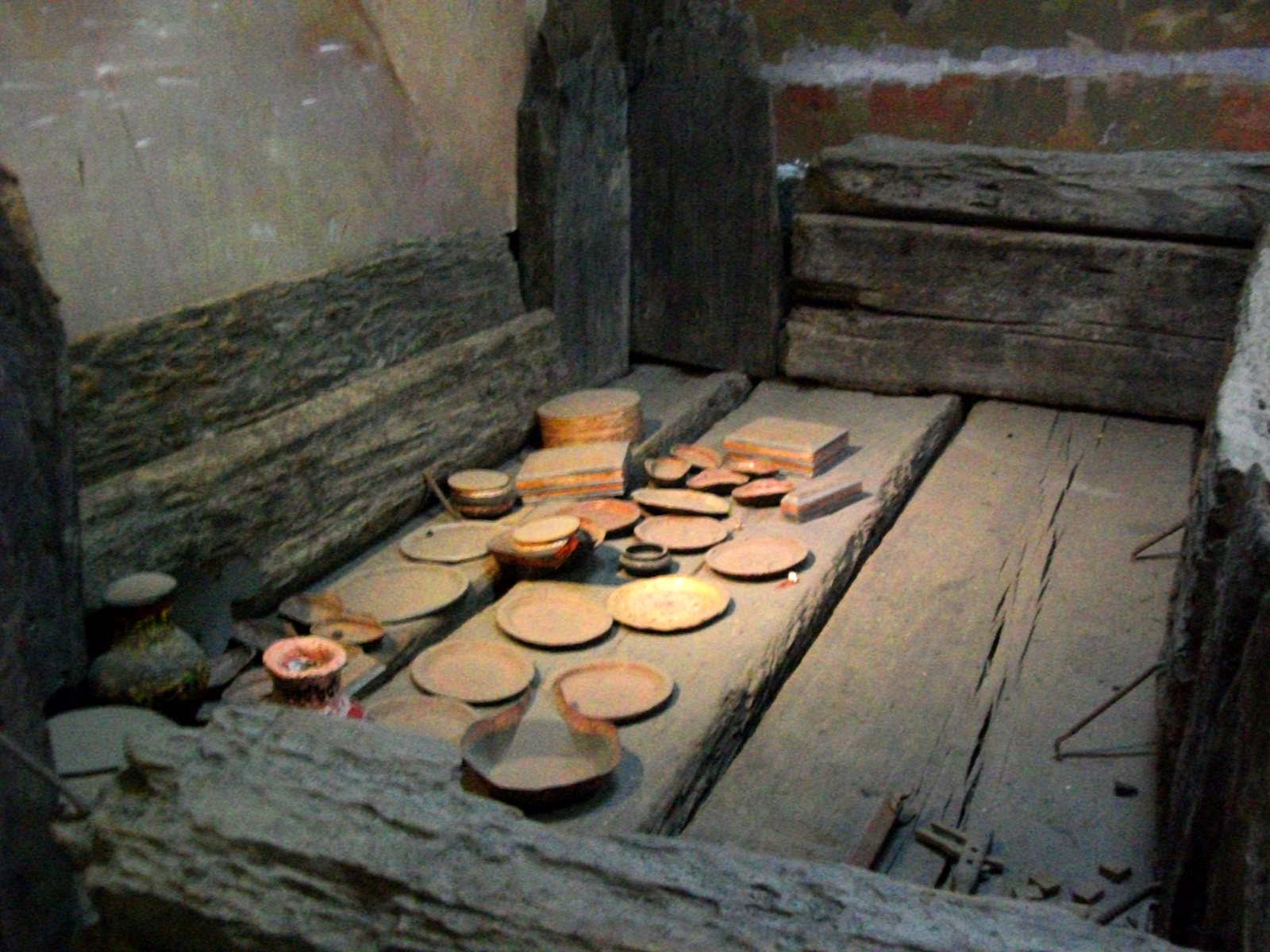
Tomb of Xiahou Zao (rear). The site of Xiahou Zao's tomb became known as Shuanggudui

Shuanggudui (双古堆; 'paired ancient tumuli') was excavated in July 1977 during the expansion of the Fuyang municipal airport in Anhui province, China. Located about two miles outside Fuyang at the time, the site was known to contain old tombs, yet it is unclear whether the excavation was pre-planned or rushed just as construction started. The digging was supervised by two archeologists from the Anhui Provincial Archaeological Relics Find Team, who discovered two tombs, one of which (Tomb 1, to the east) was found to contain texts and artifacts. A ramp 4.1 metres (13 ft) wide led to a coffin chamber measuring 9.2 metres (30 ft) north-south by 7.65 metres (25.1 ft) east-west, about half the area of the more famous Tomb 3 that had been discovered in Mawangdui in 1973.

Some of the bronze artifacts found in Tomb 1 were marked with the name of the tomb's occupant Ruyin Hou (女［汝］陰侯), which means "Lord of Ruyin". This title had first been granted to Xiahou Ying (d. 172 BCE), who had helped Liu Bang (r. 202–195 BCE) to establish the Han dynasty. Archeologists have identified the tomb as belonging to Ying's son Xiahou Zao, the second Lord of Ruyin. Little is known about him, except that he died seven years after his father. The tomb is therefore thought to have been sealed in 165 BCE, the fifteenth year of Emperor Wen's reign.

== Artifacts ==
=== Cosmic boards ===
The Shuanggudui tomb contained the earliest known diviner's boards (式; shi), or "cosmographs", divinatory instruments that were widely used during the Han dynasty (206 BCE – 220 AD). These two lacquered astrological boards consist of a movable disk – 9.5 centimetres (3.7 in) in diameter – representing the Heavens mounted on a square base – 13.5 by 13.5 centimetres (5.3 by 5.3 in) – representing Earth. The center of the circular top depicts the seven stars of the Northern Dipper (which was considered to be a powerful astral deity), whereas the rim of both the disk and the square base is inscribed with astro-calendrical signs that helped to perform divination. Donald Harper, who wrote about this artifact soon after its discovery, argued that it should be called a "cosmic board" because it is "so obviously a mechanistic model of the cosmos itself".

The use of such boards is described or alluded to in many ancient Chinese texts like the Chu Ci, Han Feizi, Huainanzi, and some military texts. The diviner would rotate the disk until the Dipper pointed in a chosen direction, usually corresponding to the current date. He would then find an answer to his question by means of numerological calculations. Manipulation of this miniature model of the cosmos was supposed to bring power to its user.

Numeral juxtaposition on the inner, round part of the board correlates to the Luoshu layout, which was long supposed to have been invented in the Six Dynasties (220–589). This is the most ancient occurrence of the Luoshu magic square. "The inscriptions ... appear to belong to ... the 'Circulation of Taiyi among the Nine Palaces.'" (太一行九宮; Taiyi xing jiugong)

=== Other objects ===
The most valuable goods that were buried with Xiahou Zao had long been robbed when archeologists excavated the tomb in 1977. In addition to the two cosmic boards, many lacquered vessels were found, as well as terra cotta musical instruments, metallic weapons (a few made of iron but most of bronze), and a number of bronze artifacts like a mirror, a lamp, and a cauldron.

== Texts ==
=== Bamboo strips ===
Robbers who looted the tomb in the late second century CE took the bamboo strips out of the lacquered bamboo hamper in which they had been placed and left the strips on the ground of the coffin chamber. The chamber itself later collapsed, breaking the strips, and muddy water covered the strips, eventually turning them into "paper-thin sheets, fused together into clumps by ground pressure." The largest of the three clumps was about 25 centimetres (9.8 in) long by 10 centimetres (3.9 in) wide and 10 centimetres (3.9 in) high. To complicate matters, the 1977 excavation took place under a heavy rainstorm, and the pump that the excavators used to remove mud from the coffin chamber also pumped out other fragments of bamboo strips.

It took a team led by Han Ziqiang (韩自强) of the Fuyang Local Museum and Yu Haoliang (于豪亮; 1917–1982) of the Bureau of Cultural Relics in Beijing almost two years just to separate the surviving fragments. They first removed mud from the clumps by soaking them in a "weak vinegar solution", then baked them to remove moisture. Next, they detached the thin and extremely brittle fragments of strips from the clumps one by one and photographed each piece. Historian Edward Shaughnessy, who has worked on some of the Shuanggudui texts, finds it "miraculous" that they could be reconstructed from such damaged material.

After Yu Haoliang's death in 1982, Hu Pingsheng (胡平生) replaced him at the head of the team. It is Hu and Han Ziqiang who edited the texts for publication.

=== Classic of Changes ===
The longest text found in Shuanggudui is an incomplete version of the Yijing, or Classic of Changes, in 752 fragments containing 3,119 characters. The hexagram and line statements of the Shuanggudui text closely resemble the received version, yet it is too fragmentary to reconstruct the complete text of any single hexagram or even the sequence in which they were presented.

Nearly two thirds of this Shuanggudui Yijing consist in "formulaic divination statements" that are present neither in the received Yijing, nor in the version that was found in Mawangdui that was also sealed in the 160s BCE. Edward Shaughnessy has hypothesized that the line statements of the received Book of Changes may have originated in similar but older divination statements.

=== Classic of Poetry ===
More than 170 fragments of the Classic of Poetry or Book of Odes, for a total of 820 characters, have also been found in Shuanggudui. These fragments are longer and have been more extensively studied than other incomplete versions of the Shijing found in ancient tombs like those of Guodian (tomb sealed around 300 BCE) and Mawangdui (168 BCE).

The Shuanggudui version contains portions of 65 songs from the "Airs of States" (國風; Guofeng) section and 4 from the Xiaoya (小雅) section. Although the song titles are the same as those of the received version, the text varies substantially from that of the other early Han versions. Since each strip contained one stanza (章; zhang), characters were written smaller when a long stanza had to fit on a single strip.

=== Cangjiepian ===
Named after the mythical inventor of Chinese writing, the Cangjiepian or Cang Jie Wordbook was one of the earliest primers of Chinese characters. It was first compiled by Li Si (ca. 280–208 BCE) – an important statesman of the Qin dynasty who wanted to use it to support his policies of language unification – and later augmented with two other works. The Shuanggudui version counts 541 characters, a little less than 20 percent of the complete work. It is longer and more legible than the fragments of the same work that were found in Juyan 居延 (at the confines of Inner Mongolia and Gansu), and among the Dunhuang manuscripts. Its presence in several early Han tombs shows that the Cang Jie Pian "was, if not a common manual for elementary instruction, at least not a rare work."

=== Wanwu ===
The text that Chinese editors have titled "Myriad Things" or "Ten Thousand Things" (萬物; Wanwu) is an extensive list of natural substances that historians of Chinese medicine see as a precursor of later Chinese herbology, or literature on materia medica like the Shennong bencao jing. It explains how to use some substances for healing purposes, but also contains technical information on how to catch animals or expel vermin. In the words of historian Donald Harper, this work "catalogues human curiosity about the products of nature," noting among other things that pinellia can fatten pigs and that "a horse-gullet tube can be used to breathe under water." The names of drugs and illnesses found in Wanwu correspond with those found in the Recipes for Fifty-Two Ailments, a text dating from about 200 BCE that was buried in a tomb in Mawangdui in 168 BCE. These and other correspondences between the two texts show that the same knowledge of drugs was circulating in both the southern Chu region (Mawangdui) and the Yangzi River valley (Shuanggudui).

=== Historical annals ===
The most fragmentary and badly damaged of the texts found in Shuanggudui is a text that the Chinese editors have called "Table" (表; biao), an annalistic compilation of events from about 850 to the end of the third century BCE, that is, from the late Western Zhou through the Spring and Autumn period and the Warring States. Some of the strips still carry the horizontal markers that divided the text into rows. The existence of this chronological "Table" in the early second century BCE shows that Sima Qian did not invent this mode of historical representation, as he often gave the impression in his magnum opus the Shiji.

=== Breathing exercises ===
An incomplete text dealing with breathing exercises was also excavated in Shuanggudui. Modern editors have named it xingqi (行氣), or Moving the Vapors. Along with similar texts found in Mawangdui, Zhangjiashan, and Shuihudi, it testifies to the widespread existence of gymnastic practices in Han times.

=== Manual on dogs ===
The tomb also contained a Classic for Physiognomizing Dogs (相狗經; Xiang Gou Jing), "a text for assessing the qualities of dogs." It has been compared to another text on dogs from Yinqueshan (tomb sealed in the second half of the second century BCE) and to a work on the physiognomy of horses that was excavated from a grave in Mawangdui (sealed in 168 BCE).

=== Other fragments ===
Fragments of the following texts were also found in the tomb:

- Eight bamboo strips bearing 56 characters from the "Miscellaneous Chapters" (雜篇; Zapian) of the Zhuangzi.
- A handbook for government officials that the modern editors have named Zuowu Yuancheng (作務員程), or Per Capita Rate for Work Duties. This manual gives the "standard rates of work for different tasks to be carried out by farmers and artisans".
- Almanacs (日書; rishu or "day books") and other divinatory texts similar to those that were found in other graves such as Yinqueshan.
- Ninety-six strips bearing a text resembling the Chunqiu Shiyu (春秋事語; "Stories and Sayings of the Spring and Autumn") excavated in Mawangdui.
- Three "wooden boards" (牘; du) each bearing the table of contents of one book. One is the Chunqiu Shiyu (see previous entry), and the most complete one is called Rujiazhe Yan (儒家者言; "Sayings of the Ru School"), close in content to the Kongzi Jiayu (孔子家語; "School Sayings of Confucius"), which has been transmitted to the present.

== See also ==
- Chu Silk Manuscript
- Fangmatan
- Guodian Chu Slips
- Mawangdui Silk Texts
- Shuihudi Qin bamboo texts
- Tsinghua Slips
- Yinqueshan Han Slips
- Zhangjiashan Han bamboo texts

== Bibliography ==
=== Works cited ===
- Dorofeeva-Lichtmann, Vera (2004), "Spatial Organization of Ancient Chinese Texts (Preliminary Remarks)", in Chemla, Karine (ed.), History of Science, History of Text, Dordrecht: Springer, pp. 3–49, ISBN 1-4020-2320-0.
- ——— (2007), "Mapless Mapping: Did the Maps of the Shan hai jing Ever Exist?", in Francesca Bray; Vera Dorofeeva-Lichtmann; Georges Métailié (eds.), Graphics and Text in the Production of Technical Knowledge in China: The Warp and the Weft, Leiden and Boston: E.J. Brill, pp. 217–94, ISBN 978-90-04-16063-7.
- Graziani, Romain (2009), "The subject and the sovereign: exploring the self in early Chinese self-cultivation", in John Lagerwey; Mark Kalinowski (eds.), Early Chinese Religion. Part One: Shang through Han (1250 BC–220 AD), Leiden: Brill, pp. 459–518, ISBN 978-90-04-16835-0.
- Greatrex, Roger (1994), "An Early Western Han Synonymicon: The Fuyang Copy of the Cang Jie pian", in Joakim Enwall (ed.), Outstretched Leaves on His Bamboo Staff: Essays in Honour of Göran Malmqvist on his 70th Birthday, Stockholm: Association of Oriental Studies, pp. 97–113, ISBN 91-970854-3-X.
- Harper, Donald (1978–1979), "The Han Cosmic Board (shih 式)", Early China, 4: 1–10, doi:10.1017/S0362502800005836, JSTOR 23351383. (subscription required)
- ——— (1998), Early Chinese Medical Literature: The Mawangdui Medical Manuscripts, London and New York: Kegan Paul International, ISBN 0-7103-0582-6.
- ——— (1999), "Warring States Natural Philosophy and Occult Thought", in Michael Loewe; Edward L. Shaughnessy (eds.), The Cambridge History of Ancient China: From the Origins of Civilization to 221 B.C., Cambridge: Cambridge University Press, pp. 813–84, ISBN 0-521-47030-7.
- Hayhoe, Ruth (1992), Education and Modernization: The Chinese Experience, Oxford and New York: Pergamon Press, ISBN 0-08-037411-5.
- Hsu, Elisabeth (2010), Pulse Diagnosis in Early Chinese Medicine: The Telling Touch, Cambridge: Cambridge University Press, ISBN 978-0-521-51662-4.
- Hu, Pingsheng 胡平生 (1989), "Some Notes on the Organization of the Han Dynasty Bamboo 'Annals' Found at Fuyang", Early China, 14, translated by Deborah Porter: 1–25, doi:10.1017/S0362502800002571, JSTOR 23351410. (subscription required)
- Kalinowski, Marc (2013), "The Notion of "Shi" 式 and Some Related Terms in Qin-Han Calendrical Astrology", Early China, 35: 331–360, doi:10.1017/S0362502800000535.
- Kern, Martin (2005), "The Odes in Excavated Manuscripts", in Martin Kern (ed.), Text and Ritual in Early China, Seattle: University of Washington Press, pp. 149–93, ISBN 978-0-295-98787-3.
- Lewis, Mark Edward (2006), The Construction of Space in Early China, Albany, NY: SUNY Press, ISBN 0-7914-6608-6.
- Sabban, Françoise (2000), "Quand la forme transcende l'objet. Histoire des pâtes alimentaires en Chine (IIIe siècle av. J.-C.–IIIe siècle apr. J.-C.)" [When the form transcends the thing: history of pasta in China, 3rd century BC – 3rd century AD], Annales. Histoire, Sciences Sociales, 55 (4): 791–824, doi:10.3406/ahess.2000.279881.
- Shaughnessy, Edward L. (2001), "The Fuyang Zhou Yi and the Making of a Divination Manual" (PDF), Asia Major, Third Series, 14 (1): 7–18.
- ——— (2014), Unearthing the Changes: Recently Discovered Manuscripts of the Yi Jing (I Ching) and Related Texts, New York: Columbia University Press, ISBN 978-0-231-16184-8.
- Sterckx, Roel (2002), The Animal and the Daemon in Early China, Albany, NY: SUNY Press, ISBN 0-7914-5270-0.
- Tseng, Lillian Lan-ying (2011), Picturing Heaven in Early China, Cambridge (Massachusetts) and London: Harvard University Asia Center, distributed by Harvard University Press, ISBN 978-0-674-06069-2.
- Unschuld, Paul U.; Zheng, Jinsheng (2005), "Manuscripts as sources in the history of Chinese medicine (translated from German by Mitch Cohen)", in Vivienne Lo; Christopher Cullen (eds.), Medieval Chinese Medicine: The Dunhuang medical manuscripts, New York: RoutledgeCurzon, pp. 19–44, ISBN 0-415-34295-3.
- Vankeerberghen, Griet (2007), "The Tables (biao) in Sima Qian's Shi ji: Rhetoric and Remembrance", in Francesca Bray; Vera Dorofeeva-Lichtmann; Georges Métailié (eds.), Graphics and Text in the Production of Technical Knowledge in China: The Warp and the Weft, Leiden and Boston: E. J. Brill, pp. 295–311, ISBN 978-90-04-16063-7.
- Wilkinson, Endymion (2000), Chinese History: A Manual. Revised and enlarged, Cambridge (Massachusetts) and London: Harvard University Asia Center, ISBN 0-674-00247-4.

=== Further reading ===
- Fuyang Han jian zhenglizu 阜阳汉简整理组, [Organizing group for the Han-dynasty bamboo slips from Fuyang] (1983), "Fuyang Han jian Cang Jie Pian 阜阳汉简《仓颉篇》" [The Cang Jie Pian in the Han-dynasty bamboo slips from Fuyang], Wenwu 文物, 1983 (2): 24–34.
- ——— (1984), "Fuyang Han jian Shijing 阜阳汉简《诗经》" [The Classic of Poetry in the Han-dynasty bamboo slips from Fuyang], Wenwu 文物, 1984 (8): 1–12.
- ——— (1988), "Fuyang Han jian Wan Wu 阜阳汉简《万物》" [Wan Wu in the Han-dynasty bamboo slips from Fuyang], Wenwu 文物, 1988 (4): 36–54.
- Xing, Wen 邢文 (2003), "Hexagram Pictures and Early Yi Schools: Reconsidering the Book of Changes in Light of Excavated Yi Texts", Monumenta Serica: Journal of Oriental Studies, 51: 571–604, doi:10.1080/02549948.2003.11731403, JSTOR 40727382 (subscription required)
