= Tao Te Ching =

Chinese classic text

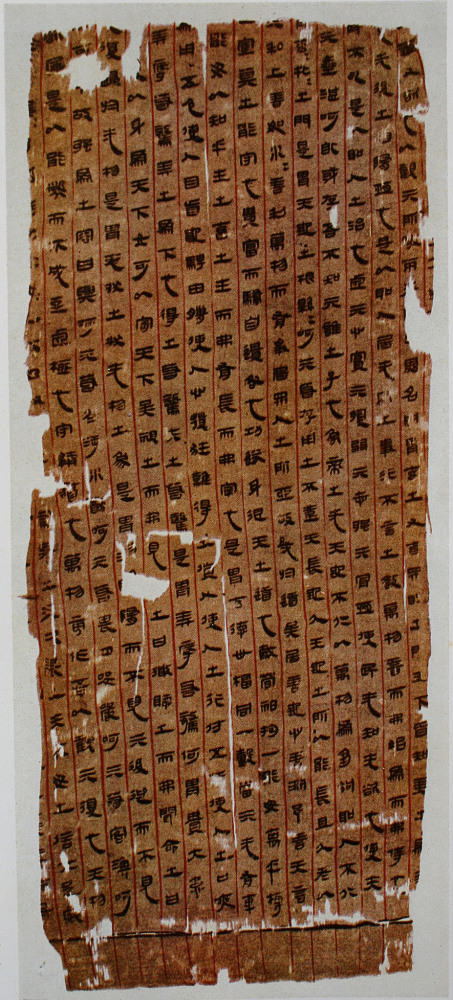
- Ink on silk manuscript of the Tao Te Ching – from Mawangdui (2nd century BCE)
- Author: Laozi (trad.)
- Language: Classical Chinese
- Subject: Philosophy
- Publication date: 4th century BCE
- Publication place: China
- English publication date: 1868
- Original text: Tao Te Ching at Chinese Wikisource
- Translation: Tao Te Ching at Wikisource

Chinese name
- Traditional Chinese: 道德經
- Simplified Chinese: 道德经
- Literal meaning: "Classic of the Way and Virtue"
Transcriptions
Standard Mandarin
- Hanyu Pinyin: Dào Dé Jing
- Bopomofo: ㄉㄠˋ ㄉㄜˊ ㄐㄧㄥ
- Wade–Giles: Tao^{4} Tê^{2} Ching^{4}
- Yale Romanization: Dàu Dé Jīng
- IPA: [tâʊ tɤ̌ tɕíŋ]
Wu
- Romanization: Dau Teh Cin
Hakka
- Romanization: Tau4 Dêd5 Gin1
Yue: Cantonese
- Yale Romanization: Douh Dāk Gīng
- Jyutping: Dou6 Dak1 Ging1
- IPA: [tɔw˨ tɐk̚˥ kɪŋ˥]
Southern Min
- Hokkien POJ: Tō Tek Keng
- Tâi-lô: Tō Tik King
Middle Chinese
- Middle Chinese: Dɑu^{X} Tək̚ Keŋ
Old Chinese
- Baxter (1992): *luʔ tɨk keng
- Baxter–Sagart (2014): *[kə.l]ˤuʔ tˤək k-lˤeŋ

Alternative Chinese name
- Chinese: 老子
- Literal meaning: "The Old Master"
Transcriptions
Standard Mandarin
- Hanyu Pinyin: Lǎozǐ
- Bopomofo: ㄌㄠˇㄗˇ
- Wade–Giles: Lao3 Tzŭ3
- Yale Romanization: Lǎudž
- IPA: [lǎʊ tsɹ̩̀]
Wu
- Suzhounese: Lau^{6}-tsy^{3}
Yue: Cantonese
- Yale Romanization: Lóuhjí
- Jyutping: Lou5zi2
- IPA: [lɔw˩˧.tsi˧˥]
Southern Min
- Hokkien POJ: Ló-chú
- Tâi-lô: Ló-tsú
Old Chinese
- Baxter–Sagart (2014): *C.rˤuʔ tsəʔ

Second alternative Chinese name
- Traditional Chinese: 道德真經
- Simplified Chinese: 道德真经
- Literal meaning: "Sutra of the Way and Its Power"
Transcriptions
Standard Mandarin
- Hanyu Pinyin: Dàodé Zhēnjīng
- Bopomofo: ㄉㄠˋ ㄉㄜˊ ㄓㄣ ㄐㄧㄥ
- Wade–Giles: Tao4> Tê2 Chên1 Ching1
- Yale Romanization: Dàudé Jēnjīng
- IPA: [tâʊ tɤ̌ ʈʂə́n tɕíŋ]
Old Chinese
- Baxter–Sagart (2014): *[kə.l]ˤuʔ tˤək ti[n] k-lˤeŋ

The Tao Te Ching or Dào Dé Jīng, (Note: Standard Chinese: [tâʊ tɤ̌ tɕíŋ]; in English often UK: /ˌtaʊ tiː ˈtʃɪŋ/ TOW tee CHING, US: /ˌdaʊ dɛ ˈdʒɪŋ/ DOW deh JING; Less common romanisations include Daodejing, Tao-te-king, Tau Tĕh King and Tao Teh King.) (traditional Chinese: 道德經; simplified Chinese: 道德经; lit. 'Classic of the Way and its Virtue') also known simply as the Laozi, is an ancient Chinese classic text traditionally attributed to the sage Laozi. It is regarded as the foundational Taoist text alongside the Zhuangzi. Central to both philosophical and religious Taoism, it has been "profoundly influential" more broadly in Chinese culture, art and medicine.

The texts' authorship and dating is debated, with several similar early versions recovered. Traceable as far back as the early to mid fourth century BCE, Alan Chan of the Stanford Encyclopedia argues that archaeology indicates that "bodies of sayings" attributed to Laozi were put into writing probably from "the second half of the fifth century B.C.E.", with different overlapping collections gradually consolidated during the fourth century BCE (400-300 BCE). Questionable as a single unified text, it's oldest excavated manuscript fragments, the Guodian Chu slips, date to around 300 BCE, the latter half of the Warring States period (475 – 221 BCE). They are taken as dating back to the fourth century BCE. A conservative estimation would date relatively complete modern versions of the text to the mid third century BCE, or late Warring States period.

Terminology originating within the text has been reinterpreted and elaborated upon by Legalist thinkers, Confucianists, and particularly through Chinese Buddhism, which arrived well after the formation and wide spread societal use of this text within Chinese culture. First translated into French in the early nineteenth century, it is one of the most translated texts in world literature.

== Biography ==
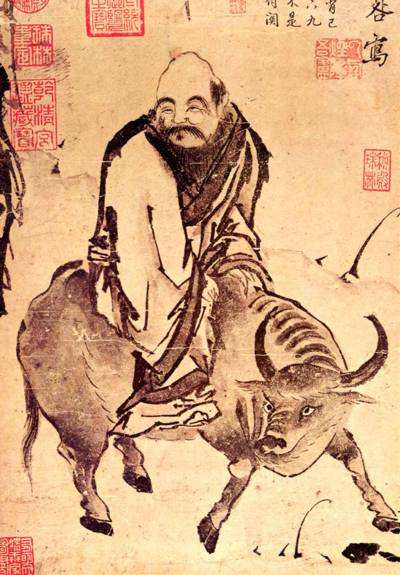
Laozi riding a water buffalo

The Tao Te Ching is traditionally ascribed to Laozi, whose historical existence has been a matter of scholarly debate. His name, which means "Old Master", has only fueled controversy on this issue. Legends claim variously that Laozi was "born old" and that he lived for 996 years, with 12 previous incarnations starting around the time of the Three Sovereigns before the 13th as Laozi. Some scholars have expressed doubts about Laozi's historicity.

The first biographical reference to Laozi is in the Records of the Grand Historian, by Han dynasty historian Sima Qian (c. 145–86 BCE), which includes three stories. Though even by late estimates, A.C. Graham believed that the idea of Lao Dan as a contemporary of Confucius existed by the late Warring States period, 250 BCE.

In the first, Laozi was a contemporary of Confucius. His surname was Li (李), and his personal name was Er (耳) or Dan (聃). He was an official in the imperial archives, and at the request of the keeper of the Han-ku Pass, Yinxi, wrote a book in two parts before departing to the West, composing the Tao Te Ching. In the second story, Laozi, also a contemporary of Confucius, was Lao Laizi (老萊子), who wrote a book in 15 parts. In the third, Laozi was the grand historian and astrologer Lao Dan (老聃), who lived during the reign of Duke Xian of Qin (r. 384–362 BCE).

Feng Youlan did not consider it a significant issue for tradition if the Tao te Ching turned out to be a later work than the traditional Laozi. He did not believe the traditional account required Laozi to personally write the book named for him, or that this would therefore void him having been a real person.

=== Sinology ===
Alan Chan (SEP) finds "little reason" to doubt the "traditional claim that Laozi was a senior contemporary of Confucius (551–479 BCE)".

Thomas Michael (2021) doubts that "anyone had ever heard" of Laozi before association with a supposed late Warring States period (250 BCE~ - Graham) Tao te Ching compilation (or at least collection) drawing on earlier sources - the old late dating theory of A.C. Graham. The Analects quote Laozi material anonymously, though anonymous quotation is a typical mode of argument earlier in the Warring States period.

The Zhuangzi prefers the name Lao Dan (Old Dan). Graham took Lao Dan as originating in Confucianism, adopted by the Inner Zhuangzi "towards 300 BCE". A Lao Dan is a consultant to Confucius in the Book of Rites, advising on royal funerals. There is no anti-Daoist rhetoric in Lao Dan's funeral instructions to suggest the Confucians invented their Lao Dan in opposition to a Daoist Lao Dan.

The Inner Zhuangzi references Lao's Dan's funeral. Graham suggested that this (funerals) is the older stratum of his theming. He is a royal archivist and contemporary of Confucius in Zhuangzi chapters 13 and 14. Even so, although not part of the Book of Rites, Graham believed he was probably already known as an archivist in the fourth century BCE.

The late Xunzi's criticisms, by the middle of the third century ("230 BCE"- Graham), are the first reference to Lao Dan as a philosopher under the title Laozi. It's Tian Lun chapter says "Laozi had insight into retreat and yielding, but no insight into firmness and trustworthiness." A Lao Dan is similarly mentioned alongside other classical figures in the late Warring States Lushi Chunqiu, taken as "valuing the soft" or "yielding."

== Archaeologically recovered manuscripts ==
Tao Te Ching scholarship has advanced from archaeological discoveries of manuscripts, some of which are older than any of the received texts. Beginning in the 1920s and 1930s, Marc Aurel Stein and others found thousands of scrolls in the Mogao Caves near Dunhuang. They included more than 50 partial and complete manuscripts. Another partial manuscript has the Xiang'er commentary, which had previously been lost.

In 1973, archaeologists discovered copies of early Chinese books, known as the Mawangdui Silk Texts, in a tomb dated to 168 BCE. They included two nearly complete copies of the text, referred to as Text A (甲) and Text B (乙), both of which reverse the traditional ordering and put the Te Ching section before the Tao Ching, which is why the Henricks translation of them is named "Te-Tao Ching". Based on calligraphic styles and imperial naming taboo avoidances, scholars believe that Text A can be dated to about the first decade and Text B to about the third decade of the 2nd century BCE.

In 1993, the oldest known version of the text, written on bamboo slips, was found in a tomb near the town of Guodian (郭店) in Jingmen, Hubei, and dated prior to 300 BCE. The Guodian Chu Slips comprise around 800 slips of bamboo with a total of over 13,000 characters, about 2,000 of which correspond with the Tao Te Ching. Both the Mawangdui and Guodian versions are generally consistent with the received texts, excepting differences in chapter sequence and graphic variants. Several recent Tao Te Ching translations utilise these two versions, sometimes with the verses reordered to synthesize the new finds.

== Principal versions ==
Among the many transmitted editions of the Tao Te Ching text, the three primary ones are named after early commentaries, "Yan Zun", "Heshang Gong" and "Wang Bi". From the early Tang dynasty onward, it was mainly transmitted with the commentaries of the Heshang Gong and Wang Bi.

- The "Yan Zun Version", which is only extant for the Te Ching (the "virtue" half of the text), derives from a commentary attributed to Han dynasty scholar Yan Zun (巖尊, fl. 80 BCE – 10 CE).
- The "Heshang Gong" version is named after the legendary Heshang Gong ("legendary sage"), who supposedly lived during the reign of Emperor Wen of Han (180–157 BCE). This commentary has a preface written by Ge Xuan (164–244 CE), granduncle of Ge Hong, and scholarship dates this version to c. the 3rd century CE.
- The origins of the "Wang Bi" version have greater verification than either of the above. Wang Bi (226–249 CE) was a Three Kingdoms-period philosopher and commentator on the Tao Te Ching and I Ching.

=== History ===
The Heshang Gong has Dunhuang manuscripts dating back to 270 CE, but rose to prominence alongside Taoism in the fifth and sixth centuries with imperial patronage. Most Tang dynasty sources, such as the Qunshu zhiyao encyclopedia, excerpted the Heshang Gong, remaining dominant into the Song dynasty. Tang and Song dynasty scholars promoted Wang Bi, comparing old manuscripts and other versions to preserve what they took to be the older reading. Early modern scholars Yao Nai (1732–1815), Xu Dachun (1693–1771) and Ma Xulun (1884–1970) continued to argue Wang Bi to be the standard text.

Wang Bi's language suggests "old manuscript" readings as in the Guodian, Mawangdui, Wenzi, Huainanzi, and Zhan Guo Ce. Although famous in it's own time, Wang Bi was attached to no particular school. It became famous and survived only because it was considered a superior analysis, becoming popular again in early Tang classical studies. Some scholars, such as Lu Deming (556(?)–630) preferred Wang Bi. Lu Deming considered the Heshang Gong intellectual enough, but promoted Wang Bi because he considered Heshang Gong a "fake" text more relevant for "bringing order to one’s body and to the state", and not the "true" reading of Laozi.

In 719, Liu Zhiji argued Wang Bi's superiority and that the Heshang Gong's mythological content was not worthy of the classic Laozi text. The scholarly Tang State Council considered Wang Bi more sophisticated in "probing the essentials of the way", but considered the Heshang Gong to have it's own encompassing teaching and value, more "accessible" in "setting up clear arguments", "nurturing the spirit", and "spreading the Way". They did not consider it very important that "Heshang Gong" was a title for an unrecorded hermit who supposedly flew to heaven. Although Wang Bi enjoyed prominent scholarly support, the Tang State declared it would leave Heshang Gong in place because Wang Bi did not have common enough usage. In 731, Emperor Xuanzong of Tang declared himself authoritative, inheriting a claim to descend from Laozi including the last name "Li."

== Text ==
The modern Tao te Ching is divided into two parts; part one, chapters 1–37, which came to be known as the Daojing (Classic of Dao), often considered more "metaphysical"; and part two, the Dejing (Classic of Virtue), chapters 38–81, often considered more "political". Chapter one begins with "Dao", chapter thirty eight with "de". Although Dao and de are in both parts of the work, all but four of sixteen uses of the term de virtue appear in the second de "virtue" half of the work.

The typical modern Tao te Ching has chapter numbers but no titles; alongside the recovered Huangdi Sijing, the late Warring States period texts Xunzi and Han Feizi were the first to give titles to chapters. Traditional sources report that early versions had 64, 68, or 72 chapters. The later Han dynasty Heshang Gong divided it into today's number of chapters (81) and gave it chapters titles, but it wasn't universally accepted until "perhaps" the Tang dynasty.

Amongst other missing content, in particular, the shorter Guodian Laozi materials of the Warring States period Guodian Chu slips do not have the last fifteen chapters (67-81) of the Tao te Ching. The Laozi materials are moreover undivided apart from section endings. The early Han Mawangdui versions divide the text in two parts, in opposite order, with one still lacking chapter numbers. Tao Hongjing (456–535) of the Dengzhen yinjue states that (the Celestial Master school) transmitted a 5000 character text in two parts, but no division into sections (zhang).

=== Title ===
Ancient Chinese books were commonly referenced by the name of their real or supposed author, in this case the "Old Master", Laozi. As such, the Tao Te Ching is also sometimes called the Laozi, especially in Chinese sources. The title Tao te Ching is based on the terms dao and de. Though their origins date back to at least the Western Zhou, the compound term dao-de, or "way and virtue", was not used in the time of Mencius: it emerges in the late Warring States period.

The title Tao Te Ching, designating the work's status as a classic (經; 经; jīng), was first applied during the reign of Emperor Jing of Han (157–141 BCE), but "appears not to have been widely used" until near the end of the Han dynasty. Later sources added that it was Emperor Jing himself who named it a classic, but the Shiji states that his mother the Empress Dowager Dou was a more dedicated student of the text.

=== Title translations ===
In English, the title is commonly rendered Tao Te Ching, following the Wade–Giles romanization, or as Daodejing, following pinyin. It has been translated under such titles as The Classic of the Way and its Power, The Book of the Tao and Its Virtue, The Book of the Way and of Virtue, The Tao and its Characteristics, The Canon of Reason and Virtue, The Classic Book of Integrity and the Way, or A Treatise on the Principle and Its Action.

Other titles for the work include the honorific True Classic of the Way and Virtue (道德真經; Dàodé zhēnjing), the Classic of the Way and Virtue of the Highest Profound Origins (太上玄元道德經; Taishang xuanyuan daodejing), and the informal descriptive Five Thousand Character text (五千文; Wǔqiān wén). Fu Yi was of the opinion that Sima Qian says it has "five thousand plus words" as a general volume less than six thousand, not a requirement that it have exactly five thousand words. A shorter version of the Heshang Gong (5090) comes close to this, but Wang Bi's commentary brings it over 5600.

Scholarship conventionally refers to the text of the Guodian Chu slips as the Guodian Laozi Materials (GDL), or Guodian Laozi in short. It is questionable that it's three different sets of bundles represent a unified text; and are referred to as Laozi A, B, and C. A & B do only contain Laozi materials.

== Middle dating ==
Though Alan Chan of the Stanford Encyclopedia of Laozi considers a traditional dating for a whole text unlikely, he argues that archeology (e.g. Baxter) indicates that "bodies of sayings attributed to Laozi were committed to writing probably from the second half of the fifth century B.C.E." (450), consolidating in the fourth century BCE and stabilizing in the third century BCE. Chan only supposes a late Warring States period (475 – 221 BCE) dating for a (relatively) "stable" text. A.C. Graham (1989) already agreed with dating (a relatively complete text) back from the early Han Mawangdui to at least the late Warring States period even before the Guodian discovery (1993).

Although a comparatively early dating range, this theory would still place early content after Confucius (d.479), but before Zhuangzi. Linguistic studies by William Baxter (1998) and Liu Xiaogan (who advocates a traditional, early Confucius dating) pointed to a dating before the Chuci, as dated "no earlier than the middle of the Warring States period", and (an at least substantial portion) before the Inner Zhuangzi. Baxter considered the early Warring States period sufficient as an early dating range, but concedes the possibility of a (start) date halfway closer linguistically to the Shijing (e.g. Chan's mid fifth century start date) than the Inner Zhuangzi, despite differences with the Shijing.

Debated more in earlier scholarship, Scott Cook's (2012) publication of The Bamboo Texts of Guodian affirms that an at least "substantial portion" of the text can be supposed to have been written before the time of Zhuang Zhou, who is dated to e.g. 365–285 BCE (365 tail-end of the early Warring States period), predating even the earliest chapters of the Zhuangzi. Daniel Fried's (2022) digital analysis argues that the Inner Zhuangzi's authors were familiar with a Laozi text; it just doesn't exert as strong a canonical influence as in Han dynasty era writings.

The "bulk" of it is only "traceable" as far back as the early to mid fourth century BCE. Though scholar Pei Wang primarily compares Laozi, the Huangdi Sijing and Han Feizi, at least in review with Pei Wang, Yuri Pines Dao Companion to China's fa tradition expresses openness to the "indebtedness" of early Warring States period thinkers like Shen Buhai (c. 400 BCE) to Laozi. Shen Dao arguably has more directly comparable passages, but less developed views of Dao than Laozi or Zhuangzi, and was more fatalist.

=== Fourth century ===
A traditional early dating places Laozi before Zhuang Zhou in the time of Confucius (551–479 BCE). No scholarship in the west follows traditional early theory. Before the Guodian discovery (1993), D.C. Lau (1963) hypothesized that a Laozi text likely existed by the beginning of the third century BCE. Lau greatly contributes to a late dating theory in modern Sinology, expecting a late Warring States (475 – 221 BCE) compilation for a Tao te Ching.

Because the Guodian's (c. 300 BCE) Laozi materials are shorter, they do not eliminate late dating theories for completion of the text, but do make a text (or at least "intellectual field") before the third century BCE more probable, taken as representative of a broader oral tradition. Few scholars follow old "after-Zhuangzi" late dating theories as such. Most modern scholarship holds the text to be a compilation, as typical for long-form early Chinese texts.

Alan Chan's SEP includes Bruce & Taeko Brooks (1998) as an example of early modern dating based in the Analects of Confucius, with subsequent surrounding studies as projecting the work farther back. The Brooks considered the Analects to have close relationship with Laozi ideas dating back to Lunyu 12, c. 326 BCE, with Mencius beginning his career in 320 BCE (late fourth century bce). Franklin Perkins (2019) believes that the Guodian Laozi "provides definitive evidence that the key ideas of the Laozi were in existence by the late fourth century bce," during the lifetime of Mencius.

There is at least one anonymized quotation in the Analects of Confucius (Lunyu 14.34), shared with chapter 63 of the Tao te Ching: "repaying hatred with virtue”. Confucius replies that hatred should instead be repaid with uprightness, repaying virtue with virtue. Bruce & Taeko Brooks dated Lunyu 14 to circa 310 BCE, though not specifically on account of the slips, suggesting familiarity with a Laozi concept of inner stillness (ch.14,16,22).

== Compilational frameworks ==
=== Dao ===
While different of meanings of Dao within the text can be explained as contextual, they can also "be accounted for by recourse to the historical argument that the text is composite." Chen Guying (1992) sees a metaphysical, ineffable dao as "linked to the deepest layer of skepticism in the text", with ultimate truth inaccessible simply to the senses. Secondly, Guying sees a natural dao in the text, considered neglected by society, with "critiques of conventional values and language." Finally, the human dao in the text lacks skepticism about language or knowledge, and is largely concerned with political and physical security.

If it existed yet, the Guodian materials do not more specifically include the famed first chapter of the work, which begins e.g. "The Way that can be spoken of is not the constant Way.” They do include the concept "Dao is constant in being without a name." Notably, they include chapter 25; if it does not yet have an idea of Dao as unchanging or complete, as questioned by Thomas Michael (2022), it has one of Dao as standing on its own, as a "basic principle" (Feng Youlan) or "undifferentiated oneness" born before heaven and earth.

=== Phenomenology ===
Philosophy on the limits of language are yet undeveloped in another discovered text, the Fanwu liuxing. Laozi 14 more specifically rejects an idea that can be found in the Fanwu liuxing, that "the one can be grasped by the senses." But Laozi 14 isn't part of the Guodian.

Looked for but not seen—it is named minute. Listened for but not heard—it is named slight. Reached for but not attained—it is named smooth. These three cannot be fully calculated, so they are confused and become one. Laozi 14

Thomas Michael sees a phenomenology in the Tao te Ching as developing out of bodily cultivation. He considers a jing 静 a central idea in the text; to be (clear, settled, calm, tranquil). Chapter 15 asks: "what can be turbid and through jing become gradually clear?", with a literal example of muddy water settling to become clear.

Michael sees a metaphysical analysis of the text as only coming later, in the Heshang Gong, in which the aspirant can only witness dao after emptying his mind and becoming tranquil. The Heshang Gong can still primarily be seen as understanding the text in terms of "Taoist longevity practices known as 'nurturing the vital energy.'" Although interpretations of the works are diverse, the Song dynasty primarily interpreted it in terms of internal alchemy, following Buddhist logic interpretations in the Tang dynasty.

Hansen (1992) considered the text's goal "transformation of body and mind" rather than mystical experience, interpreting the Dao as "a linguistic pointer of logic." Livia Kohn, Graham and La Fargue considered it to have a mystical dimension, but not based on a metaphysical absolute or "One" behind reality. Recalled as a "nonstereotypical interpretation of Dao", Graham (1989) accorded it "practical goals" of relaxing the body, calming and freeing the mind, and letting problems solve themselves.

=== War ===
Use of terms like "ten thousand chariots" and renyi "humanity-righteousness" e.g. by Mencius support a Warring States development - or at least interpolation - of the text, as they are not known to predate the period. The terms are "non-existent" in the fifth century, but become "ubiquitous" after. Franklin Perkins (2024) provides an example of a line on war added to Chapter 46, not present in the Guodian Laozi. Though he does not consider it "out of place", he suggests it makes the chapter to read more as "an explanation for the causes of wars" than "general principles about desire."

When the world has the way, saddle-horses are returned to manure the fields. When it lacks the way, war horses are born in the suburbs.

- Of crimes, none is weightier than deep desires. Of shames, none is more dangerous than desiring to attain. Of harms, none is greater than not knowing contentment. If one knows contentment as contentment, that is constant contentment.

The subject of military success itself does exist in the Guodian Laozi, saying that there will not be bragging if the ruler follows the Dao.

=== Ch. 67-81 ===
The Guodian Chu slips do not have the last fifteen chapters (67-81) of the Tao te Ching. While it could be claimed that they were already in existence somewhere else, Perkin's does not believe their absence can be coincidental. If they were already written, it would make the Guodian a likely curation, deliberately excluding them. But there is no evidence for this. Perkins argues that they strongly suggest a later merging. If they were later compiled to alter or qualify the interpetation of Laozi materials, Perkins doubts they were originally written in relation to them. There is not enough attempt to reconcile their views.

When these chapters do appear in the Mawangdui Silk Texts, they instead begin with what is now chapters 80 & 81, "taking death seriously". The modern texts begins with an introductory focus on a way of heaven and “three treasures” (67), (with at least one) supported by heaven.

Now, with nurturing care, if they go to battle, they are victorious; if they undertake protective measures, they are secure. Heaven will establish them, as if using nurturing care to fortify them. Ch.67

Perkins sees the chapters as presenting a different world view opposed to the Guodian Laozi, with support for punishment, a lack of skepticism about language and moralization, and a lack of internal self cultivation practices. They make no use of concepts wu wei "nonaction", stillness or quietude (jing 靜), emptiness (xu 虛), unhewn simplicity (pu 樸), reducing desires, or "the way order spontaneously arises through nonaction."

They include dao and wu non-being, but not as an "ultimate ground", instead favoring heaven as assisting those who are good and promote benefit and equality. Chapter 32 of the Guodian Laozi says that "heaven and earth cannot make dao their subordinate." Focusing on a "way of heaven" rather than the dao itself, Chapter 68 refers to heaven as "the ultimate of the ancients." Chapter 72 includes "fearing authority and might", Chapter 73 "what heaven hates", 74 "the importance of fearing death"; and 80 "taking death seriously."

== Contents ==
=== Themes ===
The Dào Dé Jīng describes the Tao as the source and ideal of all existence: it is unseen, but not transcendent, immensely powerful yet supremely humble, being the root of all things. People have desires and free will (and thus are able to alter their own nature). Many act "unnaturally", upsetting the natural balance of the Tao. The Dào Dé Jīng intends to lead students to a "return" to their natural state, in harmony with Tao. Language and conventional wisdom are critically assessed. Taoism views them as inherently biased and artificial, widely using paradoxes to sharpen the point.

Wu wei, literally 'non-action' or 'not acting', is a central concept of the Dào Dé Jīng. The concept of wu wei is multifaceted, and reflected in the words' multiple meanings, even in English translation; it can mean "not doing anything", "not forcing", "not acting" in the theatrical sense, "creating nothingness", "acting spontaneously", and "flowing with the moment".

This concept is used to explain ziran, or harmony with the Tao. It includes the concepts that value distinctions are ideological and seeing ambition of all sorts as originating from the same source. Dào Dé Jīng used the term broadly with simplicity and humility as key virtues, often in contrast to selfish action. On a political level, it means avoiding such circumstances as war, harsh laws and heavy taxes. Some Taoists see a connection between wu wei and esoteric practices, such as zuowang ('sitting in oblivion': emptying the mind of bodily awareness and thought) found in the Zhuangzi.

=== Structure and style ===
The Tao Te Ching is a text of around 5,162 to 5,450 Chinese characters in 81 brief chapters or sections (章). There is some evidence that the chapter divisions were later additions—for commentary, or as aids to rote memorisation—and that the original text was more fluidly organised. It has two parts, the Tao Ching (道經; chapters 1–37) and the Te Ching (德經; chapters 38–81), which may have been edited together into the received text, possibly reversed from an original Te Tao Ching.

Contrasting with Confucianism, its general statements are free of narration or reference to "any particular persons, times, or places." The written style is laconic, with few grammatical particles. While the ideas are singular, the style is poetic, combining two major strategies: short, declarative statements, and intentional contradictions, encouraging varied, contradictory interpretations. The first of these strategies creates memorable phrases, while the second forces the reader to reconcile supposed contradictions. With a partial reconstruction of the pronunciation of Old Chinese spoken during the Tao Te Ching's composition, approximately three-quarters rhymed in the original language.

The Chinese characters in the earliest versions were written in seal script, while later versions were written in clerical script and regular script styles.

== Old late theory ==
Challenged by the Guodian discovery, few modern scholars follow a full late theory modernly as to suppose none of it was written before Zhuangzi. Nonetheless, the Stanford Encyclopedia (of Laozi) still only supposes a late dating for modern versions of the text, probably reaching "a relatively stable form" dating back to the late Warring States period, or "middle of the third century B.C.E" (circa 250 BCE), drawing from collections consolidated during the fourth century BCE.

Though debated more in early scholarship, early modern scholars like Feng Youlan and Herrlee G. Creel still considered the work a compilation; Gu Jiegang believed it to have been written over three centuries. Discussing concepts of names and realities, Feng Youlan theorized the school of names as preceding the work, therefore supposing it as coming after Gongsun Long or Hui Shi. But the Tao te Ching does not demonstrate school of names influence the way the Zhuangzi does.

Creel argued that the Tao te Ching's complex ideas on wu wei government could well be expected to come after simpler ideas of personal practices represented in the Zhuangzi. The Analects have wu wei as an idea of government, but one of virtue, not a technique of governmental control like the Tao te Ching. Traditionally taken as preceding Shen Buhai, Creel proposed that Shen Buhai may have preceded it as well, instead supposing him as developing out of Confucius. But Creel admits that Shen Buhai does bear a "striking" resemblance to Laozi.

Preceding the Guodian discovery, a lack of preserved direct, formal early references preceding the Han Feizi contributed to A.C. Graham's (1989) continued late dating. While the Zhuangzi is the first reference for the Tao Te Ching, its Inner Chapters do not demonstrate familiarity with it. Thus, an early stratum representative of the Zhuangzi's core Inner Chapters may have preceded it('s completion or propagation). Liu Xiaogan terms this "After Zhuangzi" theory, taken as earlier representative of Ch'ien Mu.

The late Warring States period Han Feizi includes the Tao te Ching's earliest known commentaries. As Graham argued, the Han Feizi does make a "sustained effort" to use Laozi, but is not the most effective example of Daoistic syncretism, and is limited to a few chapters. Its Laozi arguments had likely not been around very long, or would have incorporated them more comprehensively. Its "Interpreting Laozi" is again comparable with the Guanzi. Translator W.K. Liao did consider the Han Feizi's Chapter 20 "Commentaries on Lao Tzŭ's Teachings" academically thorough.

== Translation ==
The Tao Te Ching has been translated into Western languages over 250 times, mostly to English, German, and French. Another estimate is that there have been 1930 translations into 94 languages. According to Holmes Welch, "It is a famous puzzle which everyone would like to feel he had solved." The first English translation of the Tao Te Ching was produced in 1868 by the Scottish Protestant missionary John Chalmers, entitled The Speculations on Metaphysics, Polity, and Morality of the "Old Philosopher" Lau-tsze. It was heavily indebted to Stanislas Julien's French translation and dedicated to James Legge, who later produced his own translation for Oxford's Sacred Books of the East.

Other notable English translations of the Tao Te Ching are those produced by Chinese scholars and teachers: a 1948 translation by linguist Lin Yutang, a 1961 translation by author John Ching Hsiung Wu, a 1963 translation by sinologist Din Cheuk Lau, another 1963 translation by professor Wing-tsit Chan, and a 1972 translation by Taoist teacher Gia-Fu Feng together with his wife Jane English.

Many translations have been written by people with a foundation in Chinese language and philosophy who have been trying to render the original meaning of the text as faithfully as possible into English. Some of the more popular translations, however, are written from a less scholarly perspective, giving an individual author's interpretation; critics of these versions claim that they deviate from the text and are not compatible with the history of Chinese thought. Russell Kirkland goes further, arguing that these versions are based on Western Orientalist fantasies and represent the colonial appropriation of Chinese culture. Other Taoism scholars, such as Michael LaFargue and Jonathan Herman, argue that, while these versions do not pretend to scholarship, they meet a real spiritual need in the West; they aim to make the wisdom of the Tao Te Ching more accessible to modern English-speaking readers by, typically, employing more familiar cultural and temporal references.

=== Challenges in translation ===
The Tao Te Ching is written in Classical Chinese, which poses a number of challenges for interpreters and translators. As Holmes Welch notes, the written language "has no active or passive, no singular or plural, no case, no person, no tense, no mood". Moreover, the received text lacks many grammatical particles which are preserved in the older Mawangdui and Beida texts, and which permit the meaning to be more precise. Lastly, many passages of the Tao Te Ching appear to be deliberately ambiguous.

Since there is very little punctuation in Classical Chinese, determining the boundaries between words and sentences is not always a trivial task; the interpreter has to decide where these phrasal boundaries are. Some translators have argued that the received text is so corrupted, due to its original medium being bamboo strips linked with silk threads, that it is impossible to understand some passages without some transposition of characters.

=== Notable translations ===
- Le Livre de la Voie et de la Vertu (in French), translated by Julien, Stanislas, Paris: Imprimerie Royale, 1842
- The Speculations on Metaphysics, Polity, and Morality of the "Old Philosopher" Lau-tsze, translated by Chalmers, John, London: Trübner, 1868, ISBN 978-0-524-07788-7
- Strauss, Victor (1870), Laò-Tsè's Taò Tĕ Kīng (in German), Leipzig: Friedrich Fleischer
- Müller, Max, ed. (1891), The Tao Teh King, Sacred Books of the East – Sacred Books of China, vol. XXXIX:V, translated by Legge, James, Oxford University Press – via Project Gutenberg.
- Giles, Lionel; et al., eds. (1905), The Sayings of Lao Tzu, The Wisdom of the East, New York: E. P. Dutton
- Wilhelm, Richard (1911), Tao te king: Das Buch des Alten vom Sinn und Leben (in German), Jena: Diederichs
- Suzuki, Daisetsu Teitaro; et al., eds. (1913), The Canon of Reason and Virtue: Lao-tze's Tao Teh King, La Salle: Open Court.
- Les Pères du Système Taoiste, Taoïsme, Vol. II (in French), translated by Wieger, Léon, Hien Hien, 1913
- The works of Lao Tzyy: Truth and nature, popularly known as Daw-der-jing, translated by Cheng, Lin, Shanghai, 1949 (Based on rectified and rearranged Chinese text, divide into 180 verses/stanzas)
- Duyvendak, J.J.L. (1954), Tao Te Ching: The Book of the Way and Its Virtue, John Murray
- Waley, Arthur (1958) [1934], The Way and Its Power, New York: Grove Press
- Chan, Wing-tsit (1963), The Way of Lao Tzu: Tao-te ching, Indianapolis: Bobbs-Merrill
- Schwarz, Ernst (1970), Laudse: Daudedsching (in German), Leipzig: Reclam
- Houang, François and Leyris, Pierre (1979), La Voie et sa vertu: Tao-tê-king (in French), Paris: Éditions du Seuil
- Tao Te Ching: A New English Version, translated by Mitchell, Stephen, New York: Harper Collins, 1988, ISBN 978-0-06-180739-8.
- Henricks, Robert G. (1989), Lao-tzu: Te-tao ching. A New Translation Based on the Recently Discovered Ma-wang-tui Texts, New York: Ballantine Books, ISBN 0-345-34790-0
- Tao Te Ching, translated by Lau, D. C., Hong Kong: Chinese University Press, 1989, ISBN 9789622014671
- Tao Te Ching: The Classic Book of Integrity and the Way, translated by Mair, Victor H., New York: Bantam, 1990, ISBN 978-0-307-43463-0.
- Tao-Te-Ching, translated by Bryce, Derek; et al., York Beach: Samuel Weiser, 1991, ISBN 978-1-60925-441-4
- Addiss, Stephen and Lombardo, Stanley (1991) Tao Te Ching, Indianapolis/Cambridge: Hackett Publishing Company.
- Ursula K. Le Guin with Jerome P. Seaton, Lao Tzu: Tao Te Ching: A Book about the Way and the Power of Way, Shambhala Press, 1998, ISBN 978-1611807240.
- David Hinton, Tao Te Ching, Counterpoint Press, 2001, ISBN 978-1582431826.
- Chad Hansen, Laozi: Tao Te Ching on The Art of Harmony, Duncan Baird Publications, 2009
- Red Pine, Lao-tzu's Taoteching, Copper Canyon Press, 2009, ISBN 978-1556592904
- Sinedino, Giorgio (2015), Dao De Jing (in Portuguese), São Paulo: Editora Unesp
- Polymeros, Konstantinos G. (2021), Dao De Jing: The Old Man's Poem. (Greek: Τάο Τε Τζινγκ, το ποίημα του γηραιού - Tao Te Tzingk: to poiema tou geraiou). Lamia: Legga Gaea Editions.

== See also ==
- Bogar
- Ecclesiastes
- Huahujing
- Huainanzi
- Huangdi Yinfujing
- Qingjing Jing
- Sanhuangjing
- Straw dog
- Taiping Jing
- Xishengjing
- Four Books and Five Classics

== Sources ==
- Allan, Sarah; Williams, Crispin (2000). The Guodian Laozi: Proceedings of the International Conference, Dartmouth College, May 1998. Berkeley, Calif.: Society for the Study of Early China and Institute of East Asian Studies, University of California. ISBN 978-1-55729-069-4. PhilPapers: Tao Te Ching at PhilPapers.
- Ariel, Yoav; Raz, Gil (2010), "Anaphors or Cataphors? A Discussion of the Two qi 其 Graphs in the First Chapter of the Daodejing", Philosophy East and West, 60 (3), University of Hawai'i Press: 391–421, doi:10.1353/PEW.0.0108, JSTOR 40666591, S2CID 170969512
- Brooks, E. Bruce; Brooks, A. Taeko (1998). The Original Analects: Sayings of Confucius and His Successors. Columbia University Press. ISBN 978-0231104319.
- Barlow, Jeffrey G. (1985). Donald H. Bishop (ed.). Chinese Thought: An Introduction. Motilal Banarsidass. ISBN 9780836411300.
- Baxter, William H. (1998). "Situating the Language of the Lao-tzu: The Probable Date of the Tao-te-ching". In Kohn, Livia; LaFargue, Michael (eds.). Lao-tzu and the Tao-te-ching. Albany: State University of New York Press. pp. 231–253.
- Boltz, William G. (1993), "Lao tzu Tao-te-ching", in Loewe, Michael (ed.), Early Chinese Texts: A Bibliographical Guide, Berkeley, CA: University of California Press, pp. 269–92, ISBN 1-55729-043-1.
- Chan, Alan (2017). "Laozi". In Zalta, Edward N.; Nodelman, Uri (eds.). Stanford Encyclopedia of Philosophy (Spring 2017 ed.).
  - Chan, Alan (2017a), "§0. Introduction", Laozi, Stanford Encyclopedia of Philosophy, Stanford University
- Chan, Alan (2013), "Laozi", Stanford Encyclopedia of Philosophy, Stanford University.
- Chan, Alan (2025), "Laozi", Stanford Encyclopedia of Philosophy, Stanford University.
  - Chan, Alan (2025a), "§0. Introduction", Laozi, Stanford Encyclopedia of Philosophy, Stanford University
  - Chan, Alan (2025b), "§1. The Laozi Story", Laozi, Stanford Encyclopedia of Philosophy, Stanford University
  - Chan, Alan (2025c), "§2. Date and Authorship of the Laozi", Laozi, Stanford Encyclopedia of Philosophy, Stanford University
  - Chan, Alan (2025d), "§3. Textual Traditions", Laozi, Stanford Encyclopedia of Philosophy, Stanford University
  - Chan, Alan (2025f), "§5. Approaches to the Laozi", Laozi, Stanford Encyclopedia of Philosophy, Stanford University
- Chan, Shirley, ed. (2019). Dao Companion to the Excavated Guodian Bamboo Manuscripts. Dao Companions to Chinese Philosophy. Vol. 10. Cham: Springer. doi:10.1007/978-3-030-04633-0. ISBN 978-3-030-04632-3. OCLC 1055562095.
  - Chan, Shirley (2019b). "Introduction: The Excavated Guodian 郭店 Bamboo Manuscripts". In Chan, Shirley (ed.). Dao Companion to the Excavated Guodian Bamboo Manuscripts. Dao Companions to Chinese Philosophy. Vol. 10. Cham: Springer. pp. 1–17. doi:10.1007/978-3-030-04633-01 (inactive 4 November 2026).
  - Perkins, Franklin (2019). "Chapter 2: The Guodian Laozi 老子 Materials". In Chan, Shirley (ed.). Dao Companion to the Excavated Guodian Bamboo Manuscripts. Springer. pp. 21–39. doi:10.1007/978-3-030-04633-0_2.
  - Cook, Constance A. (2019). "Chapter 6: Which Comes First? Dao 道 or De 德: Evidence from the Guodian Manuscripts". Dao Companion to the Excavated Guodian Bamboo Manuscripts. pp. 117–138. doi:10.1007/978-3-030-04633-0_6.
- Chang, Leo S (1998). The Four Political Treatises of the Yellow Emperor: Original Mawangdui Texts with Complete English Translations and an Introduction. Society for Asian and Comparative Philosophy. Monograph No.15. University of Hawaiʻi Press.
- Chong, Kim-chong, ed. (2022). Dao Companion to the Philosophy of the Zhuangzi. Dao Companions to Chinese Philosophy. Springer. doi:10.1007/978-3-030-92331-0. ISBN 978-3-030-92330-3.
  - Klein, Esther (2022). "Early Chinese Culture and the Zhuangzi Anthology: An Alternative Model for Authorship". In Chong, Kim-chong (ed.). Dao Companion to the Philosophy of the Zhuangzi. Springer. pp. 37–57. doi:10.1007/978-3-030-92331-0_3. ISBN 978-3-030-92330-3.
- Cole, Alan (August 2006), "Simplicity for the Sophisticated: Rereading the Daode Jing for the Polemics of Ease and Innocence", History of Religions, 46 (1), University of Chicago Press: 1–49, doi:10.1086/507927, JSTOR 10.1086/507927, S2CID 170162034
- Cook, Scott Bradley (2012). The Bamboo Texts of Guodian: a study & complete translation. Cornell East Asia series. New York: Cornell University. ISBN 978-1-933947-84-6.
- Creel, Herrlee Glessner (15 September 1982) [1970]. What Is Taoism?: And Other Studies in Chinese Cultural History. University of Chicago Press. ISBN 9780226120478. JSTOR 1397689. OCLC 1256745090 – via Google Books.
- Creel, Herrlee Glessner (1974). Shen Pu-hai: Chinese Political Philosopher of the Fourth Century B.C. University of Chicago Press. ISBN 978-0-226-12027-0.
- Damascene, Hieromonk; Lou, Shibai; Tang, You-Shan (1999), Christ the Eternal Tao, Platina, CA: Saint Herman Press
- Fried, Daniel (2022). "Zhuangzi and Laozi: An Intertextual Approach". In Chong, Kim-chong (ed.). Dao Companion to the Philosophy of the Zhuangzi. Dao Companions to Chinese Philosophy. Vol. 16. Springer. pp. 379–404. doi:10.1007/978-3-030-92331-0_15. ISBN 978-3-030-92331-0. "Digital analysis of intertexts shows that the Laozi was likely known to the composers of the Zhuangzi Inner Chapters, but only exerted a strong canonical influence on the later Han-era strata of the Outer and Mixed chapters"
- Eliade, Mircea (1984), A History of Religious Ideas, vol. 2: From Gautama Buddha to the Triumph of Christianity, translated by Trask, Willard R., University of Chicago Press, ISBN 978-0-226-20403-1
- Emerson, John (2013). Shen Dao: Text, Translation, and Study. Éditions Le Real. OCLC 911414271.
- Fech, Andrej (2022). "Avoiding the Trap of Parallelism: Interlocking Parallel Style in the Interpretation of Laozi 29". Religions. 13 (9): 788. doi:10.3390/rel13090788.
- Goldin, Paul R. (2005). After Confucius: Studies In Early Chinese Philosophy. University of Hawai'i Press. ISBN 978-0-8248-2842-4.
- Goldin, Paul R. (2012). Dao Companion to the Philosophy of Han Fei. Dao Companions to Chinese Philosophy. University of Pennsylvania: Springer. ISBN 978-0-19-760347-5.
  - Pines, Yuri (2013), Submerged by Absolute Power: The Ruler's Predicament in the Han Feizi. In: Dao Companion to the Philosophy of Han Fei (PDF), pp. 67–86, doi:10.1007/978-94-007-4318-2_4, ISBN 978-94-007-4317-5
- Graham, A.C. (1989). Disputers of the Tao: Philosophical Argument in Ancient China. Open Court. ISBN 978-0-8126-9942-5.
- Hansen, Chad (1992). A Daoist Theory of Chinese Thought. Oxford: Oxford University Press. ISBN 978-0-19-535076-0.
- Hansen, Chad (2024). "Zhuangzi". In Zalta, Edward N.; Nodelman, Uri (eds.). The Stanford Encyclopedia of Philosophy (Summer 2024 ed.). Metaphysics Research Lab, Stanford University.
- Hansen, Chad (2024b). "Daoism". In Zalta, Edward N.; Nodelman, Uri (eds.). Stanford Encyclopedia of Philosophy (Summer 2024 ed.).
- Hua, Shiping, ed. (2022). Chinese Ideology. London: Routledge. ISBN 978-1-032-04947-2.
  - Michael, Thomas (2021). "The Daoist contribution to Chinese ideology: A political reading of Heshang Gong's Daodejing". In Hua, Shiping (ed.). Chinese Ideology. London: Routledge. pp. 40–56. doi:10.4324/9781003007364-5. ISBN 978-1-032-04947-2.
- Harris, Eirik Lang (2016). The Shenzi Fragments. New York: Columbia University Press. ISBN 9780231542166.
- Jiang, Tao (2021). Origins of Moral-political Philosophy in Early China. Oxford: Oxford University Press. ISBN 978-0-19-760347-5.
- Jin, Dejian (1963). Sima Qian suo jian shu kao 司馬遷所見書考. Shanghai: Shanghai ren ming chu ban she. OCLC 20065670.
- Kaltenmark, Max (1969). Lao Tzu and Taoism. Translated by Roger Greaves. Stanford University Press.
- Kim, Hongkyung (2012). The Old Master: A Syncretic Reading of the Laozi from the Mawangdui Text A Onward. State University of New York Press. ISBN 978-1-4384-4013-2.
- Klaus, Hilmar (2009) [2008], Das Tao der Weisheit. Laozi-Daodejing [The Tao of Wisdom. Laozi-Daodejing] (in German and English), Aachen: Mainz
- LaFargue, Michael (1998), Kohn, Livia; LaFargue, Michael (eds.), Lao-tzu and the Tao-te-ching, Albany, NY: State University of New York Press, ISBN 978-0-7914-3600-4
  - Robinet, Isabelle (1998). "Later Commentaries: Textual Polysemy and Syncretistic Interpretations". Lao-tzu and the Tao-te-ching. pp. 117–149.
- Lau, D. C. (1970) [1963]. Lao Tzu: Tao Te Ching. Translated by Lau, D. C. Harmondsworth: Penguin Books. ISBN 978-0140441314.
- Liao, W.K. (1939). The Complete Works of Han Fei Tzu. Arthur Probsthain.
- Loy, David (1985). "Chapter One of the "Tao Tê Ching": A 'New' Interpretation". Religious Studies. 21 (3). Cambridge University Press: 369–379. doi:10.1017/S0034412500017455.
- Lundahl, Bertil (1992). Lundahl, Bertil (ed.). Han Fei Zi: The Man and the Work. Institute of Oriental Languages, Stockholm University. ISBN 9789171530790.
- LaFargue, Michael; Pas, Julian (1998), "On Translating the Tao-te-ching", in Kohn, Livia; LaFargue, Michael (eds.), Lao-tzu and the Tao-te-ching, Albany, NY: State University of New York Press, pp. 277–302, ISBN 978-0-7914-3600-4
- Michael, Thomas (2022). "The Original Text of the Daodejing: Disentangling Versions and Recensions". Religions. 13 (4): 325. doi:10.3390/rel13040325.
- Mou, Bo (2008). Routledge History of Chinese Philosophy. Taylor & Francis. ISBN 978-1-134-24937-4.
- Peerenboom, Randall P. (1993). Law and Morality in Ancient China: the Silk Manuscripts of Huang-Lao. SUNY Press. ISBN 9781438415741.
- Pines, Yuri (2016). "Dating a Pre-Imperial Text: The Case Study of the Book of Lord Shang". Early China. 39: 145–184. doi:10.1017/eac.2016.3.
  - Pines, Yuri (2016d). "Dating a Pre-Imperial Text: The Case Study of the Book of Lord Shang". Early China. 39. p.145–184. The Text's Dating: A Tentative Reconstruction. B. The Chapter's Language. doi:10.1017/eac.2016.3.
- Pines, Yuri (2017). The Book of Lord Shang: Apologetics of State Power in Early China. Columbia University Press. ISBN 9780231542333.
- Pines, Yuri (2024). Dao Companion to China's fa Tradition. Hebrew University of Jerusalem: Springer. ISBN 9789048129270.
  - Pines, Yuri (2024b), Chapter 1 Shang Yang and The Book of Lord Shang. In: Pines, Y. (eds) Dao Companion to China's fa Tradition (PDF), Springer, Cham, pp. 23–56, doi:10.2307/600068, JSTOR 600068
  - Pines, Yuri (2024c), "Chapter 4 Han Feizi: The World Driven by Self-Interest", Chapter 4. Han Feizi: The World Driven by Self-Interest. In: Pines, Y. (eds) Dao Companion to China's fa Tradition (PDF), Dao Companions to Chinese Philosophy, vol. 19, Springer, Cham, pp. 99–138, doi:10.1007/978-3-031-53630-4_5, ISBN 9783031536298
  - Lewis, Mark Edward. "Chapter 11 The Ruler in the Polity of Objective Standards". In Pines (2024), pp. 315-349.
- Smith, Kidder (2003). "Sima Tan and the Invention of Daoism, "Legalism," et cetera". The Journal of Asian Studies. 62 (1): 129–156. doi:10.2307/3096138. JSTOR 3096138.
- Xiaogan Liu (1995). Classifying the Zhuangzi Chapters. Michigan Monographs in Chinese Studies, vol. 65. Ann Arbor: University of Michigan Press. doi:10.3998/mpub.19186. ISBN 9780472901340.
- Liu, Xiaogan (2015). Xiaogan Liu (ed.). Dao Companion to Daoist Philosophy. Springer. ISBN 9789048129270.
  - Csikszentmihalyi, Mark (2015). "Thematic Analyses of the Laozi". In Liu, Xiaogan (ed.). Dao Companion to Daoist Philosophy. Springer. pp. 47–70. doi:10.1007/978-90-481-2927-0_4. ISBN 978-90-481-2926-3.
- Kohn, Livia, ed. (2000), Daoism Handbook, Handbook of Oriental Studies, Section 4: China, vol. 14, Boston: Brill, doi:10.1163/9789004391840, ISBN 978-9004112087
- Kohn, Livia; LaFargue, Michael, eds. (1998). Lao-tzu and the Tao-te-ching. State University of New York Press. ISBN 978-0791436004.
  - Chan, Alan K. L. "The Daode Jing and Its Tradition". In Kohn (2000), pp. 1–29.
- Komjathy, Louis (2008), Handbooks for Daoist Practice (10 vols.), Hong Kong: Yuen Yuen Institute
- Perkins, Franklin (2024). "Divergences within the Laozi: A Study of Chapters 67~81". Journal of Literature, History & Philosophy. 0 (5): 122–135.
- Schwartz, Benjamin (1985). The World of Thought in Ancient China. Harvard: Harvard University Press. ISBN 978-0-674-96191-3.
- Slingerland, Edward (2007). Effortless Action: Wu-wei As Conceptual Metaphor and Spiritual Ideal in Early China. Oxford; New York: Oxford University Press. ISBN 9780195138993.
- Van Norden, Bryan W.; Ivanhoe, Philip J. (2006), Readings in Classical Chinese Philosophy (2nd ed.), Indianapolis, IN: Hackett, ISBN 978-0-87220-780-6
- Wagner, Rudolf G. (2003). A Chinese Reading of the Daodejing: Wang Bi's Commentary on the Laozi with Critical Text and Translation. State University of New York Press. ISBN 978-0-7914-5181-6.
- Watts, Alan; Huang, Chung-liang (1975), Tao: The Watercourse Way, New York: Pantheon, ISBN 978-0-394-73311-1
- Welch, Holmes (1965) [1957], Taoism: The Parting of the Way, Boston: Beacon, ISBN 978-0-8070-5973-9
- Xin, Xiaoxiao; Xie, Pan; Wang, Qinling (2025). "Representation of Daoist Knowledge Based on Philological Readings: An Analysis of Robert Henricks' English Translation of Guodian Laozi". Religions. 16 (12): 1519. doi:10.3390/rel16121519.
- Yates, Robin D. S. (1997). Five Lost Classics: Tao, Huang-Lao, and Yin-Yang in Han China. Ballantine Books. ISBN 978-0345365385.
- Youlan, Feng (1976) [1948]. A Short History of Chinese Philosophy. Free Press. ISBN 978-0-684-83634-8.
