= Gao Heng (legal scholar) =

Chinese legal scholar and historian (1930–2019)

- Traditional Chinese: 高恆
- Simplified Chinese: 高恒
Transcriptions
Standard Mandarin
- Hanyu Pinyin: Gāo Héng
- Wade–Giles: Kao^{1} Hêng^{2}
- IPA: [káʊ xə̌ŋ]

Gao Heng (Chinese: 高恒; January 1930 – 22 August 2019) was a Chinese legal scholar and historian, known for his research on the Shuihudi Qin bamboo texts and the legal systems of the Qin and Han dynasties. He was a research professor at the Institute of Law, Chinese Academy of Social Sciences (CASS). He was elected an honorary academician of the CASS in 2006.

== Biography ==
Gao was born in January 1930 in Guanghua County (now Laohekou), Hubei, Republic of China. After graduating from Provincial Jiangling High School, he entered Wuhan University in 1950 to study law. Upon graduation in 1955, he was selected to study in the Soviet Union and spent a year learning Russian at the Beijing Russian College. He entered the Department of Law of Moscow State University in November 1956, and graduated in February 1961 with an associate doctor degree.

After returning to China in 1961, Gao was assigned to work at the Institute of Law of the Chinese Academy of Sciences (part of the Chinese Academy of Social Sciences since May 1977). During the Cultural Revolution, he was sent to perform manual labour at a May Seventh Cadre School in Henan.

After the end of the Cultural Revolution, he was promoted to associate professor in 1982 and professor in 1988. He retired in December 1990. In August 2006, he was among the first batch of scholars to be elected honorary academicians of the Chinese Academy of Social Sciences.

Gao died in Beijing on 22 August 2019, aged 89.

== Contributions ==
In his early career, Gao published many papers about the legal systems of the Soviet Union and the West, a few of which were published in the major national newspapers the People's Daily and the Guangming Daily, as well as the journal Legal Research. He also translated a number of legal works into Chinese.

Beginning in the 1970s, Gao focused his research on the Shuihudi Qin bamboo texts, a large cache of Qin dynasty government and legal documents unearthed in 1975. His initial findings were published in the 1977 book Shuìhǔdì Qínmù Zhújiǎn (睡虎地秦墓竹簡), which he co-authored. He proposed a systematic overview of the Qin dynasty's penal servitude laws and concluded that Qin's penal servitude was a lifelong punishment, which was only abolished by Emperor Wen of the Western Han in 167 BC. The finding caused a sensation in academia at the time, as it overturned erroneous understandings of the laws of Qin and Han held by scholars since Yan Shigu of the Tang dynasty and Wang Yinglin of the Song dynasty. He also studied Qin's economic laws such as the Jinbu Lü (金布律; "currency and property law") and Han dynasty documents such as those found in Juyan.

Gao's research on the legal history of China was highly influential. He co-edited the General History of Chinese Legal System and the General History of Chinese Legal Thoughts, among other major systematic works in the field.
