= Bamboo Texts of Guodian =

Archaeological discovery in 1993 in Hubei, China

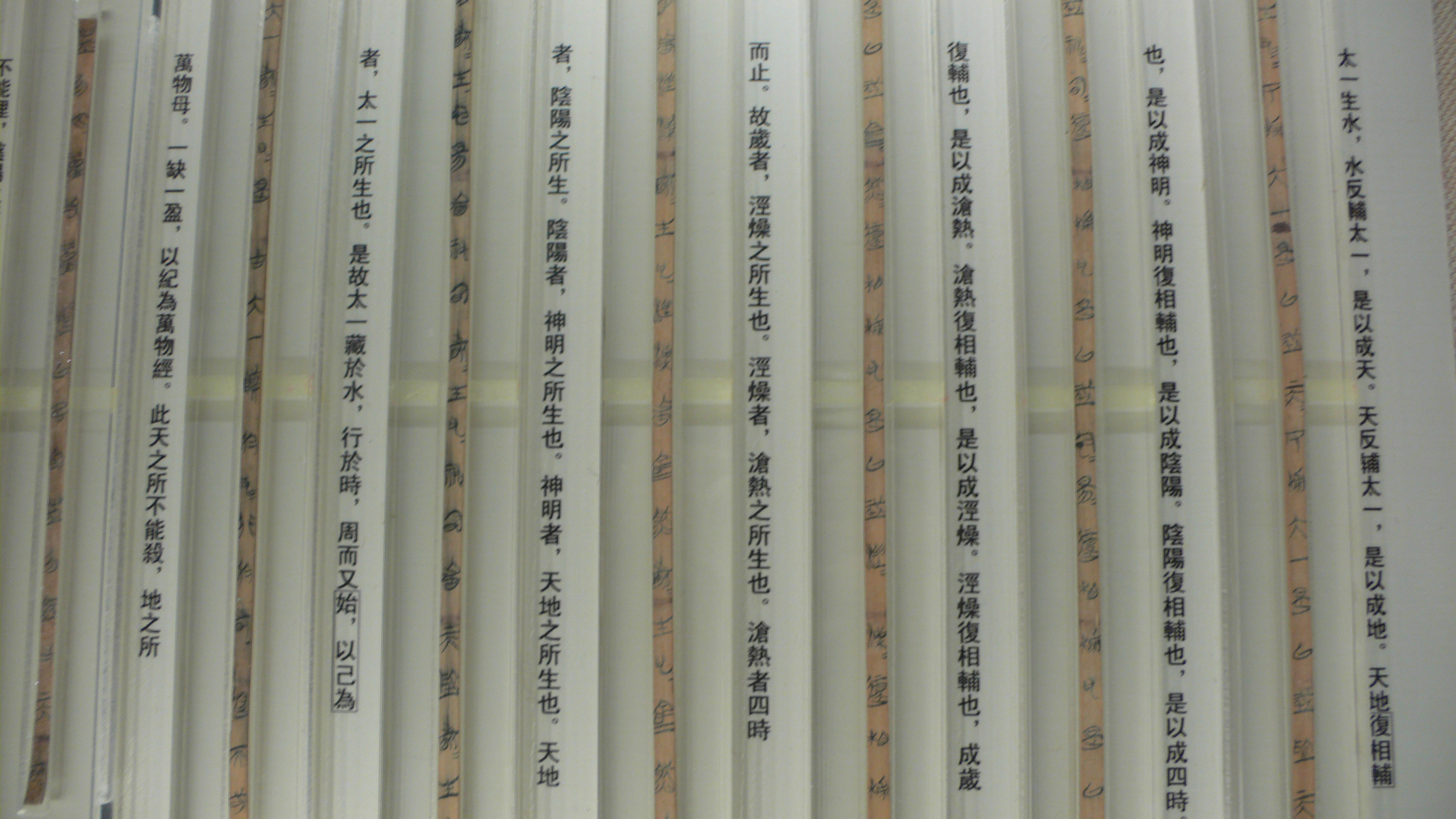
- Part of the Bamboo Texts of Guodian: "The Great One Generates Water," held at the Hubei Provincial Museum
- Material: Bamboo slips
- Period/culture: Circa 300 BCE
- Place: Jingmen, Hubei Province, China
- Present location: Hubei Provincial Museum

Location

The Bamboo Texts of Guodian (Chinese: 郭店楚簡; pinyin: Guōdiàn Chǔjiǎn) were unearthed in October 1993 in Tomb no. 1 of the Guodian tombs in Jingmen, Hubei Province and dated to the latter half of the Warring States period. Scott Cook completed a study and translation of all the manuscripts of this corpus.

== Background ==
Tomb no. 1 is located in Jishan District's Guodian tomb complex, near Jingmen City in the village of Guodian. It is located just nine kilometers north of Ying, which was the ancient Chu capital from about 676 BC until 278 BC, before the State of Chu was overrun by Qin. Studies of the tomb's contents revealed its occupant to be an elderly noble scholar, and teacher to a royal prince. The prince has been identified as Crown Prince Heng, who later became King Qingxiang of Chu. Since King Qingxiang was the Chu king when Qin sacked their old capital Ying in 278 BC, the texts are dated to around 300 BC.

== Content ==
There are in total about 804 bamboo slips in this cache, including 702 strips and 27 broken strips. The bamboo slip texts consist of three major categories, which include the earliest manuscripts of the received text of the Tao Te Ching, one chapter from the Classic of Rites, content from the Classic of History and other writings. After restoration, these texts were divided into eighteen sections, transcribed into standard Chinese and published under the title Chu Bamboo Slips from Guodian in May 1998.

The slip-texts include both Taoist and Confucian works, many previously unknown, contributing fresh information for scholars studying the history of philosophical thought in ancient China. According to Gao Zheng from the Institute of Philosophy of the Chinese Academy of Social Sciences, the main part could have been teaching material used by the Confucianist Si Meng scholars of the Jixia Academy in the State of Qi. Qu Yuan, who was sent as an envoy to Qi, might have taken them back to Chu.

Recent scholarship has questioned the value of categorizing works that date prior to pre-Han as strictly Confucian or Taoist. These categories only appeared during the Han and do not relate in any meaningful way to Guodian. The diversity of views represented in the tomb is a perfect example of the blurring of these lines.

== Texts ==
Number	Chinese	English
1–3	老子甲、乙、丙	Laozi A, B & C
4	太一生水	The Great One Generates Water
5	緇衣	Black Robes
6	魯穆公問子思	Duke Mu of Lu Asked Zisi
7	窮達以時	Failure and Success Depend on the Age
8	唐虞之道	The Way of Tang and Yu
9	五行	The Five Conducts
10	忠信之道	The Way of Loyalty and Good Faith
11	成之聞之	Completing it Informs it
12	尊德義	Revering Virtue and Propriety
13	性自命出	Human Nature is Brought Forth by Decree
14	六德	The Six Virtues
15–18	語叢一、二、三、四	Thicket of Sayings Part 1, 2, 3 & 4

=== Tao Te Ching ===
There are three bundles of Guodian bamboo slips containing Tao Te Ching texts, namely bundles A, B, and C. Each bundle can be divided into three to five units. Below, corresponding chapter numbers in the received text of the Tao Te Ching are given for each of the Guodian bundles.

- Bundle A (甲) (39 slips)
  - Unit 1: 19, 66, 46 (end), 30, 15, 64 (end), 37, 63 (beginning & end), 2, 32
  - Unit 2: 25, 5 (middle)
  - Unit 3: 16 (beginning)
  - Unit 4: 64 (beginning), 56, 57
  - Unit 5: 55, 44, 40, 9
- Bundle B (乙) (18 slips)
  - Unit 1: 59, 48 (beginning), 20 (beginning), 13
  - Unit 2: 41
  - Unit 3: 52 (middle), 45, 54
- Bundle C (丙) (28 slips)
  - Units 1: 17, 18
  - Unit 2: 35
  - Unit 3: 31 (end)
  - Unit 4: 64 (end / part 2)
  - Unit 5: Taiyi Shengshui

The Guodian texts correspond to 31 of the chapters (ranging from chapters 2–66) in the received text. Chapters 70–81 in the received text of the Tao Te Ching were possibly not yet composed at the time the Guodian slips were copied.

Murphy (2006) suggests that the Guodian Tao Te Ching texts were selectively copied and thematically organized for the ruling class, perhaps as teaching materials. The Guodian texts focus more on politics and virtue. In contrast, the Mawangdui Tao Te Ching texts focus more on cosmology and metaphysics.

The Guodian texts contain many grammatical particles, such as 也 (yě), that are not present in the received text.

== See also ==
- Chu Silk Manuscript
- Mawangdui Silk Texts
- Shuanggudui
- Shuihudi Qin bamboo texts
- Taiyi Shengshui
- Tsinghua Slips
- Yinqueshan Han Slips
- Zhangjiashan Han bamboo texts
