= Yinqueshan Han Slips =

Collection of ancient Chinese writings from the Western Han dynasty

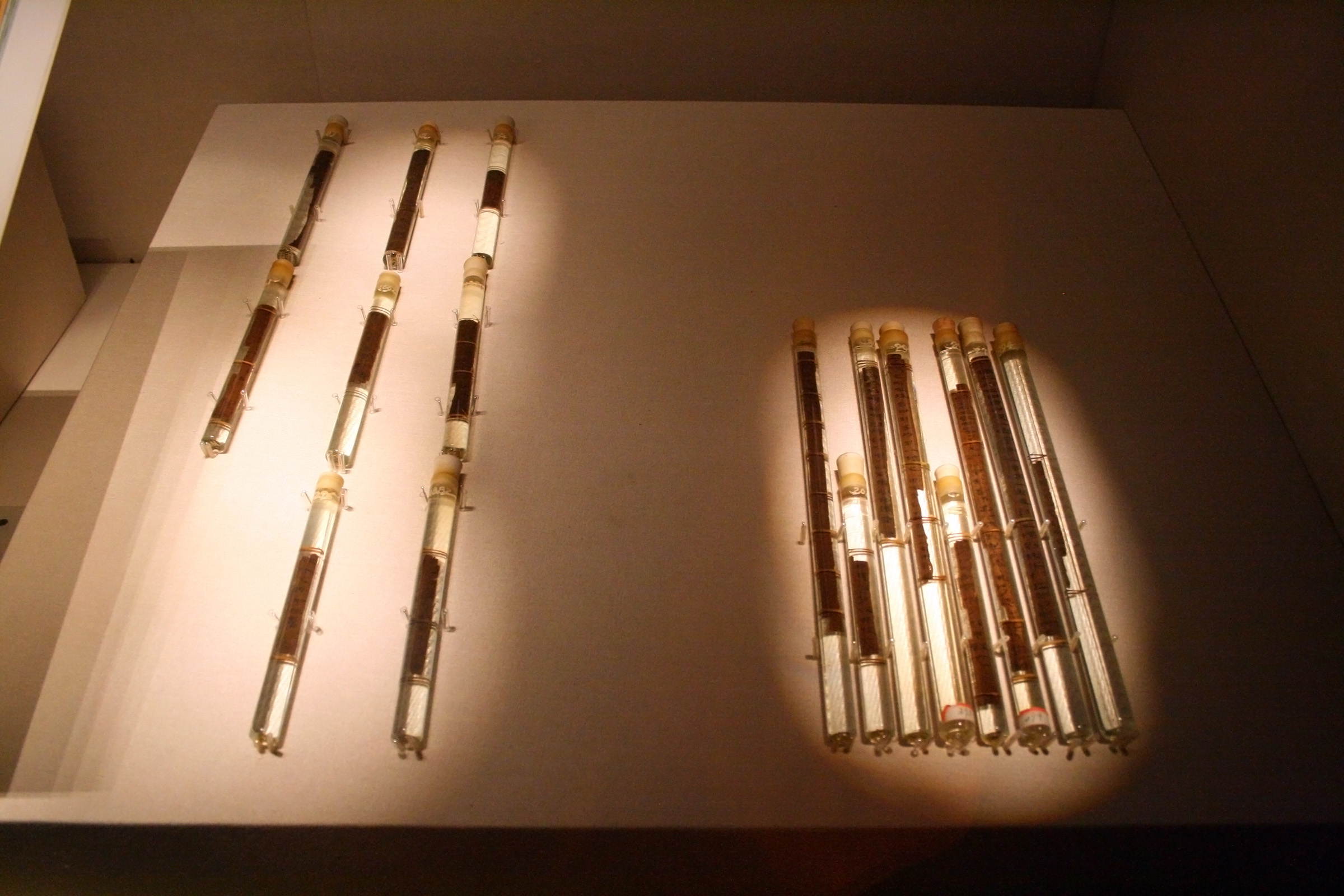
Fragments of The Art of War that are part of the Yinqueshan Han Slips.

The Yinqueshan Han Slips (simplified Chinese: 银雀山汉简; traditional Chinese: 銀雀山漢簡; pinyin: Yínquèshān Hànjiǎn) are ancient Chinese writing tablets from the Western Han dynasty, made of bamboo strips and discovered in 1972. The tablets contain many writings that were not previously known or shed new light on the ancient versions of classic texts.

The Yinqueshan Han Tombs were accidentally unearthed by construction workers on April 10, 1972. Archaeologists arrived a few days later to excavate the site. The bamboo slips were discovered in Tombs no. 1 and 2 at the foot of Yinqueshan (simplified Chinese: 银雀山; traditional Chinese: 銀雀山; pinyin: Yínquè Shān; lit. 'Silver Sparrow Mountain'), located southeast of the city of Linyi in the southernpart of Shandong province.

Discovered in Tomb no. 1 were 4942 bamboo strips covered in closely written words and included portions of known texts, as well as a number of previously unknown military and divination texts, some of which were shown to resemble chapters in Guanzi and Mozi. The occupant had been identified as a military officer bearing the surname Sima. Tomb no. 2, unearthed the same year, contained 32 strips of bamboo writings which clearly represent sections of a calendar for the year 134 BC.

The time of burial for both tombs had been dated to about 140 BC/134 BC and 118 BC, the texts having been written on the bamboo slips before then. After restoration and arrangement, the slips were organised into a sequential order of nine groups and 154 sections. The first group included 13 fragment chapters from Sunzi's The Art of War, and 5 undetermined chapters; the second group were the 16 chapters of Sun Bin's Art of War, which had been missing for at least 1,400 years; the third included the 7 original and lost chapters from the Six Strategies (before this significant find only the titles of the lost chapters were known); the fourth and fifth included 5 chapters from the Weiliaozi and 16 chapters from the Yanzi chunqiu; the rest of the groups included anonymous writings.

The slips are kept in the Yinqueshan Han Tombs Bamboo Slips Museum and in the Shandong Provincial Museum.

== Contents ==
Group	Chinese	Translation	##
01	孫子兵法 （十三篇殘文；佚文五篇）	Sun Tzu's Art of War (13 chapters and 5 attributed chapters)	001-018
02	孫臏兵法 （十六篇）	Sun Bin's Art of War (16 chapters)	019-034
03	尉繚子 （五篇）	Wei Liaozi (5 chapters)	035-039
04	晏子 （十六篇）	Yanzi (16 chapters)	040-055
05	六韜 （七篇殘文；傳本佚文七篇）	Six Strategies (7 original and attributed chapters)	056-069
06	守法、守令十三篇 （十篇）	Keeping Peace and Order (10 chapters)	070-079
07	論政論兵之類 （五十篇）	Discourses of Politics and Wars, etc. (50 chapters)	080-129
08	陰陽時令占候之類 （十二篇）	Yin Yang and Divination, etc. (12 chapters)	130-141
09	其他之類 （十三篇）	Other, etc. (13 chapters)	142-154

More than 38% of slips (1887 out of total 4942) were heavily damaged, which made the texts' reconstruction a very difficult task. Preliminarily, a part of the most famous texts of Yinqueshan, some 80 more were identified.

== See also ==
- Guodian Chu Slips
- Mawangdui Silk Texts
- Shuanggudui
- Shuihudi Qin bamboo texts
- Zhangjiashan Han bamboo texts
