= Shuihudi Qin bamboo texts =

Early Chinese texts written on bamboo slips

Shuihudi Qin bamboo textiles
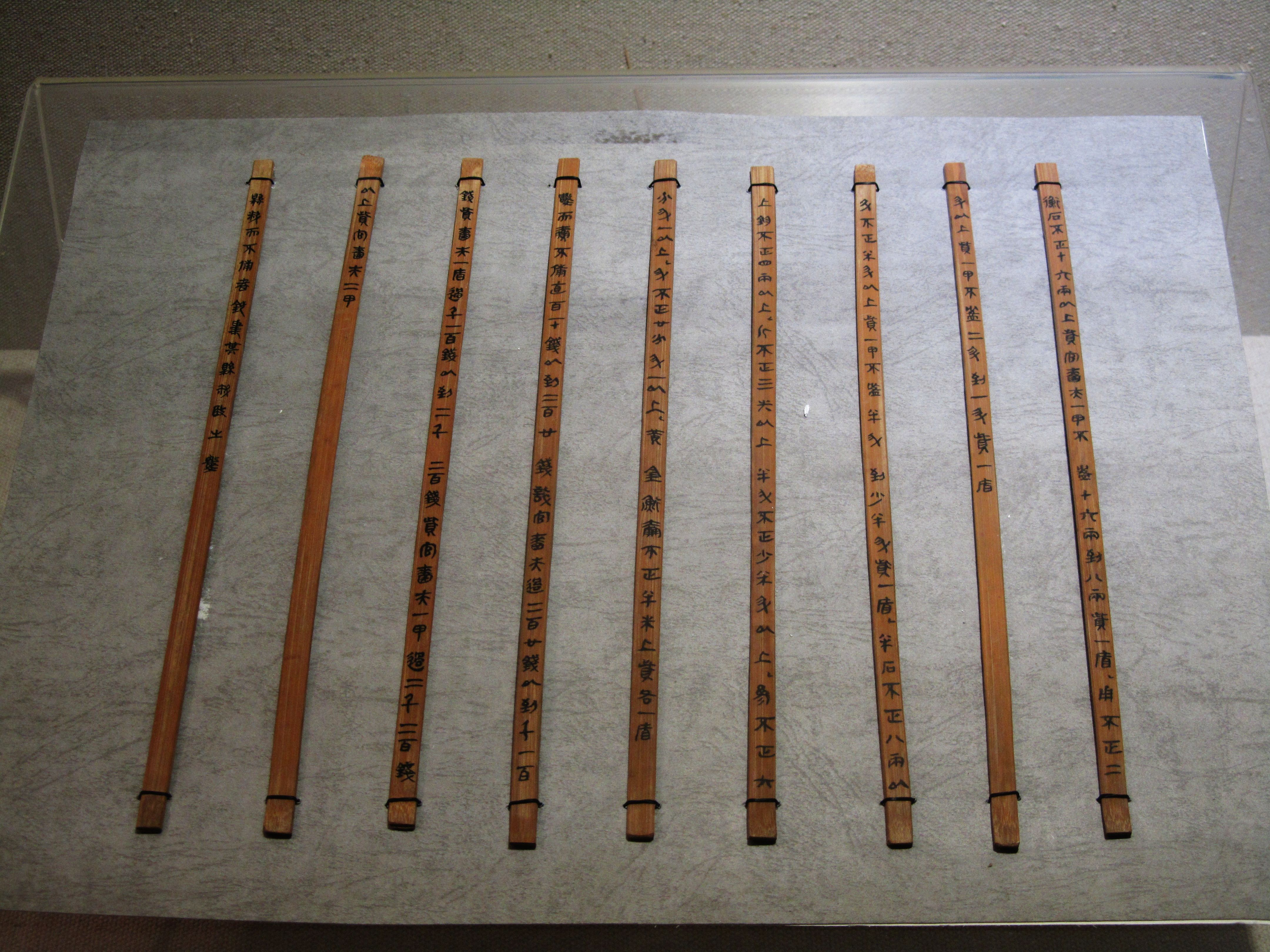
- Part of the Shuihudi Qin bamboo texts
- Created: c. 217 BC in Qin
- Discovered: December 1975; Xiaogan, Hubei, China
- Present location: Nantong, Jiangsu, China

The Shuihudi Qin bamboo texts (simplified Chinese: 睡虎地秦简; traditional Chinese: 睡虎地秦簡; pinyin: Shuìhǔdì Qín jiǎn) are a cache of early Chinese texts written on bamboo slips. Excavated in December 1975 from Tomb #11 at Shuìhǔdì (睡虎地) in Yunmeng County, Hubei, they were deposited c. 217 BCE and preserved a wide array of legal statutes, official documents, and practical manuals used within Qin administration.

Written by a Qin scribe, the texts on the roughly 1155 slips of bamboo record a range of Qin laws and public documents. Their contents have been since published in the book Shuìhǔdì Qínmù Zhújiǎn (睡虎地秦墓竹簡). The cache has been deemed one of the most valuable epigraphic sources yet uncovered for understanding the governmental, legal, and socioeconomic systems of the late Warring States period and the Qin period. Subsequently, the 2002 and 2005 discoveries of the Liye Qin Slips in Liye Ancient City, Hunan have been deemed to be of equal, if not greater, significance.

== Contents ==
=== Legal Statutes ===
Many slips in the cache record detailed statutes and regulations from Qin law. Among the most prominent are the Xiaolü (效律, "statutes concerning checking") and Yaolü (强律, "statutes on statute labor"), which define the legal responsibilities of officials and the punishments for administrative errors. For example, the Xiaolü lays out precise penalties for discrepancies in official accounting, including fines in armor or shields for errors exceeding set thresholds, demonstrating the high standards expected of bureaucratic staff.

The Yaolü includes stringent requirements for corvée labor: if construction work such as a city wall collapsed within a year, the supervising officials would be penalized, and the laborers ordered to rebuild it without the term counting toward their corvée duty. These provisions indicate a rigorous bureaucratic culture that linked legal liability with engineering performance.

The legal statutes suggest that previous understanding of Qin law exaggerated its brutality. The most severe punishment was decapitation, contrary to grisly depictions of Qin law by later generations. The law prescribed a high standard of uniformity and meticulous judicial procedures to be followed by officials when determining the nature of a killing. In one instance, to adjudicate a case of miscarriage of a pregnant woman after her fight with another woman, the judge was charged with "determining the age of the fetus and whether the fight had caused its death."

=== Administrative Manuals ===
The texts also contain guides for the daily operation of administrative offices. The Gongren Cheng (工人程, "Norms of Productivity for the Laborers") and Canglü (仓律, "Granary Statutes") are notable examples. These documents provided standardized metrics for assessing the productivity of laborers according to age, sex, and physical capacity, as well as regulated food rations based on social status including adult bondservants, female bondservants, and children. The precision of these norms, often involving complex fractions, attests to the advanced mathematical literacy required of Qin administrators.

=== Mathematical Practices ===
Important evidence on the development of mathematical thought in early China is also found within the slips. According to research by Zou Dahai, many legal and economic subjects rely on sophisticated methods of proportional allocation and fractional calculations. These include algorithms resembling those in the later "Nine Chapters on the Mathematical Procedures" (Jiuzhang Suanshu) that deal with matters of distribution, construction and levy transportation.

Such statutes required local officials to calculate the amount of food required for various-sized populations and to adjust provisions dynamically according to shortfalls, time, and distance. In contexts such as civil engineering projects, officials had to match the volume of earth moved, transported, and tamped, requiring volume calculations and logistical planning reminiscent of mathematical modeling. These activities suggest that the mathematical knowledge found in later works like the "Nine Chapters" had already been developed and applied in administrative contexts prior to the Qin unification.

== See also ==
- Gao Heng (legal scholar)
- Guodian Chu Slips
- Shuanggudui
- Yinqueshan Han Slips
- Zhangjiashan Han bamboo texts
- Liye Qin Slips
- Vindolanda tablets

== Bibliography ==
- Hulsewé, A.F.P. Remnants of Ch'in Law: An Annotated Translation of the Ch'in Legal and Administrative Rules of the 3rd Century BC. (Sinica Leidensia, No 17) Leiden: Brill, 1985.
