= Zhangjiashan Han bamboo texts =

The Zhangjiashan Han bamboo texts are ancient Han dynasty Chinese written works dated 196–186 BC. They were discovered in 1983 by archaeologists excavating tomb no. 247 at Mount Zhangjia (張家山) of Jiangling County, Hubei Province (near modern Jingzhou). The tomb was built for an early Western Han era official who had died in 186 BC. The texts were written on traditional bamboo slips connected by cords into rolled scrolls. The written works included legal case precedents, literature on medicine including Book on Vessels, mathematics, military strategy, and a calendar with dates ranging from 202 BC to 186 BC.

The mathematical work found within the tomb, the Book on Numbers and Computation, rapidly advanced the state of the field of ancient Chinese mathematics studies, clarifying the obscure passages of the Nine Chapters on the Mathematical Art. Although its date roughly corresponds with the tomb occupant's death, one of the legal cases discussed in the work on law was dated 246 BC, with some even older legal precedents of the State of Qin mixed in, according to Mark Csikszentmihalyi. The most recent legal case in that work was dated 196 BC.

== See also ==
- Guodian Chu Slips
- History of the Han dynasty
- Mawangdui Silk Texts
- Shuanggudui
- Shuihudi Qin bamboo texts
- Yinqueshan Han Slips
