= Ma Chengyuan =

Chinese archaeologist (1927–2004)

Ma Chengyuan 马承源
- Ma Chengyuan in front of the Jin Hou Su bianzhong
- Born: 3 November 1927; Shanghai, China
- Died: 25 September 2004 (aged 76); Shanghai
- Education: Daxia University
- Known for: Authority on Chinese bronzes
- Spouse: Chen Zhiwu
- Awards: John D. Rockefeller III Award; Legion of Honour
- Scientific career
- Fields: Archaeology
- Workplaces: Shanghai Museum

Chinese name
- Traditional Chinese: 馬承源
- Simplified Chinese: 马承源
Transcriptions
Standard Mandarin
- Hanyu Pinyin: Mǎ Chéngyuán
- Wade–Giles: Ma Ch'eng-yüan

Ma Chengyuan (Chinese: 马承源; 3 November 1927 – 25 September 2004) was a Chinese archaeologist, epigrapher, and president of the Shanghai Museum. He was credited with saving priceless artifacts from destruction during the Cultural Revolution, and was instrumental in raising funds and support for the rebuilding of the Shanghai Museum. He was a recipient of the John D. Rockefeller III Award, and was awarded the Legion of Honour by French President Jacques Chirac.

Ma was an authority on ancient Chinese bronzes and published more than 80 books and academic papers, including a 16-volume encyclopedia of the bronzes. He was responsible for recovering ancient relics including the Jin Hou Su Bianzhong and Warring States period bamboo strips, which are now considered China's national treasures.

== Early life and career ==
Ma Chengyuan was born in 1927 in Shanghai. In 1946, he joined an underground cell of the Chinese Communist Party, and graduated from the history department of Daxia University in Shanghai, a predecessor of East China Normal University, in 1951. He worked for the education department of the Shanghai Municipal Government before joining the Shanghai Museum in 1954. Ma was originally assigned to be a manager and Communist Party secretary of the museum, but he resigned from his political positions in 1956 to focus on academic work, and later became director of the bronze research department.

== Cultural Revolution ==
As the Cultural Revolution erupted in 1966, Chairman of the Chinese Communist Party Mao Zedong called for the destruction of the Four Olds, and Red Guards rampaged through people's homes to destroy relics of pre-Communist China. Desperate Shanghai collectors sought protection of their antiques at the Shanghai Museum, and Ma slept in his office to take phone calls and to dispatch museum employees around the clock.

Ma initially kept the Red Guards out of the museum by organizing his employees as fake Red Guards, and protected the relics by painting Maoist slogans over the display cases. However, some of his own staff were soon swept by the revolutionary fervour. An extremist faction of museum workers seized Ma along with other senior officials, and imprisoned him in a storage room for nine months. Trying to coerce the officials into confessing that they were "traitors", the extremists repeatedly lifted them up and dropped them onto the marble floor. Several of Ma's colleagues died. Ma survived the torture, and was sent to a labour camp in Hubei province for five years.

In 1972, after American President Richard Nixon's historic visit to China, Ma was brought back to Shanghai to organize an exhibition of archaeological treasures to tour the United States. The Cultural Revolution ended after the death of Mao in 1976.

== Rebuilding the Shanghai Museum ==
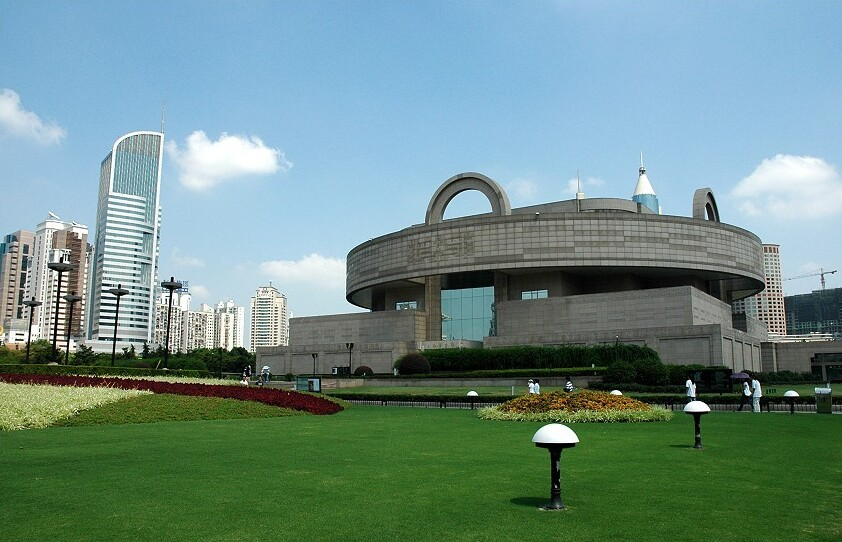
Shanghai Museum

In 1985, Ma was appointed the Director of the Shanghai Museum. When the museum was omitted from Shanghai's five-year reconstruction plan in 1992, Ma lobbied Mayor Huang Ju for its rebuilding. After seeing the dilapidated rooms of the Zhonghui Building where the museum was then housed, Huang agreed to allocate a prime site on the People's Square, but the museum had to raise its own building funds. Ma raised US$25 million by leasing the old building to a Hong Kong developer. He also made many trips abroad to solicit donations, mainly from the Shanghai diaspora who had fled to Hong Kong after the Communist revolution, raising another US$10 million. The money still ran short, but he eventually persuaded the city government to allocate another CN¥140 million to complete the building.

The museum reopened on 12 October 1996 to wide acclaim, and Ma gained international fame. He won the John D. Rockefeller III Award from the Asian Cultural Council in that year. French President Jacques Chirac awarded Ma the Legion of Honour in 1998, and invited Ma to accompany Chinese President Jiang Zemin to a private dinner with him in France. The South China Morning Post of Hong Kong commented that Ma seemed to have "willed [the Shanghai Museum] into existence."

== Recovering cultural relics ==
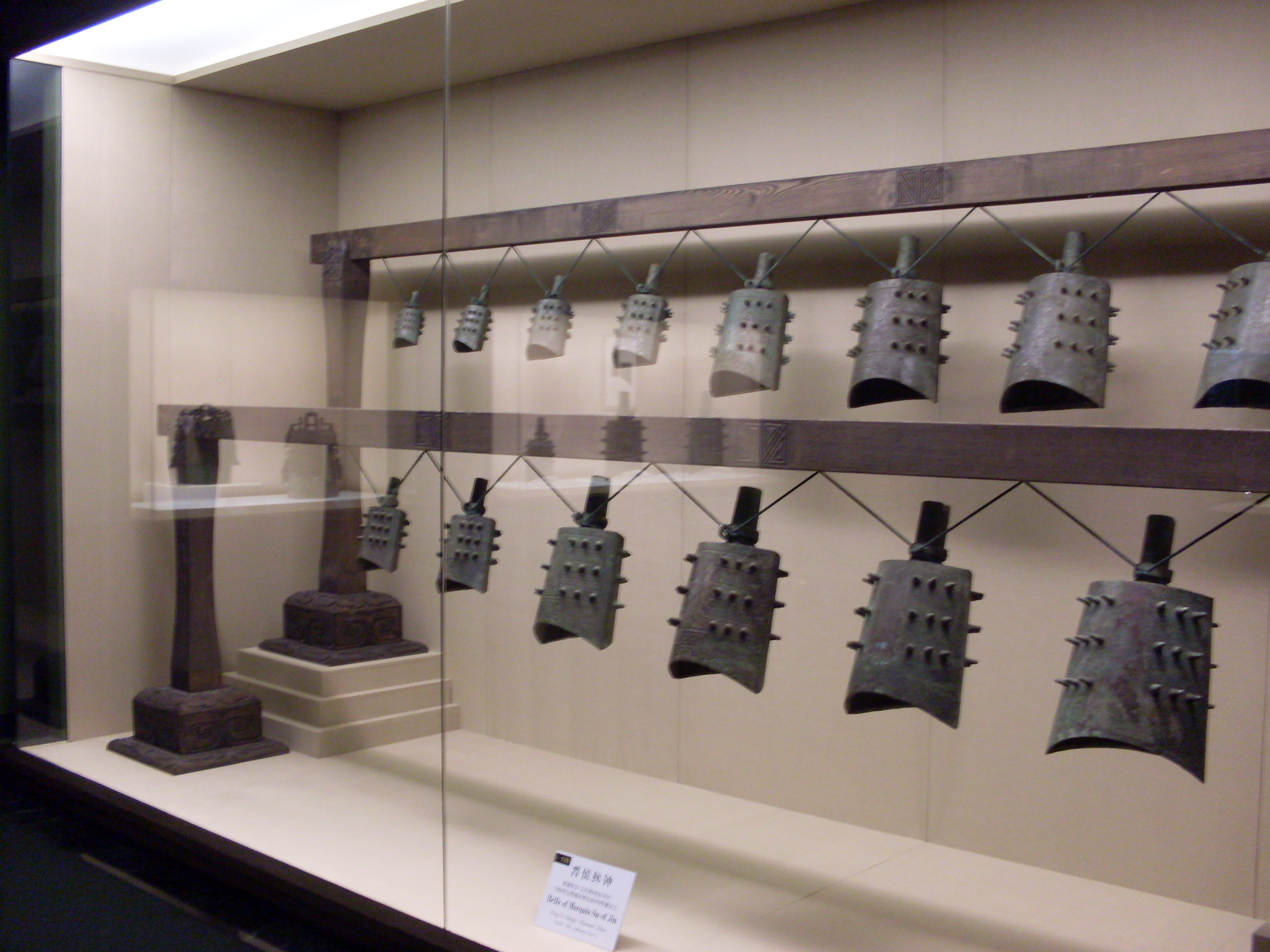
The Jin Hou Su bianzhong, which had been looted and smuggled out of China, were found and bought back by Ma Chengyuan

After the opening up of China from the 1980s, tomb robbery was rampant and many artifacts were looted and smuggled across the border to Hong Kong. Ma Chengyuan was active in recovering many of the items from the Hong Kong antique market. In 1992, he purchased the 3,000-year-old Jin Hou Su bianzhong (晉侯穌鐘), which were listed by the Chinese government as one of the first 64 national treasures forbidden to be exhibited abroad in 2002.

In 1994, Ma recovered more than 1,200 Warring States period bamboo slips from the Kingdom of Chu, now known as the Shanghai Museum bamboo slips. Several ancient texts were written on the strips, including the Kongzi Shi Lun, a previously unknown commentary on the Confucian Classic of Poetry attributed to Confucius himself. The discovery caused a sensation in academia, and the texts have been the subject of intense studies by numerous scholars, including Ma himself.

== Academics ==
Ma was an authority on ancient Chinese bronzes and published more than 80 books and academic papers. His book Ancient Chinese Bronzes, translated into English and published by Oxford University Press (ISBN 9780195837957), is highly influential and widely used as a university textbook. His 16-volume encyclopedia, Zhongguo Qingtongqi Quanji (中国青铜器全集, "Complete Compilation of Chinese Bronzes"), is the most comprehensive book on Chinese bronzes ever published. He was also the chief editor of Shanghai Bowuguan cang Zhanguo Chu zhushu (上海博物馆藏战国楚竹书, "Warring States Chu Bamboo Books of the Shanghai Museum"), a groundbreaking research on the Warring States bamboo strips recovered by Ma himself. Other books he published include Zhongguo Qingtongqi Yanjiu (中国青铜器研究, "Research on Chinese Bronzes"), a collection of 40 of his academic papers, Yangshao Wenhua de Caitao (仰韶文化的彩陶, "Painted Ceramics of the Yangshao Culture"), and Shang Zhou Qingtongqi Mingwen Xuan (商周青铜器铭文选, "Selected Bronze Inscriptions of the Shang and Zhou Dynasties").

In addition to his main position as Director of the Shanghai Museum, Ma also taught as a part-time professor at Shanghai's East China Normal University and Fudan University. He was also a council member of the Archaeological Society of China, and vice chairman of the China Museum Society.

== Retirement and suicide ==
Ma retired in 1999, but still served as an advisor to the Shanghai Museum. However, he had conflicts with the new management which became increasingly bitter. He was accused of misusing US$250,000 donated by a Chinese-American collector, but an investigation cleared him of wrongdoing. There were also rumours that some of the ancient bamboo strips he purchased for a high sum from public funds were fake.

In his final years, Ma allegedly experienced high blood pressure and kidney problems, yet followed his doctor's advice meticulously. It is also said that he had depression, and committed suicide on 25 September 2004. Official newspapers in China reported his death but did not initially disclose the cause. When President Chirac organized his visit to Shanghai in October, he insisted on meeting with Ma, without realizing that he had died.

== Personal life ==
Ma Chengyuan was married to Chen Zhiwu. They had a daughter, who lived in Australia. Before Ma's death, he invited his daughter to spend two weeks with him in Shanghai. He committed suicide three days after his daughter returned to Australia.
