= Martin Kern =

Martin Kern may refer to:

- Martin Kern (footballer) (born 2006), Hungarian footballer
- Martin Kern (sinologist) (fl. 1980s–2020s), German-American sinologist

== See also ==
- Martin Kearns (1977–2015), English death metal drummer
