= Changtaiguan Bamboo Slips =

4th century BCE bamboo slips

The Changtaiguan Bamboo Slips (Chinese: 长台关楚简) are ancient bamboo slips discovered in 1956 in Tomb No. 1 at Changtaiguan, Xinyang, Henan Province, China. They are a collection of 148 bamboo strips from the Warring States period, specifically the mid-4th century BCE. Found in a Chu tomb, these slips are among the earliest known Warring States texts, offering insights into Chu’s cultural life.

The Changtaiguan slips are divided into two groups (of which 119 fragmented and 29 arr intact) and contain about 470 legible characters written in ink on bamboo, and bound by silk threads. Their content blends Mohist and Confucian ideas, discussing governance, morality, and social order, with possible references to lost Mozi chapters or figures like Duke Zhou. The distinctive Chu script, with tall, meticulous characters, connects them to later finds such as the Guodian and the Shanghai Museum bamboo slips.

Initially reported in 1957, the slips have been studied extensively, with key publications in 1986, 1995, and 2004, using infrared photography for better transcription. Scholars like Li Xueqin and Liao Mingchun debate their philosophical ties, highlighting their role in understanding Warring States intellectual history. The discovery was a milestone, sparking interest in ancient Chinese texts and regional Chu culture.
