= List of ancient Chinese manuscripts =

This page lists discoveries of ancient Chinese manuscripts, and the focus is on bamboo and silk manuscripts, with the timeframe from Eastern Zhou dynasty to Eastern Han dynasty. The table complements the Manuscript Database from the University of Heidelberg, which currently covers discoveries to 2015 (the table supplies discoveries that predate 2015 and that are not listed in the database). It aims to provide an overview and references to an Anglophone audience of major discoveries in the last 10 years.

== Table listing discoveries of ancient Chinese manuscripts ==
Excavation year (begins)	Name	Location / Period	Materiality of Written Artifacts	#	Content	Report	Year of publication	Notes
1992	老河口安崗竹簡M1, M2	Late Warring States	Bamboo Strips	21	tomb inventory	《湖北老河口安崗楚墓竹簡概述》，《文物》2017.7	2017	Strips are very damaged.
2009	严仓 1 号	Chu State, Warring States	Bamboo Strips	650	divination; prayers	文物 2021.04	2021	Texts are dated between 307-299 BCE.
2012	高龍東漢墓	Emperor Ling of Han 漢靈帝	steles	2		文物 2023.08	2023	
2012	山西太原 complex	Han Dynasties	wall inscription	1		文物 2015.12	2015	
2014	湘鄉	Chu State, Warring States	?	ca. 900	Administrative Documents	Not yet published		
2019	胡家草場漢簡	Han Wu Di	Bamboo Strips	4642	calendars; medicine; legal texts; daybooks; registers	荆州博物館:《湖北荆州市胡家草場墓地M12發出簡報》，《考古》2020年第2期，3—20	2020	The corpus also includes 4 wooden tablets. The content includes records of events that took place during the Qin dynasty.
2019	龍會河	Chu State, Warring States	Bamboo Strips	324	military; writings			
2019	Wangjiazui 王家嘴	Chu State, Warring States	Bamboo Strips	800 (3,200 fragments)	Philosophical writings; poetry.	Jingzhou boquguan 荊州博物館. “湖北荊州王家嘴798號楚墓地法掘簡報” 江汉考古 2, no. 185 (2023): 2–14	2023	
2019	Zaozhi 棗紙	Chu State, Warring State	Bamboo Strips	704	Philosophical and historical narratives. See below.	Current introduction by Zhao 2020		From tomb 46 the 造紙廠 section of the Zaolinpu 棗林鋪 cemetery, Hubei
2019	唐維寺 M126	Chu State, mid to late Warring States	Bamboo Strips	8	Divination to inquire about illness	Current introduction by Zhao 2020		From the Zaolinpu Cemetery
2019	Xiongjiawan 熊家灣 M43	Chu State, mid to late Warring States	Bamboo Strips	2	Divination to inquire about illness	Current introduction by Zhao 2020		From the Zaolinpu Cemetery
2019	Pengjiawan 彭家灣 M183	Chu State, mid to late Warring States	Bamboo Strips	12	Divination to inquire about illness	Current introduction by Zhao 2020		From the Zaolinpu Cemetery
2020	Hebosuo 河泊所	Western and Eastern Han	Bamboo strips; wooden tablets	~4K	Administrative; chapters from the Analects; legal texts.	Archaeology 考古 2023.7	2023	
2023	Qinjiazui 秦家嘴	Chu State, Warring States	Bamboo Strips	1,500	Introductions to the discovery talks of 5 genres of writings: 1) 六艺類 six arts 2) masters' writings 諸子類 3) writings in the style of ci 辭 and fu 賦 ("rhapsody") 4) writings on numbers and divinations, 术数 5) writings on "Recipes and Methods” 方技			

== Overview of contents ==
=== Wangjiazui strips ===
- One manuscript reproduces the “Guo feng” 國風 section of the Book of Odes;
- A manuscript titled by the editors *Confucius said 孔子曰 collects sayings attributed to Confucius.
- A text is an annotation of what appears to be a music score.

=== Zaozhi strips ===
- One manuscript is "Words from the Shi and the Shu" 詩書之言, a text that collects citations of texts known to use from the 詩經, 尚書, and 墨子.
- A manuscript of 99 strips has been titled *Duke Huan of Qi returns to Qi from Ju 《齊桓公自莒返于齊》. This narrative was previously attested in the Speeches of the States 國語 and Guanzi 管子.
- A manuscript titled 《吳王夫差起師伐越》, which parallels the Tsinghua manuscript 《越公其事》, hence confirming the authenticity of the latter corpus, which has been unfortunately looted and purchased by Tsinghua University in 2008 to preserve it. Li Hong 李泓 has discussed a few differences in terminology.

== See also ==
- Bamboo and wooden slips
