= Bamboo and wooden slips =

Classical Chinese writing medium

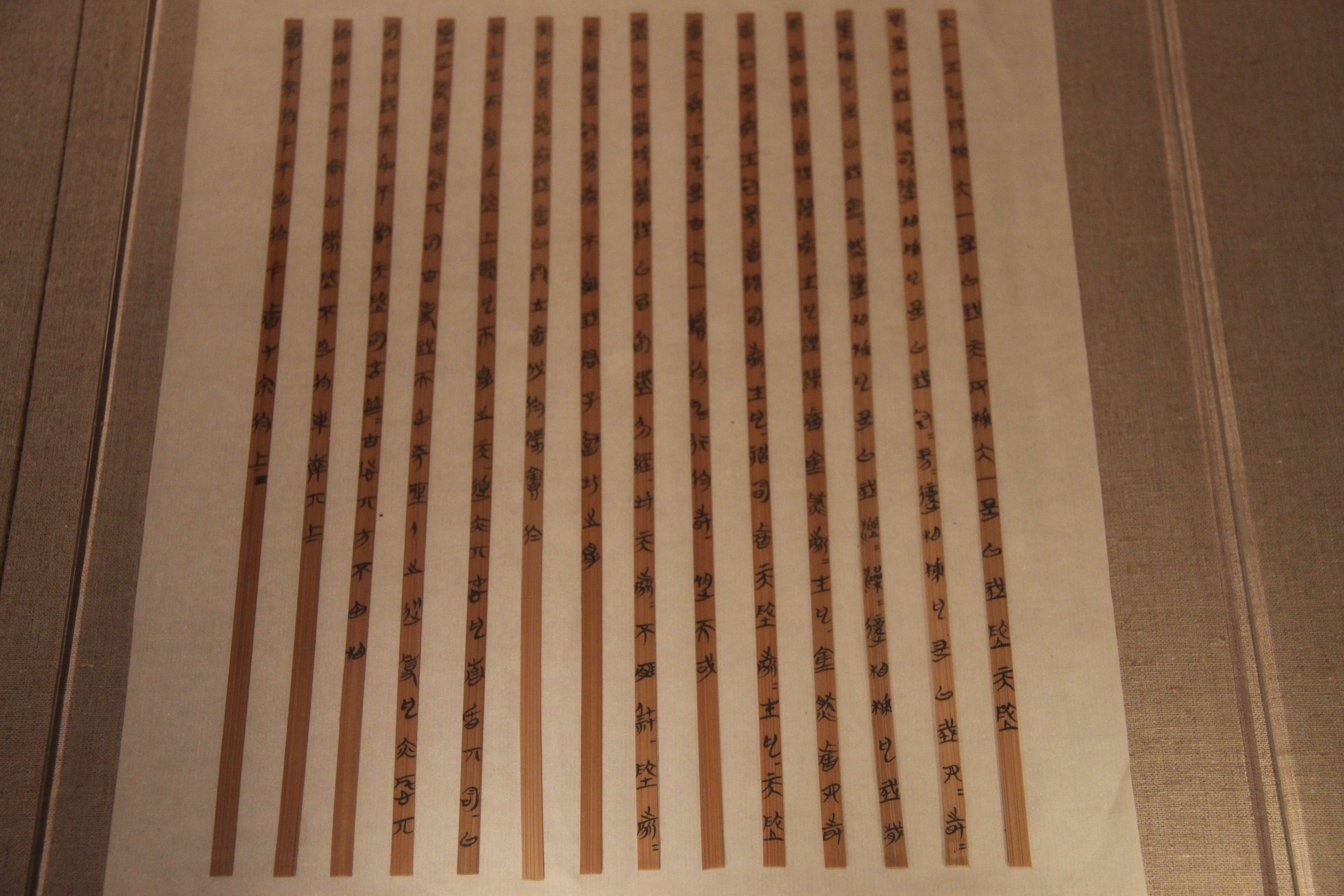
- Replica of bamboo slips from the Warring States period
- Traditional Chinese: 簡牘
- Simplified Chinese: 简牍
- Literal meaning: bamboo slips [and] wooden tablets
Transcriptions
Standard Mandarin
- Hanyu Pinyin: jiǎndú
- Wade–Giles: chien^{3}-tu^{2}
- IPA: [tɕjɛ̀n.tǔ]
Wu
- Wugniu: ci^{3} doq^{8}
- IPA: Shanghainese: [tɕi˧ doʔ˦]
Yue: Cantonese
- Yale Romanization: gáan-duhk
- Jyutping: gaan^{2} duk^{6}
- IPA: [kan˧˥.tʊk̚˨]
Southern Min
- Tâi-lô: kán-to̍k
Middle Chinese
- Middle Chinese: keanX duwk (Baxter)

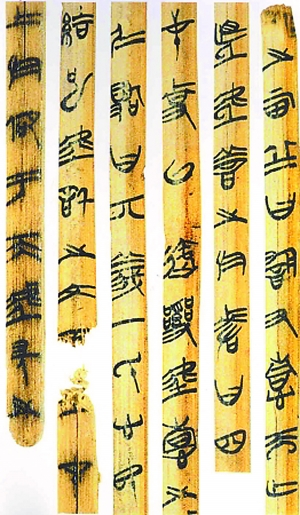
A single slip (shown in six parts) from the Shanghai Museum bamboo slips (c. 300 BC), recording part of a commentary on the Classic of Poetry

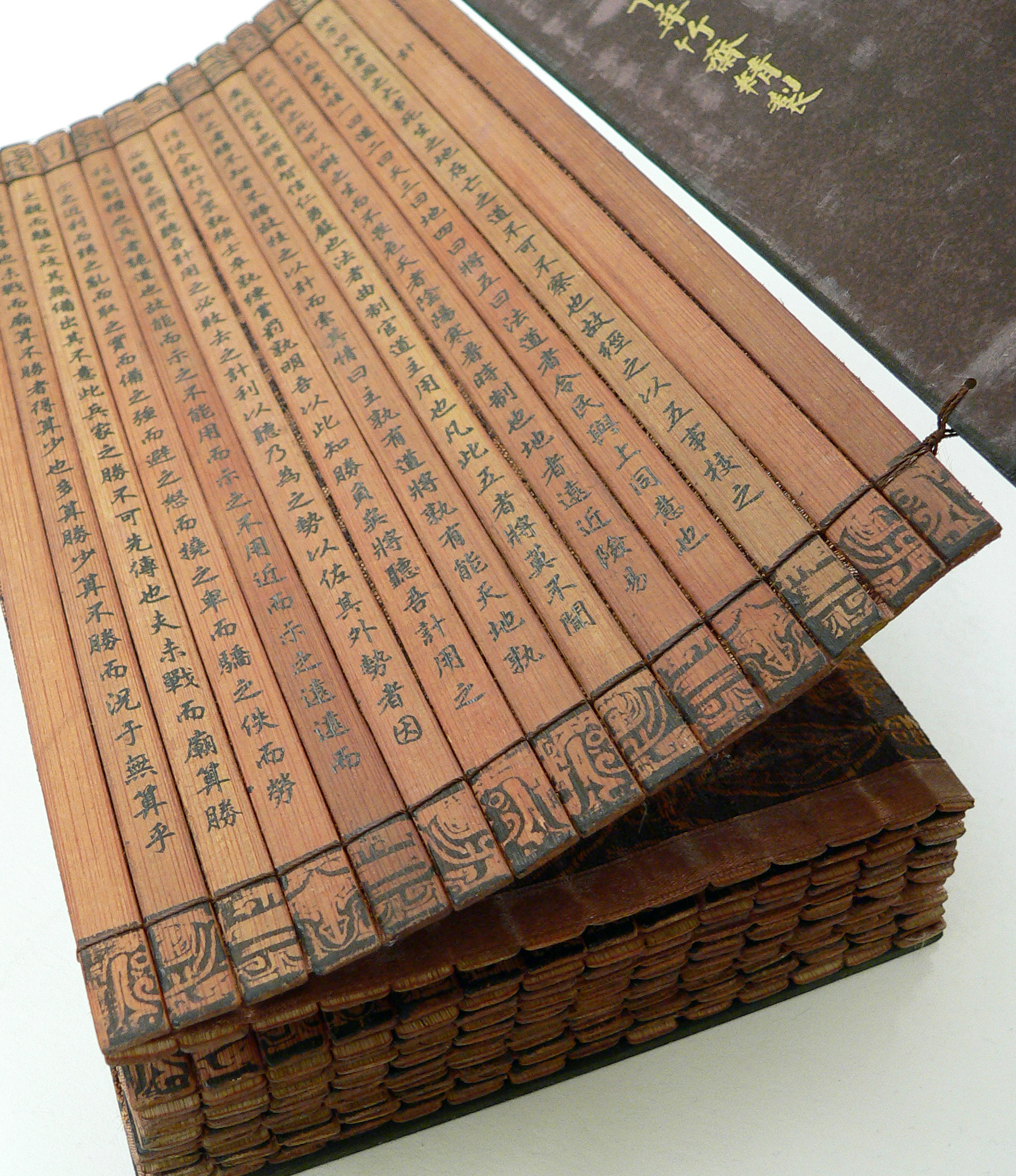
An 18th-century edition of The Art of War made with bamboo strips

Bamboo and wooden slips (traditional Chinese: 簡牘; simplified Chinese: 简牍; pinyin: jiǎndú) are long, narrow strips of wood or bamboo, each typically holding a single column of several dozen brush-written characters. They were the main media for writing documents in China before the widespread introduction of paper during the first two centuries AD. (Silk was occasionally used, for example in the Chu Silk Manuscript, but was prohibitively expensive for most documents.)

Based on the length and width dimensions, they were classified into different categories: long and narrow strips were called “jian”, rectangular and wider ones were called “ du”, those with multiple sides were called “gu” (also known as “liang”, “jie”, “fengjian”, “xiaoyi”). In terms of materials, slips in the southern regions were mostly made of bamboo, while those in the northern regions were generally made of wood.

Strips of wood or bamboo vary primarily in length. For bamboo manuscripts, the strips can go from as short as 9 cm to as long as 45 cm. The width is more consistently around 0.6 cm. The writing proceeds vertically, from right to left. Strips were bound together with hemp, silk, or leather and used to make a kind of folding book, called jiǎncè or jiǎndú. The binding process usually takes place after the writing, with a few exceptions.

The earliest surviving examples of wood and bamboo slips date from the 5th century BC during the Warring States period. However, references in earlier texts surviving on other media make it clear that some precursor of these Warring States period bamboo slips was in use as early as the late Shang period (from about 1250 BC). Bamboo and wooden strips were the standard writing material during the Han dynasty and excavated examples have been found in abundance. Subsequently, the improvements made to paper by Cai Lun during the Han dynasty began to displace bamboo and wooden strips from mainstream uses, and by the 4th century AD bamboo had been largely abandoned as a medium for writing in China.

The custom of interring books made of the durable bamboo strips in royal tombs has preserved many works in their original form through the centuries. An important early find was the Jizhong discovery in 279 AD in a tomb of a king of Wei, though the original recovered strips have since disappeared. Several caches of great importance have been found in recent years.

== Major collections ==
Collection		Province	Found	Period
Old Juyan slips		Inner Mongolia Autonomous Region	1930	Western Han
Changtai Guan slips		Henan	1956	Warring States
Mozuizi	磨嘴子	Gansu	1959	Eastern Han
Yinqueshan Han Slips		Shandong	1972	Western Han
New Juyan slips		Gansu	1972–74	Western Han
Ding County slips		Hebei	1973	Western Han
Shuihudi Qin bamboo texts		Hubei	1975	Qin
Fuyang Han slips		Anhui	1977	Western Han
Shuanggudui		Anhui	1977	Western Han
Shangsun Jiazhai Han slips		Qinghai	1978	Han
Zhangjiashan Han bamboo texts		Hubei	1983	Western Han
Fangmatan		Gansu	1986	late Warring States (Qin)
Wangjiatai Qin Slips		Hubei	March 1993	Qin
Guodian Chu Slips		Hubei	1993	mid to late Warring States
Shanghai Museum bamboo slips		Hubei	1994	mid to late Warring States
Zoumalou bamboo slips		Hunan	1996	Three Kingdoms (Eastern Wu)
Yinwan	尹灣	Jiangsu	1997	Western Han
Chinese University of Hong Kong slips			2001	Han/Eastern Jin
Qin Slips of Liye		Hunan	2002	Qin dynasty
Tsinghua Bamboo Slips		Hunan or Hubei?	2008	mid to late Warring States
Xiangxiang	湘鄉	Hunan	2014	Mid Warring States
Anhui University Corpus		Hunan or Hubei?	2015	mid to late Warring States
Hujia Caochang	胡家草場	Hubei	2019	Han
Wangjiazui	王家嘴	Hubei	2023	mid to late Warring States
Zaozhi strips	棗紙簡	Hubei	2019–20	mid to late Warring States
Qinjiazui	秦家嘴	Hubei	2023	mid to late Warring States
Hebosuo Slips	河泊所	Yunnan	2023	Han

In 1930, the Sino-Swedish Expedition excavated ten sites in the Juyan Lake Basin and unearthed a total of 10,200 wooden slips dating to the Western Han, a cache that came to be known as the "old Juyan texts". In 1937, after the Second Sino-Japanese War began, Chung-Chang Shen transported these wooden slips from Beijing to the University of Hong Kong. Another 20,237 slips were excavated between 1972 and 1976 by the Juyan Archaeological Team, Gansu. These slips are held by the Provincial Museum of Gansu and came to be known as the "new Juyan texts".

The Shanghai Museum corpus was purchased in Hong Kong the year after the Guodian tomb was excavated, and is believed to have been taken by graverobbers from a tomb in the same area. The Tsinghua collection was donated by an alumnus who purchased it through auction, with no indication of its origin. The Anhui University corpus was also purchased by Anhui University after the strips surfaced in the antiquity market. The others were archaeologically excavated.

== Accoutrements ==
One accoutrement used when writing on bamboo slips was a small knife which would be used to scrape away mistakes and make amendments. Decorated knives became a symbol of office for some officials indicating their power to amend and change records and edicts.

== See also ==
- Bamboo Annals
- Bamboo tally
- Changsha Jiandu Museum
- Chu Silk Manuscript
- List of ancient Chinese manuscripts
- Mawangdui Silk Texts
- Oracle bone
- Mokkan, wooden tablets used as writing media in Japan and Korea
