= Zoumalou bamboo slips =

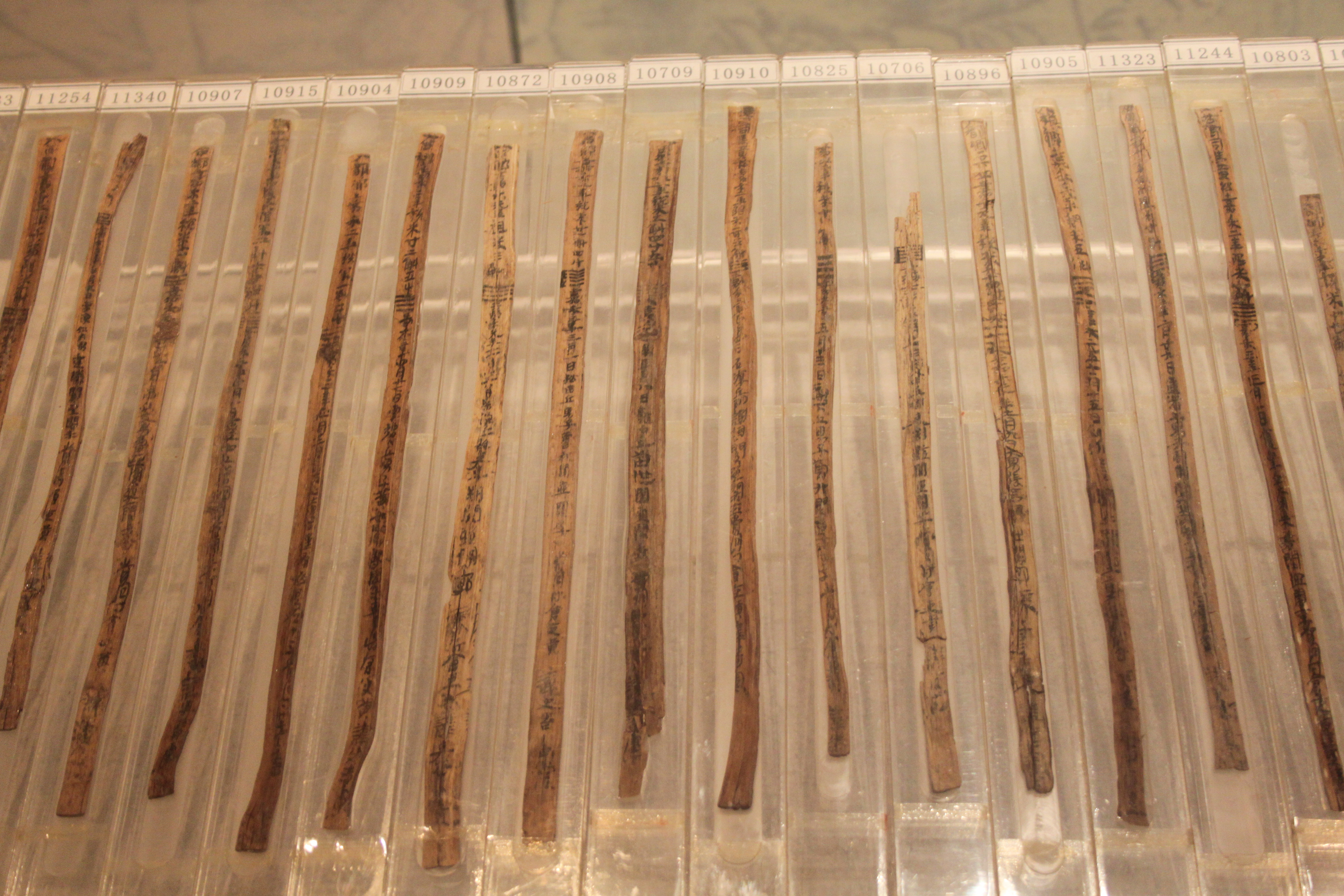
Bamboo slips containing tax and levy records from the Zoumalou cache, Changsha Jiandu Museum

Zoumalou bamboo slips (simplified Chinese: 走马楼简牍; traditional Chinese: 走馬樓簡牘; pinyin: zǒumǎlóu jiǎndú) refers to cultural relics that were unearthed at Zoumalou, the urban central area of Changsha, Hunan, China in 1996. The discovery was one of the most important archaeological finds in China during the 1990s. All the historical artifacts from Zoumalou are kept at the Changsha Jiandu Museum. The important archaeological site of Mawangdui is also located in Changsha.

Zoumalou (走马搂) is located on the southeastern corner at the crossroad of Huangxing and Wuyi Road. In October 1996, at the construction site for the Japanese department store Heiwado (平和堂) more than 140,000 pieces of bamboo and wooden slips were unearthed. The historical relics are bamboo slips (竹简), wooden slips (木简), wooden tablets (木牍), hand slip scripts (签牌) and seal slips (封检); they are documents which were mainly used to record administration and judicatory conditions in Eastern Wu of the Three Kingdoms period (220–280 AD). Because of this, the wooden and bamboo slips were also named Zoumalou Wu bamboo slips (走马楼吴简). The quantity of bamboo and wooden slips found numbered more than all of those previously discovered in China. This was the most important discovery of Chinese historical archives in the 20th century along with the Oracle bone script, the Dunhuang manuscripts and the discovery series of bamboo and wooden slips in the northwest. The Changsha Jiandu Museum was established in 2002. From their discovery in 1996, to the final clean up in 2015, archaeologists spent 19 years completing the arrangement of the cultural relics.

From 1996 to 2015, there were three other similar discoveries near or at Zoumalou. In 2003, more than twenty thousand bamboo slips were discovered at Zoumalou. These slips belonged to the Western Han period (202 BC – 8 AD). In 2004, 206 bamboo slips were discovered, with characters at Dongpailou (东牌楼), that belonged to the Eastern Han period (25–220 AD). On June 22, 2010, thousands of bamboo slips were found in an ancient well uncovered at a construction site at the southeast in the interchange of Wuyi road and Zoumalou lane, where the Metro Line 2 Wuyi Square station is located. It was determined that the bamboo slips belonged to the Eastern Han period.
