= Changsha Jiandu Museum =

Museum in Changsha, China

- 长沙简牍博物馆
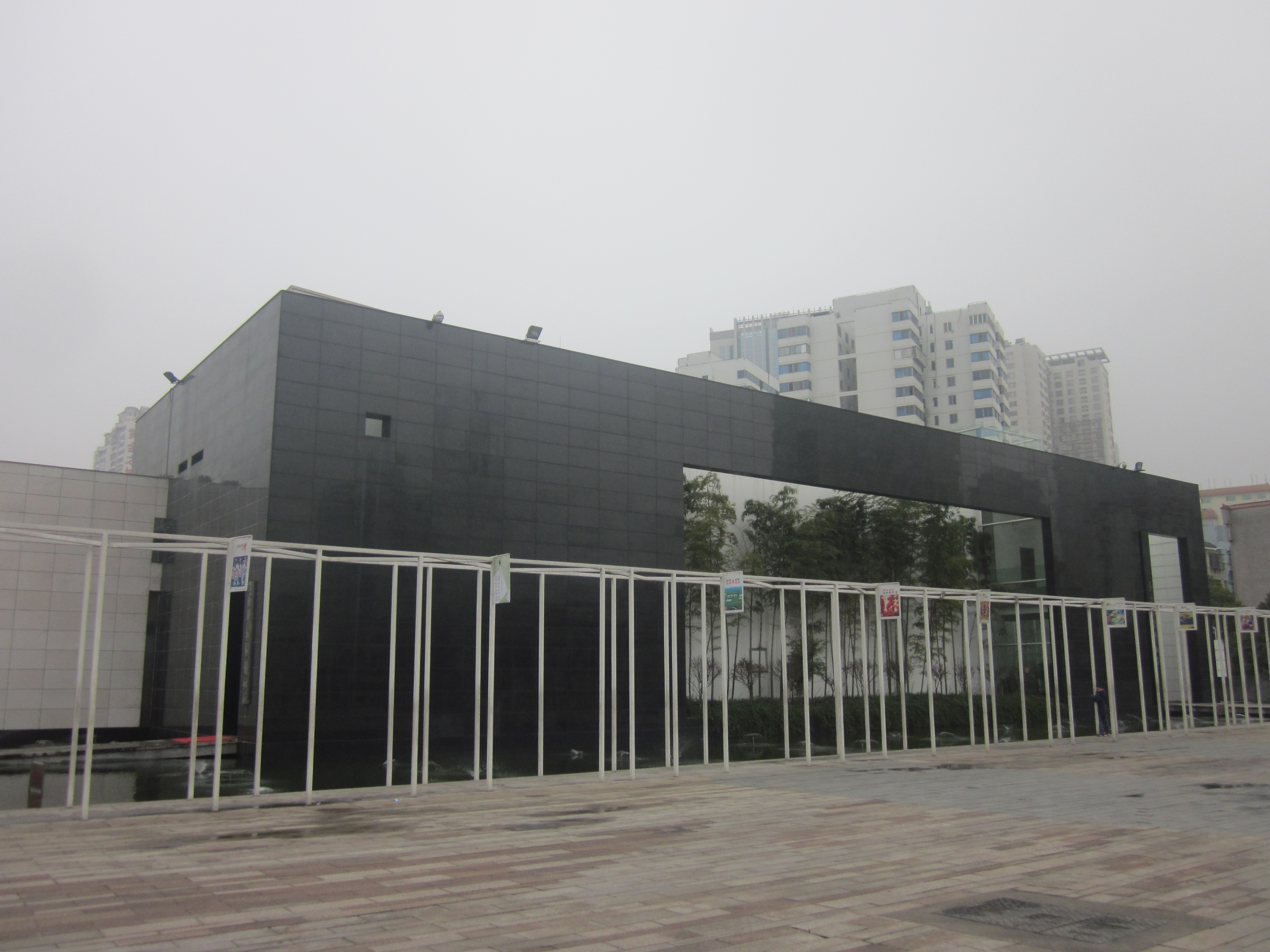

- Location within Hunan
- Established: 16 November 2002
- Location: Tianxin District, Changsha, Hunan, China
- Coordinates: 28°11′25″N 112°59′21″E
- Collections: Kingdom of Wu Annals, Bamboo scripts of Western Han, Bamboo scripts and cultural relics of Yuyang Tomb,
- Founder: Changsha government
- President: Li Equan (李鄂权)
- Website: www.chinajiandu.cn

The Changsha Jiandu Museum (simplified Chinese: 长沙简牍博物馆; traditional Chinese: 長沙簡牘博物館; pinyin: Chángshā Jiǎndú Bówùguǎn) is a history museum located at No. 92 of Baisha Road in Tianxin District, Changsha, Hunan, China. It is adjacent to Baisha Well in the south and Tianxin Pavilion in the west. Changsha Jiandu Museum is currently a large-scale modern themed museum dedicated to the collection, preservation, arrangement, study, and exhibition of bamboo and wooden slips (Jiandu). It covers an area of 14,100 square metres (152,000 sq ft).

== History ==
The Changsha Bamboo Slips Museum was founded on 16 November 2002. Construction started in 2000 and completed in late 2003. On November 8, 2007, it was officially opened to the public. In May 2009, it was authorized as a "Second Grade National Museum" (国家二级博物馆) by the State Administration of Cultural Heritage. In January 2017, it was designated as a "First Grade National Museum" (国家一级博物馆) by the State Administration of Cultural Heritage.

== Collection ==
The collection of the museum includes bamboo scripts and historical artifacts from the Han dynasty (206 BC – 220 AD) and Three Kingdoms (220–280) periods: the Eastern Wu annals (220–280), unearthed in Changsha's Zoumalou in 1996; the bamboo scripts of Western Han (206 BC – 25 AD), unearthed from J8 Well in Zoumalou in 2003; the bamboo scripts and cultural relics, unearthed from the Yuyang Tomb for one of the queens of Changsha Kingdom of the Western Han dynasty in 1993; and a small number of exquisite cultural relics of later periods excavated from Changsha in the 21st century.

== Access ==
The museum does not charge an admission fee. It is closed on Tuesdays, and is open from 9:00 am to 5:00 pm daily.

== Transportation ==
- Take bus No. 旅2, 122, 202, 314, 406, or 803 to Chengnan Intersection Bus Stop (城南路口)
- Take bus No. 124 or 901 to the West Door of Tianxin Pavilion Bus Stop (天心阁西门)

== Gallery ==
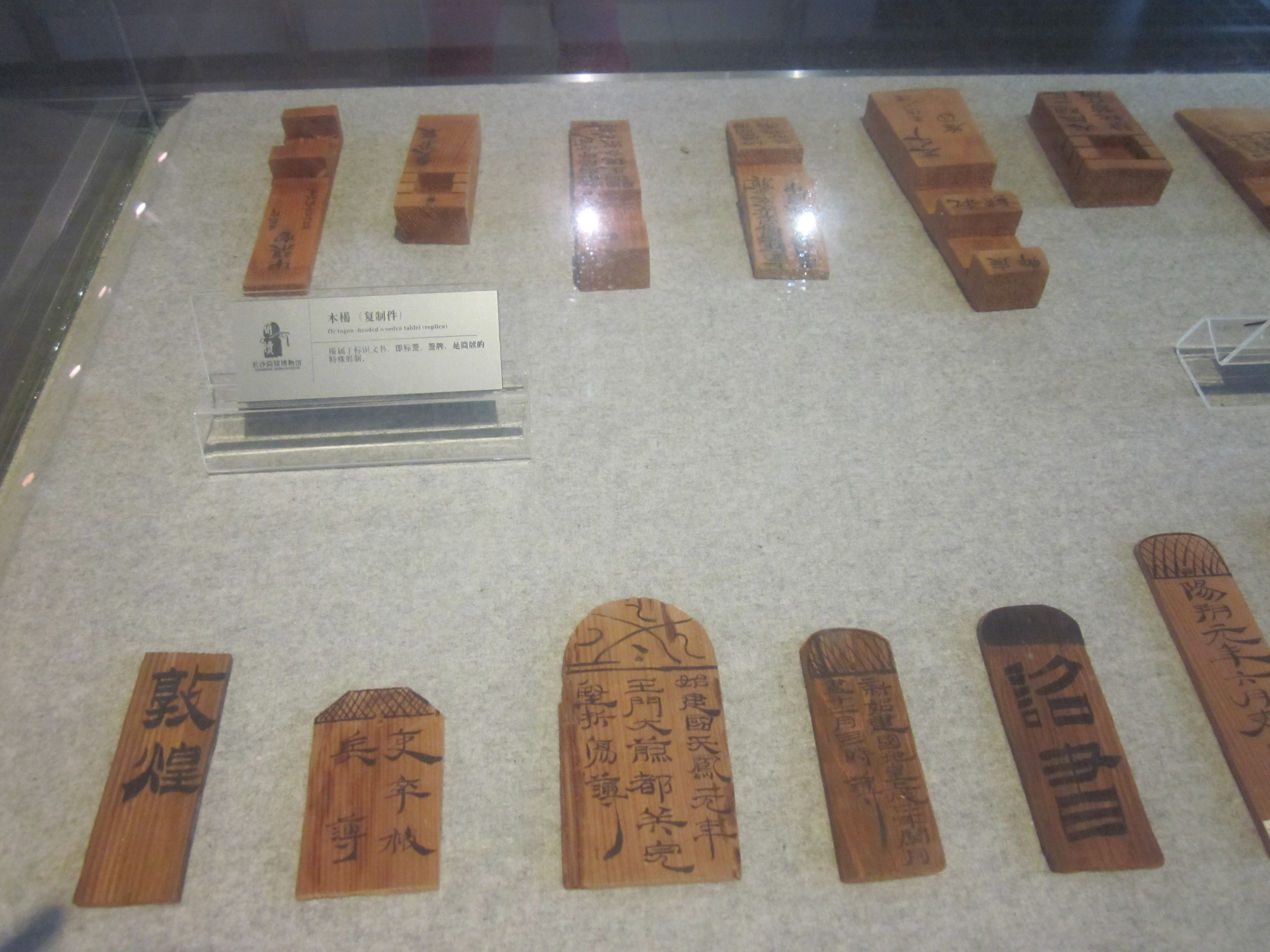
Octagon-headed wooden tablet (replica)

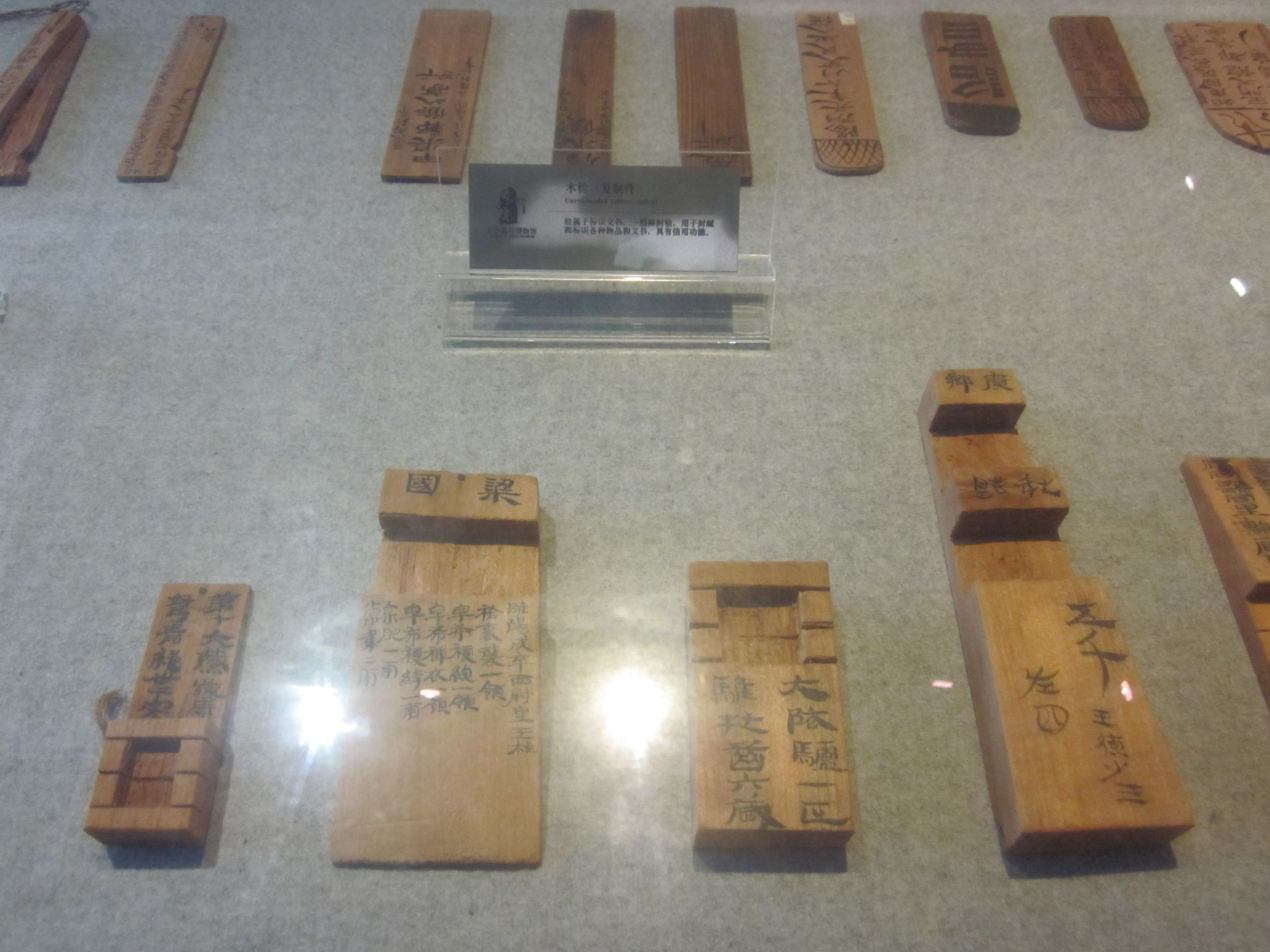
Curve-headed tablets (replica)

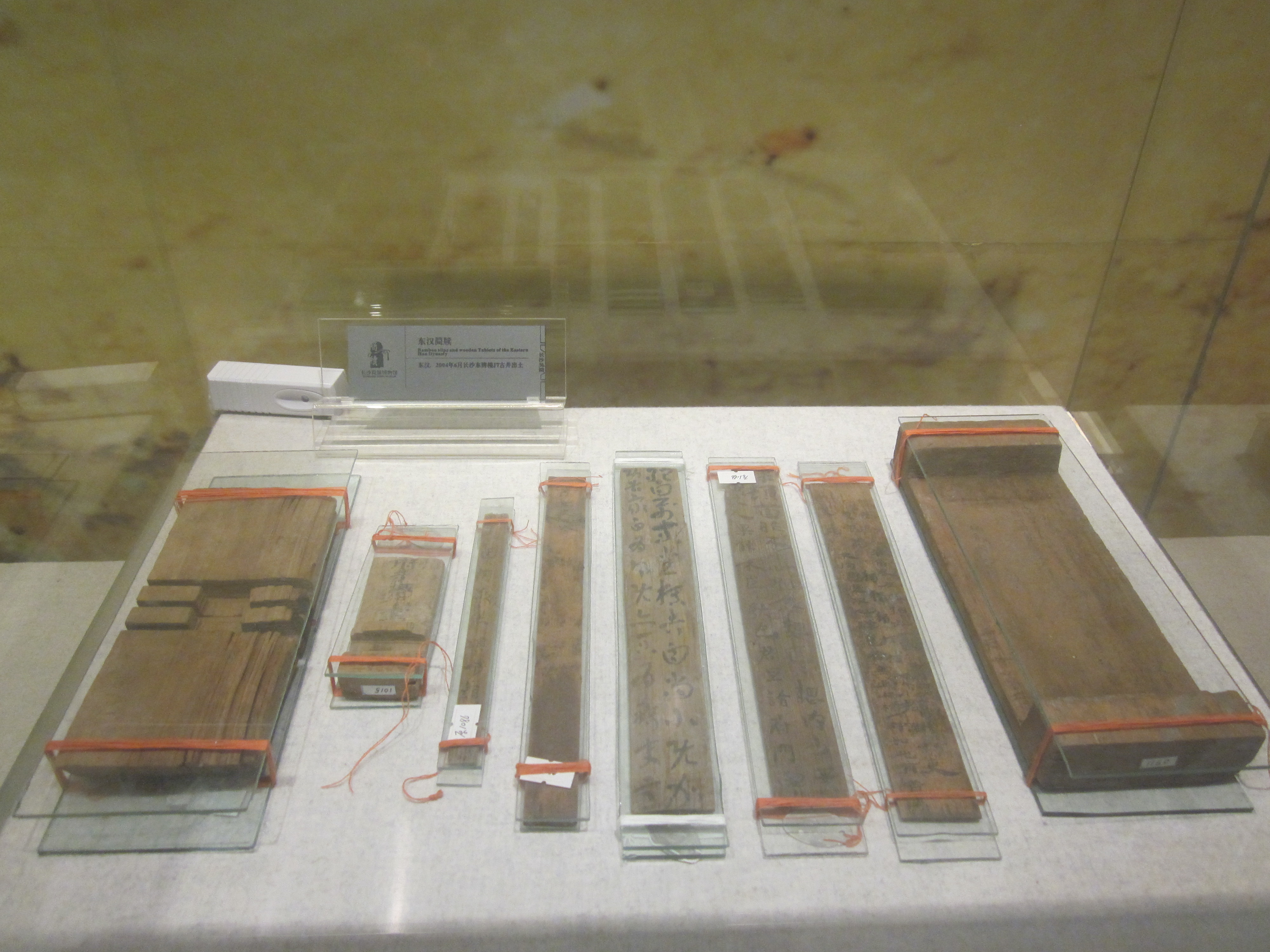
Bamboo slips of the Eastern Han dynasty

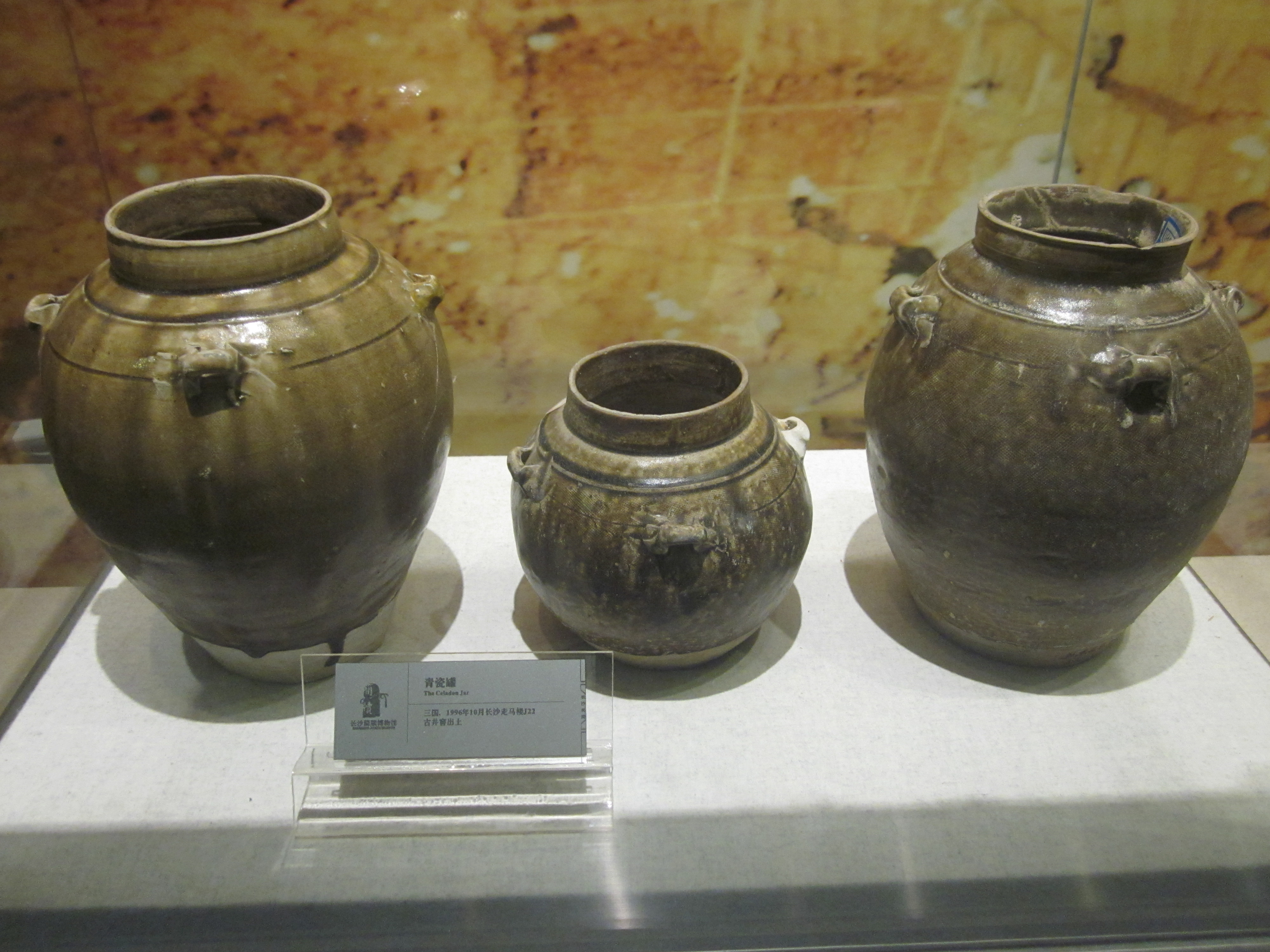
Celadon Jars unearthed from Zoumalou in 1996

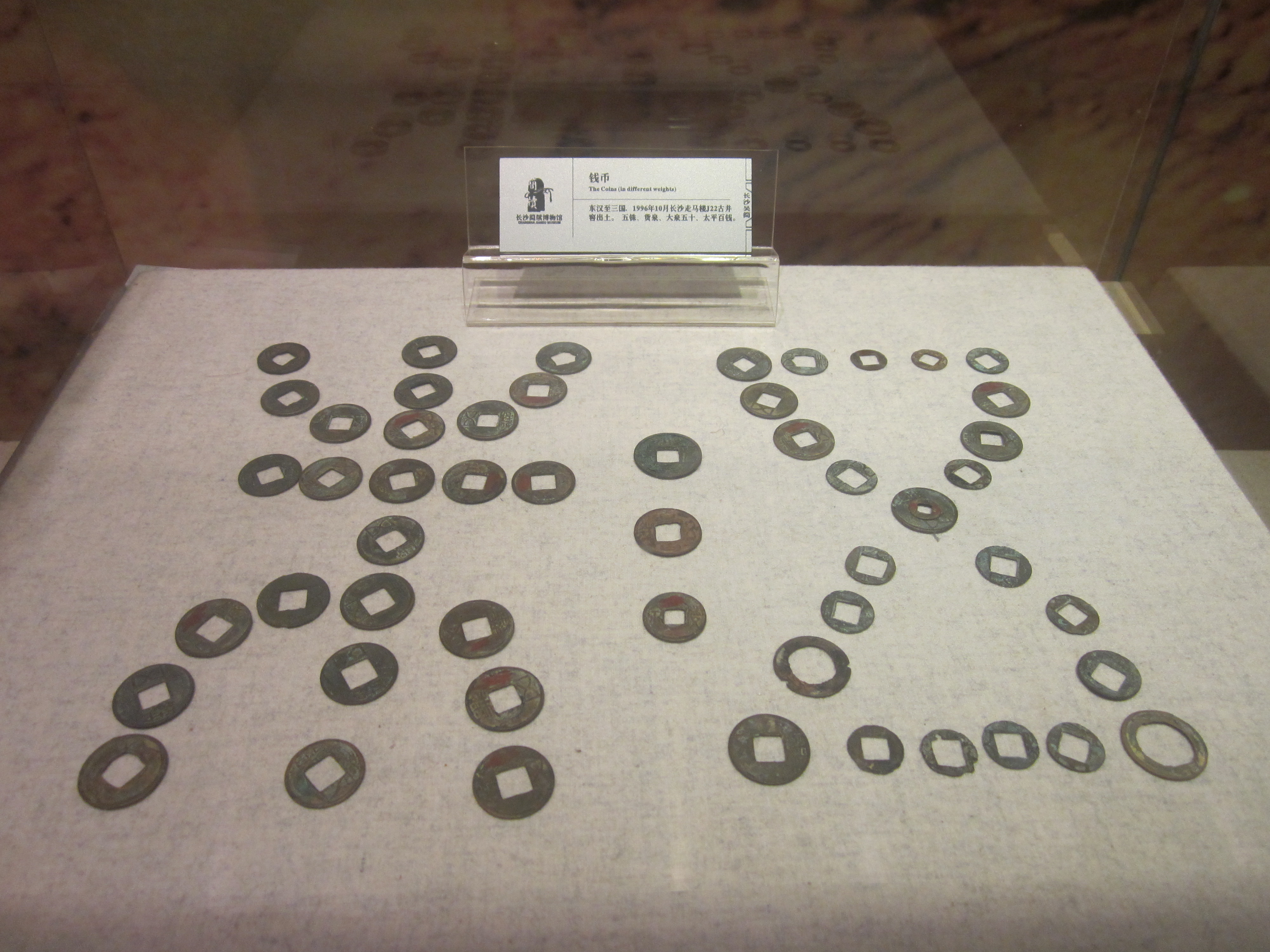
Coins unearthed from Zoumalou in 1996

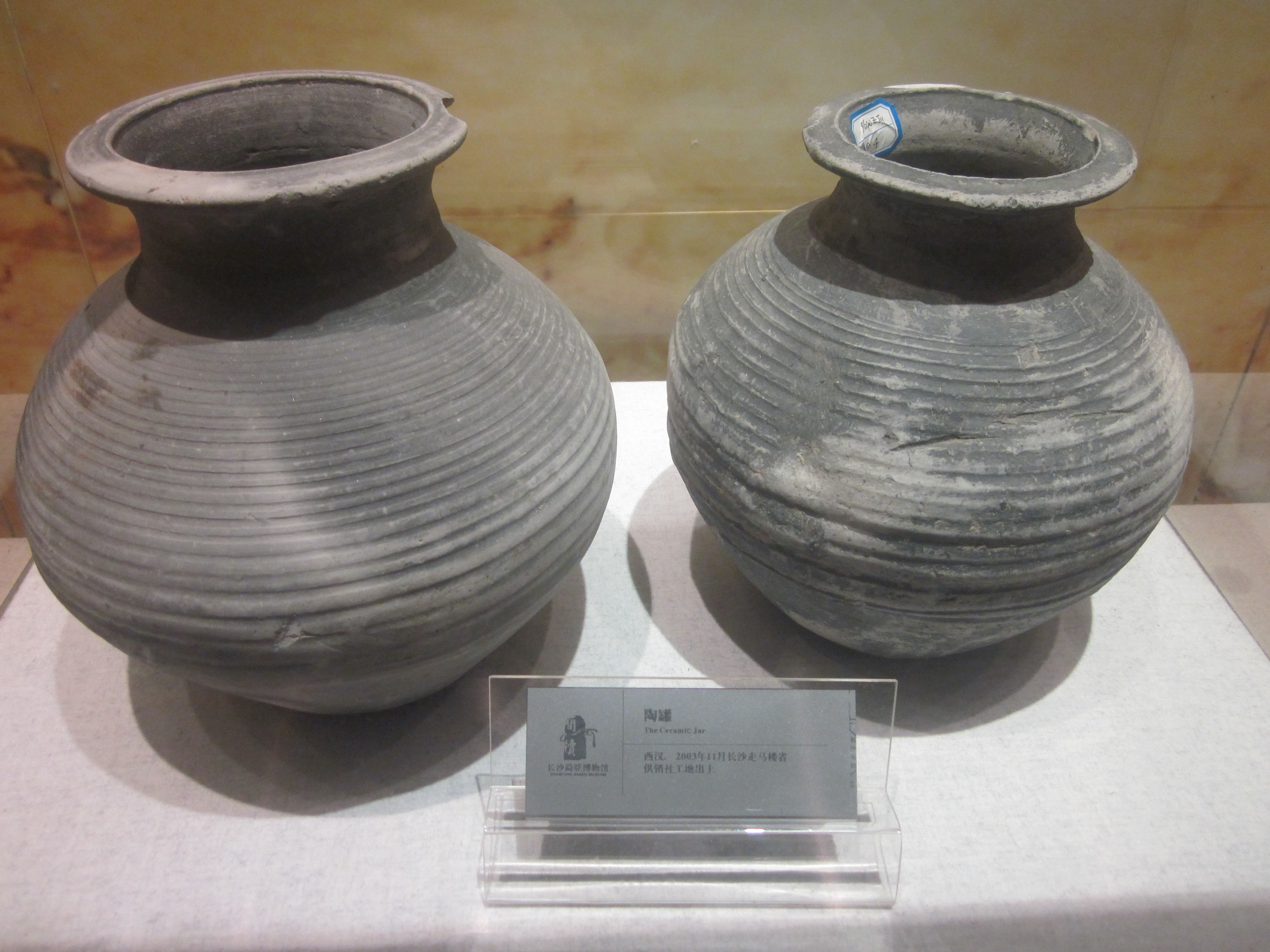
Steans unearthed from Changsha in 2003

== See also ==
- Zoumalou bamboo slips
