= Anhui University Bamboo Strips =

Ancient Chinese manuscripts

The Anhui University Bamboo Strips (安徽大學竹簡), also known as Anda Bamboo Strips (安大簡) is a corpus of manuscripts purchased by the Anhui University in 2015, and currently under publication. Since the corpus comes from illegal excavations, specifics about its recovery are lost. Through radiocarbon dating analysis conducted at Peking University, the material has been dated to the Warring States period (approximately 330 BC). It is yet another discovery that enriches scholarly understanding of this ancient era, alongside other recoveries, such as the Guodian collection, the Shanghai Museum Collection, and the Tsinghua corpus.

== Overview ==
According to preliminary publications, the corpus includes 1,167 strips, in fairly good conditions, with length ranging from 21.3 to 48.5 cm. The editors in charge of curating and publishing the collection divided the material into four groups.

1. A manuscript version of partial content in the Book of Odes. This is the first one published by the editor, in the first volume Anhui daxue cang Zhanguo zhujian (yi) 安徽大學藏戰國竹簡 (—).
2. Circa 450 strips related to history of the state of Chu. This group is further subdivided into two sections on the basis of writing style: a section of 300 strips, covering the bureaucratic structure of the Chu state, and a section of circa 150 strips recording historical events.
3. A group of philosophical texts, of circa 376 strips. This includes sayings attributed to Confucius, some of which previously known from the Lunyu, and some of which previously unknown. There are also writings on how the noble person (君子) ought to behave, a parallel version of the Shanghai Museum manuscript Cao Mo zhi zhen 曹沫之陳, and writings related to the text that goes by the name of its alleged authors, Mozi and the Zhuangzi.
4. Material similar or related to the Chu Ci, in two groups of 24 and 27 strips each.

The remaining material cover topics of oneiromancy and physiognomy.

== Content ==
- The first volume Anhui daxue cang Zhanguo zhujian (yi) 安徽大學藏戰國竹簡（一）was published in 2019. The editors collected strips that represented a section of the Book of Odes. This manuscript initially comprised 117 numbered strips, of which only 93 survive. It preserves a total of 57 odes, and three more can be reconstructed. The first issue of volume 4 of the journal Bamboo and Silk collects studies of this first manuscripts.
- According to preliminary reports, the second volume will include a manuscript titled Zhongni 仲尼 (courtesy name of Confucius 孔子) by the editors. The manuscript is of 13 strips, around 43 cm long and with a 0.6 width. Strips 1 to 7 are numbered on the verso side, and there are writings on the verso of strips 7, 8, and 12. Albeit not titled, the manuscript covers content related to the transmitted Analects 論語. For example, strip 7 reads "仲尼曰：古之學者自為，今之學為人"; Analects 14.24 reads "子曰：古之學者為己，今之學者為人。" While the content conveyed is the same, the manuscript shows a degree of stability at the level of individual sayings, and occasionally some clusters. The arrangement in chapters, when compared to the transmitted Analects, differs. This situation differs from the arrangement of content in the case of the Odes, whose sections and ode sequence are more stable. The second volume was published in 2022.
- A version of the text Cao Mie zhi zhen 曹沫之陣, known in the scholarship as one of the manuscripts of the Shanghai Museum collection (published in volume 4). The Anhui University version is of 44 strips, 2 fewer than the Shanghai Museum version. In both cases, the title has been assigned by the editors. They are circa 48.5 cm long, and 0.6 in width; each strip has circa 45 characters per strip (as opposed to the 33 characters per strip in the Shanghai version). The verso side has cuts, although they do not appear to give a single continuous line. Like the Shanghai Cao Mie zhi zhen, this new manuscript narrates a dialogue between Duke Zhuang of Lu 鲁莊公 and his advisor Cao Mie 曹沫. The two manuscripts have both lexical and graphic variations.
