= Guan ju =

Classical Chinese poem

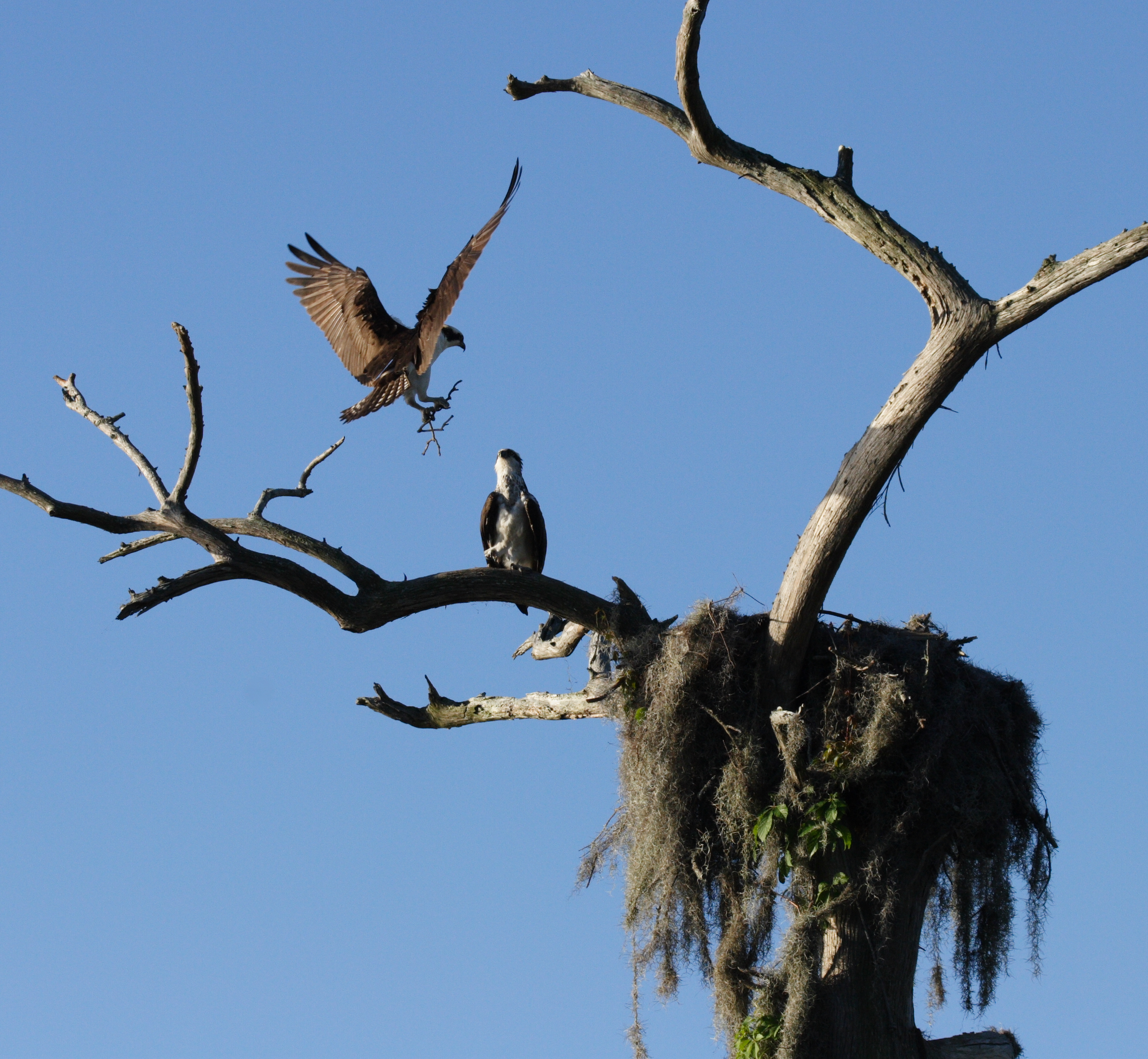
A pair of ospreys, which inspired the title of the poem.

Guan ju (traditional Chinese: 關雎; simplified Chinese: 关雎; pinyin: Guān jū; Wade–Giles: Kuan^{¹} chü^{¹}: "Guan guan cry the ospreys", often mistakenly written with the unrelated but similar-looking character 睢, suī) is the first poem from the ancient anthology Shi Jing (Classic of Poetry), and is one of the best known poems in Chinese literature. It has been dated to the seventh century BC, making it also one of China's oldest poems, though not the oldest in the Shi Jing. The title of the poem comes from its first line (Guan guan ju jiu), which evokes a scene of ospreys calling on a river islet. Fundamentally the poem is about finding a good and fair maiden as a match for a young noble.

Guan ju boasts a long tradition of commentaries. Traditional Chinese commentators, represented by the "Three Schools" and the Mao School, hold that the poem contains a moral pertinent to the relationship between genders. However, modern commentators, and some Western sinologists, offer different interpretations.

The poem has been culturally important since antiquity. According to the Analects, Confucius remarked that it displayed both joy and sorrow but neither to an excessive degree. The poem has subsequently been alluded to repeatedly in Chinese literature and continues to be quoted on occasion in the modern written language and in speech. In particular, the lines 窈窕淑女 "fair and good lady", 求之不得 "seeking and not getting", and 辗转反侧 "to toss and turn in bed" have become well-known four-character classical idioms or set phrases (chengyu).

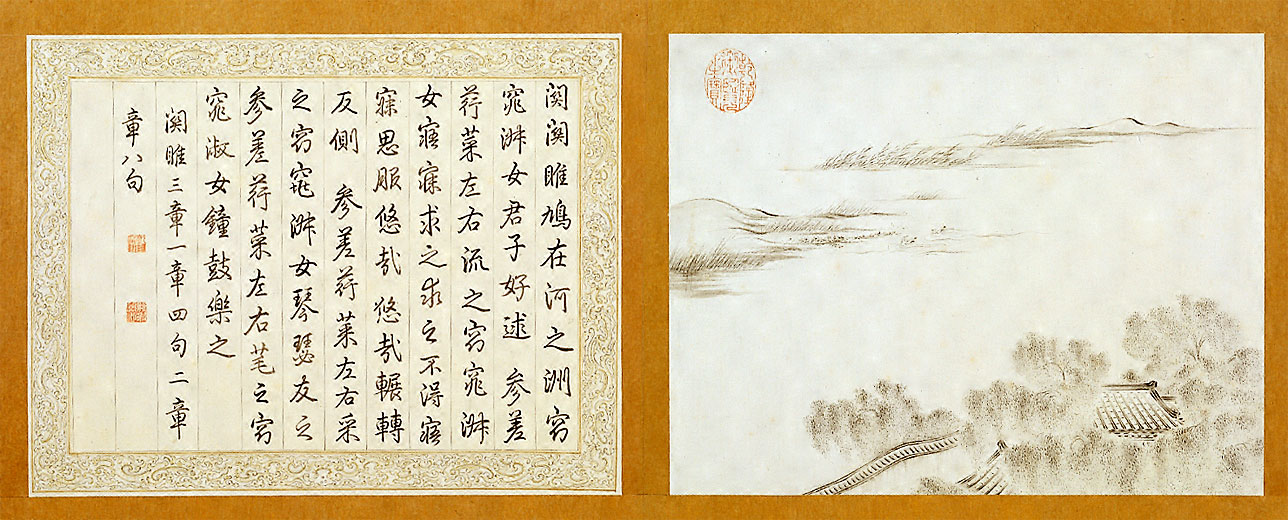
Calligraphy and watercolor illustration of the Guan ju by the Qianlong Emperor.

== Synopsis and structure ==
"Guan ju" is part of the first section of the Shi Jing entitled "Zhou nan" (周南), itself a part of "Airs of the States" (國風), which make up 160 out of the 305 poems of the anthology. It is fairly typical of the other poems of the Airs of the States, being made up of three tetrasyllabic stanzas of four to eight lines each.

=== Poem ===
A translation of the Guan ju poem to English by Chinese master translator Xu Yuanchong is below:

Cooing And Wooing
By riverside are cooing
A pair of turtledoves;
A good young man is wooing
A fair maiden he loves.
Water flows left and right
Of cress long here, short there;
The youth yearns day and night
For the good maiden fair.
His yearning grows so strong,
He can not fall asleep,
But tosses all night long,
So deep in love, so deep!
Now gather left and right
Cress long or short and tender!
O lute, play music bright
For the bride sweet and slender!
Feast friends at left and right
On cress cooked till tender!
O bells and drums, delight
The bride so sweet and slender!

=== Interpretation ===
An interpretation of another translation of the poem is as follows. Each stanza begins with a natural image, which is juxtaposed without comment to the human situation around which the poem centres. The first stanza begins with the onomatopoeic cry of ospreys:

"Guan guan" cry the ospreys
On the islet in the river.

The stanza then rehearses formulaic lines, drawn from the human context:

The beautiful and good young lady
Is a fine mate for the noble.

The entire poem consists of a series of isolated episodes which can be linked into a continuous narrative. It alternates between natural images and human situations, two literally unrelated frames of reference. One set of formulaic lines refers to a male-female relationship:

The beautiful and good young lady
Is a fine mate for the lord. (3-4)
...
The beautiful and good young lady
Waking and sleeping he wished for her. (7-8)
...
The beautiful and good young lady
Zithers and lutes greet her as friend. (15-16)
...
The beautiful and good young lady
Bells and drums delight her. (19-20)

Lines 9-12 intrude upon the formulaic scheme, making the poem asymmetrical:

He wished for her without getting her.
Waking and sleeping he thought of her:
Longingly, longlingly,
He tossed and turned from side to side.

The human elements of the poem (lines 3-4, 7-12, 15-16, 19-20) can read as either a first or third person narrative. If such a reading is taken, the poem begins with a statement of the male persona's longing for an ideal beloved in the first stanza, depicts the withholding of fulfillment in the second, and concludes with an eventual realisation of these desires in the third stanza.

The other set of formulaic lines describe, in vividly physical and tangible action, the rustic world of harvesting plants, incrementally varying the key verb of physical activity:

Varied in length are the water plants;
Left and right we catch them. (5-6)
...
Varied in length are the water plants;
Left and right we gather them. (13-14)
...
Varied in length are the water plants;
Left and right we cull them as vegetable. (17-18)

This usage of natural images in juxtaposition to human situations was given the term xing (興) by early commentators, and was regarded as one of the three rhetorical devices of the Shi Jing. It is not easy to find an equivalent in Western literature, but xing can be explained as a method of creating the mood, atmosphere or context within which the remainder of the poem takes place, and which exerts influence over the possible meanings of the rest of the poem’s action. It has variously been translated as "stimulus", "stimulates", and "motif". Although there is no historical evidence to prove that the composer of "Guan ju" were intentionally employing such a rhetorical device, there have been a myriad of interpretations as to the purpose of the xing.

== Traditional interpretations ==
The earliest known commentary on "Guan ju" is contained in the Analects, and is attributed to Confucius. Confucius praises "Guan ju" for its moderated emotions: "The Master said, "In the "Guan ju" there is joy without wantonness and sorrow without self-injury." Brooks and Brooks date this portion of the Analects to 342 BCE, and this may have been when "Guan ju" first came to prominence. The Confucians were responsible for the tendency of much orthodox criticism to regard not only the Shi Jing but all literature in general as morally edifying or didactic in some way. One legend held that Confucius himself had selected the songs in the Shi Jing from an original pool of three thousand based on their moral import.

From early on the poems of the Shi Jing were used for their moral communicative value. There were, however, striking disagreements among early scholars as to how to interpret "Guan ju". In pre-Qin times, at three textual traditions - the "Three Schools of the Poems" (詩三家) of Lu, Qi, and Han - existed. These interpretations of "Guan ju" were eventually superseded by the Han dynasty Mao commentarial tradition, which is the only tradition that has survived into the modern era in its entirety.

=== The Lu school reading ===
The first exegetical tradition saw "Guan ju" as a poem of political criticism. Although the Guan ju itself offers no hint of a satirical intent, commentators from the Lu school explain that the poem criticises the improper behaviour of King Kang of Zhou and his wife (eleventh century BCE) by presenting contrasting, positive images of male-female decorum. The Lu school held that King Kang had committed an egregious violation of ritual by being late for court one morning. The earliest references to it are in Liu Xiang's Lienü zhuan (16 BCE) and Wang Chong's Lun heng. However, the nature of Kang's offence is best preserved in a memorial by Yang Ci in Yuan Hong's Hou Han ji:

In antiquity, King Kang of Zhou continued the prosperity of King Wen. One morning, he was late to rise. The Lady did not chime her jade crescent pendants. The gatekeeper did not strike the double-hour. The poet of "Guan ju" perceived the germ of disorder and wrote.

The Lu school reading evolved further towards the end of the Han dynasty. Zhang Chao, in his "Qiao 'Qingyi fu'" names the minister alluded to in Lun heng, as the Duke of Bi (畢公). According to Zhang Chao's version of the Lu tradition, the Duke of Bi's purpose was "to prevent degeneracy and reproach its progress, / Tactfully criticised and admonished the lord, his father." In other words, "Guan ju" could be read as both a poem of praise, extolling the excellent match of the beautiful and good young lady and the lord, and as a poem of criticism, intended to cause the listener, King Kang, to reflect on his and his consort's shortcomings.

Brief references to the dating of the poem to King Kang's reign appear in Shi Ji China's first universal history. The historian Sima Qian wrote, "Alas! When the house of Zhou was in decline, the "Guan ju" was composed." However, as Wang Chong and modern scholars have pointed out, this appears to conflict with Sima's own account of King Kang's reign, which records no deficiencies or evidence of decline.

The Lu school interpretation was probably the dominant one during the Han dynasty. It persisted well into the fifth century, even appearing in Fan Ye's Hou Han Shu (completed before CE 445), but was eventually eclipsed by the Mao school.

=== The Mao school reading ===
The second interpretive tradition, and the one which became dominant, chose to read "Guan ju" as a poem of praise, and specifically of the queen of the founder of the Zhou dynasty, King Wen. This reading is called the Mao school, after Mao Heng and Mao Chang, early annotators to the Shi Jing. Their notes to the Shi Jing, along with those of later scholars who agreed with them, were edited by Kong Yingda and published in the seventh century as Mao shi zheng yi (毛詩正義). The Mao School explains the poem as a purposeful analogy, and identifies the young lady as King Wen's queen Tai Si. It reads the images of picking water grasses as literal descriptions of the queen's activities in preparation for ritual sacrifices. The preface to the poem, attributed to Wei Hong and generally including along with the Mao text, explains the meaning of "Guan ju":

"Guan ju" speaks of the virtue of the queen. It is the beginning of the "Airs", by which all under heaven was transformed and relations between husband and wife were corrected ... Thus "Guan ju" takes joy in obtaining a pure young lady as a mate for the lord and is anxious to present her worth. She is not wanton in her beauty, is sorrowful about seclusion while longing for those of worth and talent without feeling injured by their excellence. This is the meaning of "Guan ju".

The prefaces to the remaining ten poems in the "Zhou nan", the first section of the Shi Jing, all describe the songs as referring to one or another aspect of the queen's virtuous influence.

One century after the Maos, Zheng Xuan introduced an interesting twist to the Mao interpretation. In his eyes the "pure young lady" refers not to the queen herself, but rather to palace ladies whom their mistress, in her virtuous and jealousy-free seclusion, is seeking as additional mates for the king. Thus it is she who tosses and turns until finding them.

The influential Song dynasty Neo-Confucian Zhu Xi largely agreed with the Mao school, but added a remark that the poem was composed not by some unknown poet but by the ladies of the royal palace. He also differs with the Mao school by reading the scenes depicting the picking of water grasses not as literal, but as juxtaposed, analogical images like the opening couplet.

=== Other readings ===
Not all traditional readings considered that "Guan ju" contained political and allegorical references. The excavation in 1973 of the text known as Wuxingpian (五行篇) at the Mawangdui revealed a style of Confucian thinking which focused more on the moral and emotional messages evoked by the everyday human situations found in the lyrics. The Wuxingpian explains "Guan ju" as a poem about sexual desire, more specifically, the inherent human moral urge to regulate one's sexual desire to accord with the mores of one's community. The approach is equally concerned with the business of moral didacticism, but directed to inherent personal morality, rather than the learned morality of blameless or reprehensible political figures, as in the Mao commentary.

Song period scholar Zheng Qiao (鄭樵) radically challenges traditional exegesis. He thinks that the poem is just an archaic folksong. He also objects to the identification of jujiu 雎鳩 with the ospreys, who cannot make the sounds "guan-guan", so he proposes that the jujiu 雎鳩 be identified as the mallard ducks instead.

== Modern interpretations ==
In the second half of the nineteenth century, Western sinologists and literary scholars began to study the Shi Jing. While some of the first, including the Jesuit Seraphin Couvreur, the first translator of the text into French, persisted with readings based on the Mao school’s interpretation, the majority of Western scholarship has sought novel hermeneutic approaches.

James Legge, who published one of the poem's early English translations in 1871, rejected the explanatory prefaces to the poems in the Mao text, "to follow which would reduce many of them to absurd enigmas".

The late twentieth century scholar Qu Wanli (屈萬里) takes "Guan ju" as expressing the emotional anxiety and excitement of a man about to be married, whose wife is greeted at the end of the poem with the ceremonial rites of the wedding as signified by the musical instruments.

Fêtes et Chansons anciennes de la Chine (1911).

The French translator Marcel Granet saw "Guan ju", among with the other "Airs of the States", as lyrics accompanying physical festivities. In his 1911 study Fêtes et Chansons anciennes de la Chine, Granet declared that he excluded "all interpretations which are symbolic or which imply subtlety in the poet." Granet reads the poem as a record of a rural festival involving boys and girls beginning to court each other. The opening image of birds calling to each other is taken by Granet as a metaphor for the young couples, hiding away to seduce each other in private. The final sections of the poem, describing musical instruments are, in Granet’s schema, elements of a feast at the end of the festival - a ceremonial conclusion to the rural gathering.

Arthur Waley agreed with Granet that traditional readings distort the "true nature" of the poems, but he did point out that it was facilitated by the multivalent meanings of words and social practices. For Waley, the Shi Jing was a diverse collection which does not necessarily display a unified function, and, as such, cannot be approached merely with one reading strategy.

C. H. Wang has been vehemently critical of what he calls "a manifest distortion of this classic anthology" and argues that the earliest definition of poetry in Chinese tradition (in Shang Shu) links it with song rather than ethics. He considers that the Shi Jing poems have their roots in oral transmission rather than literary composition, and directed contested the claims of the Mao school that the poems are the product of specific authors referring to specific events in their lives.

Pauline Yu rejects the notion that there is any form of allegory in "Guan ju".

However, not all Western sinologists agree. Edward L. Shaughnessy argues that "Guan ju" is an example of "correlative thought" in traditional Chinese thinking:

Strange though it may seem that the crying of an osprey could evoke the image of a nubile girl, we can begin to see in it something of the intellectual consciousness of the time. Elsewhere in the Shi jing, as in later Chinese culture and in many other cultures as well, the image of the fish signifies sexual fertility. Knowing that the osprey is a fish-eating bird, it is not hard to see that this is a poem concerned with the hunt for a sexual partner. Indeed, the sound of the osprey's cry, as written onomatopeically by the poet, confirms this, guan means "to join, to bring together." The poet heard the osprey calling out: "Join, join."

== Legacy ==
"Guan ju" has been the subject of countless allusions over the centuries. Cai Yong (died 192) is one of the earliest to do in his "Qingyi fu" (青衣賦), a poem celebrating the illicit love between a maid and the poem's male persona: "With the purity of "The Calling Ospreys" / She does not act perverse or contrary".

"Guan ju" remains a popular subject of study for sinologists and graduate students in Chinese studies.

== See also ==
- Classic of Poetry
- Confucius
- Zhou dynasty
- Spring and Autumn period
