= Classic of Poetry =

Collection of ancient Chinese poetry

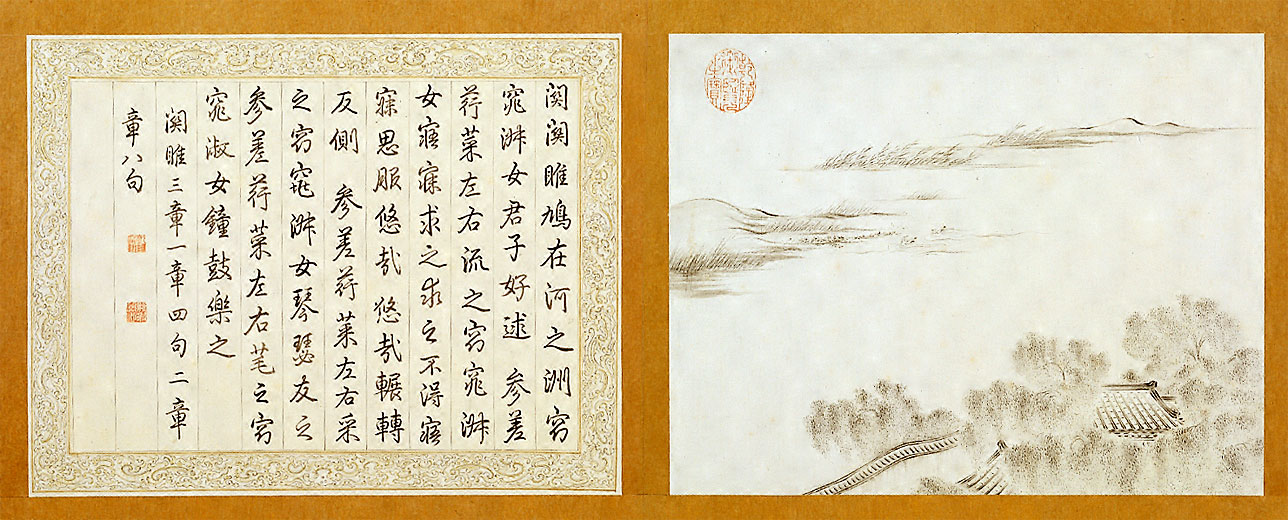
- The first song in the Classic of Poetry, handwritten by the Qianlong Emperor, with accompanying painting
- Language: Old Chinese
- Subject: Ancient Chinese poetry and song
- Publication place: China

Classic of Poetry
- "Classic of Poetry" in seal script (top), (Note: The *k-lˤeng (jing 經) appellation would not have been used until the Han dynasty, after the core Old Chinese period.) Traditional (middle), and Simplified (bottom) Chinese characters

Chinese name
- Traditional Chinese: 詩經
- Simplified Chinese: 诗经
Transcriptions
Standard Mandarin
- Hanyu Pinyin: Shījīng
- Wade–Giles: Shih^{1}-ching^{1}
- IPA: [ʂɻ̩́ tɕíŋ]
Wu
- Romanization: Sy-chin
Yue: Cantonese
- Yale Romanization: Sī-gīng
- Jyutping: Si^{1}-ging^{1}
- IPA: [si˥ kɪŋ˥]
Southern Min
- Hokkien POJ: Si-keng
Middle Chinese
- Middle Chinese: /ɕɨ keŋ/
Old Chinese
- Baxter (1992): *stjɨ (keng)
- Baxter–Sagart (2014): *s.tə (k-lˤeng)

Vietnamese name
- Vietnamese: Kinh Thi
- Hán-Nôm: 經詩

Korean name
- Hangul: 시경
- Hanja: 詩經
Transcriptions
- Revised Romanization: Sigyeong
- McCune–Reischauer: Sigyŏng

Japanese name
- Hiragana: しきょう
- Kyūjitai: 詩經
- Shinjitai: 詩経
Transcriptions
- Romanization: Shikyō

The Classic of Poetry, also Shijing or Shih-ching, translated variously as the Book of Songs, Book of Odes, or simply known as the Odes or Poetry (詩; Shī), is the oldest existing collection of Chinese poetry, comprising 305 works dating from the 11th to 7th centuries BC. It is one of the "Five Classics" traditionally said to have been edited by Confucius, and has been studied and memorized by scholars in China and neighboring countries over two millennia. It is also a rich source of chengyu (four-character classical idioms) that are still a part of learned discourse and even everyday language in modern Chinese. Since the Qing dynasty, its rhyme patterns have also been analysed in the study of Old Chinese phonology.

== Name ==
Early references refer to the anthology as the 300 Poems (shi). The Odes first became known as a jīng, or a "classic book", in the canonical sense, as part of the Han dynasty's official adoption of Confucianism as the guiding principle of Chinese society. The same word shi later became a generic term for poetry. In English, lacking an exact equivalent for the Chinese, the translation of the word shi in this regard is generally as "poem", "song", or "ode". Before its elevation as a canonical classic, the Classic of Poetry (Shi jing) was known as the Three Hundred Songs or the Songs.

== Content ==
The Classic of Poetry contains the oldest chronologically authenticated Chinese poems. The majority of the Odes date to the Western Zhou period (1046–771 BCE), and were drawn from around provinces and cities in the Zhongyuan (Central Plains) area. A final section of 5 "Eulogies of Shang" purports to be ritual songs of the Shang dynasty as handed down by their descendants in the state of Song, but is generally considered quite late in date. According to the Eastern Han scholar Zheng Xuan, the latest material in the Shijing was the song "Tree-Stump Grove" (株林) in the "Odes of Chen", dated to the middle of the Spring and Autumn period (c. 700 BCE).

| Part | Number and meaning | Date (BCE) |
|---|---|---|
| 國風 Guó fēng | 160 "Airs of the States" | 8th & 7th centuries |
| 小雅 Xiǎo yǎ | 74 "Lesser Court Hymns" | 9th & 8th centuries |
| 大雅 Dà yǎ | 31 "Major Court Hymns" | 10th & 9th centuries |
| 周頌 Zhōu sòng | 31 "Eulogies of Zhou" | 11th & 10th centuries |
| 魯頌 Lǔ sòng | 4 "Eulogies of Lu" | 7th century |
| 商頌 Shāng sòng | 5 "Eulogies of Shang" | 7th century |

The content of the Poetry can be divided into two main sections: the "Airs of the States", and the "Eulogies" and "Hymns".

The "Airs of the States" are shorter lyrics in simple language that are generally ancient folk songs which record the voice of the common people. They often speak of love and courtship, longing for an absent lover, soldiers on campaign, farming and housework, and political satire and protest. The first song of the "Airs of the States", "Fishhawk" (Guān jū 關雎), is a well-known example of the category. Confucius commented on it, and it was traditionally given special interpretive weight.

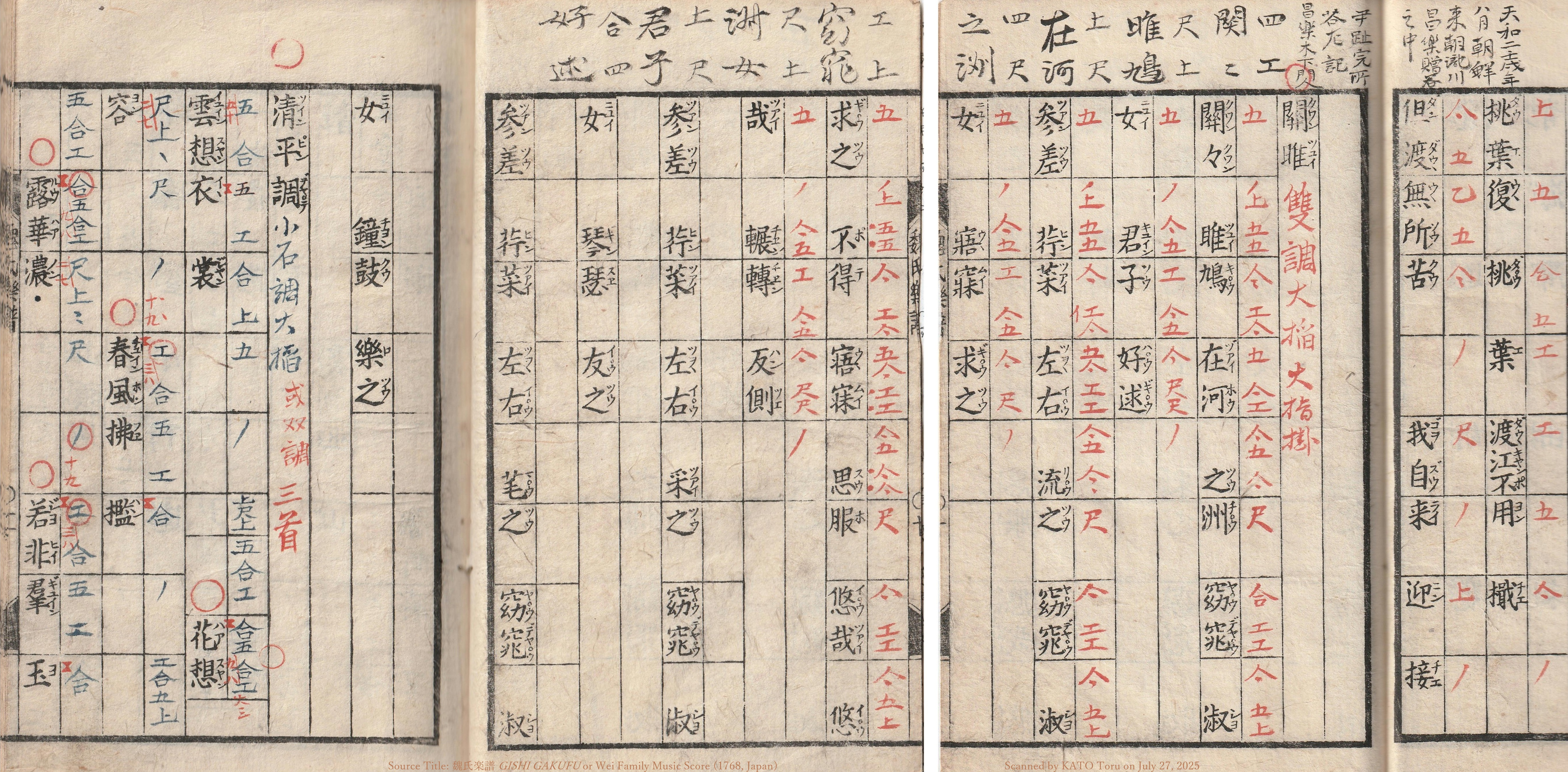
The traditional score of 'Fishhawk' included in the Wei Family Music Score (Gishi Gakufu) (1768, Japan)

關關雎鳩
在河之洲
窈窕淑女
君子好逑

參差荇菜
左右流之
窈窕淑女
寤寐求之

求之不得
寤寐思服
悠哉悠哉
輾轉反側

參差荇菜
左右采之
窈窕淑女
琴瑟友之

參差荇菜
左右芼之
窈窕淑女
鐘鼓樂之

— "Fishhawk" (Guān jū 關雎),
translated by Stephen Owen
Translation:

The fishhawks sing gwan-gwan
On sandbars of the stream.
Gentle maiden, pure and fair,
Fit pair for a prince.

Watercress grows here and there,
Right and left we gather it.
Gentle maiden, pure and fair,
Wanted waking and sleep.

Wanting, sought her, had her not,
Waking, sleeping, thought of her,
On and on he thought of her,
He tossed from one side to another.

Watercress grows here and there,
Right and left we pull it.
Gentle maiden, pure and fair,
With harps we bring her company.

Watercress grows here and there,
Right and left we pick it out.
Gentle maiden, pure and fair,
With bells and drums do her delight.

On the other hand, songs in the two "Hymns" sections and the "Eulogies" section tend to be longer ritual or sacrificial songs, usually in the forms of courtly panegyrics and dynastic hymns which praise the founders of the Zhou dynasty. They also include hymns used in sacrificial rites and songs used by the aristocracy in their sacrificial ceremonies or at banquets.

"Court Hymns" contains "Lesser Court Hymns" and "Major Court Hymns". Most of the poems were used by the aristocrats to pray for good harvests each year, worship gods, and venerate their ancestors. The authors of "Major Court Hymns" are nobles who were dissatisfied with the political reality. Therefore, they wrote poems not only related to the feast, worship, and epic but also to reflect the public feelings.

於穆清廟
肅雝顯相
濟濟多士
秉文之德
對越在天
駿奔走在廟
不顯不承
無射於人斯

— "Clear Temple" (Qīng miào 清廟),
translated by Martin Kern
Translation:

Ah! Solemn is the clear temple,
Reverent and concordant the illustrious assistants.
Dignified, dignified are the many officers,
Holding fast to the virtue of King Wen.
Responding in praise to the one in Heaven,
They hurry swiftly within the temple.
Greatly illustrious, greatly honored,
May [King Wen] never be weary of [us] men.

== Style ==
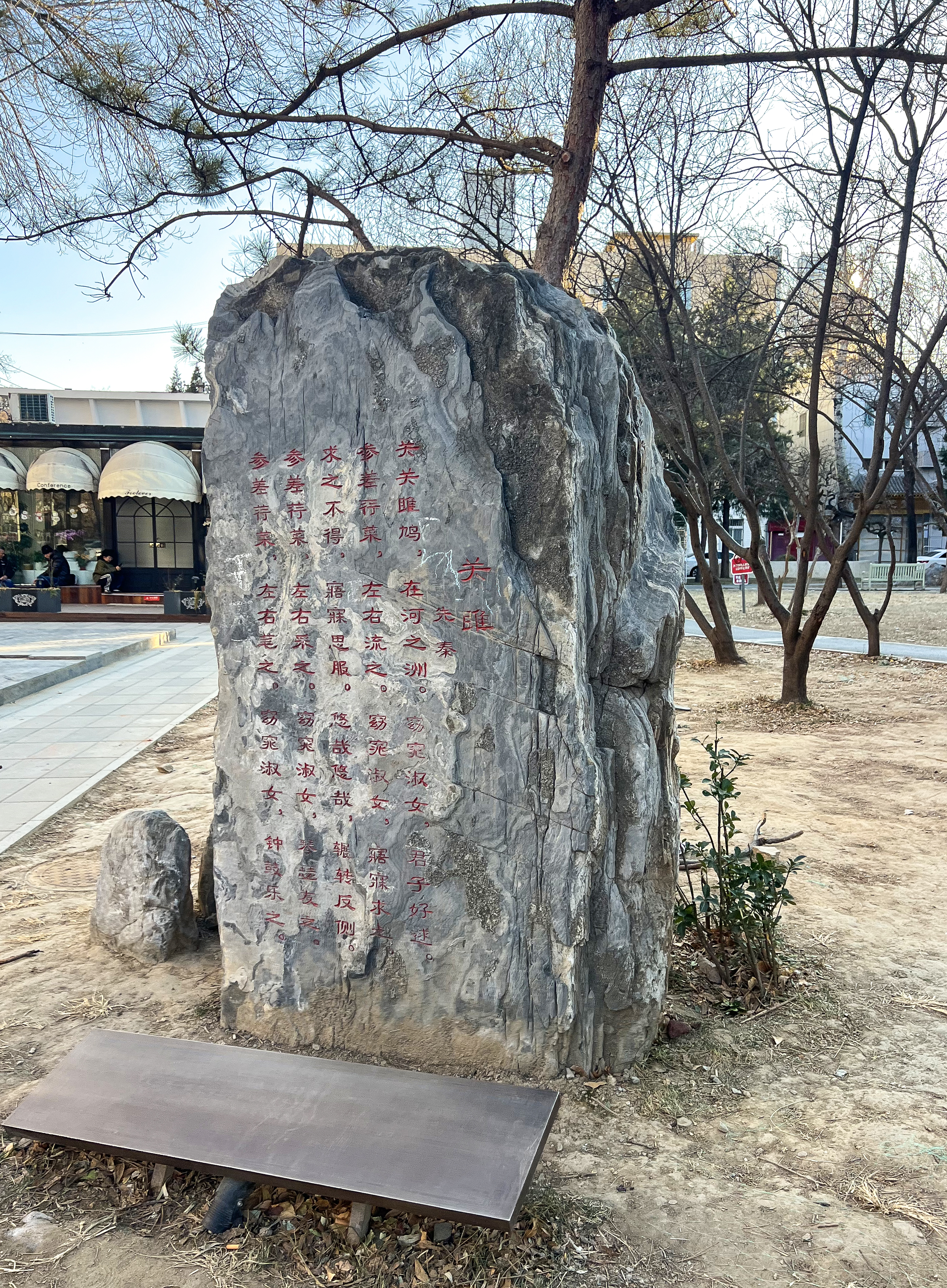
Guan ju (poem number 1 from the Classic of Poetry) carved into a rock. The four-character verses are inscribed from top to bottom.

Whether the various Shijing poems were folk songs or not, they "all seem to have passed through the hands of men of letters at the royal Zhou court". In other words, they show an overall literary polish together with some general stylistic consistency. About 95% of lines in the Poetry are written in a four-syllable meter, with a slight caesura between the second and third syllables. Lines tend to occur in syntactically related couplets, with occasional parallelism, and longer poems are generally divided into similarly structured stanzas.

All but six of the "Eulogies" consist of a single stanza, and the "Court Hymns" exhibit wide variation in the number of stanzas and their lengths. Almost all of the "Airs", however, consist of three stanzas, with four-line stanzas being most common. Although a few rhyming couplets occur, the standard pattern in such four-line stanzas required a rhyme between the second and fourth lines. Often the first or third lines would rhyme with these, or with each other. This style later became known as the "shi" style for much of Chinese history.

One of the characteristics of the poems in the Classic of Poetry is that they tend to possess "elements of repetition and variation". This results in an "alteration of similarities and differences in the formal structure: in successive stanzas, some lines and phrases are repeated verbatim, while others vary from stanza to stanza". Characteristically, the parallel or syntactically matched lines within a specific poem share the same, identical words (or characters) to a large degree, as opposed to confining the parallelism between lines to using grammatical category matching of the words in one line with the other word in the same position in the corresponding line; but, not by using the same, identical word(s). Disallowing verbal repetition within a poem would by the time of Tang poetry be one of the rules to distinguish the old style poetry from the new, regulated style.

The works in the Classic of Poetry vary in their lyrical qualities, which relates to the musical accompaniment with which they were in their early days performed. The songs from the "Hymns" and "Eulogies", which are the oldest material in the Poetry, were performed to slow, heavy accompaniment from bells, drums, and stone chimes. However, these and the later actual musical scores or choreography which accompanied the Shijing poems have been lost.

Nearly all of the songs in the Poetry are rhyming, with end rhyme, as well as frequent internal rhyming. While some of these verses still rhyme in modern varieties of Chinese, others had ceased to rhyme by the Middle Chinese period. For example, the eighth song (芣苢 Fú Yǐ (Note: The variant character 苡 may sometimes be used in place of 苢, in which case the title is 芣苡, with corresponding substitutions for the fourth character of each line within the body of the poem.)) has a tightly constrained structure implying rhymes between the penultimate words (here shown in bold) of each pair of lines:

Chinese characters

采采芣苢、薄言采之。
采采芣苢、薄言有之。
采采芣苢、薄言掇之。
采采芣苢、薄言捋之。
采采芣苢、薄言袺之。
采采芣苢、薄言襭之。

Pinyin transliteration

Cǎi cǎi fú yǐ, báo yán **cǎi** zhī.
Cǎi cǎi fú yǐ, báo yán **yǒu** zhī.
Cǎi cǎi fú yǐ, báo yán **duō** zhī.
Cǎi cǎi fú yǐ, báo yán **luō** zhī.
Cǎi cǎi fú yǐ, báo yán **jié** zhī.
Cǎi cǎi fú yǐ, báo yán **xié** zhī.

Early Middle Chinese (Baxter)

tshoj^{X} tshoj^{X} bju yi^{X}, bak ngjon **tshoj^{X}** tsyi.
tshoj^{X} tshoj^{X} bju yi^{X}, bak ngjon **hjuw^{X}** tsyi.
tshoj^{X} tshoj^{X} bju yi^{X}, bak ngjon **twat** tsyi.
tshoj^{X} tshoj^{X} bju yi^{X}, bak ngjon **lwat** tsyi.
tshoj^{X} tshoj^{X} bju yi^{X}, bak ngjon **ket** tsyi.
tshoj^{X} tshoj^{X} bju yi^{X}, bak ngjon **het** tsyi.

The second and third stanzas still rhyme in modern Standard Chinese, with the rhyme words even having the same tone, but the first stanza does not rhyme in Middle Chinese or any modern variety. Such cases were attributed to lax rhyming practice until the late-Ming dynasty scholar Chen Di argued that the original rhymes had been obscured by sound change. Since Chen, scholars have analyzed the rhyming patterns of the Poetry as crucial evidence for the reconstruction of Old Chinese phonology. For instance, 采; cǎi and 有; yǒu in the above example are reconstructed to share the same rhyme, *-əʔ, in Schuessler's "Minimal Old Chinese" (as *tsʰə̂ʔ and *wəʔ respectively) as well as in Baxter and Sagart's Old Chinese reconstruction (as *s.r̥ˤəʔ and *[ɢ]ʷəʔ respectively).

Traditional scholarship of the Poetry identified three major literary devices employed in the songs: straightforward narrative (賦; fù), explicit comparisons (比; bǐ) and implied comparisons (興; xìng). The poems of the Classic of Poetry tend to have certain typical patterns in both rhyme and rhythm, to make much use of imagery, often derived from nature.

== Authorship ==
Although the Shijing does not specify the names of authors in association with the contained works, both traditional commentaries and modern scholarship have put forth hypotheses on authorship. The "Golden Coffer" chapter of the Book of Documents says that the poem "Owl" (鴟鴞) in the "Odes of Bin" was written by the Duke of Zhou. Many of the songs appear to be folk songs and other compositions used in the court ceremonies of the aristocracy. Furthermore, many of the songs, based on internal evidence, appear to be written either by women, or from the perspective of a female persona. The repeated emphasis on female authorship of poetry in the Shijing was made much of in the process of attempting to give the poems of the women poets of the Ming-Qing period canonical status. Despite the impersonality of the poetic voice characteristic of the Songs, many of the poems are written from the perspective of various generic personalities.

== Textual history ==
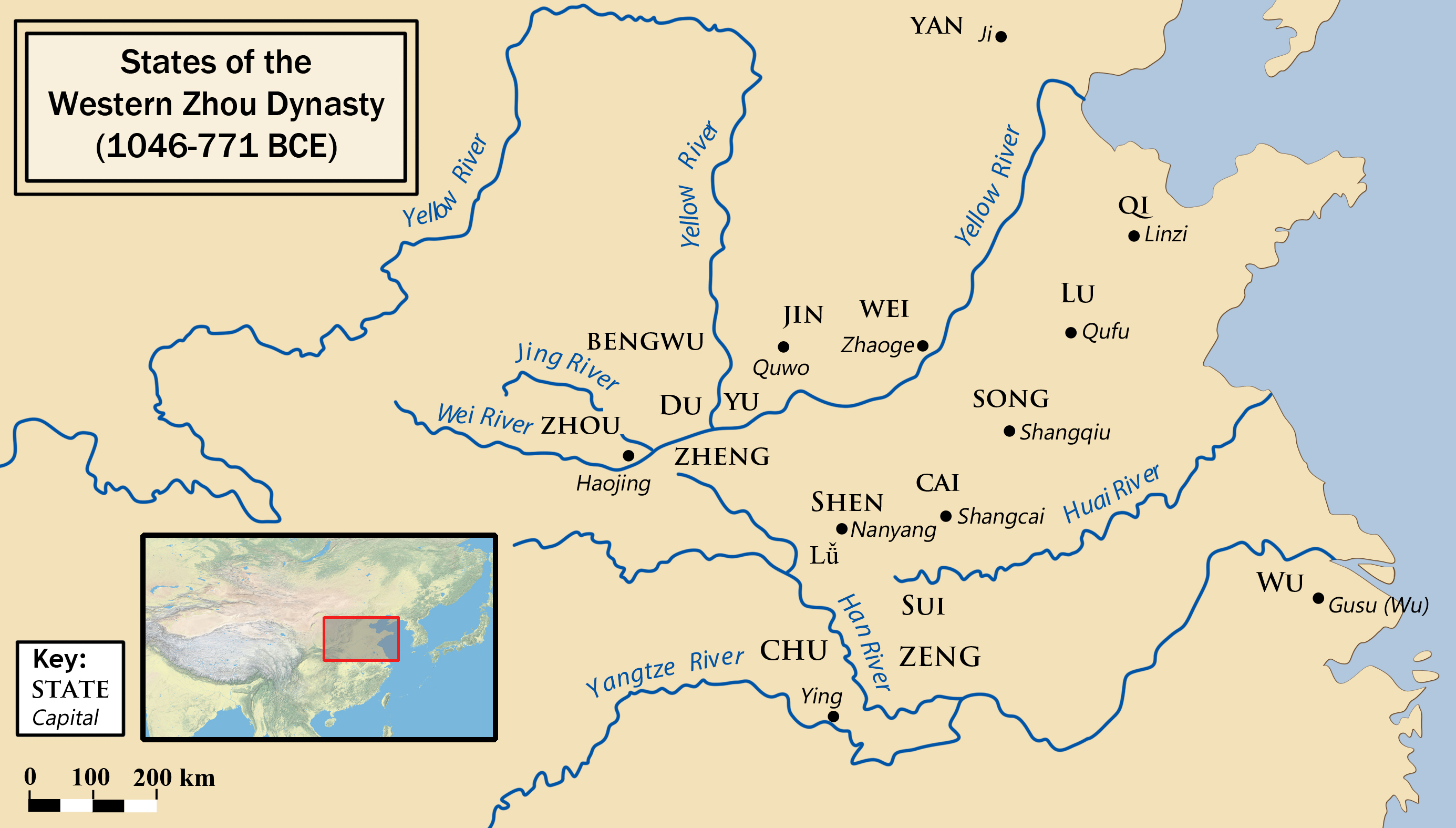
Map of states during Western Zhou period

According to tradition, the method of collection of the various Shijing poems involved the appointment of officials, whose duties included documenting verses current from the various states which constituted the empire. Out of these many collected pieces, also according to tradition, Confucius made a final editorial round of decisions for elimination or inclusion in the received version of the Poetry. As with all great literary works of ancient China, the Poetry has been annotated and commented on continuously throughout history, as well as in this case providing a model to inspire future poetic works.

Various traditions concern the gathering of the compiled songs and the editorial selection from these make up the classic text of the Odes: "Royal Officials' Collecting Songs" (王官采詩) is recorded in the Book of Han, (Note: In the 食貨志.; Shi Huo Zhi) and "Master Confucius Deletes Songs" (孔子刪詩) refers to Confucius and his mention in the Records of the Grand Historian, where it says from originally some 3,000 songs and poems in a previously extant "Odes" that Confucius personally selected the "300" which he felt best conformed to traditional ritual propriety, thus producing the Classic of Poetry.

In 2015, Anhui University purchased a group of looted manuscripts dating to c. 330 BC (during the Warring States period), among which is one of the oldest extant scribal copies of the Classic of Poetry (at least part of it). The manuscript has been published in the first volume of this collection of manuscripts, Anhui daxue cang Zhanguo zhujian (安徽大學藏戰國竹簡).

=== Compilation ===
The Confucian school eventually came to consider the verses of the "Airs of the States" to have been collected in the course of activities of officers dispatched by the Zhou dynasty court, whose duties included the field collection of the songs local to the territorial states of Zhou. This territory was roughly the Yellow River Plain, Shandong, southwestern Hebei, eastern Gansu, and the Han River region. Perhaps during the harvest. After the officials returned from their missions, the king was said to have observed them himself in an effort to understand the current condition of the common people. The well-being of the people was of special concern to the Zhou because of their ideological position that the right to rule was based on the benignity of the rulers to the people in accordance with the will of Heaven, and that this Heavenly Mandate would be withdrawn upon the failure of the ruling dynasty to ensure the prosperity of their subjects. The people's folksongs were deemed to be the best gauge of their feelings and conditions, and thus indicative of whether the nobility was ruling according to the mandate of Heaven or not. Accordingly, the songs were collected from the various regions, converted from their diverse regional dialects into standard literary language, and presented accompanied with music at the royal courts.

=== Confucius ===
The Classic of Poetry historically has a major place in the Four Books and Five Classics, the canonical works associated with Confucianism. Some pre-Qin dynasty texts, such as the Analects and a recently excavated manuscript from 300 BCE entitled "Confucius' Discussion of the Odes", mention Confucius' involvement with the Classic of Poetry but Han dynasty historian Sima Qian's Records of the Grand Historian was the first work to directly attribute the work to Confucius. Subsequent Confucian tradition held that the Shijing collection was edited by Confucius from a larger 3,000-piece collection to its traditional 305-piece form. This claim is believed to reflect an early Chinese tendency to relate all of the Five Classics in some way or another to Confucius, who by the 1st century BCE had become the model of sages and was believed to have maintained a cultural connection to the early Zhou dynasty. This view is now generally discredited, as the Zuo Zhuan records that the Classic of Poetry already existed in a definitive form when Confucius was just a young child.

In works attributed to him, Confucius comments upon the Classic of Poetry in such a way as to indicate that he holds it in great esteem. A story in the Analects recounts that Confucius' son Kong Li told the story: "The Master once stood by himself, and I hurried to seek teaching from him. He asked me, 'You've studied the Odes?' I answered, 'Not yet.' He replied, 'If you have not studied the Odes, then I have nothing to say.'"

=== Han dynasty ===
According to Han tradition, the Poetry and other classics were targets of the burning of books in 213 BCE under Qin Shi Huang, and the songs had to be reconstructed largely from memory in the subsequent Han period. However the discovery of pre-Qin copies showing the same variation as Han texts, as well as evidence of Qin patronage of the Poetry, have led modern scholars to doubt this account.

During the Han period there were three different versions of the Poetry which each belonged to different hermeneutic traditions. The Lu Poetry (魯詩; Lǔ shī), the Qi Poetry (齊詩; Qí shī) and the Han Poetry (韓詩; Hán shī) were officially recognized with chairs at the Imperial Academy during the reign of Emperor Wu of Han (156–87 BCE). Until the later years of the Eastern Han period, the dominant version of the Poetry was the Lu Poetry, named after the state of Lu, and founded by Shen Pei, a student of a disciple of the Warring States period philosopher Xunzi.

The Mao Tradition of the Poetry (毛詩傳; Máo shī zhuàn), attributed to an obscure scholar named Máo Hēng (毛亨) who lived during the 2nd or 3rd centuries BCE, was not officially recognized until the reign of Emperor Ping (1 BCE to 6 CE). However, during the Eastern Han period, the Mao Poetry gradually became the primary version. Proponents of the Mao Poetry said that its text was descended from the first generation of Confucius' students, and as such should be the authoritative version. Xu Shen's influential dictionary Shuowen Jiezi, written in the 2nd-century CE, quotes almost exclusively from the Mao Poetry. Finally, the renowned Eastern Han scholar Zheng Xuan used the Mao Poetry as the basis for his annotated 2nd-century edition of the Poetry. Zheng Xuan's edition of the Mao text was itself the basis of the "Right Meaning of the Mao Poetry" (毛詩正義; Máo shī zhèngyì) which became the imperially authorized text and commentary on the Poetry in 653 CE.

By the 5th-century, the Lu, Qi, and Han traditions had died out, leaving only the Mao Poetry, which has become the received text in use today. Only isolated fragments of the Lu text survive, among the remains of the Xiping Stone Classics.

== Legacy ==
=== Confucian allegory ===
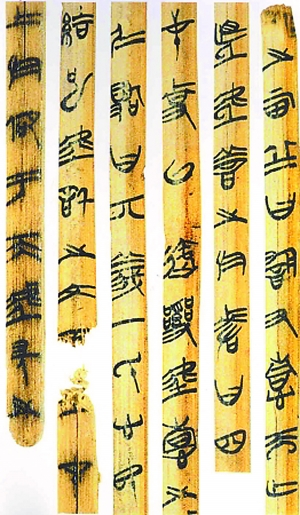
Part of the Kǒngzǐ Shīlùn (孔子詩論), an early discussion of the Classic of Poetry

The Book of Odes has been a revered Confucian classic since the Han dynasty, and has been studied and memorized by centuries of scholars in China. The individual songs of the Odes, though frequently on simple, rustic subjects, have traditionally been saddled with extensive, elaborate allegorical meanings that assigned moral or political meaning to the smallest details of each line. The popular songs were seen as good keys to understanding the troubles of the common people, and were often read as allegories, and complaints against lovers were seen as complaints against faithless rulers. Confucius taught that the Odes were a valuable focus for knowledge and self-cultivation, as recorded in an anecdote in the Analects:

The Odes can be a source of inspiration and a basis for evaluation; they can help you to come together with others, as well as to properly express complaints. In the home, they teach you about how to serve your father, and in public life they teach you about how to serve your lord. They also broadly acquaint you with the names of birds, beasts, plants, and trees.

詩可以興，可以觀，可以群，可以怨。邇之事父，遠之事君。多識於鳥獸草木之名。

— Analects, chapter 17 (Edward Slingerland, trans.)

The extensive allegorical traditions associated with the Odes were theorized by Herbert Giles to have begun in the Warring States period as a justification for Confucius' focus upon such a seemingly simple and ordinary collection of verses. These elaborate, far-fetched interpretations seem to have gone completely unquestioned until the 12th century, when scholar Zheng Qiao (鄭樵, 1104–1162) first wrote his scepticism of them. European sinologists like Giles and Marcel Granet ignored these traditional interpretations in their analysis of the original meanings of the Odes. Granet, in his list of rules for properly reading the Odes, wrote that readers should "take no account of the standard interpretation", "reject in no uncertain terms the distinction drawn between songs evicting a good state of morals and songs attesting to perverted morality", and "[discard] all symbolic interpretations, and likewise any interpretation that supposes a refined technique on the part of the poets". These traditional allegories of politics and morality are no longer seriously followed by any modern readers in China or elsewhere.

=== Political influence ===
The Odes became an important and controversial force, influencing political, social and educational phenomena. During the struggle between Confucian, Legalist, and other schools of thought, the Confucians used the Shijing to bolster their viewpoint. On the Confucian side, the Shijing became a foundational text which informed and validated literature, education, and political affairs. The Legalists, on their side, attempted to suppress the Shijing by violence, after the Legalist philosophy was endorsed by the Qin dynasty, prior to their final triumph over the neighboring states: the suppression of Confucian and other thought and literature after the Qin victories and the start of Burning of Books and Burying of Scholars era, starting in 213 BCE, extended to attempt to prohibit the Shijing.

As the idea of allegorical expression grew, when kingdoms or feudal leaders wished to express or validate their own positions, they would sometimes couch the message within a poem, or by allusion. This practice became common among educated Chinese in their personal correspondences and spread to Japan and Korea as well.

=== Modern scholarship ===
Modern scholarship on the Classic of Poetry often focuses on doing linguistic reconstruction and research in Old Chinese by analyzing the rhyme schemes in the Odes, which show vast differences when read in modern Mandarin Chinese. Although preserving more Old Chinese syllable endings than Mandarin, Modern Cantonese and Min Nan are also quite different from the Old Chinese language represented in the Odes.

C.H. Wang refers to the account of King Wu's victory over the Shang dynasty in the "Major Court Hymns" as the "Weniad" (a name that parallels The Iliad), seeing it as part of a greater narrative discourse in China that extols the virtues of wén (文 "literature, culture") over more military interests.

=== Marquis of Haihun's tomb ===
A copy of the Book of Songs was recently found in the Marquis of Haihun's tomb (Chinese: 海昏侯墓; pinyin: Hǎihūn hóu mù) in Jiangxi Province. This find from a Chinese imperial tomb includes bamboo slips that form a nearly intact edition.

== Contents list ==
Summary of groupings of poems from the Classic of Poetry

Guofeng (simplified Chinese: 国风; traditional Chinese: 國風; pinyin: Guófēng) "Airs of the States", poems 001–160
| group | char | group name | poem #s |
|---|---|---|---|
| 01 | 周南 | Odes of Zhou & South | 001–011 |
| 02 | 召南 | Odes of Shao & South | 012–025 |
| 03 | 邶風 | Odes of Bei | 026–044 |
| 04 | 鄘風 | Odes of Yong | 045–054 |
| 05 | 衛風 | Odes of Wei | 055–064 |
| 06 | 王風 | Odes of Wang | 065–074 |
| 07 | 鄭風 | Odes of Zheng | 075–095 |
| 08 | 齊風 | Odes of Qi | 096–106 |
| 09 | 魏風 | Odes of Wei | 107–113 |
| 10 | 唐風 | Odes of Tang | 114–125 |
| 11 | 秦風 | Odes of Qin | 126–135 |
| 12 | 陳風 | Odes of Chen | 136–145 |
| 13 | 檜風 | Odes of Kuai | 146–149 |
| 14 | 曹風 | Odes of Cao | 150–153 |
| 15 | 豳風 | Odes of Bin | 154–160 |

Xiao Ya (Chinese: 小雅; pinyin: Xiǎoyǎ) "Lesser Court Hymns" poems 161–234
| group | char | group name | poem #s |
|---|---|---|---|
| 01 | 鹿鳴 之什 | Decade of Lu Ming | 161–169 |
| 02 | 白華 之什 | Decade of Baihua | 170–174 |
| 03 | 彤弓 之什 | Decade of Tong Gong | 175–184 |
| 04 | 祈父 之什 | Decade of Qi Fu | 185–194 |
| 05 | 小旻 之什 | Decade of Xiao Min | 195–204 |
| 06 | 北山 之什 | Decade of Bei Shan | 205–214 |
| 07 | 桑扈 之什 | Decade of Sang Hu | 215–224 |
| 08 | 都人士 之什 | Decade of Du Ren Shi | 225–234 |

Da Ya (Chinese: 大雅; pinyin: Dàyǎ) "Major Court Hymns" poems 235–265; 31 total major festal songs (湮捇) for solemn court ceremonies
| group | char | group name | poem #s |
|---|---|---|---|
| 01 | 文王之什 | Decade of Wen Wang | 235–244 |
| 02 | 生民之什 | Decade of Sheng Min | 245–254 |
| 03 | 蕩之什 | Decade of Dang | 255–265 |

Song (simplified Chinese: 颂; traditional Chinese: 頌; pinyin: Sòng) "Eulogies" poems 266–305; 40 total praises, hymns, or eulogies sung at spirit sacrifices
| group | char | group name | poem #s |
|---|---|---|---|
| 01 | 周頌 | Sacrificial Odes of Zhou | 266–296 |
| 01a | 清廟之什 | Decade of Qing Miao | 266–275 |
| 01b | 臣工之什 | Decade of Chen Gong | 276–285 |
| 01c | 閔予小子之什 | Decade of Min You Xiao Zi | 286–296 |
| 02 | 魯頌 | Praise Odes of Lu | 297–300 |
| 03 | 商頌 | Sacrificial Odes of Shang | 301–305 |

Note: alternative divisions may be topical or chronological (Legge): Song, Daya, Xiaoya, Guofeng

== Notable translations ==
- Legge, James (1871). The She-king, or the Lessons from the States. The Chinese Classics. Vol. 4. Part 1, Part 2. rpt. Hong Kong: Hong Kong University Press (1960).
- —— (1876). The She king, or The Book of Ancient Poetry (PDF). London: Trübner. Archived from the original (PDF) on 2014-04-12.
- —— (1879). The Shû king. The religious portions of the Shih king. The Hsiâo king. The Sacred Books of China. Vol. 3. Oxford, The Clarendon press.
- Lacharme, P. (1830). Confucii Chi-King sive Liber Carminum. Sumptibus J.G. Cottae. Latin translation.
- Jennings, William (1891). The Shi King: The Old "Poetry Classic" of the Chinese.; rpt. New York: Paragon (1969).
- (in French and Latin) Couvreur, Séraphin (1892). Cheu-king; Texte chinois avec une double traduction en français et en Latin [Shijing; Chinese Text With a Double Translation in French and Latin]. Hokkien: Mission Catholique.
- Granet, Marcel (1929). Fêtes et chansons anciennes de la Chine (in French). Paris. Translated into English by E. D. Edwards (1932), Festivals and Songs of Ancient China, New York: E.P. Dutton.
- Waley, Arthur (1937). The Book of Songs. London: Allen & Unwin. ISBN 9780802134776. Rpt. New York: Grove Press, 1996, with a Preface by Joseph Allen. ISBN 0802134777.
- Karlgren, Bernhard (1950). The Book of Odes (PDF). Stockholm: Museum of Far Eastern Antiquities. Reprint of
  - Karlgren, Bernhard (1944). "The Book of Odes: Kuo Feng and Siao Ya". Bulletin of the Museum of Far Eastern Antiquities. 16: 171–256.
  - Karlgren, Bernhard (1945). "The Book of Odes: Ta Ya and Sung". Bulletin of the Museum of Far Eastern Antiquities. 17: 65–99.
- Pound, Ezra (1954). The Confucian Odes: The Classic Anthology Defined by Confucius. Cambridge, Mass.: Harvard University Press.
- Takada, Shinji 高田真治 (1966). Shikyō 詩経 (in Japanese). Tokyo: Shūeisha.
- (in Mandarin Chinese) Cheng Junying 程俊英 (1985). Shijing Yizhu 诗经译注 [Shijing, Translated and Annotated]. Shanghai: Shanghai Guji Chubanshe and
- (in Mandarin Chinese) Cheng Junying 程俊英 (1991). Shijing Zhuxi 詩經注析 [Shijing, Annotation and Analysis]. Zhonghua Publishing House.
- (in Japanese) Mekada, Makoto 目加田誠 (1991). Shikyō 詩経. Tokyo: Kōbansha.
- Vincenzo, Cannata (2021). Il Libro delle Odi: edizione integrale. Milano, Italy: Luni Editrice.

== See also ==
- Chinese classics
- Classical Chinese poetry
- Geese in Chinese poetry
- "Guan ju"
- Chengyu
- Chinese art
