= Martin Kern (sinologist) =

German-American sinologist

- Born: 1962 (age 63–64)

Academic background
- Education: Peking University
- Alma mater: University of Cologne
- Thesis: Die Hymnen der chinesischen Staatsopfer (1996)

Academic work
- Discipline: Sinology
- Sub-discipline: Chinese poetry and literature

Martin Kern (Chinese: 柯马丁; pinyin: Kē Mǎdīng) is a German-American sinologist, specializing in Chinese literature, poetry, literary thought, philology, and historiography. He served as co-editor of the sinological journal T'oung Pao from 2009 through 2024.

== Biography ==
Martin Kern was born in Germany in 1962, where he attended school. He began study at the University of Cologne in 1985, before taking several years to study as an exchange student at Peking University. He returned to Cologne, where received his M.A. in 1992 and his Ph.D. (in sinology, German literature, and art history) four years later.

After receiving his doctorate, Kern briefly taught as a visiting lecturer at the University of Washington and as an assistant professor at Columbia University. In 2000, he became an assistant professor of Chinese Literature at Princeton University. He advanced to an associate professorship in 2003, and a full professorship in 2005. In 2017, he became the founding director of the International Center for the Study of Ancient Text Cultures at the Renmin University of China in Beijing. Kern's research focuses on Chinese literature, poetry, literary thought, historiography, and philology, as well as the history of Sinology as a field.

Kern is a member of the American Philosophical Society. He was vice president of the American Oriental Society in 2022–2023 and president in 2023–2024. He was awarded a Guggenheim Fellowship in 2018 for a monograph project on the early history of Chinese poetry. He served as co-editor of the sinological journal T'oung Pao from 2009 through 2024.

== Bibliography ==
=== As author ===
- Zum Topos „Zimtbaum“ in der chinesischen Literatur: Rhetorische Funktion und poetischer Eigenwert des Naturbildes kuei [The Topos of the “Cinnamon Tree” in Chinese Literature: Rhetorical Function and Poetic Value of the Nature Image gui]. Stuttgart: Franz Steiner, 1994.
- Die Hymnen der chinesischen Staatsopfer: Literatur und Ritual in der politischen Repräsentation von der Han-Zeit bis zu den Sechs Dynastien [The Hymns of the Chinese State Sacrifices: Literature and Ritual in Political Representation from Han Times to the Six Dynasties]. Stuttgart: Franz Steiner, 1997.
- The Stele Inscriptions of Ch’in Shih-huang: Text and Ritual in Early Chinese Imperial Representation. New Haven: American Oriental Society, 2000.
- Qin Shihuang shike: zaoqi Zhongguo de wenben yu yishi (秦始皇石刻：早期中國帝國表現中的文本與儀式) [Chinese translation of The Stele Inscriptions of Ch’in Shih-huang: Text and Ritual in Early Chinese Political Representation]. Shanghai: Shanghai Guji Chubanshe, 2015.
- Biaoyan yu chanshi: Zaoqi Zhongguo shixue yanjiu (表演與闡釋：早期中國詩學研究) [Performance and Interpretation: Studies in Early Chinese Poetics]. Beijing: Sanlian Publishers, 2023.

=== As editor ===
- Text and Ritual in Early China, ed. Martin Kern. Seattle: University of Washington Press, 2005.
- Statecraft and Classical Learning: The Rituals of Zhou in East Asian History, ed. Benjamin A. Elman and Martin Kern. Leiden: Brill, 2009.
- Ideology of Power and Power of Ideology in Early China, ed. Yuri Pines, Paul Rakita Goldin, and Martin Kern. Leiden: Brill, 2015.
- Shiji xue yu shijie hanxue lunji xubian (史記學與世界漢學論集續編) [Essays in Shiji Studies and World Sinology, Second Series], ed. Martin Kern and Lee Chi-hsiang. Taipei: Tangshan chubanshe/Tonsan Publications, 2016.
- Origins of Chinese Political Philosophy: Studies in the Composition and Thought of the Shangshu (Classic of Documents), ed. Martin Kern and Dirk Meyer. Leiden: Brill, 2017.
- Confucius and the Analects Revisited: New Perspectives on Dating, Composition, and Authorship, ed. Michael Hunter and Martin Kern. Leiden: Brill, 2018.
- Qu Yuan and the Chuci: New Approaches, ed. Martin Kern and Stephen Owen. Leiden: Brill, 2023.
- Zuozhuan and Early Chinese Historiography, ed. Yuri Pines, Martin Kern, and Nino Luraghi. Leiden: Brill, 2023.
