= Shanghai Museum bamboo slips =

Collection of ancient Chinese texts

- 上海博物館藏戰國楚竹書
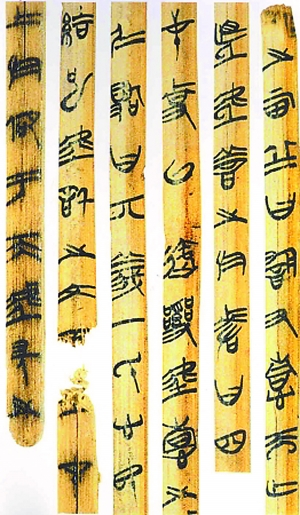
- Material: bamboo
- Writing: Chinese
- Present location: Shanghai Museum

The Shanghai Museum bamboo strips (Chinese: 上海博物館藏戰國楚竹書; pinyin: Shànghǎi Bówùguǎn cáng Zhànguó Chǔ zhúshū; lit. 'Shanghai Museum-held Warring States Chu bamboo books') is a collection of ancient Chinese texts from the Chu state dating to the Warring States period and written in ink on strips of bamboo. The texts originated through illegal excavation, probably of a tomb in Hubei or Hunan province. They appeared on the Hong Kong market in 1994, and were acquired by the Shanghai Museum. The large size of the collection and the significance of the texts for scholarship make it one of the most important discoveries of early Chinese texts.

The manuscripts have been published in nine volumes by the Shanghai Museum starting in 2001, under the supervision of Ma Chengyuan (Chinese: 馬承源).

== Transcription ==
The text shown on the right, reading downwards and from right to left (with punctuation and damaged characters added) is:

...之。
《宛丘》曰：『詢又情，而亡望』，吾善之
《於差》曰：『四矢弁，㠯御亂』，吾憙之
《𡰥鳩》曰：『丌義一氏，心女結也』，吾信之。
《文王》曰：『文王才上，於卲于天』，吾𡵂之。

== See also ==
- Guodian Chu Slips
- Shuanggudui
- Yinqueshan Han Slips
- Zhangjiashan Han bamboo texts
- Tsinghua Bamboo Slips
