= Yubu =

Mystic dance step of religious Daoism

Chinese name
- Chinese: 禹步
- Literal meaning: Yu's step/pace
Transcriptions
Standard Mandarin
- Hanyu Pinyin: Yǔbù
- Wade–Giles: Yü-pu
Yue: Cantonese
- Yale Romanization: Jyu^{5}bou^{6}

Korean name
- Hangul: 우보
Transcriptions
- Revised Romanization: Ubo
- McCune–Reischauer: Ubo

Japanese name
- Kanji: 禹步
- Hiragana: うほ
Transcriptions
- Revised Hepburn: Uho

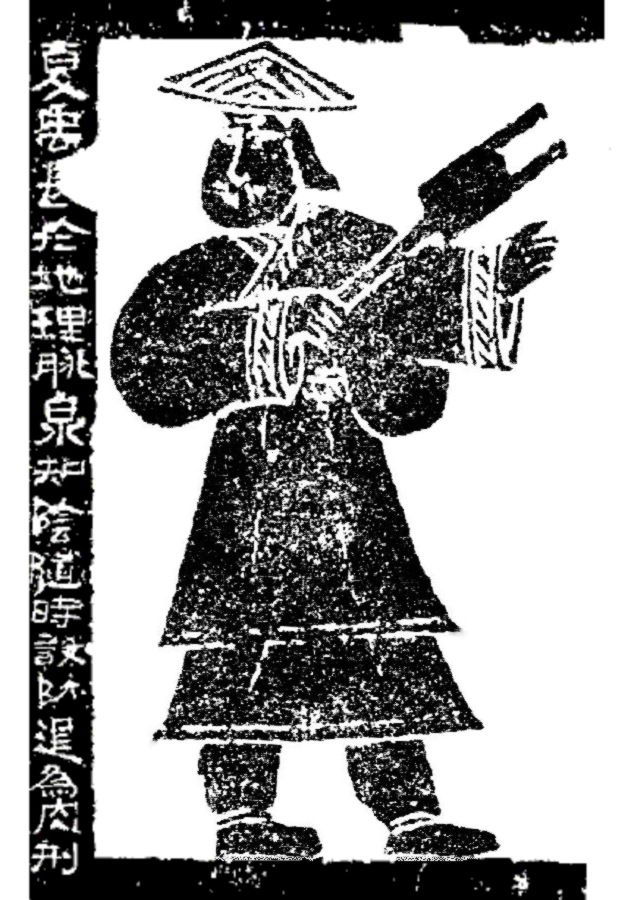
Han Dynasty depiction of Yu

Yubu, translated as Pace(s) of Yu or Step(s) of Yu, is the basic mystic dance step of religious Daoism. This ancient walking or dancing technique typically involves dragging one foot after another, and is explained in reference to the legendary Yu the Great, who became lame on one side of his body from exerting himself while establishing order in the world after the Great Flood. Daoist religions, especially during the Six Dynasties period (220–589), incorporated Yubu into rituals, such as the Bugang 步罡 "pace the Big Dipper", in which a Taoist priest would symbolically walk the nine stars of the Beidou 北斗 "Big Dipper" in order to acquire that constellation's supernatural energy.

== Terminology ==
The term Yubu 禹步, defined as boxing 跛行 "limp; walk lame", compounds two Chinese words.

Yu 禹 was the legendary founder of the Xia dynasty (c. 2070 BCE-c. 1600 BCE), and worked so long and hard fighting the mythical Great Flood that he became partially paralyzed. Yu was also called Dayu 大禹 (with 大 "big; great") or Xiayu 夏禹 (with 夏 "Xia dynasty").

The (121 CE) Shuowen Jiezi gives the earliest Chinese dictionary definition of yu 禹: "a "bug; reptile", from the "animal trampling tracks" radical, a "pictograph" (蟲也从厹象形). The bronzeware script for 禹 depicts a head, legs, and tail. Shuowen commentators interpret this as meaning qu 齲 (clarified with the 齒 "teeth" radical) "decayed and missing teeth; bad teeth".

Axel Schuessler reconstructs Old Chinese *waʔ 禹 "insect; reptile", and gives an etymology from Proto-Tibeto-Burman *was "bee; honey" or Proto-Waic *wak "insect" (cf. Proto-Palaungic *ʋaːk).

Bu 步 means " walk; step; stride; tread; pace (off)". In this Chinese character 步, the top element is 止 "foot" and the bottom was originally 止 backwards. Early bronzeware and oracle script characters depicted bu 步 as a "left foot" and "right foot".

Schuessler reconstructs Old Chinese *bâh 步, which has Sino-Tibetan cognates of Mru pak "go; walk" and Lushai vaak^{F} / vaʔ^{L} "go; walk". Thus, two millennia ago, the ancient Chinese pronounced Yubu something like *waʔbâh.

Yubu "Yu steps" is related to the words Yuxing 禹行 "Yu walk" and Wubu 巫步 "shaman steps" (see the Fayan below). The (3rd century BCE) Confucian classic Xunzi (6) uses the phrase Yuxing er Shunqu 禹行而舜趨 "Yu walk and Shun run" to mock the Confucian disciples of Zizhang 子張: "Their caps bent and twisted, their robes billowing and flowing, they move to and fro as thought they were a Yu or a Shun—such are the base Ru of Zizhang's school." The Korean Buddhist monk and scholar Honggi 洪基 (1822–1881) was also known as Yuxing 禹行.

== Yu myths ==
Traditional Luoshu magic square attributed to Yu.

Modern numerical Luoshu magic square.

Yu the Great is the subject of many mythological stories. Anne Birrell says, "The myth of Yü and the flood is the greatest in the Chinese tradition. This is not just because the narratives tell how he managed to control the flood, but also because numerous myths, legends, and folk tales became attached to his name. In every case, Yü is depicted as a hero, selflessly working on behalf of humankind, and succeeding in his task."

According to early Chinese mythological and historical texts, a Great Flood inundated China during the reign of Emperor Yao (c. 2356 – c. 2255 BCE). Yao appointed Yu's father Gun to control the flooding, and he spent nine years constructing dikes and dams, which collapsed and killed many people. After reigning for one century, Yao abdicated the throne to Shun, the last of the Three Sovereigns and Five Emperors, who fired or killed (according to version) Gun and appointed Yu to replace his father. Yu the Great devised a successful flood control system through undamming rivers, dredging riverbeds, and constructing irrigation canals. In fighting the floods for thirteen years, Yu sacrificed his body, resulting in thick calluses on his hands and feet, and partial paralysis. Shun abdicated the throne to Yu, who founded the Xia dynasty.

The (c. 3rd century BCE) Daoist classic Zhuangzi quotes philosophical rival Mozi, founder of Mohism, to tell the myth of Yu controlling the flood.

Master Mo declared, "Long ago, when Yü was trying to stem the flood waters, he cut channels from the Yangtze and the Yellow rivers and opened communications with the four uncivilized tribes and the nine regions. There were three hundred famous rivers, three thousand branch rivers, and countless smaller ones. Yü personally handled the basket and the shovel, interconnecting the rivers of all under heaven, till there was no down on his calves and no hair on his shins. He was bathed by the pouring rains and combed by the gusting winds as he laid out the myriad states. Yü was a great sage, and he wearied his physical form on behalf of all under heaven like this."

Chinese origin myths have stories about two primordial sage-rulers being divinely inspired by patterns on turtle shells. Fu Xi devised the bagua "eight trigrams" of the Yijing from seeing the Hotu 河圖 "Yellow River Map" on a turtle (or a dragon-horse), and Yu devised the basic magic square from seeing the Luoshu 雒書 "Luo River writing" on a giant turtle shell. "The Great Treatise" commentary to the Yijing has an early reference to the Luoshu.

Heaven creates divine things; the holy sage takes them as models. Heaven and earth change and transform; the holy sage imitates them. In the heavens hang images that reveal good fortune and misfortune; the holy sage reproduces these. The Yellow River brought forth a map and the Lo River brought forth a writing; the holy men took these as models.

The Yijing sub-commentary explains, "The water of the Ho sent forth a dragon horse; on its back there was curly hair, like a map of starry dots. The water of the Lo sent forth a divine tortoise; on its back there were riven veins, like writing of character pictures."

The Luoshu is a 3x3 grid of dots representing the numbers 1-9, with the sum in each of the rows, columns, and diagonals equal to 15 (which is the number of days in each of the 24 solar terms in the traditional Chinese calendar). The Luoshu, also known as the Jiugongtu 九宮圖 "Nine Halls Diagram", is central to Chinese fortune telling and Fengshui. Yu supposedly used the Luoshu to divide ancient China into Nine Provinces; Michael Saso says the "Steps of Yu" dance is thought to ritually imitate Yu's lamely walking throughout the Nine Provinces, stopping the floods, and restoring the order and blessing of nature.

Andersen describes the symbolic relation between Yubu, Steps of Yu, and legends about Yu.

In Chinese mythology Yu is known first of all as the one who regulated the waters after the great flood, a fact he accomplished by walking through the world. His steps provide the exemplary model for the ritual form of Yubu. The flood may be equated with primordial chaos or, in a more synchronic mode of thought, the chaos underlying the existing state of order. And the cosmic order established by Yu may be identified with the societal order instituted by the emperor in accordance with the patterns of the universe.

Thus, one explanation for the Yubu is as a ritual reenactment in imitation of Yu's gait as the lamed flood-hero. An alternative origin myth for the Yu Pace is that Yu himself invented it, inspired by the movements of a divine bird; and, that when Yu assembled the gods together, he used this dance.

Donald Harper says, "Forms of magic related to Yu 禹, the flood hero and legendary founder of Xia, indicate his importance in Warring States magico-religious and occult traditions. Yu's legendary circumambulation and pacification of a world in chaos appear to have made Yu the archetypal pacifier of the spirit world that continued to exist alongside mankind."

== Classical texts ==
The Chinese classics provide important information about Yubu "Paces of Yu".

=== Shizi ===
The (c. 3rd-4th century CE) Shizi 尸子 "Writings of Master Shi", which is attributed to the Syncretist philosopher Shi Jiao 尸佼 (c. 390–330 BCE) could contain one of the first references to Yubu. The "Ruler's Governance" chapter says,

Formerly, (when) the Longmen (Mountains) were not yet opened up (for crossing), and the Lüliang (Mountains) were not yet tunneled through, the (Huang) river emerged from high in the Mengmen (Mountains). (It) greatly overflowed (until it) backed up, (until) there were no hills or mounds (left unsubmerged), (until even) tall hillocks were destroyed by it: (this was) called the flood. Yu thereupon dredged the Huang and Jiang rivers, and for ten years did not (even) glance at his home. (He worked so hard that his) hands had no nails and (his) lower legs had no hair. (He) contracted a partial-paralysis sickness, (such that when he) walked (one foot could) not step past the other, which people (thereafter) called the "Pace of Yu". [君治, 禹於是疏河决江十年未闞其家手不爪脛不毛生偏枯之疾步不相過人曰禹步] Yu had a long neck and a (mouth like a) bird’s beak, and (his) face was likewise ugly, (but) the world followed him and considered him a worthy and enjoyed learning (from him).

Fischer calls this "one of the most famous stories in all of Chinese mythology", and notes the "'Pace of Yu' would go on to have an important place in early medicine and later Daoist ritual."

This descriptive term is Chinese pianku 偏枯 "paralyzed on one side, hemiplegia".

=== Fayan ===
The Exemplary Sayings (Fa yan 法言) by Yang Xiong mentions Yu (using his surname, Sishi 姒氏 "Mr. Si) and the early physician Bian Que (d. 310 BCE) as examples of falsely borrowing names.

In the past, Yu controlled the waters flooding the land, and now shamans dance the many Steps of Yu. Bian Qiao was a man of Lu, and now many healers and called men of Lu. Those who want to sell what is fake inevitably borrow from the genuine. [昔者姒氏治水土而巫步多禹] (10)

Since the original literally reads "[wubu 巫步] "shaman's steps" many Yu", an alternate translation is: "Formerly Sishi 姒氏 (i.e., Yu) regulated the waters and the earth, and the steps of shamans in many cases are those of Yu".

The French sinologist Marcel Granet hypothesized that Yubu dancing, which enabled Daoist priests to achieve a state of trance and become the instrument of a spirit, derived from ancient Wu (shaman) techniques of ecstasy, such as tiaoshen 跳神 (lit. "jump spirit") "perform a shaman's trance-dance".

=== Baopuzi ===
Yijing Hexagram 63, Jiji 既濟 "Already Fording".

Ge Hong's (c. 320 CE) Daoist classic Baopuzi contains some of the earliest and most detailed descriptions of the Paces of Yu, in which "each pace comprises three steps, and the movement thus appears like the waddle of a three-legged creature". The three paces of Yubu were associated with the performer's movement through the three levels of the cosmos, the Santai 三台 "Three Steps; stars within Ursa Major" (ι UMa through 61 UMa) in Chinese astronomy, and the Three Steps of Vishnu across earth, air, and heaven in the Rigveda.

The fact that already in the early Han dynasty, the steps seem to have been connected with the three pairs of stars that are situated under the Northern Dipper and referred to as the Three Steps (santai 三台), or the Celestial Staircase (tianjie 天階), would seem to support this. It would appear, in other words, that even in this early period the Paces of Yu constituted a close parallel to the three Strides Viṣṇu in early Vedic mythology, which are thought to have taken the god through the three levels of the cosmos (thereby establishing the universe), and which indeed, just like the Paces of Yu in Taoist ritual, are known to have been imitated by Vedic priests as they approached the altar—and in the same form as the Paces of Yu, that is, dragging one foot after the other.

The Big Dipper had central importance in Han cosmology, and was seen as the instrument of the emperor of heaven, Taiyi 太一, who resides in the bright, reddish star Kochab (Beta Ursae Minoris) near the pole of heaven. In the so-called "apocryphal texts" or weishu 緯書 "glosses on the classics that allege esoteric meanings", the Big Dipper or Shendou 神斗 "Divine Dipper" is described as, "the throat and tongue of heaven", which "contains the primordial breath and dispenses it by means of the Dipper".

The Baopuzi "Genie's Pharmacopoeia" chapter tells Daoist adepts how to go into the mountains and gather supernatural, invisible shizhi 石芝 "rock mushrooms/excrescences".

Whenever excrescences are encountered, an initiating and an exorcising amulet are placed over them, then they can no longer conceal or transform themselves. Then patiently await the lucky day on which you will offer a sacrifice of wine and dried meat, and then pluck them with a prayer on your lips, always approaching from the east using Yü's Pace and with your vital breaths well retained.

Yü' s Pace: Advance left foot, then pass it with the right. Bring the left up to the right foot. Advance right foot, then pass it with the left. Bring the right up to the left foot. Advance left foot, then pass it with the right. Bring the left up to the right foot. In this way three paces are made, a total of 21 linear feet, and nine footprints will be made. (11)

The "Into Mountains: Over Streams" chapter describes Yubu as an element in the Daoist astrological celestial stem-based "magic invisibility" system of Qimen Dunjia "Irregular Gate, Hidden Stem". The Dunjia 遁甲 "Hidden Stem" calculates the position within the space-time structure of the liuding 六丁("six ding") "spirits that define the place of the Qimen 奇門 "Irregular Gate". Andersen says, "This gate represents a "crack in the universe," so to speak, which must be approached through performing the Paces of Yu, and through which the adept may enter the emptiness of the otherworld and thereby achieve invisibility to evil spirits and dangerous influences."

"When entering a famous mountain in search of the divine process leading to geniehood, choose one of the six kuei [六癸] days and hours, also known as Heaven-public Days, and you will be sure to become a genie." Again, "On the way to the mountains or forests you must take some superior ch'ing-lung [青龍] grass in your left hand, break it and place half under feng-hsing [逢星]. Pass through the ming-t'ang [明堂] and enter yin-chung [陰中]. Walking with Yü's Pace, pray three times as follows: 'May Generals No-kao and T'ai-yin [諾皋大陰] open the way solely for me, their great-grandson, so-and-so by name. Let it not be opened for others. If anyone sees me, he is to be considered a bundle of grass; those that do not see me, non-men.' Then break the grass that you are holding and place it on the ground. With the left hand take some earth and apply it to the first man in your group. Let the right hand take some grass with which to cover itself, and let the left hand extend forward. Walk with Yü's Pace, and on attaining the Six-Kuei site, hold your breaths and stay where you are. Neither men nor ghosts will be able to see you." As a general rule, the Six Chia [六甲] constitute the ch'ing-lung; the Six I [六乙], the feng-hsing; the Six Ping [六丙], the ming-t'ang; and the Six Ting [六丁], the yin-chung.

"As you proceed with the prescribed Yü's Pace you will keep forming hexagram No. 63. Initial one foot forward, Initial two side by side, Prints not enough. Nine prints are the count, Successively up to snuff. One pace (or three prints) equals seven feet; total, twenty-one feet; and on looking back you will see nine prints."

Method for walking Yu's Pace. Stand straight. Advance the right foot while the left remains behind. Then advance in tum the left foot and the right foot, so that they are both side by side. This constitutes pace No. 1. Advance the right foot, then the left, then bring the right side by side with the left. This constitutes pace No. 2. Advance the left foot, then the right, then bring the left side by side with the right. This constitutes pace No. 3, with which a Yü's Pace is completed. It should be known by all who are practicing the various recipes in our world; it is not enough to know only the recipes. (17)

This Yijing Hexagram 63, Jiji 既濟 "Already Fording" is composed of the trigrams li 離 (☲) Fire and kan 坎 (☵) Water.

=== Da Dai Liji ===
The (c. 2nd century CE) Da Dai Liji 大戴禮記 version of the Yu legend uses a synonym of bu "step; pace; walk": lü 履 "step/tread on; shoes; follow" (also Yijing Hexagram 10 "Treading").

He was the grandson of Gaoyang 高陽 and the son of Gun 鯀. His name was Wenming 文命. He was generous and capable of helping; his virtue was unfailing. Attractive in his humanity and reliable in speech, his voice created the standards of sound and his body those of measure. He was praised as a superior person. Indefatigable and reverent he laid down the basic principles (gang 綱 and ji 紀). He inspected the nine provinces and opened up the nine roads. He dammed the nine marshes and measured the nine mountains. He was the host of the gods, the father and mother of the people. To his left was the level and plumb-line, to his right the compass and square. He set the four seasons in motion (literally, "walked the four seasons," lü sishi 履四時) and took possession of the four seas. He pacified the nine provinces and carried the nine heavens on his head. He made his ears and eyes perceptive and regulated the world. He elevated Gao Yao 臯陶 and Yi 益 to his service. He made use of shield and spear in order to punish the insubordinate and reckless. Within the four seas, wherever boat or cart could reach, all submitted and gave allegiance to him. (62)

This context similarly says Yu's grandfather Gaoyang or Zhuanxu, "walked [the patterns of] time in order to resemble (i.e., be in accordance with) heaven 履時以象天."

In the ideology of the Da Dai liji, which agrees with other ritual classics of the period such as the Liji, Poul Andersen explains, "the walk through the world done by Yu, as well as by other model emperors, is symbolic of the orderly movement of time. It is at the same time a transfer of the patterns of heaven — the movements of the celestial bodies and various divine forces — to earth, as expressed in one of the standard phrases about the mythical emperors, "He carried heaven on his head and walked the earth," daitian lüdi 戴天履地."

=== Cantong qi ===
The (c. 2nd century) Cantong qi neidan "internal alchemy" classic, which is attributed to Wei Boyang, gives the earliest recorded criticism of yubu or bugang.

The Cantong qi section on "Incorrect practices" warns against improper or unproductive Daoist techniques, including performing budouxiu "pace the Dipper asterism" and liujia: "treading the Dipper and pacing the asterisms, using the six jia as markers of time" (履行步斗宿 六甲以日辰).

== Excavated texts ==
The discovery of medical and divinatory books in late Warring States period tomb libraries has confirmed the (c. 320 CE) Baopuzi description of Yubu as a series of three steps. Recent archaeology brought to light manuscripts, written on bamboo and silk, documenting early Yubu practices: the (c. 217 BCE) Rishu and (c. 168 BCE) Wushi'er Bingfang. A third text, the (c. 300 BCE) Chu Silk Manuscript, describes the Great Flood survivors (but not Yu) bu "stepping" to calculate time. The Chinese term zhubo 竹帛 (lit. "bamboo silk") means "bamboo (slips) and silk (for writing); ancient books".

These excavated tomb texts help to confirm Marcel Granet's proposal that Daoist Yubu went back to ancient shamanistic traditions.

Granet pointed to accounts of Yu's lameness in Warring States philosophical texts as indirect evidence of an original shamanic trance-inducing limp like the one described in the Baopuzi. Occurrences of the Pace of Yu in both the Shuihudi and Fangmatan almanacs concern travel, but the Pace of Yu is employed seven times in the Mawangdui Wushier bingfong as part of the magical strategy for exorcising demons blamed for ailments. Granet is surely correct about its shamanic origins. However, the excavated manuscripts show that in the third century B.C., the Pace of Yu had already become part of the fund of magico-religious knowledge regularly employed by the elite. It was probably in this more popular milieu that the Pace of Yu found its way into religious Daoism.

=== Rishu ===
The Rishu 日書 "Day Book" almanac or hemerology is one of the Shuihudi Qin bamboo texts recovered in 1975 in Shuihudi, Hubei, from a tomb dated 217 BCE. Donald Harper believes that for describing texts like the Rishu 日書, which determine lucky and unlucky days on sexagenary cycle numerology without reference to astrology, "hemerology" is a more accurate translation than "almanac" (typically meaning an annual publication for a single calendar year).

The Rishu has one occurrence of Yubu san 禹步三, "'Steps of Yu, three times", and one of Yubu sanmian 禹步三勉, "Steps of Yu, three exertions". This is consistent with the Baopuzi descriptions of Yubu in terms of sanbu "three steps" and jiuji 九跡, "nine footprints/traces," where each "step" was composed of three separate steps. Andersen notes that the term Sanbu jiuji was later used synonymously with Yubu.

Yu is closely associated with travel in the Rishu. The section titled "Yu xuyu" 禹須臾 "Promptuary/Instant of Yu" begins by listing the stem and branch sexagenary cycle in five groups of twelve signs each, and gives, for the days in each group, a certain lucky time of day to safely begin a journey. This section concludes with a ritual to be performed before going out of the city gate.

When traveling, on reaching the threshold-bar of the capital gate, perform the Pace of Yu thrice. Advance one pace. Call out, "Kǝgw [gao 皋 "name of the spirit being addressed"], I dare make a declaration. Let so-and-so [to be filled in with the name of the traveler] travel and not suffer odium; he first acts as Yu to clear the road." Immediately draw five lines on the ground. Pick up the soil from the center of the lines and put it in your bosom.

Isabelle Robinet says this text lets us reconstruct the connection between "exorcistic practices intended to ward off harmful demons, and therapeutic practices intended to ensure good hygiene and good physical balance", in other words, "the evolution of exorcism toward medicine, a shift from conceiving sickness as caused by demons to seeing sickness as the result of an imbalance".

=== Wushi'er Bingfang ===
The Wushi'er Bingfang 五十二病方 "Remedies for 52 Ailments" is an early medical text written on silk scrolls unearthed in 1974 from No Tomb 3 (dated 168 BCE) in Mawangdui Han tombs site, Hunan. It has seven occurrences of the descriptive phrase Yubu san 禹步三, "'Steps of Yu, three times", which is also seen above in the Rishu.

Andersen describes the cures contained in the Wushi'er bingfang to "comprise various elements, such as the preparation of medicines, the waving of twigs, the spewing of purifying water, and the pronouncing of incantations. The last two elements are often combined with Yubu and in many cases constitute the concluding part of the cure."

=== Chu Silk Manuscript ===
The Chu Silk Manuscript, which is an ancient Chinese astrological and astronomical text from the southern state of Chu, was discovered by grave robbers in a (ca. 300 BCE) Warring States period tomb east of Changsha, Hunan Province. Although this text does not mention Yubu, the "Seasons" section records a deluge myth about the siblings Fu Xi and Nüwa being the only survivors of the Great Flood and their children bu "stepping" to calculate time and seasons.

Long, long ago, Bao Xi of […] came from […] and lived in […]. His […] was […] and […] woman. It was confusing and dark, without […], […] water […] wind and rain were thus obstructed. He then married Zuwei […]'s granddaughter, named Nü Tian. She gave birth to four [… (children)] who then helped put things in motion making the transformations arrive according (to Heaven's plan). Relinquishing (this) duty, they then rested and acted (in turn) controlling the sidewalls (of the calendrical plan); they helped calculate time by steps. The separated (heaven) above and (earth) below. Since the mountains were out of order, they then named the mountains, rivers, and Four Seas. They arranged (themselves) by […] hot and cold qi. In order to cross mountains, rivers and streams (of various types) when there was as yet no sun or moon (for a guide), when the people traveled across mountains and rivers, the four gods stepped in succession to indicate the year; these are the four seasons.

== Present day ==
In contemporary Daoist liturgical rituals, Yubu is commonly seen in bugang performances where the priest paces as a symbolic microcosm of Yu bringing order to the earth.

Edward Schafer explained the "step of Yü" as representing a walk among symbolic stars that injects supernatural energy into the practitioner. By pacing the nine stars of the Dipper, the Daoist priest is able to summon the polar deity Taiyi 太一 "Grand Monad (from which all things sprang)" to receive its power for blessing the community.

The Daoist Lingbao School performed early and theatrical versions of the Yubu.

It takes place on several levels that are, in reality, only one: a microcosm consisting of the sacred area; the macrocosm represented by the trigrams; and the sky, especially the stars of the Dipper. What the participants in the ceremony see is the movements of the priest. He moves to and fro, advancing, twisting, and turning as he dances the Step of Yu; he brandishes the sword that fends off demons; and he moves his fingers to follow the pattern of his feet and imitate their pacing on the Dipper. He is surrounded by acolytes who burn incense, chant the text, and play musical instruments.

Many present-day manuals of Chinese divination contain a whole section describing variants of Yubu and bugang. While the modern emphasis is on divination for the purpose of achieving individual immortality and ascending to heaven, this tradition originated in early Shangqing School texts where the divination was to obtain safety through methods of invisibility.

== See also ==
- Hjaltadans, Scots place name meaning "lame or limping dance"
- Paidushko horo, a Balkan "limping dance"
- Rishu, a Daoist term
- Bugang, Daoist ritual dance
