= Li Ling (disambiguation) =

Li Ling (died 74 BC) was a Han dynasty general who later defected and served the Xiongnu.

Li Ling and Ling Li may also refer to:

People surnamed Li

- Li Ling (sinologist) (born 1948), Chinese sinologist
- Li Ling (Paralympian) (born 1967), Chinese Paralympic track and field athlete
- Li Ling (shot putter) (born 1985), Chinese shot putter
- Li Ling (sailor) (born 1986), Chinese windsurfer
- Li Ling (pole vaulter) (born 1989), Chinese pole vaulter
- Li Ling (netball player) (born 1987), Chinese-born Singaporean netball player
- Li Ling (actress) (born 1958), Chinese actress

People surnamed Ling

- Ling Li (writer) (1942–2018), Chinese writer and historian

== See also ==
- Liling, a county-level city in Hunan, China
