= Yin Yang Shiyi Mai Jiujing =

Ancient Chinese medical text

The Yin Yang Shiyi Mai Jiujing (simplified Chinese: 阴阳十一脉灸经; traditional Chinese: 陰陽十一脈灸經; pinyin: Yīn Yáng Shíyī Mài Jiǔjīng), or Cauterization Canon of the Eleven Yin and Yang Vessels, is an ancient Chinese medical text that was excavated in 1973 from a Han-dynasty tomb in Mawangdui Han tombs site (Hunan province) that had been sealed in 168 BCE. It was handcopied in seal script on the same sheet of silk as the Recipes for Fifty-Two Ailments and another text on cauterization during the Qin dynasty, around 215 BCE. The text describes the pathways of eleven vessels or channels (mai 脉) inside the body, as well as the ailments associated with each vessel. It contains many textual parallels with the later medical text known as the Lingshu, one extant version of the Huangdi Neijing.

== See also ==
- Zubi Shiyi Mai Jiujing
- Jinkui Yaolue
- Wushi'er Bingfang

== Bibliography ==
- Harper, Donald J. (1998), Early Chinese Medical Literature: The Mawangdui Medical Manuscripts, London and New York: Kegan Paul International, ISBN 0-7103-0582-6.
