= Chu Silk Manuscript =

Chinese astrology and astronomy

The Chu Silk Manuscript (traditional Chinese: 楚帛書; simplified Chinese: 楚帛书; pinyin: Chǔ Bóshū; Wade–Giles: Ch'u Po-shu), also known as the Chu Silk Manuscript from Zidanku in Changsha (traditional Chinese: 長沙子彈庫楚帛書; simplified Chinese: 长沙子弹库楚帛书; pinyin: Chángshā Zǐdànkù Chǔ Bóshū; Wade–Giles: Ch'ang-sha Tzu-tan-k'u Ch'u Po-shu), is a Chinese astrological and astronomical text. It was discovered in a (c. 300 BCE) Warring States period tomb from the southern Chinese state of Chu.

== History ==
The provenance of the Chu Silk Manuscript is uncertain, like many illicit antiquities. Sometime between 1934 and 1942, grave robbers discovered it in a tomb near Zidanku (literally "bullet storehouse"), east of Changsha, Hunan. Archaeologists later found the original tomb and dated it to around 300 BCE.

In 1946, the art collector Cai Jixiang (蔡季襄) owned the manuscript. John Hadley Cox then transported it to the United States. How John Hadley Cox acquired the manuscript from Cai Jixiang remains a controversy: Cai claimed that Cox had been asked to help scan the manuscript only; Cai's efforts to have the manuscript returned had persisted till the late 1970s but failed. The philanthropist Arthur M. Sackler purchased the ancient manuscript in 1965, and it is preserved in the Arthur M. Sackler Gallery in Washington, D.C. Papers related to the manuscript can be found at the Freer Gallery of Art and Arthur M. Sackler Gallery Archives.

Recent excavations of Chu-period tombs have discovered historically comparable manuscripts written on fragile bamboo slips and silk – the Chinese word zhúbó (竹帛) means "bamboo slips and silk (for writing); ancient books". The Chu Silk Manuscript was roughly contemporaneous with the (c. 305 BCE) Tsinghua Bamboo Slips and (c. 300 BCE) Guodian Chu Slips, and it preceded the (168 BCE) Mawangdui Silk Texts. Its subject matter predates the (c. 168 BCE) Han Dynasty silk Divination by Astrological and Meteorological Phenomena.

== Content ==
The Chu Silk Manuscript is 47 centimetres (19 in) long and 38 centimetres (15 in) wide, with worn edges and folds. Exposure to light has made some portions dark and unreadable, but infrared photography helped to decipher some illegible portions.

This silken document contains 926 ancient characters in three sections, each of which involves some aspect of the lunisolar Chinese calendar. Li and Cook call them the "Year (Inner Long Text)", "Seasons (Inner Short Text)", and "Months (Surrounding Text)".

The Inner Long and Short Text are alternate blocks, respectively with thirteen lines of text upright and with eight lines inverted (cf. Greek Boustrophedon). Jao Tsung-I proposes the former section is written right side up because it discusses the creation myths of the Chu people, and the latter is upside down because it describes events when heaven is in disarray.

The Surrounding Text in the four margins pictures a color-symbolic tree in each corner plus twelve masked zoomorphic figures with short descriptions. Scholars associate the twelve pictures with the Chu gods for the months and the four trees with the mythic pillars holding up the heavens. The Inner Short Text describes Gong Gong knocking down one heavenly pillar and causing the earth to tilt. Although these twelve figures have no certain interpretation, Loewe reasons, "it seems likely that they may represent twelve guardian gods or holy spirits, severally invested with powers of action for each of the twelve months. Alternatively they may represent twelve shamans or intermediaries, wearing masks and capable of communicating with such deities." Li Xueqin identified these twelve gods with the ancient names for the months given in the Erya (8/15, Chu 陬, Ru 如, Bing 寎, ...). The manuscript's sides represent the four directions and seasons. In traditional Chinese terms, the Four Symbols are the Azure Dragon of the East (青龍), Vermillion Bird of the South (朱雀), White Tiger of the West (白虎), and Black Tortoise of the North (玄武). Each direction is divided into seven sectors, constituting the Twenty-Eight Mansions (二十八宿) of the lunar month.

The Chu Silk Manuscript concerns Chinese astronomy and Chinese astrology, describes the creation myths of Fuxi and Nuwa, and reveals ancient religious perspectives and cosmogony. Li and Cook conclude that, "Generally, the writer of the manuscript was concerned that the calendar be used with proper respect and knowledge. Otherwise, the text threatens, cosmic collapse and evil catastrophic events would occur." Li and Cook identify the design with the shitu (式圖; "cosmic model diagram").

The Chu Silk Manuscript consists of both illustrations and texts; it is designed to resemble a divination board (shi; also sometimes called a diviner's board or cosmograph), which is itself a model of the cosmos. This type of instrument, of which several have been found in Han tombs, consists of a round board symbolizing heaven that can rotate on a pivot on top of a square board representing the earth.

This shi (式; 'model', 'standard', 'form', 'pattern') or shipan (式盤) was the precursor for the luopan (羅盤; "feng shui compass").

== Translations ==
Interpreting the Chu Silk Manuscript's brush-written Chinese characters is especially difficult. Some of these ancient logograms are illegible and some are missing in lacuna. Others are what Barnard calls "descendantless graphs" unidentified with standard characters, which "may reflect something of the Ch'u (written) "dialect" rather than more general characteristics of pre-Han character structures."

Barnard (1973) provided the first English translation of the manuscript, followed by Li & Cook (1999). To illustrate the subject matter, the translated beginning of each section is quoted below. Note that the ellipsis "[...]" marks obliterated or untranslatable characters.

"Year (Inner Long Text)" has three subsections; warning about unnatural events if the months are improperly calibrated, stressing the importance of a proper calendar for an auspicious year from the gods, and cautioning people to respectfully sacrifice to the gods.

If [...] and the length of the lunar months becomes too long or too short, then they will not fit the proper degree and spring, summer, autumn, and winter will [not] be [...] regular; the sun, moon, and planets will erratically overstep their paths. When (the months) are too long, too short, contrary, or chaotic, (the growth of) the grasses and trees have no regularity. This is [called] yao, "demonic" (influences or omens). When heaven and earth create calamities, the Heaven's Cudgel (Tianpou) star creates (sweeping) destruction, sending (the destruction) down through all four regions (of the earth). Mountains collapse, springs gush forth geysers. This is called "contravention." If you contravene the years (and) the months, then upon entering the seventh or eighth day of the month there will be fog, frost, and clouds of dust, and you will not be able to function according (to heaven's plan).

"Seasons (Inner Short Text)" also has three subsections; describing how the gods separated heaven and earth and determined the four seasons, Yandi and Zhu Rong supported the heavens with five pillars of different colors, and Gong Gong divided time into periods, days, months, and years.

Long, long ago, Bao Xi of [...] came from [...] and lived in [...]. His [...] was [...] and [...] woman. It was confusing and dark, without [...], [...] water [...] wind and rain were thus obstructed. He then married Zuwei [...]'s granddaughter, named Nü Tian. She gave birth to four [... (children)] who then helped put things in motion making the transformations arrive according (to Heaven's plan). Relinquishing (this) duty, they then rested and acted (in turn) controlling the sidewalls (of the calendrical plan); they helped calculate time by steps. The separated (heaven) above and (earth) below. Since the mountains were out of order, they then named the mountains, rivers, and Four Seas. They arranged (themselves) by [...] hot and cold qi. In order to cross mountains, rivers and streams (of various types) when there was as yet no sun or moon (for a guide), when the people traveled across mountains and rivers, the four gods stepped in succession to indicate the year; these are the four seasons.

This "stepped" refers to ritual Yubu (禹步; "Steps of Yu", later known as 步罡; bugang; "walking the guideline"). Yu was the legendary founder of the Xia dynasty who controlled the Great Flood's waters and regulated the four seasons.

"Months (Surrounding Text)" in the margins has twelve subsections that picture the monthly gods and list their calendrical rules.

[The first month is called] Qu. (During this month) Yi will come. Do not [...] kill (living beings). Renzi and bingzi are inauspicious (days). If you make [...] and attack to the north, the general will come to evil, [...]. [The month's complete title is] Quyuxia, "Pick from Below".

[The second month is called] Ru. (During this month) you can send out an army and build a city, but you cannot marry off a daughter or take in slaves. Don't regret if you cannot accomplish both. [The month's complete title is] Ruciwu, "Such is Military."
[The third month is called Bing.] (During this month) [...] marry, raise domestic animals, [...]. [The month's complete title is] Bingsichun, "Bing Controls Spring."

In this context, Yi (夷) refers to Dongyi "eastern barbarians", while renzi (壬子) and bingzi (丙子) are names in the sexagenary cycle based on ten Heavenly Stems and twelve Earthly Branches (see the Chinese calendar correspondence table).

== Textual genre ==
Several Chinese classics are comparable with the Chu Silk Manuscript. For instance, Major says it "anticipates later ritual and astrological calendars, such as the "Yueling" [月令 "Monthly Commands"] of the Lüshi chunqiu, in emphasizing the importance of performing certain actions and refraining from others in each month of the year in order to ensure safety and good fortune for the community as a whole."

In addition, Jao compares the manuscript with both the Tianguan shu (天官書; "Essay on Astronomy") in the Records of the Grand Historian and the bamboo Rishu (日書; "Almanacs") from the Chu burials at Yunmeng and the Qin burials at Tianshui.

Within traditional terms for Chinese schools of thought, Li Ling classifies the manuscript as the oldest example of shushu (數術; "numerals and skills"). "Shushu not only includes astronomy and the calendrical and mathematical sciences, but also the various related areas in divination (based on deduction) and physiognomy (based on observation)." Shushu contrasted with fangji (方技; "prescriptions and techniques"), which included traditional Chinese medicine, neidan, daoyin, etc., and both specialties were associated with fangshi "diviners; magicians". "Shushu is primarily related to the universal order (hence, the cosmos), while fangji is primarily related to the human order (hence, the human body)." Li concludes the Chu Silk Manuscript's cosmic model was based on liuren (六壬) or Da Liu Ren (大六壬) calendrical astrology.

== See also ==
- Guodian Chu Slips
- Mawangdui Silk Texts
- Rishu
- Shuanggudui
