= Zubi Shiyi Mai Jiujing =

The Zubi Shiyi Mai Jiujing (simplified Chinese: 足臂十一脉灸经; traditional Chinese: 足臂十一脈灸經; pinyin: Zúbì Shíyī Mài Jiǔjīng), or Cauterization Canon of the Eleven Vessels of the Foot and Forearm, is an ancient Chinese medical text that was excavated in 1973 from a tomb in Mawangdui Han tombs site that was sealed in 168 BCE, under the Han dynasty. It was handcopied in seal script around 215 BCE, under the Qin dynasty, on the same sheet of silk as a longer medical text called Recipes for Fifty-Two Ailments. The Cauterization Canon describes the path of eleven vessels or channels (mai 脉) inside the body and explains how to perform cauterization to treat the ailments associated with each vessel.

== See also ==
- Yin Yang Shiyi Mai Jiujing
- Wushi'er Bingfang

== Bibliography ==
- Harper, Donald J. (1998), Early Chinese Medical Literature: The Mawangdui Medical Manuscripts, London and New York: Kegan Paul International, ISBN 0-7103-0582-6.
