= Huashu =

Daoist classic

The Huashu (simplified Chinese: 化书; traditional Chinese: 化書; pinyin: Huàshū; Wade–Giles: Hua Shu), or The Book of Transformations, is a 930 CE Daoist classic about neidan "internal alchemy", psychological subjectivity, and spiritual transformation. In the description of Poul Andersen,

The Huashu is a unique philosophical work of the period of the Five Dynasties, which syncretizes elements of Taoist, Buddhist, and Confucian thought, and which has been noted in recent times for its scientific observations (for instance regarding optics and acoustics) and for its unusual emphasis on epistemological considerations. Its influence during the Song and subsequent dynasties was substantial, both within Taoist and Confucian metaphysics, and especially as foundation of alchemical thought.

== Authors ==
Authorship of the Huashu is associated with three people. The Southern Tang (937–975 CE) chancellor Song Qiqiu 宋齊丘 first published it under his name, but evidence suggests he plagiarized the Huashu from its primary author Tan Qiao 譚峭, who later scholars confabulated with another roughly contemporaneous Daoist Tan Zixiao 譚紫霄. Didier analyzes the authorship in detail, and believes "one reasonably can conclude only that while T'an Ch'iao wrote the essence of the Hua shu text, Sung edited and also emended it, and in the process corrupted both the structure of and the apparent philosophy expressed through the work."

=== Song Qiqiu ===
Song Qiqiu (宋齐丘; 宋齊丘/邱; Sòng qíqiū; Sung Ch'i-ch'iu; 886–959 CE) was Chancellor of the Southern Tang kingdom, which was one of the Ten Kingdoms. He was born in Luling 廬陵 (present-day Jiangxi), orphaned as a child, and self-educated. While serving as an official in the kingdom of Wu (907–937), he befriended Xu Zhigao 徐知誥, and helped him to establish the Southern Tang and become Emperor Liezu (r. 937–943). Song was appointed to various important administrative posts, including Chancellor on the Left. After the emperor died, Song retired to Mount Jiuhua and was called Jiuhua Xiansheng (九華先生; "Elder of [Mt.] Jiuhua"). Liezu's successor Emperor Yuanzong (r. 943–961) reappointed Song as chancellor and made him Duke of Chu (state). In 958 CE, Song was accused of treason and exiled to Jiuhua, where he hanged himself.

Song wrote a still-extant Huashu preface dated 930 CE and published the book under his name. Beginning in the Song dynasty some editions of the Huashu were titled the Qiqiuzi (齊丘子; "[Book of] Master Qiqiu").

Song Qiqiu's authorship was debunked in the 11th century. The Daoist priest Chen Jingyuan 陳景元 (ca. 1024–1094 CE) published the Huashu with his colophon dated 1060 CE, which records a story that Song stole the book from Tan Qiao. Chen heard this story from his master Zhang Wumeng 張無夢 (fl. ca. 960–1040), who heard it from his master Chen Tuan (871–989) who was a friend of Tan Qiao. This contemporary witness said Tan wrote the Huashu on Mount Zhongnan 終南 (Shaanxi) and met Song Qiqiu while traveling through the capital Nanjing to nearby Mount Mao 茅山, which was the center of Shangqing School "Supreme Clarity" Daoism. Tan said, "The transformations of this book endlessly transform. I want you to preface it and pass it on to later generations." Song edited and published the book under his own name. He was posthumously called Choumiu 醜繆 "Disgraceful Error".

=== Tan Qiao ===
The Huashu was originally written by the Daoist Tan Qiao (simplified Chinese: 谭峭; traditional Chinese: 譚峭; pinyin: Tán Qiào; Wade–Giles: T'an Ch'iao; ca. 860 CE-ca. 940 CE), whom Anderson describes as a "shadowy figure".

The 10th-century Xu xian zhuan (續仙傳; "Continued Biographies of Immortals"), by Shen Fen 沈汾, has the earliest account of Tan Qiao. He was from Quanzhou (in present-day Fujian) and his courtesy name zi (字) was Jingsheng (景升; "Brightness Ascending"). His father Tan Zhu 譚洙, who was a director of the Guozijian "Imperial Academy" during the Tang dynasty (618–907 CE), educated him in the Confucian classics and histories to prepare him for the Imperial examination. Qiao was an excellent student but more interested in the Daoist classics, particularly the hagiographies of xian (仙; "immortals; transcendents"). Tan Qiao left home to study Daoism on Mount Zhongnan and never returned. After travelling through the Sacred mountains of China, he lived for a decade on Mount Song 嵩山 (Henan), where Daoist priests taught him neidan alchemical techniques of bigu (辟穀; "abstention from cereals") and yangqi (養氣; "nourishing qi"), roughly corresponding with Western practices of inedia and breatharianism. "He wore furs in summer and thin garments in winter, and he would often lie about in the snow and rain, to all appearances dead". This compares with the Himalayan tradition of tummo, which is still practiced by the Kagyu school. Tan's father regularly sent him money and clothing, which he promptly spent on wine and gave away. Tan later went south to Mount Nanyue 南岳, or Mount Heng (Hunan), where he allegedly perfected the jindan (金丹; "golden elixir") and could change shape, become invisible, and enter fire or water without being harmed (all Daoist metaphors for xian transcendence). Finally, he travelled to Mount Qingcheng 青城 (Sichuan), where he disappeared.

Some sources confuse Tan Qiao with a more famous Daoist Tan Zixiao; both had the same Chinese surname, both lived in the 10th century, and both traveled in southern China. This mistaken identification began with the Huashu edition in the 1607 CE Daozang supplement Wanli xu daozang (萬歷緒道臧). Its preface notes that Tan Qiao's pseudonym (號; hao was Zixiao Zhenren (紫霄真人; "Perfected Person of the Purple Clouds/Skies"). Lembert and Schenkel translate "The True Man of the Purple Sky"). Later gazetteers and histories repeated this pseudonym, but Zixiao already referred to another Daoist named Tan.

=== Tan Zixiao ===
Tan Zixiao (谭紫霄; 譚紫霄; Tán Zǐxiāo; T'an Tzu-hsiao; ca. 910 CE- ca. 995 CE) was a celebrated Daoist in the Zhengyi Dao 正一 "Orthodox/Correct Unity" School.

Tan's earliest biography is found in the 12th-century Nan Tangshu (南唐書; "History of the Southern Tang") by Ma Ling 馬令 and Lu You 陸游. Tan Zixiao was from Quanzhou (Fujian), which was part of Min (Ten Kingdoms). He was a renowned Daoist priest (道師; daoshi) and shaman (巫; wu), and served at the court of King Wang Chang 王昶 (r. 935–939), who gave Tan the honorific title Zhengyi Xiansheng (正一先生; "Elder of Orthodox/Correct Unity"). After the fall of Min, Tan escaped to Mount Lu (Jiangxi Province) and established the Daoist Qiyin guan (悽隱觀; "Abbey of Dwelling in Concealment"). He supposedly possessed ancient talismans from Zhang Daoling, the founder of the Tianshi Dao "Way of Celestial Masters". Within this school, Tan Zixiao is considered the founder of the Tianxin zhengfa (天心正法; "Correct Methods of the Celestial Heart"), which is an influential Daoist healing tradition that combines Tianshi automatic writing talismans with shamanistic exorcisms. Reflecting the extent of Tan Zixiao's celebrity, Li Yu 李煜, the famous poet and last king of the Southern Tang (r. 961–975 CE), summoned the Daoist priest to court and lavished wealth and honors on him.

Didier definitively establishes that Tan Qiao and Tan Zixiao were two different people, contrasting aspects in each man's period, region, and activities. He concludes that while Tan Qiao was "engaged in internally directed mystical alchemical pursuits in primarily the north between the years 860 and 940", Tan Zixiao "was active in the externally directed work of shamanic ritual manipulations exclusively in the southeast between approximately 910 and 995". Didier further differentiates activities and affiliations of the two Tans. Tan Qiao "was a wandering eccentric engaged in the internally directed pursuit of immortality or perfection who favored loneliness and remote mountain retreats to the political and economic activity pursued by" Tan Zixiao, who "was a professional institutionalized Taoist priest, that is, a priest engaged in externally directed shamanic or sorcerous methods of healing and liturgy for the sake of gaining emolument." In terms of affiliation with schools of religious Daoism, Tan Zixiao's activities derived primarily from the 2nd-century Zhengyi "Orthodox/Correct Unity" sect of the Tianshi "Celestial Masters" movement, which emphasized communal rituals, registers, and talismans; Tan Qiao's heritage was more from the 5th-century southern Shangqing Highest Clarity" tradition, which emphasized personal cultivation, meditation, and visualization.

== Text ==
The received Huashu text contains 110 articles or sections (篇; pian) arranged in 6 chapters (卷; juan), named after types of hua (化; "transformation; change; conversion").

Chapter	Chinese	Pinyin	English Translation	Articles
1	道化	Daohua	Way Transformations	24
2	術化	Shuhua	Techniques Transformations	21
3	德化	Dehua	Potency Transformations	16
4	仁化	Renhua	Humaneness Transformations	17
5	食化	Shihua	Food Transformations	15
6	儉化	Jianhua	Frugality Transformations	17

Most Huashu articles begin with a parable or example and then elaborate upon it. Individual articles are identified by chapter and number, for instance 1.1 Ziji Gong bi (紫極宮碑; "Stele at the Palace of the Purple Ultimate"), 1.2 Sheqiao (蛇雀; "Snakes and Sparrows"), 1.3 Laofeng (老楓; "Old Maple Trees"), 1.4 Ermu (耳目; "Ears and Eyes"). Unlike this 1.1 with four Chinese characters, all the other 109 Huashu titles have two characters, which suggests textual corruption or alteration.

The textual history of the Huashu was analyzed by Didier who differentiated two lines of transmission, the "secular" text originally published under the authorship of Song Qiqiu and the "Daoist" text written by Tan Qiao. The first transmission dates back to Song's 930 CE preface, which describes the Huashu as having 6 chapters and 110 articles. The second textual transmission dates back to Chen Jingyuan's 1060 CE edition of the Huashu credited to Tan Qiao. Didier concludes that in 14th-century China, the book "was widely known and read" and "two of what we might call Hua shu cultures existed, the secular or external and the Taoist/alchemical or internal."

The secular Huashu text, called the Qiqiuzi (齊丘子; "[Book of] Master [Song] Qiqiu") or Song Qiqiu Huashu (宋齊丘化書), is related to the 1144–46 CE Daozang "Daoist Canon" edition of the Huashu. Texts in this lineage have 110 articles, beginning with 1.1 "Stele at the Palace of the Purple Ultimate". The Daoist Huashu text, called the Tanzi (譚子; "[Book of] Master Tan [Qiao]") or Tanzi Huashu (譚子化書), is related to the 1457–1464 Daiwang 代王 (Hubei) government-printed Huashu edition. Texts in this lineage have 109 articles, or 110 beginning with different 1.1 Daohua (道化; "Way Transformations") (also the chapter 1 title) or Shenhua (神化; "Spirit Transformations") titles. Many Huashu editions are currently available, and the Daozang includes two versions (CT 1044 and 1478).

Based on differences among Huashu editions (variant characters, taboo usages, etc.) and a 1023–33 CE text called the Wuhua (五化; "Five Transformations") credited to Tanzi "Master Tan", Didier suggests the original Huashu had 5 chapters instead of 6. This Wuhua closely resembles the Huashu except that it begins "The Utmost Way has five transformations therein" and that the "Way Transformations" (chapter 1 in received texts) subsumes the 5 Huashu chapters "Techniques, Potency, Humaneness, Food, and Frugality Transformations". His hypothesis that the original Huashu text had a quinary instead of sexpartite structure, and that the first chapter was Tan's original preface, is strengthened by the importance of 5 among numbers in Chinese culture. Take for instance the Huashu articles Wuxing (五行; "Five Phases/Elements") (4.2) and Wuchang (五常; "Five Constant [Virtues]") (3.1).

== Title ==
The textual theme and namesake is hua (化; "transform, change, convert, turn into; (physically) melt, dissolve; digest; incinerate; (individually) change into; metamorphose; take the form of; disguise oneself; (Buddhism) reincarnate; (euphemism) die; pass away"). Wenlin interprets this Chinese character, "化 huà depicts a person and a person upside-down. The left side is 亻 (人 rén) 'person'. The right side 匕 was originally 人 upside-down. A person who flips, changes." The closest synonym is bian (變; "change, change into, become; transform; adapt; perform (magic, etc.)"), and their compound is bianhua (變化; "change; vary, variation; metamorphose; transmute"). Two other common hua-compounds are huaxue (化學; 'transformation study'; "chemistry") and wenhua (文化; 'literacy transformation'; "culture; civilization").

Hua "transformations" are a key topic in the Daoist Zhuangzi. For instance, Victor H. Mair translates it as "evolution" in this context.

Nuncle Scattered and Nuncle Slippery were observing the mounds of the Earl of Darkness in the emptiness of K'unlun where the Yellow Emperor rested. Suddenly a willow began to sprout from Nuncle Slippery's left elbow. He looked startled, as though he resented it."Do you resent it?" asked Nuncle Scattered. "No," said Nuncle Slippery. "Why should I resent it? Our lives are just a borrowed pretext. That which we borrow to maintain our lives is merely so much dust. Life and death alternate like day and night. As you and I were observing evolution, it caught up with me. So why should I resent it?

James D. Sellmann elucidates the Daoist significance of hua.

There is no conclusion, no end, no finish for the Zhuangzi. Things transpose, and keep on changing. Therefore, the compassionate meaning and empathic understanding of "transformation" as it is mentioned in the context of the Zhuangzi encompasses each and every thing – in the natural world and the human world. From this perspective, transformation entails a magnitude of meaning, or "spiritual" dimension (in the sense of "high spirits" or "laughter"). Transformation is not just change of form and shape (bian 變) or a change of things and situations (yi 易), but it also entails a complete renewal of the experience of life's meaning (hua 化). Hua provides a way to move through various shapes or bodily forms within a species and across species to merge with each unique perspective, and to experience a mystical continuity with the particulars of nature. In chapter two of the Zhuangzi, the mystical experience is described in these terms; "heaven and earth were born together with me, and the myriad things and I are one" (5/2/52-53). The way hua is played out in the Zhuangzi is very telling, especially in the context of elaborating on the mystical experience.

This 10th-century Huashu "Book of Transformations", written by Tan Qiao and edited by Song Qiqiu, should be distinguished from a similarly titled 13th-century Daoist text — the Wendi huashu (文帝化書; "Book on the Transformations of Lord Wen") or Zitong dijun huashu (梓潼帝君化書; "Book of Transformations of the Divine Lord of Zitong"). It was supposedly revealed in automatic writing in 1181 and 1194 CE, and details the transformations of Wenchang 文昌, patron deity of the literary arts, also known as Zitong dijun 梓潼帝君.

The English title of the Huashu is usually "Book of Transformations" or "Book of Transformation", but it is also translated "Book of Alternations" and "Scripture of Changes" — not to be confused with the Yijing". "Book of Transformations" is used in titles of books about the Yijing and magic, and "Book of Transformation" in one by the Dalai Lama.

== Contents ==
While generations of Chinese literati have studied the Huashu as a philosophical text, notably in terms of Neo-Confucianism, Western scholars are only beginning to appreciate it. Alexander Wylie first described the book, "The 化書 Hwa shoo or "Book of Transformation," written by 譚峭 T'an Seaou in the early part of the 10th century, is an ethical treatise, strongly impregnated with Taouist [sic] tendencies". The earliest European-language translation of the Huashu was in German. Alfred Forke discussed Tan Qiao's philosophy and translated over 20 articles.

Joseph Needham and others studying the history of science and technology in China have rediscovered the Huashu, which Needham called "a work of much importance". (Note: Note that Needham's unusual system of romanization is changed to pinyin, and substitutions are in square brackets. For instance, substituting [Tan Qiao] for "Than Chhiao".)

Evaluating Chinese proto-scientific texts from the Tang and Song dynasties, Needham cites Xingying (形影; "Objects and Images") (1.7),

Of all these books, the most original from the point of view of the philosophy of science is probably the Hua Shu. [Tan Qiao] (if he was really its author) developed a special kind of subjective realism, in which he emphasized that though the external world was real, our knowledge of it was so deeply affected by subjective factors that its full reality could not be said to have been seized (this, of course, is an attempt to express his point of view in modern terms). First he considers an infinite regress of images of an object in oppositely placed plane mirrors. The form and colour of the object ([xing] 形) is perfectly retained in each of the successive images (ying 影). Since it can exist without them, it is not alone and in itself complete ([shi] 實), but since they perfectly reproduce its form and colour, they are not in themselves empty ([xu] 虛); or, as might be said in modern terms, it is not fully real, but they are not fully unreal. Now that which is neither real nor not-real, concludes [Tan Qiao], is akin to the Tao.

Moeller notes Tan's room of parallel mirror images "is obviously indebted to an earlier Buddhist example." The Huayan patriarch Fazang used an illuminated statue of the Buddha inside a room of mirroring mirrors to illustrate Indra's net to Empress Wu Zetian. Needham additionally cites a zoological example of subjectivity from Xiaoji (梟雞; "Owls and Hens") (1.9) – written eight centuries before John Locke made the primary/secondary quality distinction. "For the owl, [Tan Qiao] says, the night is bright and the day dark; for the hen the converse is true, as for ourselves. Which of the two, he asks, in good Taoist style, is to be considered 'normal' and which 'abnormal'?"

Needham refers to Shehu (射虎; "Shooting Tigers") (1.11), which relates optical illusions with Daoist philosophy of perception. "A man may shoot at a striped stone, he says, under the impression that it is a tiger, or at a ripple on the water, under the impression that it is a crocodile. Moreover, even if these animals are really there, his attention may be so concentrated on them that he will simply not see the stones or the water beside them."

The Huashu article Sijing (四鏡; "Four Lenses") (1.10), with the earliest known reference to the basic types of simple lenses, metaphorically illustrates relativism and, in modern terms, subjective idealism.

I have always by me four lenses. The first is called [gui] 璧 (the 'sceptre', a diverging bi-concave lens). The second is called [zhu] 珠 (the 'pearl', biconvex). The third is called ['zhi] 砥 (the 'whetstone', plano-concave). The fourth is called [yu] 盂 (the 'bowl', plano-convex). With [gui] the object is larger (than the image). With [zhu] the object is smaller (than the image). With [zhi] the image appears upright. With [yu] the image appears inverted. When one looks at shapes or human forms through such instruments, one realizes that there is no such thing as (absolute) large or small, short or long, beautiful or ugly, desirable or hateful.

Needham notes that Giambattista della Porta's 1593 De refraction, optics parte was the first European treatment of these fundamental lens types.

Dahan (大含; "Great Containment") (1.24) discusses how sound originates from disturbances in qi (氣; "air; vapor; pneuma; energy; vital force"), a theory that Needham calls "far more advanced than the Pythagorean conception of sounds as a stuff composed of numbers."

The void ([xu] 虛) is transformed into (magical) power (shen 神). (Magical) power is transformed into [qi]. [Qi] is transformed into material things ([xing] 形). Material things and [qi] ride on one another ([xing qi xiang cheng] 形氣相乘), and thus sound is formed. It is not the ear which listens to sound but sound which of itself makes its way into the ear. It is not the valley which of itself gives out echoing sound, but sound of itself fills up the entire valley.
An ear is a small hollow ([qiao] 竅) and a valley is a large hollow. Mountains and marshes are a 'small valley' and Heaven and Earth are a 'large valley'. (Theoretically speaking, then) if one hollow gives out sound ten thousand hollows will all give out sound; if sound can be heard in one valley it should be heard in all the ten thousand valleys. Sound leads (back again) to [qi]; [qi] leads (back again) to (magical) power (shen 神); (magical) power leads (back again) to the void. (But) the void has in it (the potentiality for) power. The power has in it (the potentiality for) [qi]. [Qi] has in it (the potentiality for) sound. One leads (back again) to the other, which has (a potentiality for) the former within itself. (If this reversion and production were to be prolonged) even the tiny noises of mosquitoes and flies would be able to reach everywhere.

Several other Huashu articles mention this Daoist transformational series between xu (虚; "emptiness; void"), shen (神; "spirit; god"), qi (氣), and xing (形; "form; shape; material things"). They are said to be reversible back to emptiness (1.1), to exist everywhere (1.3), to all be one (1.16), to all contain each other (2.19), to transform from life to death and back to emptiness (1.20), and, adding a transformation from xing to jing (精; "essence") (cf. the Three Treasures), to underlie all human problems (1.15).

Other scholars quote the Huashu from Needham. Galeotti, Menconi, and Fronzoni suggest "surprising references to the butterfly effect" in "Great Containment" (1.24). Davies compares Francis Crick's The Astonishing Hypothesis with "Shooting Tigers" (1.11) that uses "optical illusions and human inattention to press the view that we pick out certain elements of reality to form our world-picture."

The Huashu has untold significance to the histories of philosophy and science. One final example mentions classical conditioning a millennium before Ivan Pavlov discovered it. Geng Xin (庚辛; "The Geng and Xin [Families]") (5.10) recounts how two neighbors, figuratively named after the 7th and 8th Celestial stems, used different materials to construct fish ponds.

The Geng's fish pond had a bamboo railing that made a ce-ce 策策 sound when leaned upon, and the Xin's had a wooden one that made a tang-tang 堂堂 sound. Both families fed their fish daily and the fish learned to leap out of the water when they heard these sounds. But even if they were not being fed, the fish leapt whenever they heard these respective sounds. Thus, the Geng's fish could be called with ce-ce and the Xin's fish with tang-tang, which is a Food Transformation. [庚氏穴池，构竹为凭槛，登之者其声“策策”焉。辛氏穴池，构木为凭槛，登之者其“堂堂”焉。二氏俱牧鱼于池中，每凭槛投饥，鱼必踊跃而出。他日但闻“策策”“堂堂”之声，不投饵亦踊跃而出，则是庚氏之鱼可名“策策”，辛氏之鱼可名“堂堂”，食之化也。]

The Huashu, unlike most other Daoist classics, is not available in English translation, with the unpublished exceptions of a MA thesis and a PhD dissertation.

== See also ==
- The Kinship of the Three
