= Li Ling (sinologist) =

Chinese scholar

- 李零
- Born: June 12, 1948 (age 78); Xingtai, Hebei, China
- Occupations: Historian, archaeologist, professor

Academic background
- Education: Institute of Archaeology, Chinese Academy of Social Sciences (CASS)
- Academic advisor: Zhang Zhengliang

Academic work
- Discipline: History, archaeology, epigraphy
- Sub-discipline: Chinese history, agricultural history, Chinese literature, paleography
- Institutions: Institute of Archaeology of the CASS, Research Center for Agricultural Economy of the CASS, Peking University
- Main interests: Bamboo and wooden slips, silk manuscripts, The Art of War, Fangshu, Zuo zhuan, Ancient Chinese history

Li Ling (Chinese: 李零; born 12 June 1948) is a Chinese historian and archaeologist.

== Biography ==
Li Ling was born in Xingtai, Hebei in 1948. His original family home was located in Wuxiang County, Shanxi, and Ling grew up in Beijing. He worked in Shanxi and Inner Mongolia for 7 years as a sent-down youth after graduation from high school.

He came back to Beijing in 1975, and was enrolled into the Institute of Archaeology (IA) of the Chinese Academy of Sciences (the institute later became part of the Chinese Academy of Social Sciences, CASS), working on the research of inscriptions on bronze under the supervision of Zhang Zhengliang. He graduated with a master's degree in History in 1982.

He joined the Bangxi Branch of Archaeological Team of IA CASS between 1982 and 1983. In the Research Center for Agricultural Economy, Chinese Academy of Social Sciences, he researched the history of pre-Qin agricultural institutions. Since 1985 he has been professor of Department of Chinese Language and Literature, Peking University.

== Works ==
Li Ling's research and teaching concentrate on bamboo and silk manuscripts, The Art of War, Fangshu, Zuo zhuan, and the history of ancient China.

His major academic works include:

1. Ling, Li; McMahon, Keith (1992). "The Contents and Terminology of the Mawangdui Texts on the Arts of the Bedchamber". Early China. 17: 145–185. doi:10.1017/S0362502800003709. ISSN 0362-5028. JSTOR 23351523. OCLC 1014513139.
2. Research on the ancient manuscript of The Art of War, Peking University Press 1995 (《孙子古本研究》,北京大学出版社 1995) ISBN 730102746X.
3. Research on Sun Tzu of Wu, China Book Press 1997. (《吴孙子发微》,中华书局 1997) ISBN 9787101095777.
4. Research on China Fangshu, Oriental Press 2000. (《中国方术考》,东方出版社 2000) ISBN 9787506015059.
5. Research on China Fangshu Vol. II, Oriental Press 2000. (《中国方术续考》，东方出版社 2000) ISBN 9787506012812.
6. Research on Guodian Chu Slips, Peking University Press 2002. (《郭店楚简校读记》，北京大学出版社 2002) ISBN 7301054629.
