= Cantong qi =

Earliest book on alchemy in China

- Traditional Chinese: 參同契
- Simplified Chinese: 参同契
- Hanyu Pinyin: Cāntóng qì
Transcriptions
Standard Mandarin
- Hanyu Pinyin: Cāntóng qì
- Wade–Giles: Ts'an^{1} T'ung^{2} Ch'i^{4}
Yue: Cantonese
- Jyutping: Caam1 tung4 kai3

Zhouyi cantong qi
- Traditional Chinese: 周易參同契
- Simplified Chinese: 周易参同契
- Hanyu Pinyin: Zhōuyì cāntóng qì
Transcriptions
Standard Mandarin
- Hanyu Pinyin: Zhōuyì cāntóng qì
- Wade–Giles: Chou^{1} Yi^{4} Ts'an^{1} T'ung^{2} Ch'i^{4}

The Cantong qi is deemed to be the earliest book on alchemy in China. The title has been variously translated as Kinship of the Three, Akinness of the Three, Triplex Unity, The Seal of the Unity of the Three, and in several other ways. The full title of the text is Zhouyi cantong qi, which can be translated as, for example, The Kinship of the Three, in Accordance with the Book of Changes.

According to the well-established view in China, the text was composed by Wei Boyang in the mid-second century CE, and deals entirely with alchemy, in particular with Neidan (or Internal Alchemy). In agreement with its title, the Cantong qi is concerned with three major subjects, Cosmology (the system of the Book of Changes), Taoism (the way of "non-doing"), and Alchemy.

== Authorship ==
For about a millennium, the authorship of the Cantong qi has been attributed to Wei Boyang, who was said to have been a southern alchemist from the Shangyu district of Kuaiji in the region of Jiangnan, corresponding to Fenghui (豐惠) in present-day Shangyu, about 80 km (50 mi) east of Hangzhou.

The best-known account of Wei Boyang is found in the Shenxian zhuan (Biographies of the Divine Immortals), a work attributed to Ge Hong (283–343). The work mentions Wei Boyang’s authorship of the Cantong qi and of another work entitled The Five Categories (五相類; Wǔxiànglèi), criticizing at the same time those who read the Cantong qi as a work concerned with cosmology instead of alchemy.

Several centuries later, Peng Xiao (?-955) gives a different portrait of Wei Boyang in his commentary, dating from 947 CE. With Peng Xiao, Wei Boyang becomes a learned master who is competent in prose and poetry, is versed in the esoteric texts, cultivates the Dao “in secret and silence,” and nourishes himself “in Empty Non-being.” At the end of his account, moreover, Peng Xiao gives further details on the early history of the text, saying:

Wei Boyang secretly disclosed his book to Xu Congshi (徐從事), a native of Qingzhou, who wrote a commentary on it keeping his name hidden. At the time of Emperor Huan of the Later Han (r. 146–167), the Master again transmitted it to Chunyu Shutong (淳于叔通). Since then, [the Cantong qi] has circulated in the world.

Elsewhere in his work, moreover, Peng Xiao reveals a different view on the authorship of the Cantong qi:

Some texts on the Dao say that the Cantong qi is in three parts (pian), and that Master Wei [Boyang], Xu Congshi, and Chunyu Shutong each wrote one part.

While Wei Boyang was a southern alchemist, Xu Congshi and Chunyu Shutong were representatives of the cosmological traditions of northern China. Xu was a native of Qingzhou, in the present-day region of Shandong. His disciple, Chunyu, was a "master of the methods" (fangshi) specialized in cosmology, prognostication, and the related sciences.

Sources prior to Peng Xiao show that Xu Congshi and Chunyu Shutong were originally believed to be the main authors of the Cantong qi. To give one example, an anonymous commentary to the Cantong qi, dating from ca. 700, is explicit about the roles played by Xu Congshi, Chunyu Shutong, and Wei Boyang in the creation of the text, saying:

Xu Congshi transmitted it to Master Chunyu Shutong ... who wrote another part entitled The Five Categories. ... Chunyu was the first to transmit the whole text to Master Wei Boyang.

Elsewhere, the same commentary ascribes the Cantong qi to Xu Congshi alone. For example, the notes on the verse, "He contemplates on high the manifest signs of Heaven" (「上觀顯天符」), state: "The True Man Xu Congshi looked above and contemplated the images of the trigrams; thus he determined Yin and Yang."

The passages quoted above reflect contrasting views on the authorship of the Cantong qi, between those who maintained that the text pertained in the first place to the northern cosmological traditions, and those who saw it as a product of the southern alchemical traditions. Taking this point into account, it has been suggested that the final paragraph in the Shenxian zhuan's account may have been added at a later time to further the second view.

With the possible exception of Ge Hong, the first author known to have attributed the composition of the whole Cantong qi to Wei Boyang is Liu Zhigu (劉知古), a Taoist priest and alchemical practitioner who was received at court by Emperor Xuanzong around 750 CE. Two centuries later, another alchemist, Peng Xiao, cites and praises Liu Zhigu’s discussion, and becomes the first major author to promote the same view. With the development of the Neidan traditions, this view became established. Since then, there has been virtually unanimous consent that the Cantong qi was not only transmitted, but also entirely composed, within the context of the alchemical tradition.

== Date ==
The three subjects mentioned in the Cantong qi raises inquiries into the dates of each of the respective portions.

=== Cosmology ===
The cosmological views of the Cantong qi are rooted in the system of the Book of Changes. Moreover, commentators (e.g. Peng Xiao and Zhu Xi) and scholars (e.g. Yang Xiaolei and Meng Naichang) have suggested that the Cantong qi is also related to the so-called "apocrypha" (緯書; weishu), a Han-dynasty corpus of cosmological and divinatory texts that is now almost entirely lost. While this relation has often been taken as evidence of a Han date of the Cantong qi, other scholars (e.g., Fukui Kōjun) have suggested that a work entitled Cantong qi may have existed during the Han period, but if it did exist, it was not the same as the present-day text.

One further point deserving attention in this context is the fact that two passages of the Cantong qi are similar to passages found in the Yijing commentary written by Yu Fan (164–233), a major representative of the cosmological tradition. Suzuki Yoshijirō suggested that Yu Fan drew on the Cantong qi for his commentary on the Yijing. Pregadio has suggested, vice versa, that the Cantong qi presents a poetical rendition of Yu Fan’s passages. If this suggestion is correct, the cosmological portions of the Cantong qi were composed, or at least were completed, after the end of the Han period. (Note: Yu Fan’s passage is preserved with other fragments of his lost Yijing commentary in Li Dingzuo’s 李鼎祚 Zhouyi jijie (周易集解).)

=== Alchemy ===
Among the large number of Chinese scholars who have expressed their views about the date of the Cantong qi, the opinions of Chen Guofu (who was for several decades the main Chinese expert in this field) are especially worthy of attention. As he pointed out, no extant alchemical work dating from the Han period is based on the doctrinal principles of the Cantong qi, or uses its cosmological model and its language. Pregadio's views are even more radical in this regard: "First, neither the Cantong qi nor its cosmological and alchemical models play any visible influence on extant Waidan texts dating not only from the Han period, but also from the whole Six Dynasties (i.e., until the sixth century inclusive). . . . Second, the same can be said with even more confidence about Neidan, since no text belonging to this branch of Chinese alchemy has existed—or has left traces of its existence—until the eighth century".

The earliest explicit mention of the Cantong qi in relation to alchemy was pointed out by Arthur Waley in the early 1930s. It is found in a piece by the poet Jiang Yan (444–505), who mentions the Cantong qi in a poem devoted to an immortal named Qin Gao. The relevant lines of the poem read, in Arthur Waley’s translation:

He proved the truth of the Cantong qi;
in a golden furnace he melted the Holy Drug.

=== Taoism ===
The "Taoist" portions of the Cantong qi make a distinction between the paths of "superior virtue" (shangde) and "inferior virtue" (xiade)—i.e., the paths of non-doing (wuwei) and of alchemy. This distinction is drawn from the perspective of the former path, and conforms to principles set forth in the Daode jing and elaborated on in the Zhuangzi. If this point is taken into account, it appears evident that those who gave the Cantong qi its present shape could only be the nameless representatives of the Taoist traditions of Jiangnan, who had essential ties to the doctrines of the Daode jing and the Zhuangzi.

Moreover, as it has been pointed out by Fabrizio Pregadio, the Taoist portions of the Cantong qi contain passages that criticize the Taoist methods of meditation on the inner deities. Despite this, the Cantong qi draws some of its terminology from texts pertaining to Taoist meditation, and in particular from the "Inner” version of the Scripture of the Yellow Court (Huangting jing), a work belonging to the Shangqing revelations of 364–70. Since the shared terms are evenly distributed among the different parts of the Cantong qi, it seems clear that an anonymous "hand"—the collective hand of the southern Taoist traditions—revised the text, probably after the end of the fourth century.

On the basis of the above evidence, Pregadio concludes that "the Cantong qi was composed in different stages, perhaps from the Han period onward, and did not reach a form substantially similar to the present one before ca. 450, and possibly one or even two centuries later."

== Composition ==
In most redactions, the Cantong qi is divided into 3 parts. Parts 1 and 2 contain the main text. With the exception of a few short passages in prose, they are written in 4- or 5-character verses (the 5-character verses prevail in the first part, while the second part is almost entirely made of 4-character verses). Several poems written in either meter mirror one another in subject matter and vocabulary.

Part 3 is made of several additional compositions: (1) An "Epilogue" (亂辭; Luanci), mostly written in saoti (騷體) prosody (named after the Lisao (Encountering Sorrow) piece in the Songs of Chu (Chuci)). (2) The "Song of the Tripod" (鼎器歌; Dingqi ge), a poem in three-character verses, another prosodic form not found in the first two parts. (3) A final section—entitled in different ways by different commentators—stating that the teachings of the Cantong qi are based on the Book of Changes, Taoism, and alchemy, and containing a final poem in which the author describes himself and his work.

In some redactions, moreover, the third part is concluded by an anonymous postface entitled "Eulogium" (讚序; Zanxu).

== The "Ancient Text" ==
In the early sixteenth century, a new version of the Cantong qi, anachronistically called Guwen cantong qi (古文參同契; "Ancient Text of the Cantong qi"), was created on the basis of a complete rearrangement of the scripture. This version divides the sections in verses of 4 characters from those in verses of 5 characters, following a suggestion that was first given by Yu Yan in his commentary of 1284. Yu Yan refers to this as a sudden realization that he had after he finished writing his work:

Suddenly one evening, while I was in complete quietude, I heard something like a whisper saying: "Wei Boyang wrote the Cantong qi, and Xu Congshi made a commentary. The sequence of the bamboo slips was disrupted; this is why the portions in four-character verses, those in five-character verses, and those in prose are in disorder."
[...] I wish I could subdivide the text into three parts, respectively made of four-character verses, five-character verses, and prose, so that text and commentary are not confused, in order to facilitate the inquiries of future students. However, my book is complete, and I cannot change it. (Note: Yu Yan's remarks on this subject are found at the very end of his commentary.)

The origins of the Ancient Text can be traced back to Du Yicheng (杜一誠), who came from Suzhou (like Yu Yan) and wrote a now-lost commentary on it in 1517. About three decades later, the famous literatus, Yang Shen (1488–1559), claimed to have found the work in a stone casket, and published it under his own name. Since then, the Ancient Text has been mainly associated with Yang Shen.

Several authors of commentaries to the standard version of the Cantong qi have regarded the Ancient Text as spurious, and similar criticism has also been voiced by Chinese scholars from the Qing period onward. This view has been partly influenced by the controversial personality of Yang Shen, who was known to have falsified early Chinese works. Whether the verdict of "non-authenticity" is or is not accurate, it should be considered that the Ancient Text, despite the different arrangement, includes the whole Cantong qi, without any addition and with the omission of only a few verses; and that no one without a solid knowledge of the standard version of the Cantong qi, and of its doctrinal principles, could have fabricated a work of this nature. In the arrangement of the Ancient Text, the 4- and 5-character verses are not reproduced in the same sequence as in the standard version; and in the new arrangement, the discourse of Cantong qi reveals a much clearer pattern.

The Ancient Text gives prominence not only to the three main subjects of the Cantong qi, but also to the three authors traditionally considered to be involved in its composition. This is likely to be the main reason why several commentators, for whom Wei Boyang could only be the single author of the whole Cantong qi, and Internal Alchemy its single subject, rejected the Ancient Text altogether. According to the new version, Wei Boyang wrote the portion entitled "Canon" ("Jing") in verses of 4 characters; Xu Congshi—whom the Ancient Text exegetes regularly identify as Xu Jingxiu (徐景休), as also did Yu Yan—contributed a "Commentary" (注; Zhu) in verses of 5 characters; and Chunyu Shutong added a final section, entitled "The Three Categories" (三相類; Sanxianglei). In the Ancient Text, both the "Canon" and the "Commentary" are divided into three chapters, respectively devoted to cosmology, Taoism, and alchemy.

== Cosmology ==
=== Cosmological Emblems ===
The main cosmological emblems in the 'Cantong qi are Qian, Kun, Kan, and Li, a subset of the eight trigrams, or Bagua. Although these names belong to the vocabulary of the Book of Changes, in the Cantong qi they denote formless principles that serve to explicate how the Dao generates the world and manifests itself in it. The corresponding trigrams (Qian ☰, Kun ☷, Kan ☵, Li ☲) and hexagrams (Qian ䷀, Kun ䷁, Kan ䷜, Li ䷝) are symbolic forms used to represent those principles.

Qian is the active ("creative") principle, essence, Yang, and Heaven; Kun is the passive ("receptive") principle, substance, Yin, and Earth. Being permanently joined to one another in the precosmic domain, Qian entrusts its creative power to Kun, and Kun brings creation to accomplishment. In the everlasting instant in which Qian and Kun give birth to the cosmos, the Yang of Qian moves into Kun, and, in response, the Yin of Kun moves into Qian. In the symbolic representation by the corresponding trigrams, Qian ☰ entrusts its essence to Kun and becomes Li ☲; Kun ☷ receives the essence of Qian and becomes Kan ☵.

Kan and Li, therefore, replace Qian and Kun in the cosmic domain. Since they harbor the Yang of Qian and the Yin of Kun, respectively, as their own inner essences, they enable the Yin and Yang of the precosmic domain to operate in the cosmic domain. The main images of Qian and Kun are Heaven and Earth, which are immutably joined to one another. The main images of Kan and Li are the Moon and the Sun, which alternate in their growth and decline during the longer or shorter time cycles.

=== Five agents ===
The five agents (五行; wǔxíng) are Wood, Fire, Soil, Metal, and Water. They are generated in the first place by the division of original Unity into Yin and Yang, and by the further subdivision of Yin and Yang into four states. In the Cantong qi, Water and Fire are the Yin and Yang of the post-celestial state, and Wood and Metal are True Yin and True Yang of the pre-celestial state. Soil, the fifth agent, has both a Yang and a Yin aspect. Being at the center, it stands for the source from which the other four agents derive.

=== Time Cycles ===
Three emblematic time cycles are given: the day, the month, and the year. These cycles manifest the presence of the "One Breath" (一氣; yiqi) of the Dao in the cosmos. All of them became models of the "fire times" (火候; huohou) in alchemy, which determine the process needed to heat the Elixir.

== Taoism ==
A passage of the Cantong qi states:

上德無為、
不以察求、
下德為之、
其用不休。

Translation:

Superior virtue has no doing:
it does not use examining and seeking.
Inferior virtue does:
its operation does not rest.

These verses are directly based on a passage of the Daode jing (sec. 38):

上德無為，
而無以為；
下德為之，
而有以為。

Translation:

Superior virtue has no doing:
there is nothing whereby it does.
Inferior virtue does:
there is something whereby it does.

In both the Daode jing and the Cantong qi, the subject of these verses is the distinction between non-doing (wuwei) and doing (youwei), referred to as the ways of "superior virtue" (上德; shàngdé) and "inferior virtue" (下德; xiàdé), respectively.

In the way of "superior virtue", the state prior to the separation of the One into the Two is spontaneously attained. The distinction between "one" and "two" does not even arise, and the unity of the precelestial and the postcelestial domains is immediately realized. There is no need to seek the One Breath, and therefore no support is necessary to find it. This is the way of the True Man (zhenren).

"Inferior virtue", instead, focuses on seeking; its unceasing search of the One Breath needs supports, and the postcelestial domain is "used" to find the precelestial state hidden within it. This is the way of alchemy. Performing a practice—either "internal" or "external"—is a form of "doing": the alchemical process is conducted in order to attain the realized state. Its purpose is to prepare one to enter the state of "non doing," and is fulfilled only when this happens. This process—which is gradual, and differs in this respect from immediate realization, the prerogative of "superior virtue"—is at the core of alchemy, in all of its forms.

=== Criticism of Other Practices ===
The Cantong qi devotes much attention to practices deemed to be inadequate for true realization. These practices are of two kinds. The first consists of non-alchemical practices, including breathing, meditation on the inner gods, sexual practices, and worship of spirits and minor deities:

是非歷臟法、
內觀有所思、
履行步斗宿、
六甲以日辰、
陰道厭九一、
濁亂弄元胞、
食氣鳴腸胃、
吐正吸外邪。

Translation:

This is not the method of passing through the viscera,
of inner contemplation and having a point of concentration;
of treading the Dipper and pacing the asterisms,
using the six jia as markers of time;
of sating yourself with the nine-and-one in the Way of Yin,
meddling and tampering with the original womb;
of ingesting breath till it chirps in your stomach,
exhaling the pure and inhaling the evil without.

This "treading the Dipper and pacing the asterisms" refers to yubu and bugang. All these practices and methods were current during the Later Han period and the Six Dynasties (1st–6th centuries CE). The second kind of criticism is addressed to alchemical practices that are not based on the principle of "being of the same kind" (or 同類; tonglei; "category"). Only lead and mercury, according to the Cantong qi, are of the "same kind" as Qian and Kun, and can represent and enable their conjunction.

== Alchemy ==
The alchemical discourse of the Cantong qi revolves around lead and mercury. Its basic principles proceed directly from its views on the relation between the Dao and the "ten thousand things" (i.e., multiplicity and change). As in the whole of Taoism, this relation is explained by means of a sequence of stages. The absolute principle (Dao) establishes itself as Unity (Yi 一), which divides itself into the active and the passive principles—namely, Qian and Kun, respectively equivalent to original Yang and Yin, or True Yang and True Yin. The re-conjunction of these principles gives birth to all entities and phenomena in the world. All these "stages" occur simultaneously.

The alchemical process consists in tracing the stages of this process in a reverse sequence, in order to recover the hidden One Breath and return to it. In alchemical language, True Lead (☰) and True Mercury (☷) respectively represent True Yang and True Yin. The Yin and Yang entities that respectively contain these authentic principles are represented by "black lead" (i.e., native lead ☵) and cinnabar (☲). In the strict sense of the term, alchemy consists in extracting True Lead from "black lead" and True Mercury from cinnabar, and in joining them to one another.

When the five agents (wuxing) are used to represent the alchemical process, the basic configuration is the same. "Black lead" and cinnabar are Water and Fire, and True Lead and True Mercury are Metal and Wood. In the alchemical process, where the "generation sequence" of the agents is inverted, Water ("black lead") generates Metal (True Lead), and Fire (cinnabar) generates Wood (True Mercury).

Soil, the fifth agent, allows the entire alchemical process to unfold, and also represent its completion. Positioned at the center of the other agents, it is emblematic of Unity containing True Yin and True Yang. Being found within both ingredients of the Elixir, Soil stands for their fundamental unity, and enables them to conjoin.

== Commentaries ==
With the exception of the Daode jing and the Zhuangzi, few Taoist texts have enjoyed an exegetical tradition as voluminous and diversified as the Cantong qi. More than three dozen traditional commentaries are extant, written between ca. 700 and the final years of the Qing dynasty. Different sources—in particular, bibliographies and premodern library catalogues—yield information on about twice as many lost commentaries and closely related works.

The Taoist Canon (Daozang) of 1445 contains the following commentaries to the standard text:

1. Zhouyi cantong qi zhu 周易參同契注 (Commentary to the Cantong qi). Anonymous, dating from ca. 700, containing the only surviving explication of the Cantong qi as a work concerned with Waidan. Only the portion corresponding to part 1 is extant.
2. Zhouyi cantong qi. Attributed to a venerable Taoist immortal, Yin Changsheng 陰長生, also dating from ca. 700.
3. Zhouyi cantong qi fenzhang tong zhenyi 周易參同契分章通真義 (True Meaning of the Cantong qi, with a Subdivision into Sections). Peng Xiao 彭曉 (?-955), dating from 947.
4. Zhouyi cantong qi kaoyi 周易參同契考異 (Investigation of Discrepancies in the Cantong qi). Zhu Xi 朱熹 (1130–1200), dating from 1197.
5. Zhouyi cantong qi. Chu Yong 儲泳 (also known as Chu Huagu 儲華谷, fl. ca. 1230), dating from ca. 1230.
6. Zhouyi cantong qi jie 周易參同契解 (Explication of the Cantong qi). Chen Xianwei 陳顯微 (?-after 1254), dating from 1234.
7. Zhouyi cantong qi fahui 周易參同契發揮 (Elucidation of the Cantong qi). Yu Yan 俞琰 (1258–1314), dating from 1284.
8. Zhouyi cantong qi zhu 周易參同契注 (Commentary to the Cantong qi). Anonymous Neidan commentary, dating from after 1208.

The first two commentaries present a somewhat unrefined state of the text, not divided into sections, with several sentences not yet normalized into 4- or 5-character verses, and—a significant detail—with more explicit allusions to Waidan compared to the later redactions (where certain sentences appear in slightly modified forms). In the mid-tenth century, Peng Xiao revised the text and produced the version that is, directly or indirectly, at the basis of most later commentaries. His work, which is divided into 90 sections, has not reached us in its original form; there is clear evidence that it was altered in the early thirteenth century with the incorporation of several dozen readings drawn from Zhu Xi’s text. The revised version of Peng Xiao’s text is faithfully followed by the anonymous Neidan commentary. The first text to be based on a comparison of earlier editions was established by Zhu Xi, but his work was deprived of most of its critical notes by the mid-fourteenth century. Zhu Xi’s text in turn served as a model to Chu Yong. The two remaining commentaries in the Taoist Canon are those by Chen Xianwei, whose text derives from Peng Xiao; and by Yu Yan, who based his work on Zhu Xi’s text. Yu Yan’s learned commentary contains quotations from about one hundred different texts, and is accompanied by philological notes on variants found in earlier editions.

The Neidan commentary by Chen Zhixu (陳致虛) (1290-ca. 1368) is entitled Zhouyi cantong qi zhujie (周易參同契注解; 'Commentary and Explication of the Cantong qi') and dates from ca. 1330. His text is ultimately based on Peng Xiao’s redaction, but contains about four dozen readings that are not documented in earlier extant works.

With the exception of Zhu Xi’s work, all extant commentaries to the Cantong qi written through the Yuan period (1279–1368) are related to the Taoist alchemical traditions. During the Ming (1368–1644) and the Qing (1644–1912) dynasties, the Cantong qi continued to exert its prestige on Neidan, but its influence also extended to other fields. Zhu Xi’s commentary, in particular, inspired many literati to read the text and write about it. The commentaries by Xu Wei 徐渭 (ca. 1570) and Wang Wenlu 王文祿 (1582) during the Ming period, and those by Li Guangdi 李光地 (ca. 1700), Wang Fu 汪紱 (ca. 1750), and Li Shixu 黎世序 (1823) during the Qing period, are representative of this trend.

The redaction by Chen Zhixu was, either on its own or in a substantial way, at the basis of the commentaries by Xu Wei, Wang Wenlu, Li Guangdi, and Wang Fu, as well as those by Zhang Wenlong 張文龍 (1566), Zhen Shu 甄淑 (1636), and Dong Dening 董德寧 (1787). Other commentators, including Lu Xixing 陸西星 (1569, revised in 1573) and Zhu Yuanyu 朱元育 (1669), based their texts on other redactions.

Ten commentaries to the Ancient Text version of the Cantong qi are extant, including those by Wang Jiachun 王家春 (1591?), Peng Haogu 彭好古 (1599), Qiu Zhao’ao 仇兆鰲 (1704), and Liu Yiming 劉一明 (1799), whose authors were affiliated with different Ming and Qing line-ages of Neidan.

== Translations ==
In 1932, Lu-Ch'iang Wu and Tenney L. Davis first translated the Cantong qi. A hard-to-find translation was published by the Chinese scholar, Zhou Shiyi, in 1988. In 1994, Richard Bertschinger translated the Guwen cantong qi, i.e., the 16th-century "Ancient Text" version. This was made by directly consulting the Chinese commentaries and contains lengthy excerpts from the same, in English translation; most notably those of Yu Yan 俞琰 (1258–1314) and Shang Yangzi (上阳子), also named Chen Zhixu 陈致虚(1290-?). A new annotated translation of the standard text was published by Fabrizio Pregadio in 2011. Several passages of the text are also translated and discussed in works by Joseph Needham, Ho Peng Yoke, and Nathan Sivin.

== See also ==
- Taoism
- Chinese alchemy
- Neidan
- Waidan
- Rishu
