= Divination by Astrological and Meteorological Phenomena =

Ancient Chinese astronomy manuscript

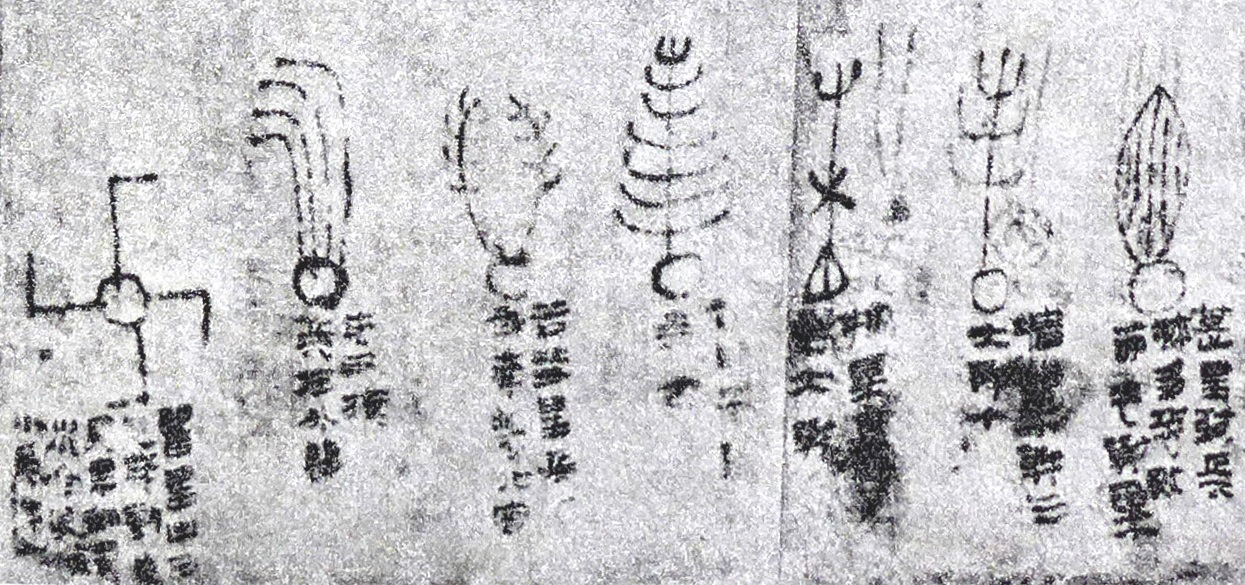
Detail of Han Silk "Comet diagram" from the Divination by Astrological and Meteorological Phenomena. In divination, those comets were thought to be the sign of epidemics of warfare and plague.

The Divination by Astrological and Meteorological Phenomena (Chinese: 天文氣象雜占; pinyin: Tiān Wén Qì Xiàng Zá Zhàn) is an ancient astronomy silk manuscript compiled by Chinese astronomers of the Western Han dynasty (202 BC – 9 AD) and found in the Mawangdui of Changsha, Hunan, China in 1973. It lists 29 comets (referred to as 彗星, huì xīng, literally broom stars) that appeared over a period of about 300 years.

It is now exhibited in the Hunan Provincial Museum.

== Contents ==
The Divination by Astrological and Meteorological Phenomena contains what archaeologists claim is the first definitive atlas of comets. There are roughly two dozen renderings of comets, some in fold out/pop-up format. In some cases, the pages of the document roll out to be five feet long. Each comet's picture has a caption which describes an event its appearance corresponded to, such as "the death of the prince", "the coming of the plague", or "the three-year drought."

One of the comets in the manuscript has four tails and resembles a swastika. In their 1985 book Comet, Carl Sagan and Ann Druyan argue that a rotating cometary nucleus with several equatorial eruptions in addition to its tail (appearing by about 2000 BCE) could explain why the swastika is found in the cultures of both the Old World and the pre-Columbian Americas.

Bob Kobres, in a 1992 paper, contends that the swastika-like comet on the Han-dynasty manuscript was labelled a "long tailed pheasant star" (dixing) because of its resemblance to a bird's foot or footprint.

== See also ==
- Chinese astrology
- Chinese astronomy
- Chu Silk Manuscript
- Mawangdui Silk Texts
