= Wei Boyang =

Chinese alchemist and writer

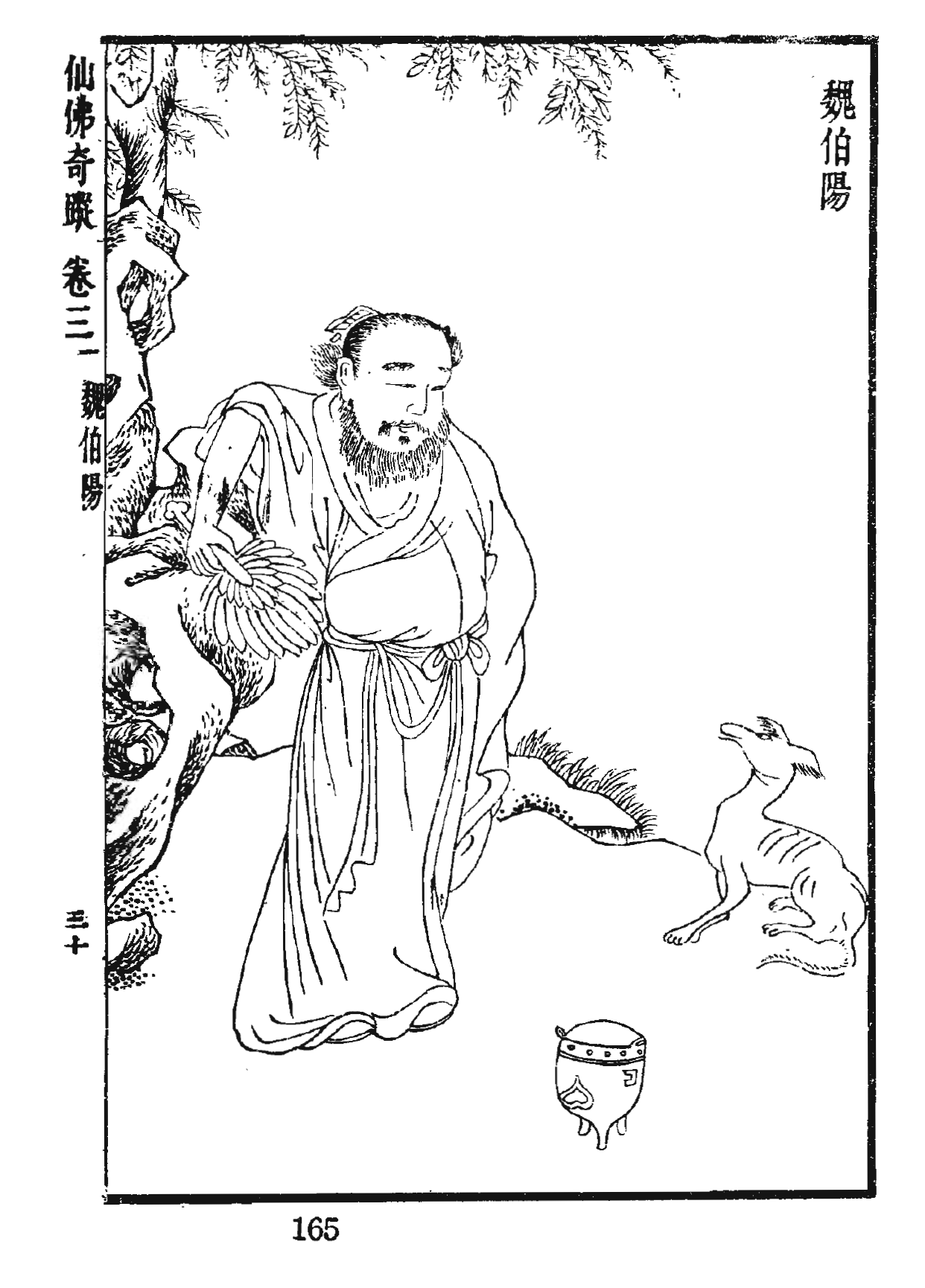
Wei Boyang as illustrated in the book《仙佛奇踪》in AD 1602

Wei Boyang (traditional Chinese: 魏伯陽; simplified Chinese: 魏伯阳; pinyin: Wèi bóyáng) was a Chinese writer and Taoist alchemist of the Eastern Han dynasty. He is the author of The Kinship of the Three (also known as Cantong Qi), and is noted as the first person to have documented something like the chemical composition of gunpowder in 142 AD. As someone or him, only mixed the chemical compound of Sulphur and Saltpetre.

Wei Boyang is considered a semi-legendary figure who represented a "collective unity." His Cantong Qi was probably written in stages from the Han dynasty onward until it approached its current form, before 450 AD.

== Biography ==
Wei Boyang was born in a prominent family. One theory claims that he was the son of a minister named Wei Lang (魏朗). In the second year of Jianning (169 AD), Wei Lang was killed due to political trouble. Wei Boyang was forced to hide in the mountains, there he focused on studying Taoism and refining elixirs.

Wei Boyang died in the second year of Huangchu of Cao Pi (221 AD).

== Legend ==
According to a hagiographical account in the Shenxian zhuan (神仙传; 'Biographies of the Divine Immortals'), a work attributed to Ge Hong (283–343), he and three disciples retired to a mountain and compounded an elixir for immortality:

[...] The hearts of his disciples were not settled. [They attempt to test the elixir on a dog to see its effects.] Wei Boyang then leaves and returns with a white dog. The white dog is then fed the pill and promptly dies. Despite this, Wei Boyang claims: "Fear has no place in practicing alchemy. The dog died because it did not have a clear mind, if one takes the pill while afraid like the dog, wouldn't that produce the same result?"

The disciples then ask whether their master would take it or not, after which Wei Boyang says: "We went against society's customs and left our homes to practice in the mountains, without obtaining the way to immortality, we vow to never return. [...]" He swallows the pill and promptly dies.

The disciples discuss why practice alchemy for longevity when one dies after taking the elixir, whereas one would live for decades more without it. One of them then refuses to take the pill. The second disciple rebukes that Wei Boyang is no ordinary man, taking the elixir and dying must have been intentional. The second disciple then takes the pill and dies.

The remaining disciple leaves the mountain to purchase coffin wood. Afterwards, Wei Boyang sprangs ups and comes to life again. He gave the elixir into the mouths of the dead disciple and the dog, and they also revived. [...] Thus Wei Boyang and his faithful disciple attained immortality. Upon realizing this, the other disciple is full of regret.

== Teachings ==
Regarding Wei Boyang's writings, Ge Hong wrote in the Shenxian zhuan: "Boyang produced Cantong Qi (参同契) and Wuxianglei (五相类), of two volumes."

Wei Boyang believed that cultivating elixirs and the creation of heaven and earth were based on the same principles.

Historical sites of Wei Boyang's work in chinese alchemy are located in the Fengming Mountains (凤鸣山) located 4 kilometers southeast of Fenghui (丰惠), and 17 kilometers away from Shangyu City.

== See also ==
- Chinese alchemy
- History of gunpowder
- Taoism

== Bibliography ==
- Pregadio, Fabrizio (2011), The Seal of the Unity of the Three
