= Rishu =

Genre of divinatory texts in that circulated widely in China

Rishu (Chinese: 日書; pinyin: Rìshū; lit. 'Day Book') is a genre of hemerological texts that circulated widely in China from the late Warring States Period to the Western Han dynasty. This term finds its first evident presence dated back to 217 BCE in China.

== Historical significance ==
=== China ===
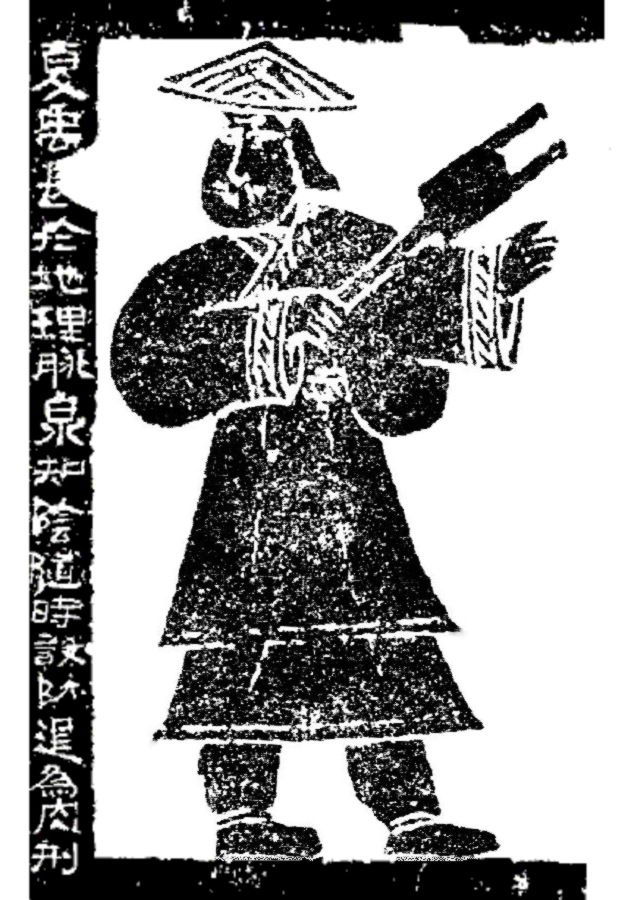
Han dynasty depiction of Yu

In Mainland China, the Rishu (日書) "Day Book" is one of the pieces of literature discovered in late Warring States period tomb libraries which has confirmed the Baopuzi description of Yubu as a series of three steps. It has great cultural significance in ancient and medieval China. It is an almanac or hemerology which is one of the Shuihudi Qin bamboo texts recovered in 1975 in Shuihudi, Hubei, from a tomb dated 217 BCE. Donald Harper believes that for describing texts like the Rishu 日書, which determine lucky and unlucky days on sexagenary cycle numerology without reference to astrology, "hemerology" is a more accurate translation than "almanac" (typically meaning an annual publication for a single calendar year).

==== The Steps of Yu ====
The Rishu has one occurrence of Yubu san (禹步三, "'Steps of Yu, three times"), and one of Yubu sanmian (禹步三勉, "Steps of Yu, three exertions"). This is consistent with the Baopuzi descriptions of Yubu in terms of sanbu "three steps" and jiuji (九跡, "nine footprints/traces,") where each "step" was composed of three separate steps. Andersen notes that the term Sanbu jiuji was later used synonymously with Yubu.

Yu is closely associated with travel in the Rishu. The section titled Yu xuyu 禹須臾 "Promptuary/Instant of Yu" begins by listing the stem and branch sexagenary cycle in five groups of twelve signs each, and gives, for the days in each group, a certain lucky time of day to safely begin a journey. This section concludes with a ritual to be performed before going out of the city gate.

When traveling, on reaching the threshold-bar of the capital gate, perform the Pace of Yu thrice. Advance one pace. Call out, "Kǝgw [gao 皋 "name of the spirit being addressed"], I dare make a declaration. Let so-and-so [to be filled in with the name of the traveler] travel and not suffer odium; he first acts as Yu to clear the road." Immediately draw five lines on the ground. Pick up the soil from the center of the lines and put it in your bosom.

Isabelle Robinet says this text lets us reconstruct the connection between "exorcistic practices intended to ward off harmful demons, and therapeutic practices intended to ensure good hygiene and good physical balance", in other words, "the evolution of exorcism toward medicine, a shift from conceiving sickness as caused by demons to seeing sickness as the result of an imbalance".

== Contemporary world significance ==
- The Japanese calendar designates some days of the year with special names to mark the change in the season. The 24 sekki (Hanyu Pinyin: Èrshísì Jiéqì; Japanese: 二十四節気; rōmaji: nijūshi sekki) are days that divide the solar year into twenty four equal sections. Zassetsu (雑節) is a collective term for the seasonal days other than the 24 sekki. 72 Kō (七十二候, Shichijūni kō) days are made from dividing the 24 sekki of a year further by three. Out of these special names, Shunbun, Risshū, and Tōji are quite frequently used in everyday life in Japan. Of the 24 sekki, Risshū (立秋) is the 13th solar term which signifies the beginning of autumn season.

== See also ==
- Bugang, a Daoist ritual dance based upon the limping Yubu
- Cantong qi
- Paidushko horo, a Balkan "limping dance"
- Yu the Great, Xia dynasty king and founder
