= Bugang =

Daoist ritual dance or walk

Chinese name
- Chinese: 步罡
- Literal meaning: step/pace Big Dipper
Transcriptions
Standard Mandarin
- Hanyu Pinyin: bùgāng
- Wade–Giles: pu-kang
Yue: Cantonese
- Yale Romanization: jyu^{5}bou^{6}

Korean name
- Hangul: 보강
Transcriptions
- Revised Romanization: bogang
- McCune–Reischauer: pogang

Japanese name
- Kanji: 步罡
- Hiragana: ほこう
Transcriptions
- Revised Hepburn: hokō

Bugang is a Daoist ritual dance or walk, based upon the Yubu "Steps of Yu" tradition, in which a Taoist priest paces through a supernatural pattern, such as stars in the Big Dipper or numbers in the Loshu magic square. Texts from the (4th century) Shangqing School revelations contain the earliest descriptions of bugang, frequently with the practitioner pacing among constellations, especially the Big Dipper's stars. When religious Daoism began during the Six Dynasties period (220–589 CE), the expression Chinese: 步罡踏斗; pinyin: bugang tadou; trans. "pacing the guideline and treading on (the stars of) the Dipper" became popular.

== Terminology ==
Bugang "pacing the stars of the Big Dipper" combines two Chinese words, bu (步; "step; tread; pace (off)") and gang (罡; "Big Dipper; (esp.) stars in the handle of the Big Dipper"), and was first recorded in the (c. 3rd century) Records of the Three Kingdoms.

The variant bugang (步綱; "pacing the guideline"), which uses a different gang word 綱 ("headrope of a fishing net; key link; guiding principle; guideline"), was first recorded in the (c. 1029) Yunji Qiqian anthology of the Daoist Canon.

Several later Daoist scriptures on bugang write it 布剛 with variant Chinese characters, writing bu (步; "walk") as 布 ("distribute; spread; declare"), and gang (罡; "Dipper") or gang (綱; "guideline") as gang (剛; "strength; firmness"). Andersen says that frequently the notions of "walking the guideline, spreading out the guideline, and distributing strength are subtly blended."

The phrase bugang tadou (步罡踏斗; "pacing the guideline and treading on (the stars of) the Dipper") adds the words ta (踏; "step on; tread; trample") and dou (斗; "dipper; Big Dipper").

Beidou (北斗) (lit. "Northern Dipper) is the common Chinese name for the Big Dipper. Tiangang (天罡) and Tiangangxing (天罡星) (with 天; tian; "sky; h/Heaven" and 星; xing; "star; heavenly body") both mean "Big Dipper; (esp.) handle of the Big Dipper" – and are the second of the 108 Stars of Destiny in the Water Margin.

The Tang dynasty poet Lu Guimeng (d. 881) coined the expression bugangtan (步罡壇; "pacing the guideline (around the) altar").

== Practices ==
Bugang is practiced in two basic forms: the Shangqing School walk along the seven stars of the Big Dipper and the Zhengyi School walk through the eight trigrams arranged in the Luoshu (洛書) magic square. In both variants of the practice, each step is accompanied by three actions coordinated with the movements of the feet: the inwardly pronounced line of incantation when the priest reaches the star or trigram in question, the visualization of a journey through heaven, and shoujue (手訣; "hand practices") in which the thumb of the left hand represents movement in parallel to the body of the priest.

Indeed, the basic patterns followed in the practice of bugang are associated with the concept of the movement through heaven of the high god Taiyi, the Great One, or the Supreme Unity, and the accompanying incantations often make it clear that as the priest performs the walk, he impersonates Taiyi. A powerful theme underlying the practice is that of world-creation and the establishment of order, frequently associated with the construction of the sacred area in the initial part of a ritual. Within the liturgy, however, the characteristic specific functions of bugang are, first, to serve as elements of the purification of the ritual area, and second, to structure the movement of the high priest (gaogong 高功), as he approaches the point of the transmission of a document to heaven, and the point of his ascent in order to deliver the document to the Most High.

The Daoist Lingbao School also performed the Yubu ritual.

== Shangqing ==
Ursa Minor constellation map

Shangqing "Supreme/Highest Clarity" School texts, supposedly revealed to Yang Xi from 364 to 370 CE, contain the earliest extant references to bugang along the stars of the Dipper. Early Shangqing texts emphasize that the purpose of bugang is to achieve individual immortality through the ascent to heaven.

In the Shangqing texts, where this practice has not yet reached the great complexity that it would acquire later, the adept draws the stars of Ursa Major on a silk ribbon, and, after constructing a sacred enclosure by commanding the planets to take their places around him, he "clothes himself" in the stars of the Dipper and then rises into the constellation. First, he walks around the outer circle of "dark stars", invoking the goddesses who live in them. Only then can he proceed to the male gods of the Dipper, making the resident god appear as he steps on each star in turn, following a strict order.

For instance, the Bu tiangang jing (步天綱經; "Scripture on Walking the Celestial Mainstay") (DZ 1316), which explains itself as the full revelation mentioned in an earlier "excerpted and abbreviated" text, describes the origins and practice of bugang. It states than in 24 BCE, Wang Feng 王鳳, uncle of Wang Mang who overthrew the Han and founded the brief Xin dynasty, obtained a summary of bugang methods from "practitioner of the Dao" Liu Jing 劉京, who in turn had studied them with "teacher in transcendence" Lord Zhang of Handan 邯鄲張君. Although this Bu tiangang jing time scheme may prove to correspond to the actual history of bugang, Andersen says this story "also gives ample cause for suspicion.". The emphasis on the usurpant emperor Wang Mang may well be a reflection of the Hanshu (99) story – which does not refer to any walking – that Wang Mang used the Dipper as a cosmic weapon to protect himself against his enemies. "We find ample information in Han dynasty texts on the use of the Dipper as an exorcistic weapon, but I have found no trace of bugang in any of these accounts."

The Bu tiangang jing describes bugang as an ecstatic flight through the stars.

[T]he adept is required first to pace back and forth through the stars three times and then to perform a final walk from the first to the ninth star, in all cases skipping the third star, Zhenren, the Perfected, which is to be avoided, and which is instead saluted by the adept, when he is standing in the ninth star. Generally, each step is accompanied by an incantation which is pronounced by the adept standing in the star and which evokes the image of the deity of the star in question.

The deity Taiyi 太一, translated as the Great One, Great Oneness, Great Monad, and Great Unity, has been viewed as the supreme god of heaven since the late Warring States period. According to Chinese mythology and astronomical tradition, Taiyi, the Emperor of Heaven, resides in the brightest star in the bowl of the "Little Dipper", the large, reddish Kochab or Beta Ursae Minoris (β UMi) near the northern Pole star.

Traditional Chinese astronomy calls β UMi the beijier (北極二; "North Pole second [star]"), and locates Ursa Minor within the Ziweiyuan (紫微垣; "Purple Forbidden enclosure"). Beta Ursae Minoris is described variously as the ladle by which Taiyi pours out the primordial breath and as the chariot in which he moves through the heavens. "The underlying cosmographic concept is that of the Dipper as a pointer — and a conductor — stretching out from the pole of heaven to the belt of the celestial equator and, by its annual movement, like the outer leg of a compass, describing a circle which is the circumference of heaven". In Chinese terms, gang (綱; "guiding rope of a net") is the Dipper and ji (紀; "leading thread") is the circle, and their original meanings were semantically extended in gangji (綱紀; "social order and law"), the norms of conduct directed by the emperor. Gang and Ji connect in the constellation Jiao (角; "Horn"), which is one of the 28 xiu (宿; "lunar mansions") at which the Dipper points during the year. The Hanshu calendrical treatise calls the Dipper tian zhi gang (天之綱; "Heaven's gang"), and associates ji (紀) (or 記; ji; "record") with the 12-year cycle of Jupiter around the sun, which is related to various calendrical sequences and cycles of time.

Daoist technical vocabulary for bugang contrasts Tiangang (天綱; "Guideline of Heaven") with Diji (地紀; "Sequence of Earth"), referring to the seasonal changes on Earth, activated by the movements in heaven, and conceived as a spatial flow on the circumference of the Earth. "Thus it represents the terrestrial pattern to which the powers emanating from the pole of heaven are transferred by the Dipper performing its annual revolution in the sky".

The Feixing jiuchen yujing (九晨玉經; "Nine Monarchs' Jade Scripture on Flying") and other Shangqing revealed texts describe bugang as either walking across the stars of the Dipper as it appears in the sky or walking around the five planets. It is categorized under the term feibu zhi dao (飛步之道; "the way of the flying walk"). The Bu tiangang jing describes the long-term results of these practices.

If you constantly tread on emptiness (i.e., the stars), then after one year you will avoid blame, after two years you will avoid weapons, after three years you will avoid death, and after four years you will become a terrestrial immortal. None of the myriad harmful and evil influences will dare act upon you. From then on your blessings will be countless. You cause the gods to arrive, you command the spiritual forces. You ride a chariot yoked with flying dragons. The heaven of the Supreme Pole (Taiji 太極) presents you with the fungus of immortality. The Jade Emperor (Yudi 玉帝) gives you immortal lads [to escort you]. If you practice it for two times seven years, you will become a Perfected of the heaven of Superior Purity (DZ 1316).

This Shangqing form of bugang was almost exclusively used for purposes of individual salvation, rather than used within the framework of a larger ritual context, as seen in the Zhengyi tradition.

== Zhengyi ==
The Zhengyi Dao "Way of Orthodox Unity" began during the Tang dynasty as a transformation of the earlier Tianshi Dao "Way of the Celestial Masters", and became prominent during the Song dynasty under Emperor Huizong and the 30th Celestial Master Zhang Jixian 張繼先 (1092–1126). The Zhengyi tradition changed the Shangqing practice of bugang from an individual walk through the stars into a liturgical walk through the jiugong (九宫; "Nine Palaces") with the 8 trigrams arranged around the Luoshu. Zhengyi forms of bugang were incorporated into the general liturgy for purposes of exorcism and purification, an essential part of the zhu jinfa (诸禁法; "many methods of restriction"), particularly during the initial and final parts of ceremonies.

The Shangqing huangshu guodu yi (上清黄書過度儀; "Liturgy of Passage of the Yellow Writ of Highest Clarity") (DZ 1294) is the earliest preserved Zhengyi text to record bugang-type dancing following the magic-square pattern. Mark Csikszentmihalyi says, "This text may date from the second to fifth centuries CE, and reflects the integration of ritualized visualization, invocation, and sexual techniques." According to Andersen "It presents a wedding ritual, or perhaps one should rather say a rite of sexual union. In any case, sexual union takes place as a part of the ritual, which also includes certain dances performed by the couple." This text uses the word nie (躡; "walk on tiptoe; walk quietly; tread") in nieji (躡紀; "treading the sequence") or nieshi (躡時; "treading the [pattern of] time") – instead of bugang, which later became the standard term – describing a ritual dance in which the couple each puts one foot in opposing earthly branches and joins their other two feet in the center, then shifting to the next earthly branch, and so on until they have gone through the whole circle.

Nieji refers specifically to the practice, performed repeatedly during the ritual and in turns by both participants, of "toeing" with one foot the body of the other while lying side by side. The movement starts from the heart and describes a circle in eleven steps, the man moving his left foot clockwise to an end point on the right side of the woman and the woman moving her right foot counter-clockwise to an end point on the left side of the man. In both cases it is clear from the accompanying incantation that the notion of the movement of the four seasons is involved. The practice, which is described also as a form of massage, clearly intends to establish an inner circulation in accordance with the patterns of the universe.

This text gives a series of sexually implicit incantations for neidan "inner circulations" uniting the couple's yin and yang, in order to reach the Shengmen (生門; "Gate of Life"). The man says, "I wish to mount the Guideline of Heaven and enter the Sequence of Earth. The four seasons and the five elements are each of themselves apposite." The woman says, "I wish to lie on earth and receive heaven, uniting yin and yang. The four seasons and the five elements are each of themselves apposite." They both say, "The five breaths — both the dark and the yellow — adhere of their own [to my body]. They return to my five organs, which glow with light."

The basis of ritual dances in the Huangshu is referred to as Taiyi bu jiugong (一步九宫), "The walk of Taiyi through the Nine Palaces" (8 trigrams plus center in the Luoshu magic square), which represents Taiyi travelling though the Nine Heavens. The couple creates a ritual area by bu "distributing" the Nine Palaces, by joining fingers or toes so as to give a total number corresponding to each position, and calling out the name and number of the palace in question. The trigrams and gates of the Nine Palaces are further associated with the "nine" stars of the Big Dipper, which has seven visible stars. The number of nine is reached by the addition of two "assistant" stars: 輔星; Fuxing (Alcor, 80 Ursae Majoris) and 弼星; Bixing, an invisible star near the handle of the Dipper. These nine stars have a special Daoist nomenclature of: Tianpeng (天蓬), Tiannei (天内), Tianchong (天衝), Tianfu (天輔), Tianqin (天禽), Tianxin (天心), Tianzhu (天柱), Tianren (天任), and Tianying (天英).

The Shangqing huangshu guodu yi pattern of "walking" on the body is paralleled by the Zhengyi liturgy of present-day south Taiwan, wherein the priest performs bugang simultaneously as a walk with his feet on the ground and a walk with his thumb on his left hand. For example, the Zeng family's secret manual says, "With the foot one treads the Dipper, while in the hand one points to the fingers. There must be absolutely no disorderly movement. When the foot reaches the Gate of Heaven, the hand reaches the Gate of Heaven. When the foot reaches the Door of Earth, the hand reaches the Door of Earth. The secret instructions of Taoism embrace heaven and earth".

The Song dynasty Zhengyi master Lu Shizhong 路時中, who founded the Yutang dafa (玉堂大法) tradition in the 1120s, explained the efficacy of bugang:

Between heaven and earth man is the most numinous of all things. Therefore, whenever he points in his hand or walks with his feet, he is united with Perfection (zhen 真). The method of bugang arises from this. To perform bugang is to fly along the essences of heaven, to tread the numinae of earth, and to set the perfection of man in motion. Through it the Three Powers (Sancai 三才, i.e., the three cosmic planes) unite their virtues, the nine breaths are aligned, and demons and spirits spin. (Wushang xuanyuan santian yutang dafa, DZ 220).

Daoists have conceived Taiyi's movements as occurring either along the stars of the Dipper or through the palaces of the eight trigrams, in both cases leading eventually to a return to the point of departure. One solution to the problem of how Taiyi returns through the Dipper involves the Santai (三台; "Three Terraces"), three pairs of stars in Ursa Major below the Dipper, from Iota Ursae Majoris to 61 Ursae Majoris. The Santai are described as "the staircase of heaven" and "the road along which Taiyi descends and ascends". In many variants of bugang, "the priest begins by walking along the stars of the Dipper — starting out from the star closest to the pole — and ends by returning to the Gate of Heaven along the Three Terraces".

The two major forms of bugang are modelled on the two patterns of Taiyi moving through the stars or the trigrams, expressed by the priest's incantations that he is impersonating Taiyi. Bugang is categorized into two ritual functions, either serving purposes of exorcism (focusing on Taiyi's outward movement and distribution of strength) or purposes of ascent (focusing on his return to the center). Bugang (布剛; "distribution of strength") occurs in the Chunqiu yundou shu (春秋運斗樞) describing the Sanhuang (三皇; "Three Sovereigns"), "They contained all vastness and walked in the centre; they opened up yin and yang and distributed strength".

The Jiuling gang (九靈罡; "Guideline of the Nine Spirits") bugang practice has been one of the most widespread in Daoist texts since the Song dynasty, and is still practiced by Zhengyi priests under the name Tianhuang dou (天皇斗; "Dipper of the Celestial Sovereign [i.e., Taiyi]"). The Jiuling gang is based on the Daoist celestial stem-based "magic invisibility" system of Qimen Dunjia "Irregular Gate, Hidden Stem", which the (4th century) Baopuzi "Into Mountains: Over Streams" chapter first mentioned in context with Yubu. The Dunjia (遁甲; "Hidden Stem") calculates the position within the space-time structure of the liuding (六丁; "six ding") "spirits that define the place of the Qimen (奇門; "Irregular Gate"), going through which one may obtain invisibility and thus protection from all dangers. Irregular Gate divination is associated with Eight Gates, namely the Gate of Rest, of Life, of Injury, of Closing, of Brilliance, of Death, of Fright, and Gate of Opening. The incantation begins:

The essential wonder of the Dipper, the twelve chronograms (chen 辰). I mount the numinous light, and the majestic martial forces are deployed. The breaths appear like floating clouds. Their seven movements correspond to heaven above. I know that the transformations have auspicious and inauspicious times. I enter the constellation of the Dipper and cross the Threshold of Heaven (Tianguan 天關, i.e., the seventh star of the Dipper). I obey the law of the six combinations and abide by jia and yi [甲乙] (DZ 220).

This is followed by the walk through the stars, accompanied by sentences enumerating of the names of the stars, with the walk starting in Tianying and ending through an exit in Tianpeng. The incantation concludes:

The way of the Dipper is accomplished, the hard and soft (i.e., yang and yin) reach their full capacity. The ten thousand evil influences are exterminated, the hundred devils destroyed. Happiness and blessing are increased and passed on to following generations. I enter the region of obscurity and live forever. (DZ 566).

Yijing Hexagram 63, Jiji (既濟; "Already Fording").

The Zhengyi (1201) Daomen tongjiao ji (道門通教集; "Collected Works for All Daoists Penetrating the Teaching") text records bugang purification of the altar at the end of the rite, following the "three steps and nine traces" from the Baopuzi. It is compared with walking the Yijing Hexagram 63, Jiji (既濟; "Already Fording"), which is composed of the trigrams li (離) (☲) Fire and kan (坎) (☵) Water. This hexagram comparison "is based on the equivalence of an isolated step with an unbroken line and two juxtaposed steps with a broken line", with a bottom-center first step and top-left ninth step.

Du Guangting's (891) Taishang huanglu zhaiyi (太上黃籙齋儀; "Protocols for Yellow Register Rites of the Most High") (DZ 507) describes using bugang during presentation of the memorial in the general liturgy. This practice originated with the Song dynasty Zhengyi tradition of the Tianxin zhengfa (天心正法; "Orthodox Method of the Celestial Heart"), founded by Tan Zixiao.

The (1116) Taishang zhuguo jiumin zongzhen biyao (太上助国救民总真秘要; "Secret Essentials of the Perfected Totality, of the Most High, for Assisting the Country and Saving the People") (DZ 1227), compiled by Yuan Miaozong 元妙宗, has a section on bugang that contains Tang dynasty altar purification techniques, which are still used by Zhengyi Daoist priests. The Huitan gang (回壇罡; "Guideline for Returning to the Altar"), for example, gives a diagram with an incantation for each star.

The Gate of Heaven is opened above. The wheel of the method of flying to heaven moves with the speed of thunder and lightning and advances like wind and clouds. The yellow memorial reaches upwards and penetrates to the Court of Heaven. My body returns to the Gate of Heaven, where it merges with spontaneity and unites in Perfection with the Way. The body (of the high priest) enters the Gate of Heaven below the Golden Portal. He offers three sticks of incense and after this submits the memorial.

== See also ==
- Yubu

== Present day ==
In contemporary Daoism, the bugang "Pacing the Dipper" rite continues to be practiced. Poul Andersen says,

The forms of bugang used in present-day liturgy mostly derive from the ritual compilations of the Song dynasty. They are typically performed by the high priest alone and are described in his "secret manual" (mijue [秘訣]). The practice is highly valued by the present-day priesthood, and it is commonly conceived as a foundational element of Taoist ritual. A similar view is expressed in many historical texts, such as in the Taishang zhuguo jiumin zongzhen biyao ([太上助國救民總真必要] Secret Essentials of the Totality of Perfected, of the Most High, for Assisting the Country and Saving the People...), by Yuan Miaozong, who says: "The Paces of Yu along the guideline of the Dipper, and the instructions for practices in the palm of the hand, are the great essentials of the Way, the primordial leading thread of (all other) methods.".
