= Wushi'er Bingfang =

Ancient Chinese medical text

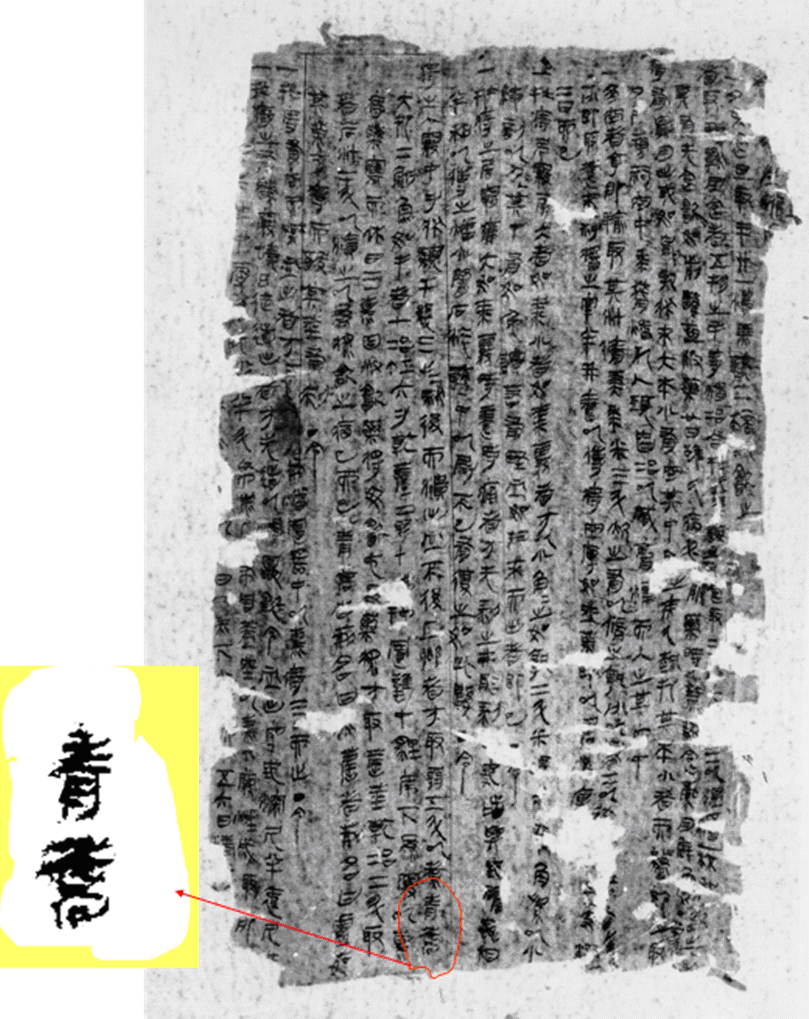
The Recipes for Fifty-two Ailments contains the first known mention of qinghao 青蒿, or wormwood, in history. Though it appears here in a recipe against female hemorrhoids, in later Chinese medical texts wormwood was recommended for treating intermittent fevers. In the 1970s, artemisinin was isolated from Artemisia annua (a kind of wormwood) and shown to have antimalarial properties.

The Wushi'er Bingfang (Chinese: 五十二病方; pinyin: Wǔshí’èr Bìngfāng), or Recipes for Fifty-Two Ailments, is an ancient Chinese medical text that was discovered in 1973 in Mawangdui in a tomb that was sealed in 168 BCE under the Han dynasty. The text was copied in seal script on sheets of silk around 215 BCE, under the Qin dynasty, but might have dated from even earlier. Modern editors chose its title because the text starts with a list of fifty-two ailments for which recipes are given. The formulary presents more than 250 exorcistic and drug-based cures for ailments such as warts, hemorrhoids, inguinal swellings, and snake bites. Among other medical treatments, the text also recommends lancing and cauterization, but mention neither acupuncture nor moxibustion (cauterization with moxa).

With roughly 9,950 characters, Wushi'er bingfang is the longest of the medical texts that have been found in ancient Chinese tombs. Along with other excavated manuscripts (from Zhangjiashan and Wuwei, among others), it has shed light on the early development of Chinese medicine. It illustrates, for instance, that magical incantations were a common therapeutic method among the social elite of the time. And because it shows the development of channel theory in a primitive stage and does not mention the doctrine of Yinyang and the Five Phases, it has pushed historians to date the more sophisticated Huangdi Neijing (Yellow Emperor's Inner Canon) to the first century BCE.

The original manuscript of Wushi'er bingfang is kept at the Hunan Provincial Museum in Changsha.

== See also ==
- Rishu

== Bibliography ==
- Harper, Donald J. (1998), Early Chinese Medical Literature: The Mawangdui Medical Manuscripts, London and New York: Kegan Paul International, ISBN 0-7103-0582-6.
- Harper, Donald (1999), "Warring States Natural Philosophy and Occult Thought", in Michael Loewe and Edward Shaughnessy (ed.), The Cambridge History of Ancient China: From the Origins of Civilization to 221 B.C., Cambridge: Cambridge University Press, pp. 813–884, ISBN 0-521-47030-7.
- Hsu, Elisabeth (2006), "Reflections on the 'discovery' of the antimalarial qinghao", British Journal of Clinical Pharmacology, 61 (6): 666–670, doi:10.1111/j.1365-2125.2006.02673.x, PMC 1885105, PMID 16722826.
- Lo, Vivienne (2002), "Introduction", in Lu Gwei-djen and Joseph Needham (ed.), Celestial Lancets: A History and Rationale of Acupuncture and Moxa, London and New York: Routledge Curzon, pp. xxv–li, ISBN 0-7007-1458-8.
- Sivin, Nathan (1993), "Huang ti nei ching" 黃帝內經, in Michael Loewe (ed.), Early Chinese Texts: a Bibliographical Guide, Berkeley, California: The Society for the Study of Early China AND The Institute of East Asian Studies, University of California, Berkeley, pp. 196–215, ISBN 1-55729-043-1.
- Unschuld, Paul U.; Zheng, Jingsheng (2005), "Manuscripts as sources in the history of Chinese medicine", in Vivienne Lo and Christopher Cullen (ed.), Medieval Chinese medicine: The Dunhuang medical manuscripts, London and New York: RoutledgeCurzon, pp. 19–44, ISBN 0-415-34295-3.
