= Taoism =

Traditionally Chinese religious and philosophical tradition

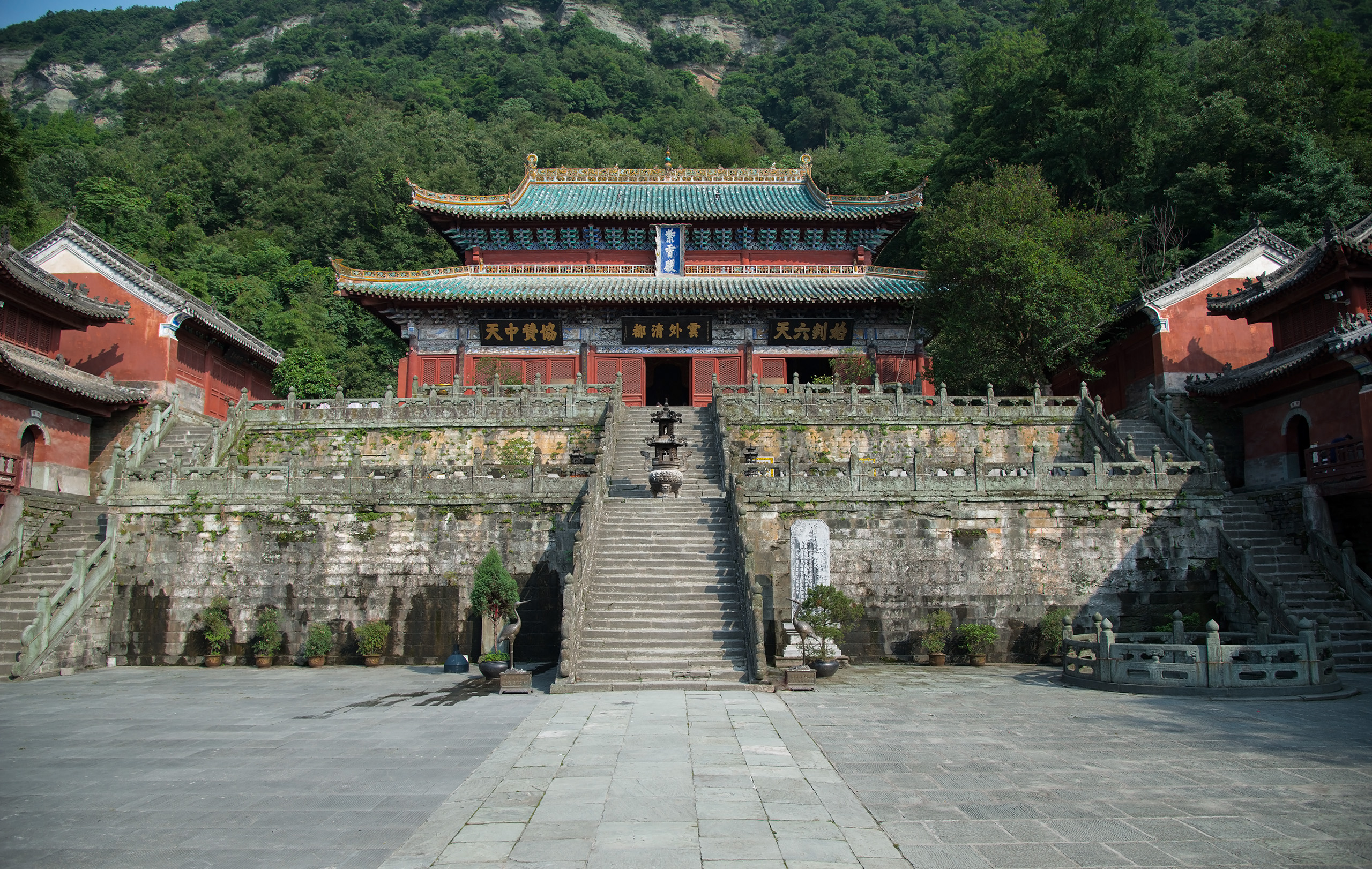
- Purple Cloud Temple in the Wudang Mountains, part of the Sacred Mountains of Taoism
- Classification: East Asian
- Scripture: Tao Te Ching
- Theology: Nontheism and polytheism
- Region: Inner China
- Language: Classical Chinese
- Founder: Laozi
- Number of followers: est. ▼173 million (referred to as Taoists)

Taoism or Daoism (/ˈtaʊ.ɪzəm/, /ˈdaʊ.ɪzəm/) is a philosophical and religious tradition indigenous to China, emphasizing harmony with the Tao (道). With a range of meanings and interpretations in Chinese philosophy, translations of Tao include 'way', 'road', 'path', or 'technique', all dependent on intention as the Chinese language is polysemic in design, but generally understood in the Taoist sense as an enigmatic process of transformation ultimately underlying what is understood as reality. Taoist thought has informed the development of various practices within the Chinese societal history, including traditional medicine, meditation, astrology, qigong, feng shui, and internal alchemy. A common goal of Taoist practice is self-cultivation, to understand and embody a deeper appreciation and connection to the concept of the Tao, and self understanding by living a more harmonious existence and experience with nature as its expression. Taoist ethics generally emphasize as a foundation the embodiment of the three treasures that include compassion, humility and frugality, the virtues of effortless action (Wu wei), naturalness, simplicity, (Wuji) that then naturally aligns with the virtues of the five phases (Wuxing).

In religious Taoism it is treated as a distinct tradition with its own scriptures, priestly monastic lineages, rites and ritual systems, it has long been closely intertwined with the local Chinese folk religion of the people or laity, making the boundary often blurred in societal practice.

The core of Taoist thought crystallized during the early Warring States period (c. 450 – c. 300 BCE), during which the epigrammatic Tao Te Ching and the anecdotal Zhuangzi—widely regarded as the fundamental texts of Taoist philosophy—were largely compiled. They form the core of a body of Taoist writings accrued over the following centuries, which were assembled by monks into the Daozang canon starting in the 5th century CE. Early Taoism drew upon diverse influences, including the Shang and Zhou state religions, Naturalism, Mohism, Confucianism, various Legalist theories, as well as the I Ching and Spring and Autumn Annals.

Taoism is frequently discussed in comparison with Confucianism since both traditions profoundly influenced Chinese thought. They later combined with Buddhism upon its introduction to China, with long-running discourses, commentaries and developments shared between Taoists and Buddhists eventually evolving into what scholars now call indigenous Chinese Buddhism. This mutual coexistence led to the emergence of the Three Teachings discourse by the 6th century CE, which examined how the three traditions could be integrated harmoniously in Chinese society.

Many Taoist denominations recognize deities, often ones shared with other traditions, which are venerated as superhuman figures exemplifying Taoist virtues. They can be roughly divided into two categories of "gods" and xian ("immortals"). Xian were immortal beings with vast supernatural powers, also describing a principled, moral person. Since Taoist thought is syncretic and deeply rooted in Chinese culture for millennia, it is often unclear which denominations should be considered "Taoist".

The title daoshi ("Taoist master") is traditionally reserved for ordained clergy within Taoist organizations, who distinguish their formal traditions from those of Chinese folk religion. Though generally lacking motivation for strong hierarchies, Taoist philosophy has often served as a theoretical foundation for politics, warfare, and Taoist organizations. Taoist secret societies precipitated the Yellow Turban Rebellion during the late Han dynasty, attempting to create what has been characterized as a Taoist theocracy.

Today, Taoism is one of five religious doctrines officially recognized by the Chinese government, also having official status in Hong Kong and Macau. It is considered a major religion in Taiwan, and also has significant populations of adherents throughout the Sinosphere and Southeast Asia. In the West, Taoism has taken on various forms, both those keeping to historical practice, as well as highly synthesized practices variously characterized as new religious movements.

== Terminology ==
Taoism
- The Chinese character 道, which represents Tao and is often translated as 'way', 'path', 'technique', or 'doctrine'

Chinese name
- Chinese: 道教
- Hanyu Pinyin: Dàojiào
- Literal meaning: "Religion of the Way"
Transcriptions
Standard Mandarin
- Hanyu Pinyin: Dàojiào
- Bopomofo: ㄉㄠˋ ㄐㄧㄠˋ
- Gwoyeu Romatzyh: Dawjiaw
- Wade–Giles: Tao^{4}-chiao^{4}
- Tongyong Pinyin: Dào-jiào
- Yale Romanization: Dàujyàu
- IPA: [tâʊ.tɕjâʊ]
Wu
- Romanization: Doh^{入} goh^{平}
Yue: Cantonese
- Yale Romanization: Douhgaau
- Jyutping: dou6 gaau3
- IPA: [tɔw˨ kaw˧]
Southern Min
- Hokkien POJ: Tō-kàu
- Tâi-lô: Tō-kàu
Middle Chinese
- Middle Chinese: dáw kæ̀w
Old Chinese
- Baxter–Sagart (2014): *[kə.l]ˤuʔ s.kˤraw-s

Vietnamese name
- Vietnamese alphabet: Đạo giáo
- Chữ Hán: 道教

Korean name
- Hangul: 도교
- Hanja: 道敎
Transcriptions
- Revised Romanization: Dogyo
- McCune–Reischauer: Togyo

Japanese name
- Kanji: 道教
Transcriptions
- Revised Hepburn: Dōkyō

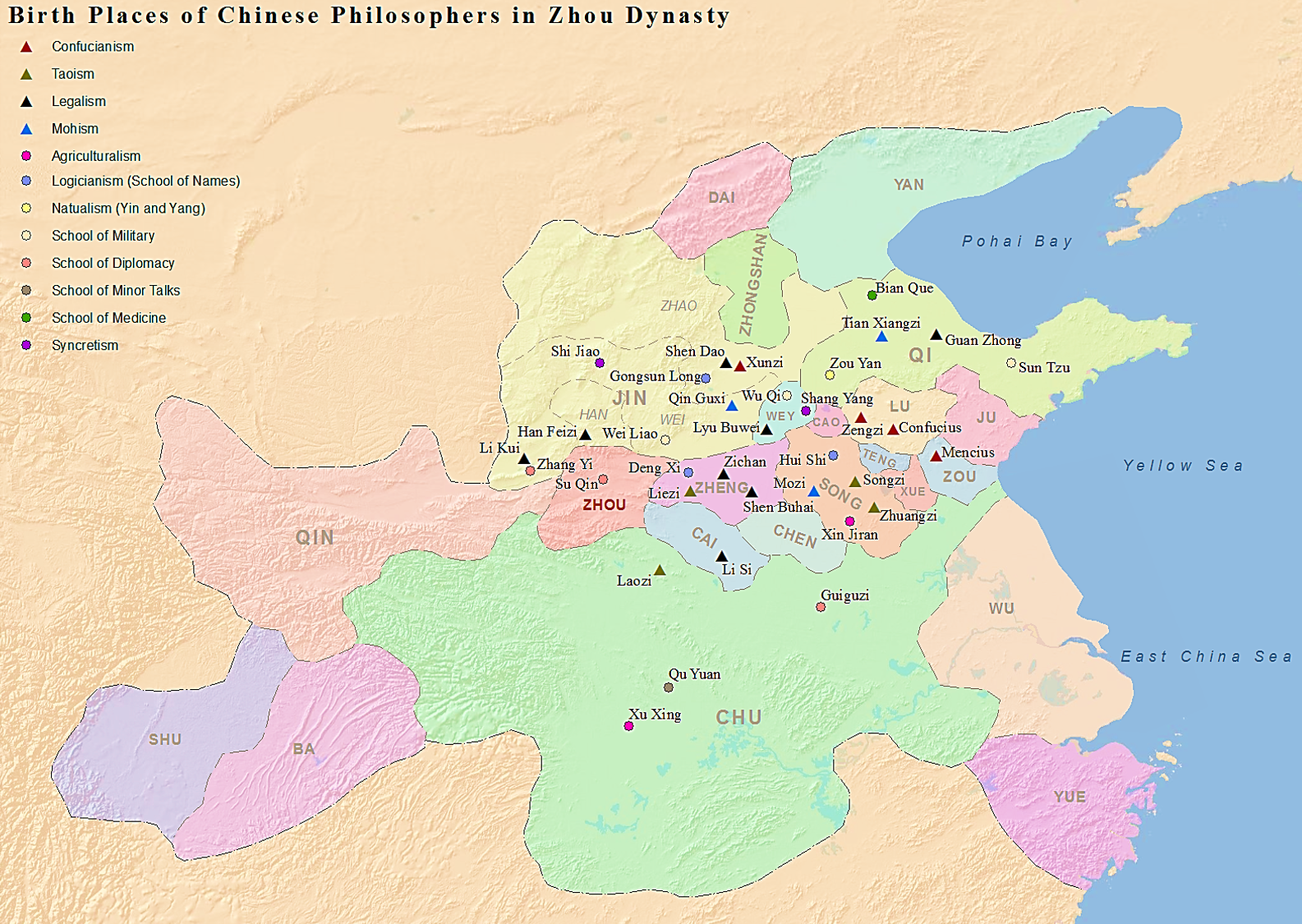
The birthplaces of notable Chinese philosophers from the Hundred Schools of Thought in the Zhou dynasty. Philosophers of Taoism are marked by triangles in dark green.

== Linguistic aspects ==
=== Pronunciation and etymology ===
"Tao" and "Dao" are different romanized spellings of the same Chinese word: 道.

- "Tao" is the romanized spelling in the Wade–Giles system, which was predominant in English-speaking countries until the late 20th century, and remains in use for certain terms with strongly established spellings.
- "Dao" is the romanized spelling in the Hanyu Pinyin system, officially adopted in China in the 1950s and the Library of Congress in 2000, which has largely replaced Wade–Giles romanization in academic sources.

The Standard Chinese pronunciation of 道 is /tau̯˥˨/. Neither an English pronunciation like /daʊ/ (an English pronunciation of "Dao") nor an English pronunciation like /tʰaʊ/ (an English pronunciation of "Tao") is the same as the Standard Chinese pronunciation of 道, whose initial consonant is neither voiced nor aspirated.

One authority calls the pronunciation with a ⟨t⟩ as in "tie" (with a /tʰ/) to be a "mispronunciation" originally caused by the "clumsy Wade–Giles system", which misled most readers. Standard Chinese phonology does not have the same sound inventory as English phonology; the Wade–Giles romanization system provides spellings in the Latin alphabet, but they are not meant to indicate an exact English pronunciation in the same way as though they were English words.

=== Classification as philosophy and religion ===
The English word Taoism is often used to translate two distinct terms in Chinese:

Daojia (道家; dàojiā; “School/Tradition of the Dao”) is a Han-dynasty label used to classify teachings and texts associated with the dao ("the Way"). The expression daojia is traced to the early Han historian Sima Tan (d. 110 BCE), where it appears as part of a scheme for organizing “six schools”: Yin-Yang, Confucian, Mohist, Legalist, School of Names, and Taoist. The term is commonly applied, particularly in Western scholarship, with reference to the early Chinese philosophical texts Tao Te Ching (also called the Laozi) and the Zhuangzi, as well as later related philosophical developments such as Xuanxue ("Neo-Daoism").

Daojiao (道教; dàojiào; “Teachings of the Dao,” often rendered “Taoism” or "Daoism" in the sense of an organized religion). The term was coined by Lu Xiujing (406–477), a key figure in the early Lingbao movement and architect of the early Taoist tradition, in order to distinguish Taoism from Buddhism. In scholarship, it is often interpreted as the Taoist "religion proper", referring to later organized Taoist schools, institutional structures (such as temples and priesthoods), and religious practices and rituals. The first instance of Taoism as a proper religious community is generally traced back to the Way of the Celestial Masters tradition founded in 142 CE.

Early scholarship on Taoism classified these terms as Philosophical Taoism and Religious Taoism, respectively. This distinction, traced to the Protestant missionary James Legge (1815–1897), remains present in many non-specialist texts such as world religion textbooks. However, Taoist scholars themselves have increasingly moved away from this classification, with Komjathy calling it "wholly inaccurate and untenable." Komjathy notes even early "classical Taoism" already consisted of several characteristic features of religion, such as a cosmology centered on the Dao, specific practices like meditation, and aims of a mystical union. Philosopher Chung-ying Cheng likewise views Taoism as a religion embedded into Chinese history and tradition, while also assuming many different "forms of philosophy and practical wisdom". Chung-ying Cheng also noted that the Taoist view of 'heaven' mainly from "observation and meditation, [though] the teaching of [the Tao] can also include the way of heaven independently of human nature". Sinologists such as Isabelle Robinet and Livia Kohn state that "Taoism has never been a unified religion, and has constantly consisted of a combination of teachings based on a variety of original revelations." The distinction is fraught with hermeneutic difficulties when attempting to categorize different schools, sects, and movements.

The bagua, a symbol commonly used to represent the Tao and its pursuit

=== Adherents ===
Traditionally, the Chinese language does not have terms defining lay people adhering to the doctrines or the practices of Taoism, who fall instead within the field of folk religion. Taoist, in Western sinology, is traditionally used to translate daoshi (道士; 'master of the Tao'), thus strictly defining the priests of Taoism, ordained clergymen of a Taoist institution who "represent Taoist culture on a professional basis", are experts of Taoist liturgy, and therefore can employ this knowledge and ritual skill for the benefit of a community.

This role of Taoist priests reflects the definition of Taoism as a "liturgical framework for the development of local cults", in other words a scheme or structure for Chinese religion, proposed first by the scholar and Taoist initiate Kristofer Schipper in The Taoist Body (1986). Taoshi are comparable to the non-Taoist ritual masters (法師) of vernacular traditions (the so-called faism) within Chinese religion.

The term dàojiàotú (道教徒; 'follower of Dao'), with the meaning of "Taoist" as "lay member or believer of Taoism", is a modern invention that goes back to the introduction of the Western category of "organized religion" in China in the 20th century, but it has no significance for most of Chinese society in which Taoism continues to be an "order" of the larger body of Chinese religion.

== History ==
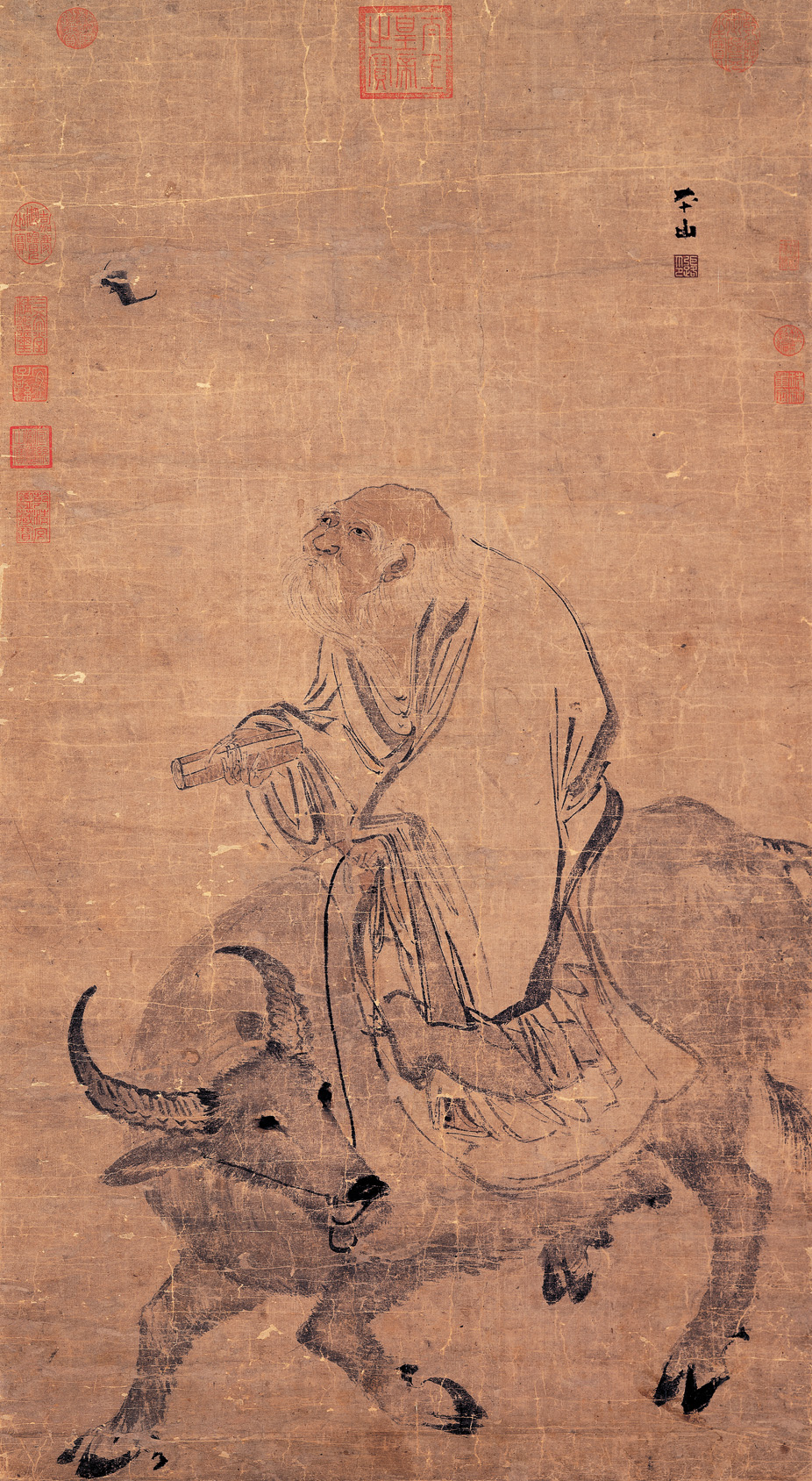
Laozi Riding an Ox by Zhang Lu (c. 1464–1538)

=== Classical Taoism and its sources ===
Scholars like Harold Roth argue that early Taoism was a series of "inner-cultivation lineages" of master-disciple communities, emphasizing a contentless and nonconceptual apophatic meditation as a way of achieving union with the Tao. According to Louis Komjathy, their worldview "emphasized the Dao as sacred, and the universe and each individual being as a manifestation of the Dao". These communities were also closely related to and intermixed with the fangshi (method master) communities. Other scholars, like Russell Kirkland, argue that before the Han dynasty, there were no real "Taoists" or "Taoism". Instead, there were various sets of behaviors, practices, and interpretative frameworks (like the ideas of the I Ching, School of Naturalists, as well as Mohist, "Legalist", and "Confucian" ideas), which were eventually synthesized into the first organized forms of "Taoism".

The main early Taoist sources include the Neiye, the Zhuangzi, and the Tao Te Ching. The Tao Te Ching, attributed to Laozi, was composed between the 4th and 6th century BCE. A common tradition holds that Laozi founded Taoism. Laozi's historicity is disputed, with many scholars seeing him as a legendary founding figure.

While Taoism is often regarded in the West as arising from Laozi, many Chinese Taoists claim that the Yellow Emperor formulated many of their precepts, including the quest for "long life". Traditionally, the Yellow Emperor's founding of Taoism was said to have been because he "dreamed of an ideal kingdom whose tranquil inhabitants lived in harmonious accord with the natural law and possessed virtues remarkably like those espoused by early Taoism. On waking from his dream, Huangdi sought to" bring about "these virtues in his own kingdom, to ensure order and prosperity among the inhabitants".

Afterwards, Taoism developed and grew into two sects; One is Zhengyi Taoism, which mainly focuses on spells, and the other is Quanzhen Taoism, which mainly focuses on practicing inner alchemy. Overall, traditional Taoist thought, content, and sects are varied, reflecting the ideal of "absorbing everything inside and mixing everything outside".

Early Taoism drew on the ideas found in the religion of the Shang dynasty and the Zhou dynasty, such as their use of divination, ancestor worship, and the idea of Heaven (Tian) and its relationship to humanity. According to modern scholars of Taoism, such as Kirkland and Livia Kohn, Taoist philosophy also developed by drawing on numerous schools of thought from the Warring States period (4th to 3rd centuries BCE), including Mohism, Confucianism, Legalist theorists (like Shen Buhai and Han Fei, which speak of wu wei), the School of Naturalists (from which Taoism draws its main cosmological ideas, yin and yang and the five phases), and the Chinese classics, especially the I Ching and the Lüshi Chunqiu.

Meanwhile, Isabelle Robinet identifies four components in the emergence of Taoism: the teachings found in the Tao Te Ching and Zhuangzi, techniques for achieving ecstasy, practices for achieving longevity and becoming an immortal (xian), and practices for exorcism. Robinet states that some elements of Taoism may be traced to prehistoric folk religions in China. In particular, many Taoist practices drew from the Warring States era phenomena of the wu (Chinese shamans) and the fangshi ("method masters", which probably derived from the "archivist-soothsayers of antiquity").

Both terms were used to designate individuals dedicated to "magic, medicine, divination, ... methods of longevity and to ecstatic wanderings" as well as exorcism. The fangshi were philosophically close to the School of Naturalists and relied greatly on astrological and calendrical speculations in their divinatory activities. Female shamans played an important role in the early Taoist tradition, which was particularly strong in the southern state of Chu. Early Taoist movements developed their own tradition in contrast to shamanism while also absorbing shamanic elements.

During the early period, some Taoists lived as hermits or recluses who did not participate in political life, while others sought to establish a harmonious society based on Taoist principles. Zhuang Zhou (c. 370–290 BCE) was the most influential of the Taoist hermits. Some scholars hold that since he lived in the south, he may have been influenced by Chinese shamanism. Zhuang Zhou and his followers insisted they were the heirs of ancient traditions and the ways of life of by-then legendary kingdoms. Pre-Taoist philosophers and mystics whose activities may have influenced Taoism included shamans, naturalists skilled in understanding the properties of plants and geology, diviners, early environmentalists, tribal chieftains, court scribes and commoner members of governments, members of the nobility in Chinese states, and the descendants of refugee communities.

Significant movements in early Taoism disregarded the existence of gods, and many who believed in gods thought they were subject to the natural law of the Tao, in a similar nature to all other life. Roughly contemporaneously to the Tao Te Ching, some believed the Tao was a force that was the "basis of all existence" and more powerful than the gods, while being a god-like being that was an ancestor and a mother goddess.

Early Taoists studied the natural world in attempts to find what they thought were supernatural laws that governed existence. Taoists created scientific principles that were the first of their kind in China, and the belief system has been known to merge scientific, philosophical, and religious conceits from close to its beginning.

=== Early organized Taoism ===
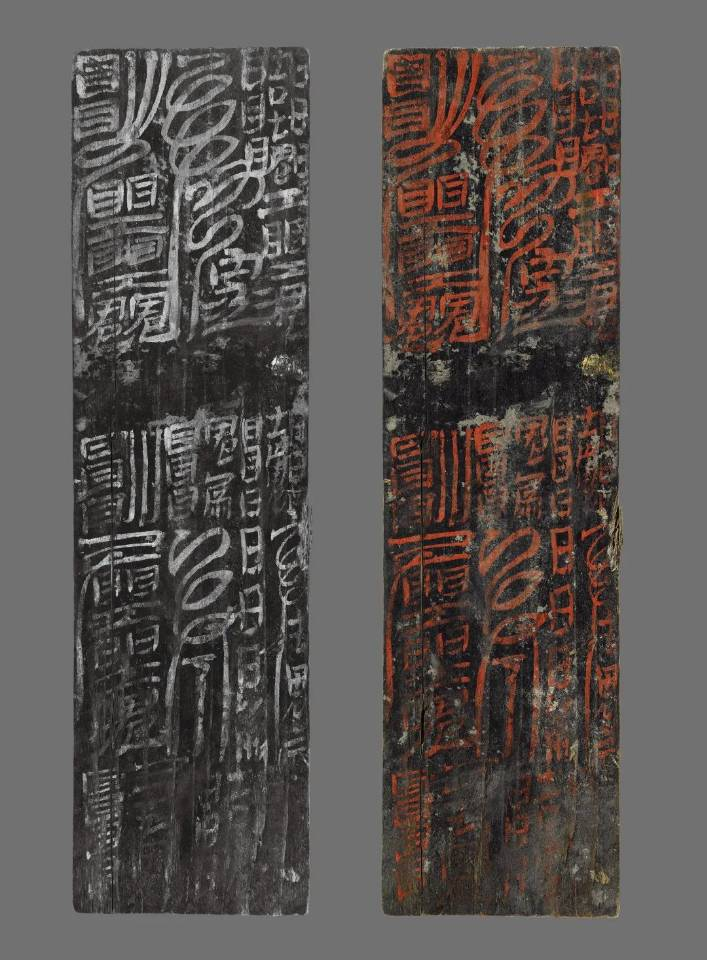
Han dynasty Chinese talisman, part of the Wucheng Bamboo-slips

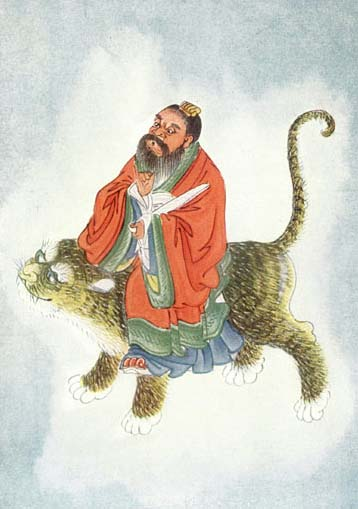
Zhang Daoling, the first Celestial Master

By the Han dynasty (202 BCE – 220 CE), the various sources of Taoism had coalesced into a coherent tradition of ritualists in the state of Shu (modern Sichuan). One of the earliest forms of Taoism was the Han era (2nd century BCE) Huang–Lao movement, which was an influential school of thought at this time. The Huainanzi and the Taipingjing are important sources from this period. An unorganized form of Taoism was popular in the Han dynasty that syncretized many preexisting forms in multiple ways for different groups existed during a rough span of time throughout the 2nd century BCE. Also during the Han, the earliest extant commentaries on the Tao Te Ching were written: the Heshang Gong commentary and the Xiang'er commentary.

The first organized form of Taoism was the Way of the Celestial Masters, which developed from the Five Pecks of Rice movement at the end of the 2nd century CE. The latter had been founded by Zhang Daoling, who was said to have had a vision of Laozi in 142 CE and claimed that the world was coming to an end. Zhang sought to teach people to repent and prepare for the coming cataclysm, after which they would become the seeds of a new era of great peace. It was a mass movement in which men and women could act as libationers and tend to the commoners. A related movement arose in Shandong called the "Way of Great Peace", seeking to create a new world by replacing the Han dynasty. This movement led to the Yellow Turban Rebellion, and after years of bloody war, they were crushed.

The Celestial Masters movement survived this period and did not take part in attempting to replace the Han. As such, they grew and became an influential religion during the Three Kingdoms period, focusing on ritual confession and petition, as well as developing a well-organized religious structure. The Celestial Masters school was officially recognized by the warlord Cao Cao in 215 CE, legitimizing Cao Cao's rise to power in return. Laozi received imperial recognition as a divinity in the mid-2nd century BCE.

Another important early Taoist movement was Taiqing (Great Clarity), which was a tradition of external alchemy that sought immortality through the concoction of elixirs, often using toxic substances like cinnabar, lead, mercury, and realgar, as well as ritual and purificatory practices.

After this point, Taoism did not have nearly as significant an effect on the passing of law as the syncretic Confucian–Legalist tradition.

=== Three Kingdoms and Six Dynasties eras ===
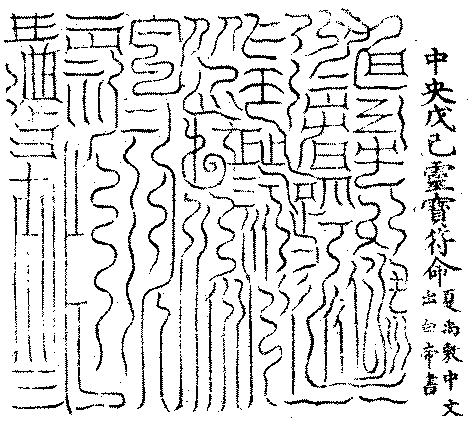
A Taoist talisman from one the Lingbao Scriptures

The Three Kingdoms period saw the rise of the Xuanxue (Mysterious Learning or Deep Wisdom) tradition, which focused on philosophical inquiry and integrated Confucian teachings with Taoist thought. The movement included scholars like Wang Bi (226–249), He Yan (d. 249), Xiang Xiu (223?–300), Guo Xiang (d. 312), and Pei Wei (267–300). Another later influential figure was the 4th century alchemist Ge Hong, who wrote a key Taoist work on inner cultivation, the Baopuzi (Master Embracing Simplicity).

The Six Dynasties (316–589) era saw the rise of two new Taoist traditions, the Shangqing and Lingbao schools. Shangqing was based on a series of revelations by gods and spirits to a certain Yang Xi between 364 and 370. As Livia Kohn writes, these revelations included detailed descriptions of the heavens as well as "specific methods of shamanic travels or ecstatic excursions, visualizations, and alchemical concoctions". The Shangqing revelations also introduced many new Taoist scriptures.

Similarly, between 397 and 402, Ge Chaofu compiled a series of scriptures that later served as the foundation of the Lingbao school, which was most influential during the later Song dynasty (960–1279) and focused on scriptural recitation and the use of talismans for harmony and longevity. The Lingbao school practiced purification rituals called "purgations" in which talismans were empowered. Lingbao also adopted Mahayana Buddhist elements. According to Kohn, they "integrated aspects of Buddhist cosmology, worldview, scriptures, and practices, and created a vast new collection of Taoist texts in close imitation of Buddhist sutras". Louis Komjathy also notes that they adopted the Mahayana Buddhist universalism in its promotion of "universal salvation" (pudu).

During this period, Louguan, the first Taoist monastic institution (influenced by Buddhist monasticism) was established in the Zhongnan Mountains by a local Taoist master named Yin Tong. This tradition was called the Northern Celestial masters, and their main scripture was the Xishengjing (Scripture of Western Ascension).

During the 6th century, Taoists attempted to unify the various traditions into one integrated Taoism that could compete with Buddhism and Confucianism. To do this they adopted the schema known as the "three caverns", first developed by the scholar Lu Xiujing (406–477) based on the "three vehicles" of Buddhism. The three caverns were: Perfection (Dongzhen), associated with the Three Sovereigns; Mystery (Dongxuan), associated with Lingbao; and Spirit (Dongshen), associated with the Supreme Clarity tradition. Lu Xiujing also used this schema to arrange the Taoist scriptures and Taoist deities. Lu Xiujing worked to compile the first edition of the Daozang canon, which was published at the behest of the Chinese emperor. Thus, according to Russell Kirkland, "in several important senses, it was really Lu Hsiu-ching who founded Taoism, for it was he who first gained community acceptance for a common canon of texts, which established the boundaries, and contents, of 'the teachings of the Tao' (Tao-chiao). Lu also reconfigured the ritual activities of the tradition, and formulated a new set of liturgies, which continue to influence Taoist practice to the present day."

This period also saw the development of the Three Pure Ones, which merged the high deities from different Taoist traditions into a common trinity that has remained influential until today.

=== Later imperial dynasties ===
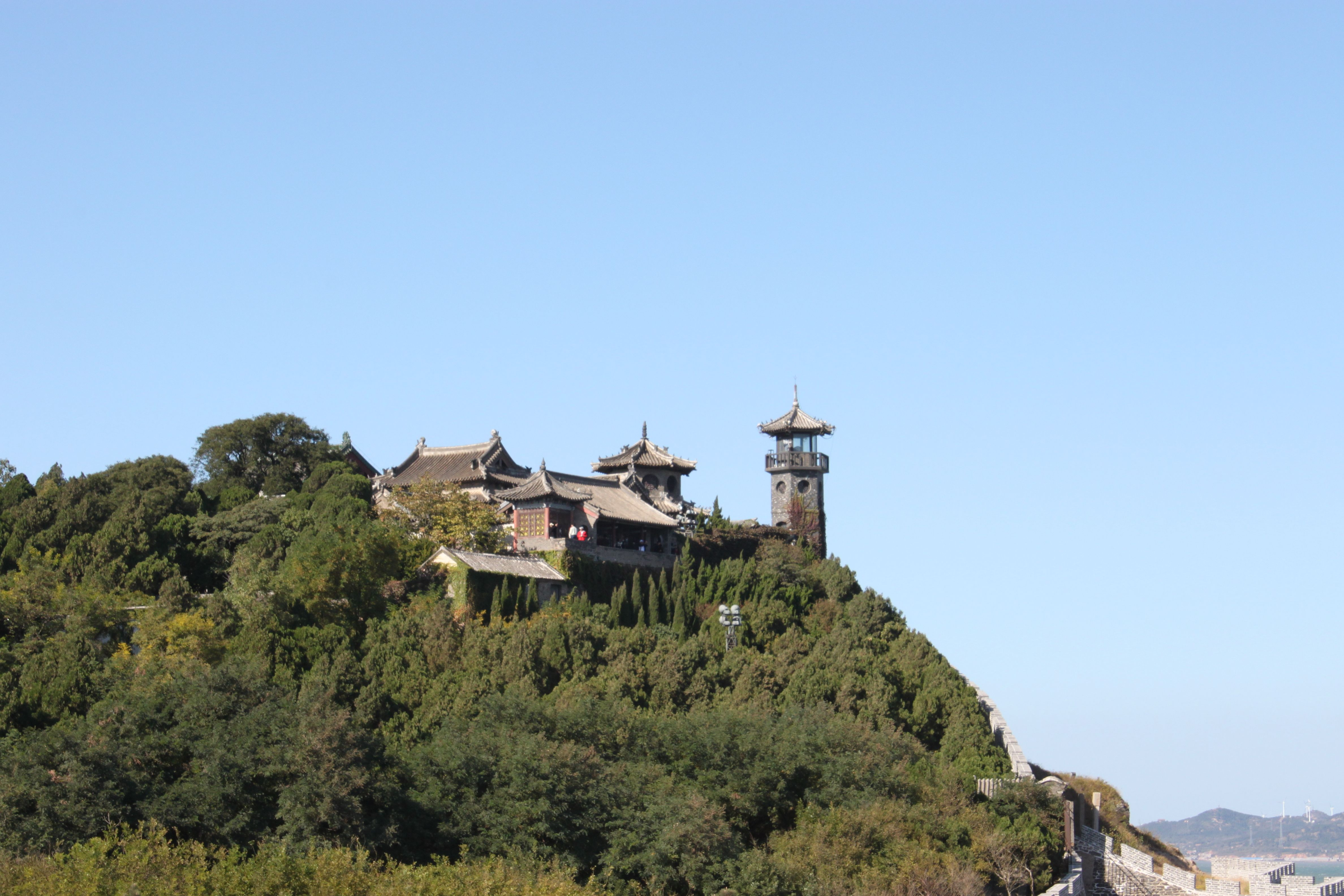
Penglai Pavilion, Shandong, where the legend of Eight Immortals is traditionally believed to take place

The new Integrated Taoism, now with a united Taoist identity, gained official status in China during the Tang dynasty. This tradition was termed daojiao. The Tang was the height of Taoist influence, during which Taoism, led by the Patriarch of Supreme Clarity, was the dominant religion in China. According to Russell Kirkland, this new Taoist synthesis had its main foundation in the Lingbao school's teachings, which was appealing to all classes of society and drew on Mahayana Buddhism.

Perhaps the most important figure of the Tang was the court Taoist and writer Du Guangting (850–933). Du wrote numerous works about Taoist rituals, history, myth, and biography. He also reorganized and edited the Daozang after a period of war and loss.

During the Tang, several emperors became patrons of Taoism, inviting priests to court to conduct rituals and enhance the prestige of the sovereign. The Gaozong Emperor even decreed that the Tao Te Ching was to be a topic in the imperial examinations. During the reign of the 7th century Emperor Taizong, the Five Dragons Temple (the first temple at the Wudang Mountains) was constructed. Wudang would eventually become a major center for Taoism and a home for Taoist martial arts (Wudang quan).

Emperor Xuanzong (r. 712–755) was also a devoted Taoist who wrote various Taoist works, and according to Livia Kohn, "had frequent meetings with senior masters, ritual specialists, Taoist poets, and official patriarchs, such as Sima Chengzhen." He reorganized imperial rituals based on Taoist forms, sponsored Taoist shrines and monasteries, and introduced a separate examination system based on Taoism. Another important Taoist figure of the Tang dynasty was Lü Dongbin, who is considered the founder of the jindan meditation tradition and an influential figure in the development of neidan (internal alchemy) practices.

Likewise, several Song dynasty emperors, most notably Huizong, were active in promoting Taoism, collecting Taoist texts, and publishing updated editions of the Daozang. The Song era saw new scriptures and new movements of ritualists and Taoist rites, the most popular of which were the Thunder Rites (leifa). The Thunder rites were protection and exorcism rites that evoked the celestial department of thunder, and they became central to the new Heavenly Heart (Tianxin) tradition as well as for the Youthful Incipience (Tongchu) school.

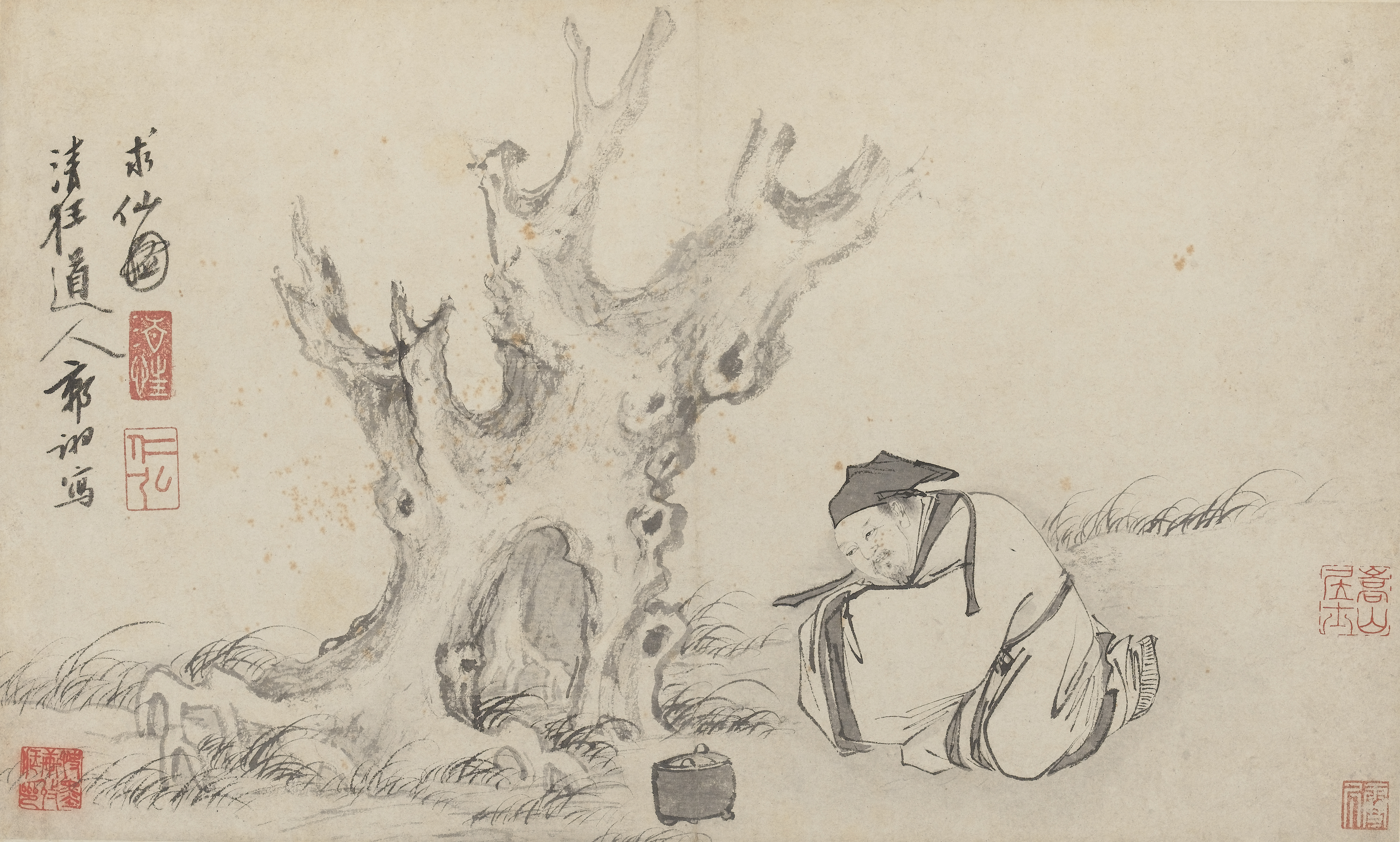
Qiu Chuji (1503) by Guo Xu

In the 12th century, the Quanzhen (Complete Perfection) School was founded in Shandong by the sage Wang Chongyang (1113–1170) to compete with religious Taoist traditions that worshipped "ghosts and gods" and largely displaced them. The school focused on inner transformation, mystical experience, monasticism, and asceticism. Quanzhen flourished during the 13th and 14th centuries and during the Yuan dynasty. The Quanzhen school was syncretic, combining elements from Buddhism and Confucianism with Taoist tradition. According to Wang Chongyang, the "three teachings" (Buddhism, Confucianism, Taoism), "when investigated, prove to be but one school". Quanzhen became the largest and most important Taoist school in China when master Qiu Chuji met with Genghis Khan who ended up making him the leader of all Chinese religions as well as exempting Quanzhen institutions from taxation. Another important Quanzhen figure was Zhang Boduan, author of the Wuzhen pian, a classic of internal alchemy, and the founder of the southern branch of Quanzhen.

During the Song era, the Zhengyi Dao tradition properly developed in Southern China among Taoists of the Chang clan. This liturgically focused tradition would continue to be supported by later emperors and survives to this day.

In Northern China during the Yuan dynasty, Taoism took inspiration from Tibetan cultural practices, Chinese folk religion (often from the western parts of Yuan territory), and Tibetan Buddhism.

Under the Ming dynasty (1368–1644), aspects of Confucianism, Taoism, and Buddhism were consciously synthesized in the Neo-Confucian school, which eventually became Imperial orthodoxy for state bureaucratic purposes. Taoist ideas also influenced Neo-Confucian thinkers like Wang Yangming and Zhan Ruoshui. During the Ming, the legends of the Eight Immortals (the most important of which is Lü Dongbin) rose to prominence, being part of local plays and folk culture. Ming emperors like the Hongwu Emperor continued to invite Taoists to court and hold Taoist rituals that were believed to enhance the power of the throne. The most important of these were connected with the Taoist deity Xuanwu, which was the main dynastic protector deity of the Ming.

The Ming era saw the rise of the Jingming ("Pure Illumination") school to prominence, which merged Taoism with Buddhist and Confucian teachings and focused on "purity, clarity, loyalty and filial piety". The school derided internal and external alchemy, fasting (bigu), and breathwork. Instead, the school focused on using mental cultivation to return to the mind's original purity and clarity (which could become obscured by desires and emotions). Key figures of this school include Xu Xun, Liu Yu, Huang Yuanji, Xu Yi, and Liu Yuanran. Some of these figures taught at the imperial capital and were awarded titles. Their emphasis on practical ethics and self-cultivation in everyday life (rather than ritual or monasticism) made it very popular among the literati class.

The Qing dynasty (1644–1912) mainly promoted Buddhism as well as Neo-Confucianism. Thus, during this period, the status and influence of Taoism declined. During the 18th century, the Qing imperial library excluded virtually all Taoist books.

The Qing era also saw the birth of the Longmen ("Dragon Gate" 龍門) school of Wang Kunyang (1552–1641), a branch of Quanzhen from southern China that became established at the White Cloud Temple. Longmen authors like Liu Yiming (1734–1821) and Min Yide (1758–1836) worked to promote and preserve Taoist inner alchemy practices through books like The Secret of the Golden Flower. The Longmen school synthesized the Quanzhen and neidan teachings with the Chan Buddhist and Neo-Confucian elements that the Jingming tradition had developed, making it widely appealing to the literati class.

=== Early modern Taoism ===
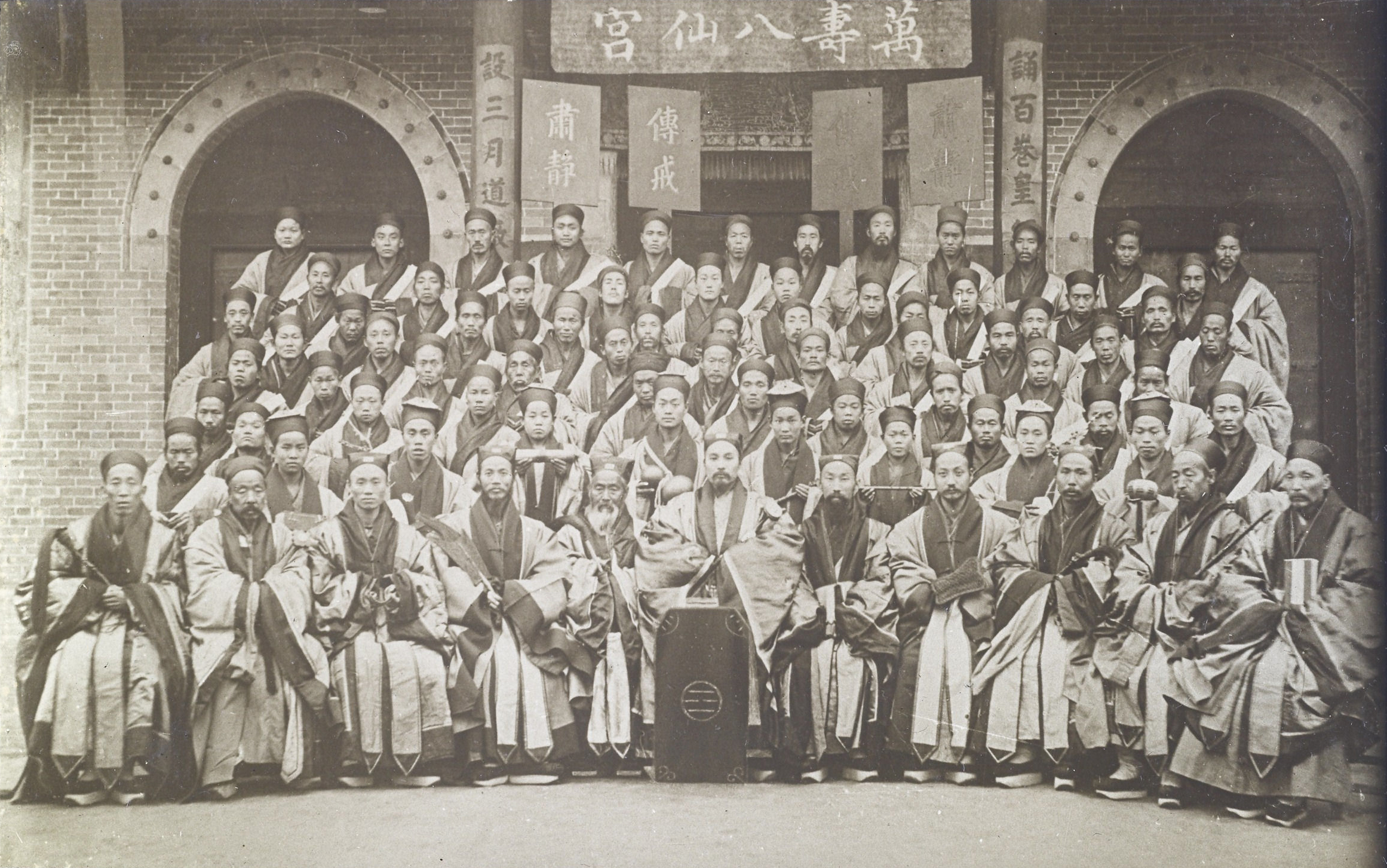
Taoist clergy of Baxian Temple, Xi'an, 1910–1911

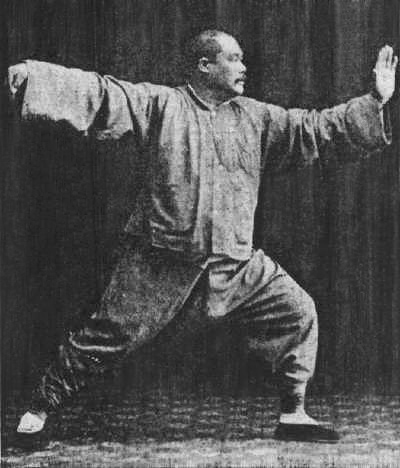
Yang Chengfu practicing tai chi

During the 19th and 20th centuries, Taoism suffered much destruction as a result of religious persecution and numerous wars and conflicts that beset China in the so-called century of humiliation. This period of persecution was caused by numerous factors including Confucian prejudices, anti-traditional Chinese modernist ideologies, European and Japanese colonialism, and Christian missionary activity. By the 20th century, only one complete copy of the Daozang survived intact, stored at the White Cloud Monastery in Beijing. A key Taoist figure during this period was Chen Yingning (1880–1969). He was a key member of the early Chinese Taoist Association and wrote numerous books promoting Taoist practice.

During the Cultural Revolution (1966–1976), many Taoist priests were laicized and sent to work camps, and many Taoist sites and temples were destroyed or converted to secular use. This period saw an exodus of Taoists out of China. They immigrated to Korea, Malaysia, Singapore, Taiwan, Thailand, and to Europe and North America. Thus, the communist repression had the consequence of making Taoism a world religion by disseminating Taoists throughout the world.

In the 1910s, Taoist doctrine about immortals and waiting until after death to live in "the dwelling of the immortals" was one of the faith's most popular and influential beliefs.

The 20th century was also a creative period for Taoism despite its many setbacks. The Taoist-influenced practice of tai chi developed during this time, led by figures like Yang Chengfu and Sun Lutang. Early proponents of tai chi, like Sun Lutang, claimed that it was a Taoist internal practice created by the Taoist immortal Zhang Sanfeng (though modern scholars note that this claim lacks credible historical evidence).

=== Late modern Taoism ===
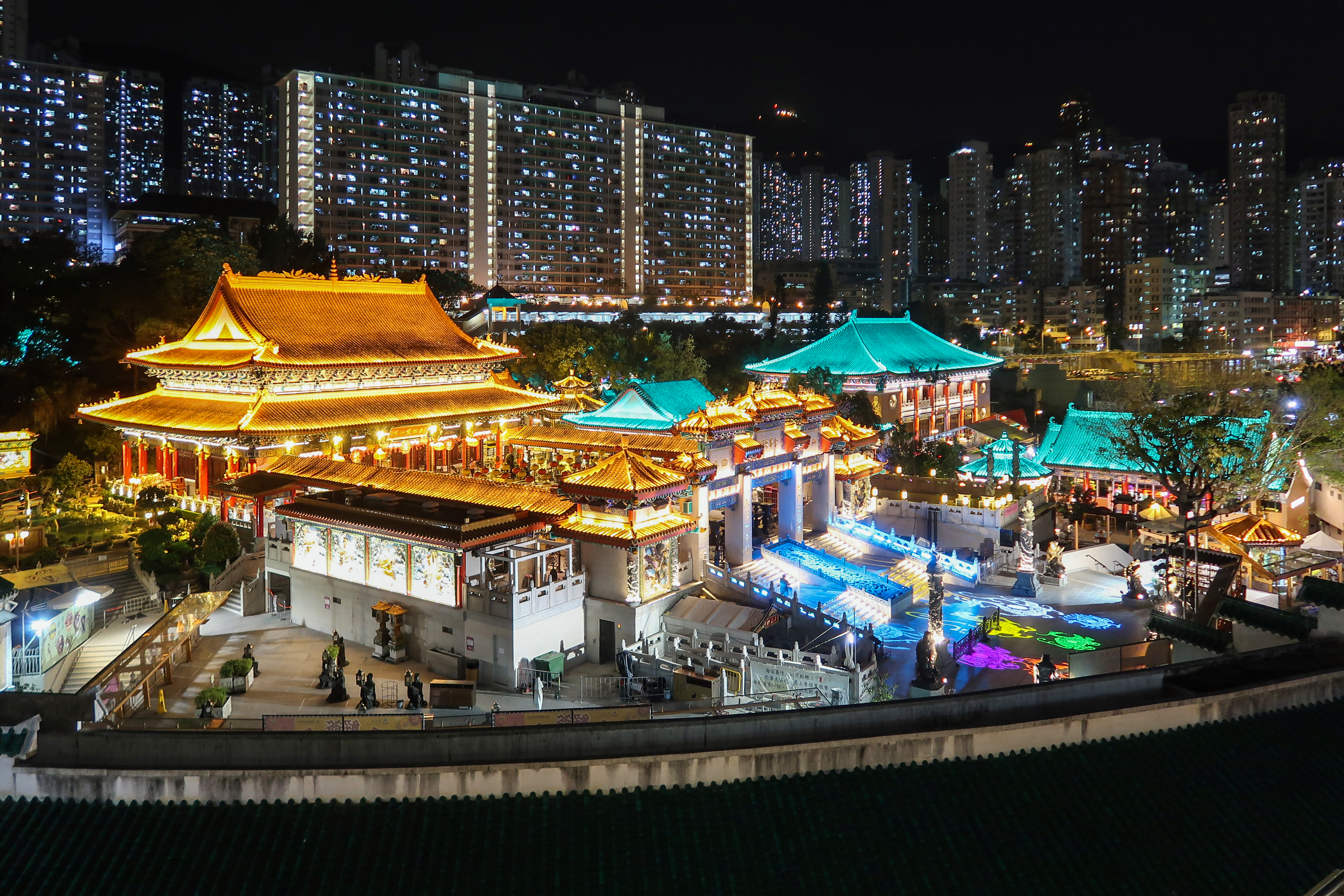
Wong Tai Sin Temple, one of the most important Taoist temples in Hong Kong

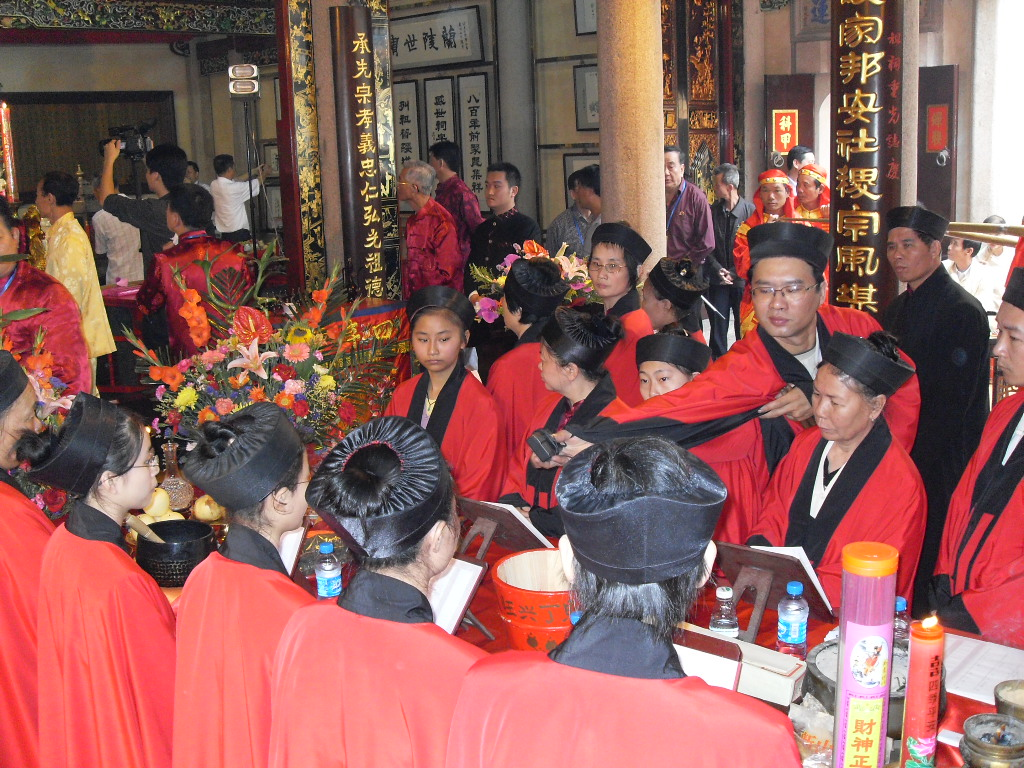
Taoist ceremony at Xiao Ancestral Temple in Chaoyang, Shantou, Guangdong

Taoism began to recover during the reform and opening up period (beginning in 1979) during which mainland China experienced increased religious freedom. This led to the restoration of many temples and communities, the publishing of Taoist literature and the preservation of Taoist material culture. Several Chinese intellectuals, like Hu Fuchen (Chinese Academy of Social Studies) and Liu Xiaogan (Chinese University of Hong Kong) have worked to developed a "New Daojia" (xin daojia), which parallels the rise of New Confucianism.

During the 1980s and 1990s, China experienced the so-called Qigong fever, which saw a surge in the popularity of Qigong practice throughout China. During this period many new Taoist and Taoist-influenced religions sprung up, the most popular being those associated with Qigong, such as Zangmigong (Tantric Qigong influenced by Tibetan Buddhism), Zhong Gong (Central Qigong), and Falun Gong, which came to be outlawed and repressed by the Chinese Communist Party (CCP).

Today, Taoism is one of five official recognized religions in the People's Republic of China. In mainland China, the government regulates its activities through the Chinese Taoist Association. Regarding the status of Taoism in mainland China, Livia Kohn writes:

Taoist institutions are state-owned, monastics are paid by the government, several bureaus compete for revenues and administrative power, and training centers require courses in Marxism as preparation for full ordination. Still, temple compounds are growing on the five sacred mountains, on Taoist mountains, and in all major cities.

The White Cloud Temple at Beijing remains the most important center for the training of Taoist monastics on the mainland, while the five sacred mountains of China also contain influential Taoist centers. Other key sites include: Wudangshan, Mount Longhu, Mount Qiyun, Mount Qingcheng, Mount Tai, Zhongnan mountains, Mount Mao, and Mount Lao. Meanwhile, Taoism is also practiced much more freely in Taiwan and Hong Kong, where it is a major religion and retains unique features and movements that differ from mainland Taoism. Taoism is also practiced throughout the wider East Asian cultural sphere.

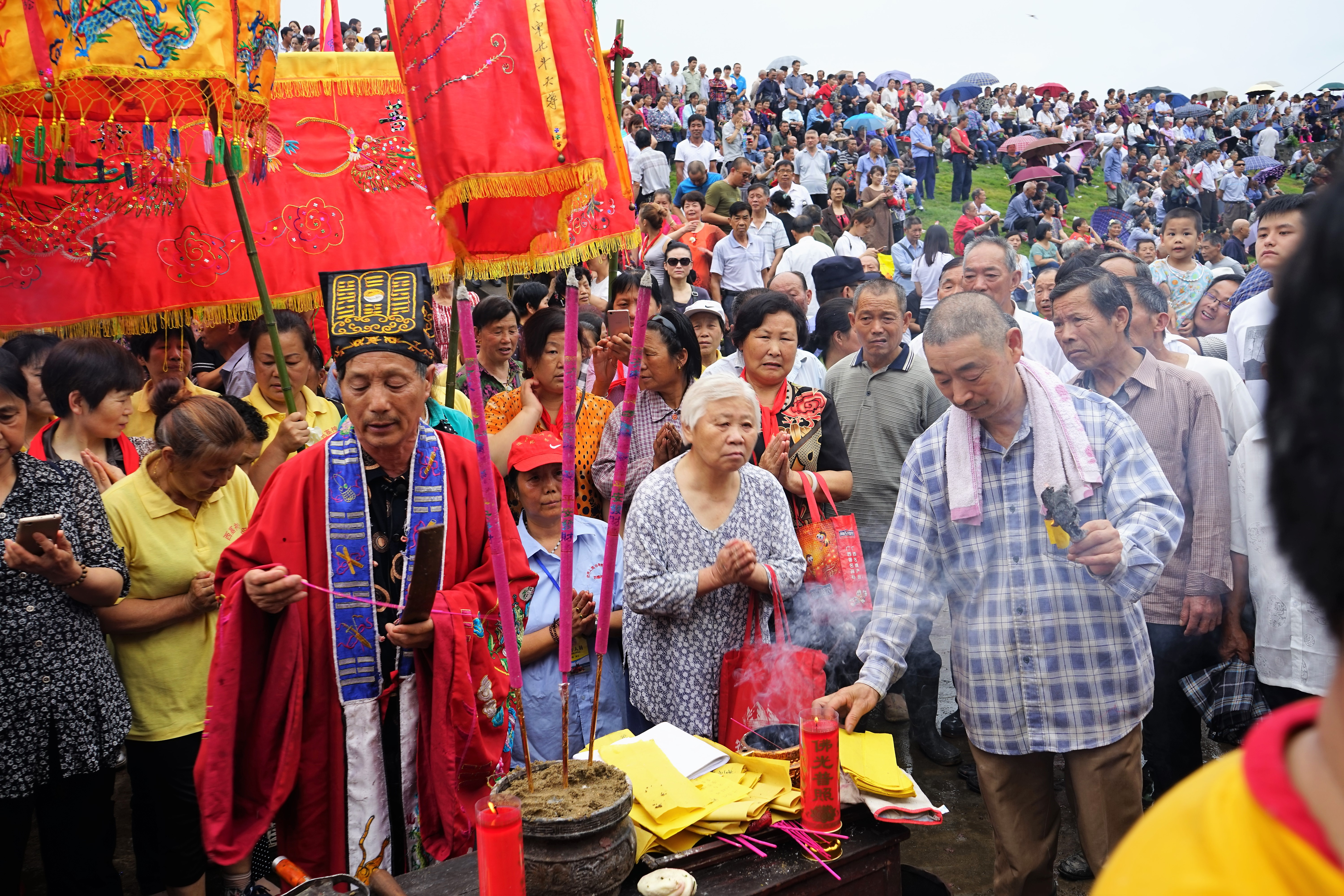
Taoist priest at the Xisai Sacred Boat Rally, Hubei

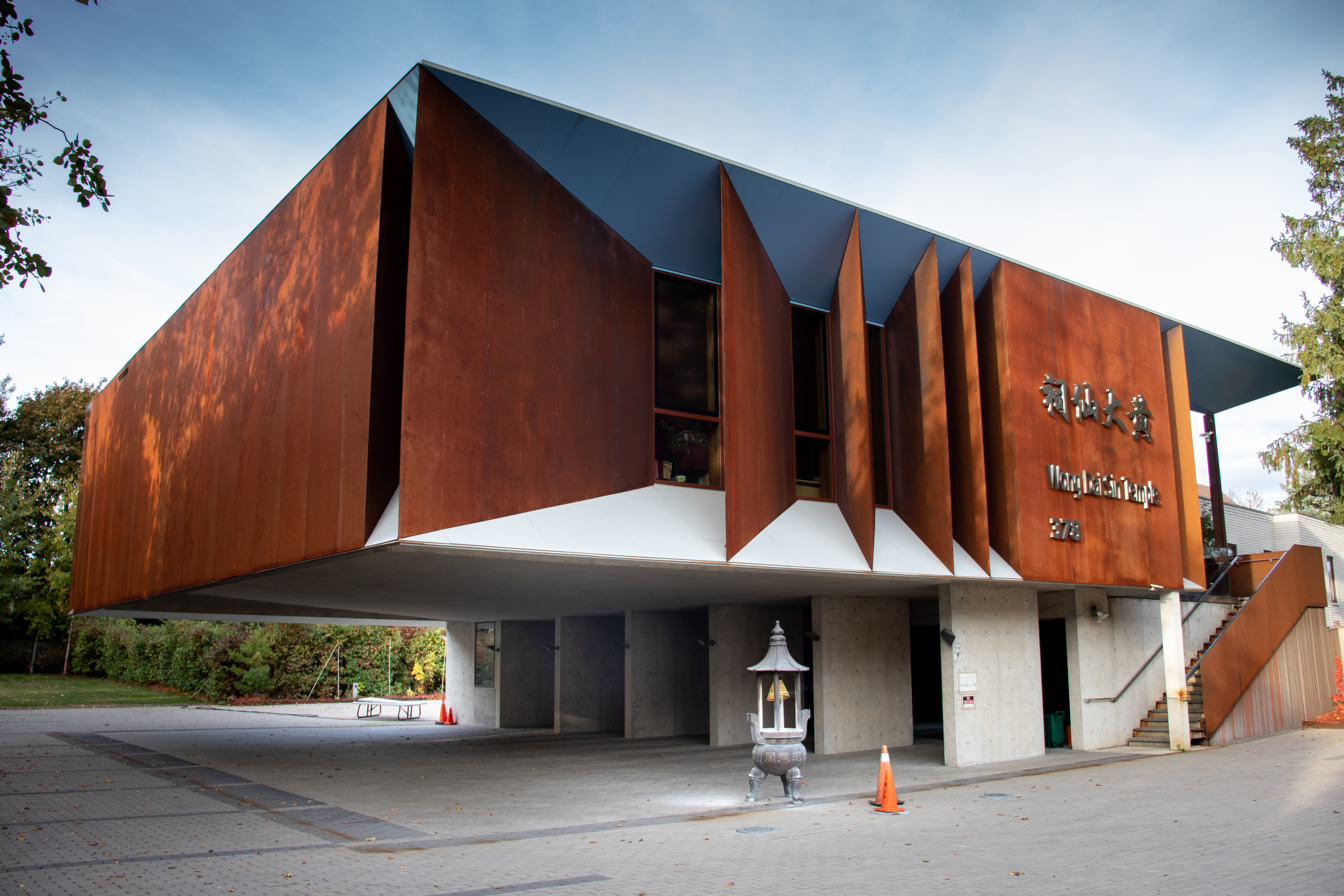
Wong Dai Sin Temple in Markham, Ontario, Canada

Outside of China, many traditionally Taoist practices have spread, especially through Chinese emigration as well as conversion by non-Chinese. Taoist-influenced practices, like tai chi and qigong, are also popular around the world. Its influence is ubiquitous, especially in divination and magical practices. As such, Taoism is now a religion with a global distribution.

Taoism has been traditionally associated with Northern China, Southern China, and Western China, and originated from Southern China.

During the late 20th century, Taoism began to spread to the Western world, leading to various forms of Taoist communities in the West, with Taoist publications, websites, meditation and Tai chi centers, and translations of Taoist texts by western scholars as well as non-specialists. Taoist classics like the Tao Te Ching have also become popular in the New Age movement and in "popular Western Taoism", a kind of popularized hybrid spirituality. According to Louis Komjathy, this "popular Western Taoism" is associated with popular translations and interpretations of the Tao Te Ching and the work of popular figures like James Legge, Alan Watts, John Blofeld, Gia-fu Feng, and Bruce Lee. This popular spirituality also draws on Chinese martial arts, (which are often unrelated to Taoism proper), American Transcendentalism, 1960s counterculture, New Age spirituality, the perennial philosophy, and alternative medicine.

On the other hand, traditionally minded Taoists in the West are often either ethnically Chinese or generally assume some level of sinicization, especially the adoption of Chinese language and culture. This is because, for most traditional Taoists, the religion is not seen as separate from Chinese ethnicity and culture. As such, most Western convert Taoist groups are led either by Chinese teachers or by teachers who studied with Chinese teachers. Some prominent Western Taoist associations include: Asociación de Taoism de España, Association Francaise Daoiste, British Daoist Association, Daoist Foundation (San Diego, California), American Taoist and Buddhist Association (New York), Ching Chung Taoist Association (San Francisco), Universal Society of the Integral Way (Ni Hua-Ching), and Sociedade Taoista do Brasil.

Particularly popular in the West are groups that focus on internal martial arts like tai chi, as well as qigong and meditation. A smaller set of groups also focus around internal alchemy, such as Mantak Chia's Healing Tao. While traditional Taoism initially arrived in the West through Chinese immigrants, more recently, Western run Taoist temples have also appeared, such as the Taoist Sanctuary in San Diego and the Dayuan Circle in San Francisco. Kohn notes that all of these centers "combine traditional ritual services with Tao Te Ching and I Ching philosophy as well as with various health practices, such as breathing, diet, meditation, qigong, and soft martial arts".

== Teachings ==
=== Tao ===
The opening line of the Tao Te Ching begins with: "The Tao that can be told is not eternal Tao." This is generally interpreted to mean Tao is, on an ultimate level, indescribable and transcends all analysis and definition.

Bronze script for tao 道

Tao (or Dao) can mean "way", "road", "channel", "path", "doctrine", or "line". Livia Kohn describes the Tao as "the underlying cosmic power which creates the universe, supports culture and the state, saves the good and punishes the wicked. Literally 'the way', Tao refers to the way things develop naturally, the way nature moves along, and living beings growing and declining in accordance with cosmic laws." Likewise, Louis Komjathy writes that Taoists have described the Tao as "dark" (xuan), "indistinct" (hu), "obscure" (huang), and "silent" (mo).

According to Komjathy, the Tao has four primary characteristics: "source of all existence", "unnamable mystery", "all-pervading sacred presence", and "universe as cosmological process". As such, Taoist thought can be seen as monistic (the Tao is one reality), panenhenic (seeing nature as sacred), and panentheistic (the Tao is both the sacred world and what is beyond it, immanent and transcendent). Similarly, Wing-tsit Chan describes the Tao as an "ontological ground" and as "the One, which is natural, spontaneous, eternal, nameless, and indescribable. It is at once the beginning of all things and the way in which all things pursue their course." The Tao is thus an "organic order", which is not a willful or self-conscious creator, but an infinite and boundless natural pattern.

Furthermore, the Tao is something that individuals can find immanent in themselves and in natural and social patterns. Thus, the Tao is also the "innate nature" (xing) of all people, a nature which Taoists see as being ultimately good. In a naturalistic sense, the Tao is a visible pattern, "the Tao that can be told", that is, the rhythmic processes and patterns of the natural world that can be observed and described. Thus, Kohn writes that Tao can be explained as twofold: the transcendent, ineffable, mysterious Tao and the natural, visible, and tangible Tao.

Tao is a process of reality itself, a way for things to gather together while still changing. All of these reflect the deep-rooted belief of the Chinese people that change is the most fundamental characteristic of things. In the Book of Changes, this pattern of change is symbolized by numbers representing 64 related force relationships, known as hexagrams. Tao is the change of these forces, usually referred to as yin and yang.

Throughout Taoist history, Taoists have developed different metaphysical views regarding the Tao. For example, while the Xuanxue thinker Wang Bi described Tao as wú (nothingness, negativity, not-being), Guo Xiang rejected wú as the source and held that instead the true source was spontaneous "self-production" and "self-transformation". The Chongxuan School developed a metaphysics influenced by Buddhist Madhyamaka philosophy.

=== De ===
The active expression of Tao is called De (德; dé; also spelled Te or Teh; often translated with virtue or power), in a sense that De results from an individual living and cultivating the Tao. The term De can be used to refer to ethical virtue in the conventional Confucian sense, as well as to a higher spontaneous kind of sagely virtue or power that comes from following the Tao and practicing wu wei. Thus, it is a natural expression of the Tao's power and not anything like conventional morality. Louis Komjathy describes De as the manifestation of one's connection to the Tao, which is a beneficial influence of one's cosmological attunement.

=== Ziran ===
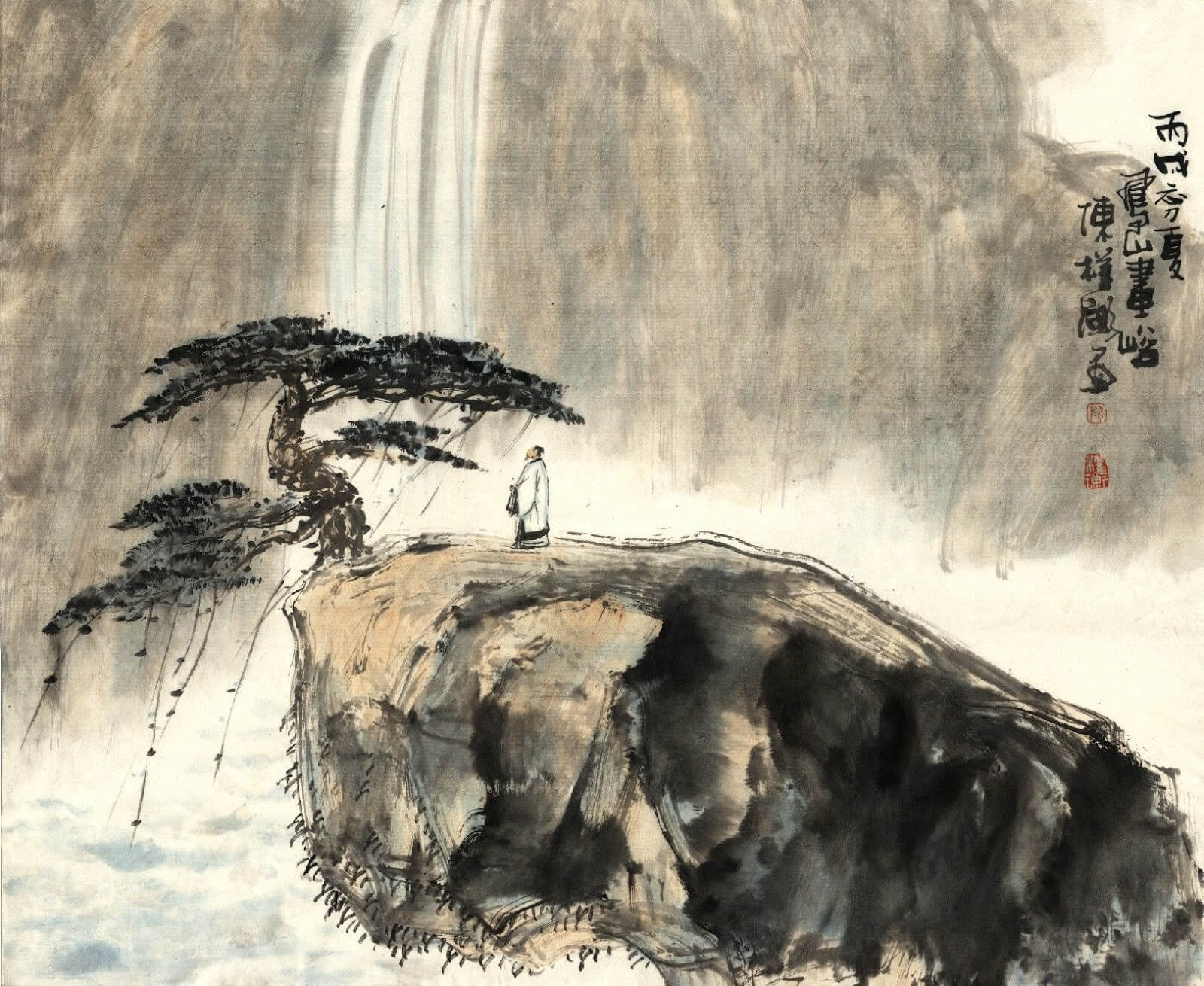
Zhuang Zhou in front of a waterfall. In Taoism, downward flow of water is a commonly used analogy for naturalness.

Ziran (自然; zìrán; tzu-jan; lit. "self-so", "self-organization") is regarded as a central concept and value in Taoism and as a way of flowing with the Tao. It describes the "primordial state" of all things as well as a basic character of the Tao, and is usually associated with naturalness and creativity. According to Kohn, in the Zhuangzi, ziran refers to the fact that "there is thus no ultimate cause to make things what they are. The universe exists by itself and of itself; it is existence just as it is. Nothing can be added or subtracted from it; it is entirely sufficient upon itself."

To attain naturalness, one has to identify with the Tao and flow with its natural rhythms as expressed in oneself. This involves freeing oneself from selfishness and desire and appreciating simplicity. It also consists of understanding one's nature and living in accordance with it without trying to be something one is not or overthinking one's experience. One way of cultivating ziran found in the Zhuangzi is to practice the "fasting of the mind", a kind of Taoist meditation in which one empties the mind. It is held that this can also activate qi (vital energy). In some passages found in the Zhuangzi and in the Tao Te Ching, naturalness is also associated with rejection of the state (anarchism) and a desire to return to simpler pre-technological times (primitivism).

An often cited metaphor for naturalness is pu (樸; pǔ, pú; p'u; 'uncut wood'), the "uncarved log", which represents the "original nature ... prior to the imprint of culture" of an individual. It is usually referred to as a state one may return to.

=== Wu wei ===
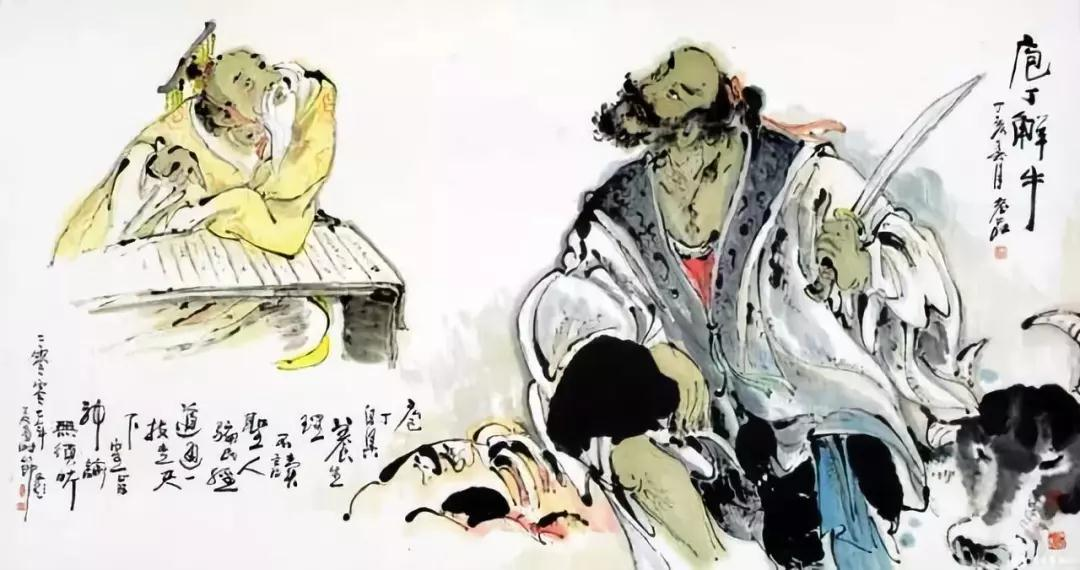
The parable from the Zhuangzi of the butcher Ding, portrayed as being so adept at cutting a carcass that he does not exert any force on the meat

Wu wei is a primary ethical concept in Taoism. Wei refers to any intentional or deliberated action, while wu carries the meaning of "there is no ..." or "lacking, without". Standard translations are non-action, effortless action, action without intent, non-interference, and non-intervention. The meaning is sometimes emphasized by using the paradoxical expression "wei wu wei": an action without action. Kohn writes that wu wei refers to "letting go of egoistic concerns" and "to abstain from forceful and interfering measures that cause tensions and disruption in favor of gentleness, adaptation, and ease."

In ancient Taoist texts, wu wei is associated with water through its yielding nature and the effortless way it flows around obstacles. Taoist philosophy, in accordance with the I Ching, proposes that the universe works harmoniously according to its own ways. When someone exerts their will against the world in a manner that is out of rhythm with the cycles of change, they may disrupt that harmony, and unintended consequences may more likely result rather than the willed outcome. Thus, the Tao Te Ching says: "act of things and you will ruin them. Grasp for things and you will lose them. Therefore the sage acts with inaction and has no ruin, lets go of grasping and has no loss."

Taoism does not identify one's will as the root problem. Instead, it asserts that one must place one's will in harmony with the natural way of the universe. Thus, a potentially harmful interference may be avoided, and in this way, goals can be achieved effortlessly. "By wu-wei, the sage seeks to come into harmony with the great Tao, which itself accomplishes by nonaction."

=== Aspects of self ===
The Taoist view of the self is holistic and rejects the idea of a separate individualized self. As Russell Kirkland writes, Taoists "generally assume that one's 'self' cannot be understood or fulfilled without reference to other persons, and to the broader set of realities in which all persons are naturally and properly embedded."

In Taoism, one's innate or fundamental nature (xing) is ultimately the Tao expressing or manifesting itself as an embodied person. Innate nature is connected with one's heart-mind (xin), which refers to consciousness, the heart, and one's spirit. The focus of Taoist psychology is the heart-mind (xin), the intellectual and emotional center (zhong) of a person. It is associated with the chest cavity and the physical heart, as well as with emotions, thoughts, consciousness, and the storehouse of spirit (shen). When the heart-mind is unstable and separated from the Tao, it is called the ordinary heart-mind (suxin). On the other hand, the original heart-mind (benxin) pervades Tao and is constant and peaceful.

The Neiye (ch.14) calls this pure original heart-mind the "inner heart-mind", "an awareness that precedes language", and "a lodging place of the numinous". Later Taoist sources also refer to it by other terms like "awakened nature" (wuxing), "original nature" (benxing), "original spirit" (yuanshen), and "scarlet palace". This pure heart-mind is seen as being characterized by clarity and stillness (qingjing), purity, pure yang, spiritual insight, and emptiness.

Taoists see life (sheng) as an expression of the Tao. The Tao is seen as granting each person a ming (life destiny), which is one's corporeal existence, one's body and vitality. Generally speaking, Taoist cultivation seeks a holistic psychosomatic form of training that is described as "dual cultivation of innate nature and life-destiny" (xingming shuanxiu). Taoism believes in a "pervasive spirit world that is both interlocked with and separate from the world of humans."

The cultivation of innate nature is often associated with the practice of stillness (jinggong) or quiet meditation, while the cultivation of life-destiny generally revolves around movement-based practices (dongong) like daoyin and health and longevity practices (yangsheng).

=== The Taoist body ===
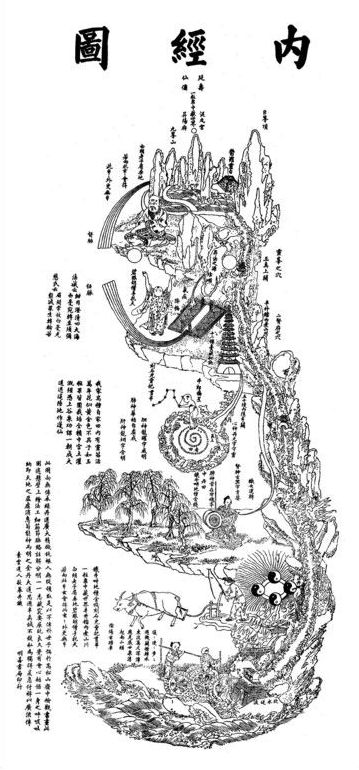
The Neijing Tu, a diagram which illustrates the complex Taoist schema of the body as a way to aid practitioners of inner cultivation

Many Taoist practices work with ancient Chinese understandings of the body, its organs and parts, "elixir fields" (dantien), inner substances (such as "essence" or jing), animating forces (like the hun and po), and meridians (qi channels). The complex Taoist schema of the body and its subtle body components contains many parallels with Traditional Chinese medicine and is used for health practices as well as for somatic and spiritual transformation (through neidan – "psychosomatic transmutation" or "internal alchemy"). Taoist physical cultivation rely on purifying and transforming the body's qi (vital breath, energy) in various ways such as dieting and meditation.

According to Livia Kohn, qi is "the cosmic energy that pervades all. The concrete aspect of Tao, qi is the material force of the universe, the basic stuff of nature." According to the Zhuangzi, "human life is the accumulation of qi; death is its dispersal." Everyone has some amount of qi and can gain and lose qi in various ways. Therefore, Taoists hold that through various qi cultivation methods they can harmonize their qi, and thus improve health and longevity, and even attain magic powers, social harmony, and immortality. The Neiye is one of the earliest texts that teach qi cultivation methods.

Qi is one of the Three Treasures, which is a specifically Taoist schema of the main elements in Taoist physical practices like qigong and neidan. The three are: jing (essence, the foundation for one's vitality), qi and shén (神, spirit, subtle consciousness, a capacity to connect with the subtle spiritual reality). These three are further associated with the three "elixir fields" (dantian) and the organs in different ways.

The body in Taoist political philosophy was important and their differing views on it and humanity's place in the universe were a point of distinction from Confucian politicians, writers, and political commentators. Some Taoists viewed ancestors as merely corpses that were improperly revered and respect for the dead as irrelevant and others within groups that followed these beliefs viewed almost all traditions as worthless.

=== Ethics ===
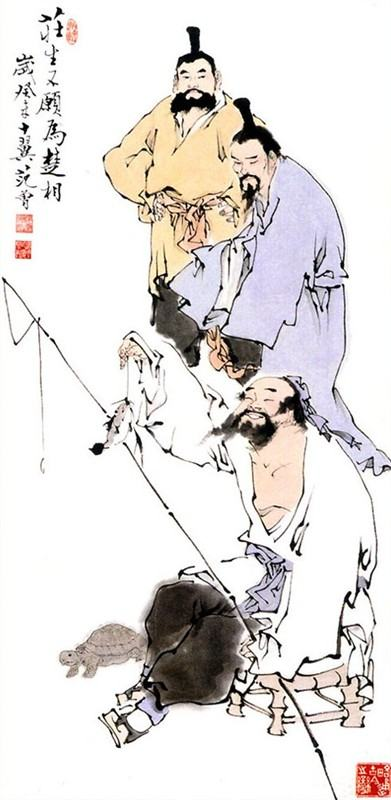
The tortoise in the mud parable from the Zhuangzi. When some officials came to offer Zhuang Zhou a job at court, he replied he preferred to continue to live a life of solitary simplicity, like a turtle who prefers to live in the mud rather than to be displayed at court.

Taoist ethics tends to emphasize various themes from the Taoist classics, such as naturalness (pu), spontaneity (ziran), simplicity, detachment from desires, and most important of all, wu wei. The classic Taoist view is that humans are originally and naturally aligned with Tao; thus, their original nature is inherently good. It emphasizes doing things that are natural, following the Tao, which is a cosmic force that flows through all things and binds and releases them. However, one can fall away from this due to personal habits, desires, and social conditions. Returning to one's nature requires active attunement through Taoist practice and ethical cultivation.

Some popular Taoist beliefs, such as the early Shangqing School, do not believe this and believe that some people are irredeemably evil and destined to be so. Many Taoist movements from around the time Buddhist elements started being syncretized with Taoism had a highly negative view of foreigners, referring to them as yi or "barbarians", and some of these thought of foreigners as people who do not feel "human feelings" and who never live out the correct norms of conduct until they became Taoist. At this time, China was widely viewed by Taoists as a holy land because of influence from the Chinese public that viewed being born in China as a privilege and that outsiders were enemies. Preserving a sense of "Chineseness" in the country and rewarding nativist policies such as the building of the Great Wall of China was important to many Taoist groups.

Foreigners who joined these Taoist sects were made to repent for their sins in another life that caused them to be born "in the frontier wilds" because of Buddhist ideas of reincarnation coming into their doctrines. Some Taoist movements viewed human nature neutrally. However, some of the movements that were dour or skeptical about human nature did not believe that evil is permanent and believed that evil people can become good. Korean Taoists tended to think extremely positively of human nature.

Some of the most important virtues in Taoism are the Three Treasures or Three Jewels (三寶; sānbǎo). These are: ci (慈; cí, usually translated as compassion), jian (儉; jiǎn, usually translated as moderation), and bugan wei tianxia xian (不敢爲天下先; bùgǎn wéi tiānxià xiān; 'not daring to act as first under the heavens', but usually translated as humility). Arthur Waley, applying them to the socio-political sphere, translated them as: "abstention from aggressive war and capital punishment", "absolute simplicity of living", and "refusal to assert active authority".

Taoism also adopted the Buddhist doctrines of karma and reincarnation into its religious ethical system. Medieval Taoist thought developed the idea that ethics was overseen by a celestial administration that kept records of people's actions and their fate, as well as handed out rewards and punishments through particular celestial administrators.

In its original form, the religion does not involve political affairs or complex rituals; on the contrary, it encourages the avoidance of public responsibility and the search for a vision of a spiritual, transcendent world.

=== Soteriology and religious goals ===
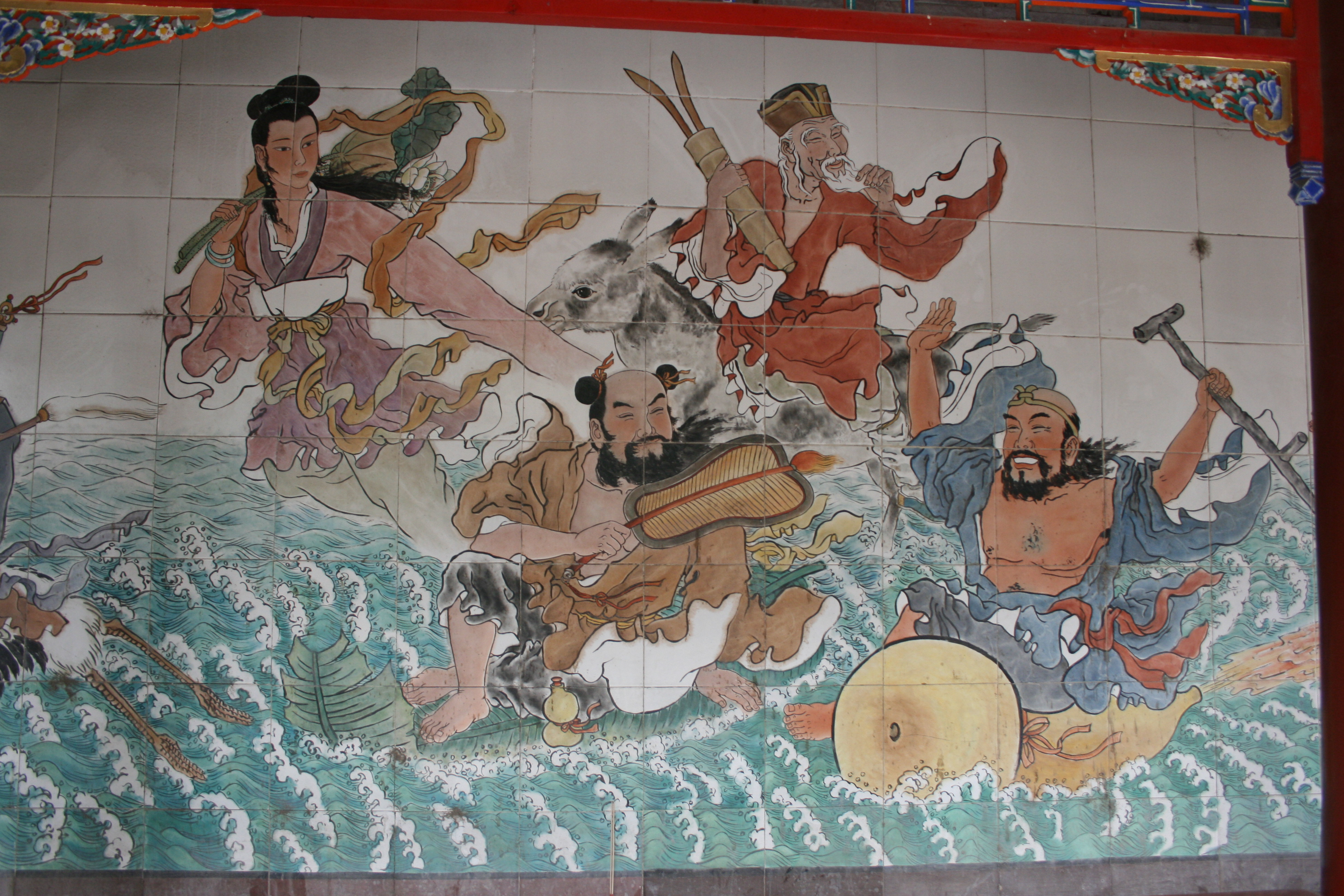
Taoist immortals at the White Cloud Temple

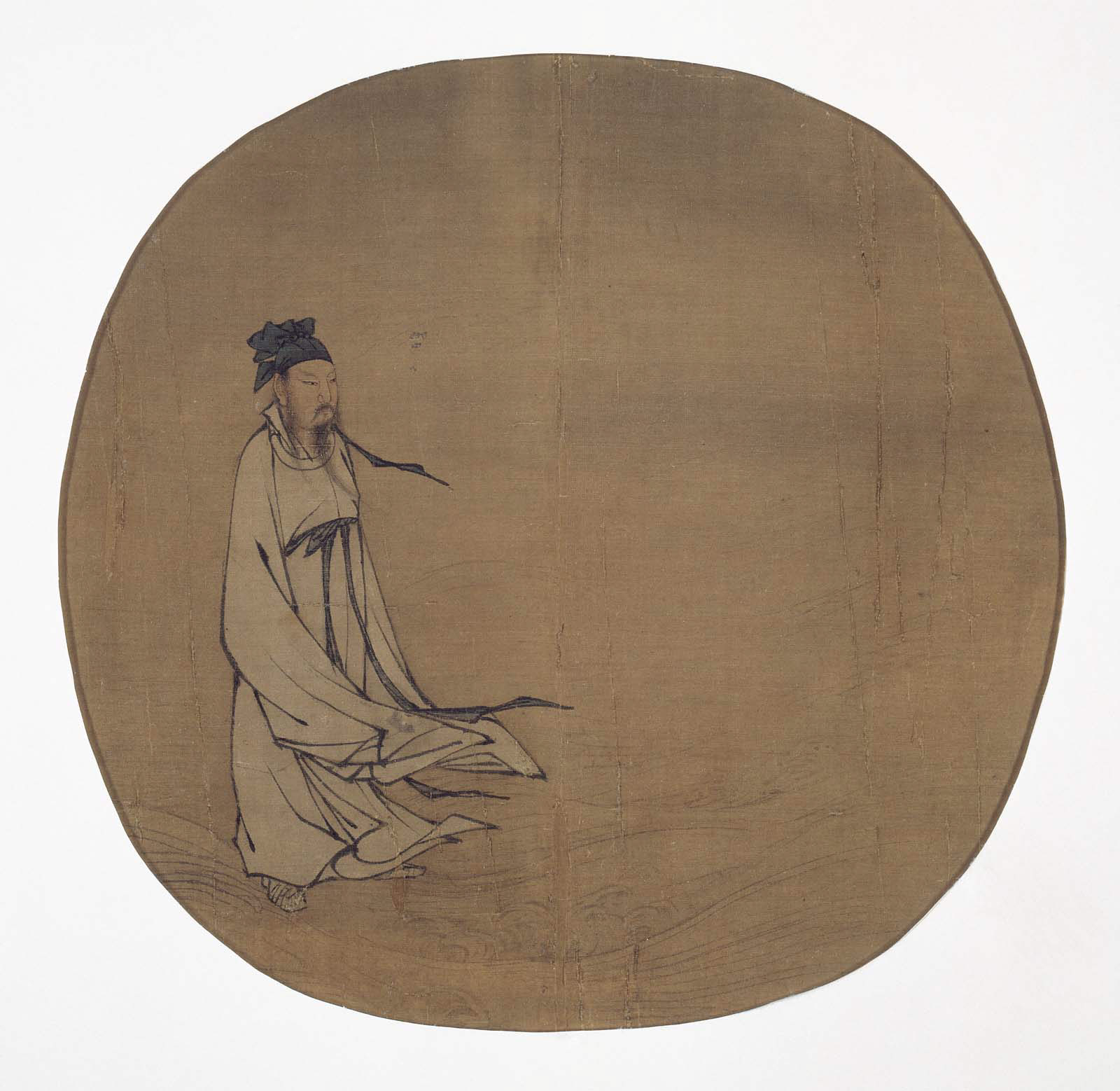
The Taoist immortal Lü Dongbin crossing Lake Dongting, dated to the Song dynasty

Taoists have different religious goals that include Taoist conceptions of sagehood (zhenren), spiritual self-cultivation, a happy afterlife or longevity and some form of immortality (xian, variously understood as a kind of transcendent post-mortem state of the spirit).

Taoists' views about what happens in the afterlife tend to include the soul becoming a part of the cosmos (which was often thought of as an illusionary place where qi and physical matter were thought of as being the same in a way held together by the microcosm of the spirits of the human body and the macrocosm of the universe itself, represented and embodied by the Three Pure Ones), somehow aiding the spiritual functions of nature or Tian after death or being saved by either achieving spiritual immortality in an afterlife or becoming a xian who can appear in the human world at will, but normally lives in another plane. "[S]acred forests and[/or] mountains" or a yin-yang, yin, yang, or Tao realm inconceivable and incomprehensible by normal humans and even the virtuous Confucius and Confucianists, such as the mental realm sometimes called "the Heavens" where higher, spiritual versions of Taoists such as Laozi were thought to exist when they were alive and absorb "the purest Yin and Yang" were all possibilities for a potential xian to be reborn in. These spiritual versions were thought to be abstract beings that can manifest in that world as mythical beings such as xian dragons who eat yin and yang energy and ride clouds and their qi.

More specifically, possibilities for "the spirit of the body" include "join[ing] the universe after death", exploring or serving various functions in parts of tiān or other spiritual worlds, or becoming a xian who can do one or more of those things.

Taoist xian are often seen as being eternally young because "of their life being totally at one with the Tao of nature." They are also often seen as being made up of "pure breath and light" and as being able to shapeshift, and some Taoists believed their afterlife natural "paradises" were palaces of heaven.

Taoists who sought to become one of the many different types of immortals, such as xian or zhenren, wanted to "ensure complete physical and spiritual immortality".

In the Quanzhen school of Wang Chongyang, the goal is to become a sage, which he equates with being a "spiritual immortal" (shen xien) and with the attainment of "clarity and stillness" (qingjing) through the integration of "inner nature" (xing) and "worldly reality" (ming).

Those who know the Tao, who flow with the natural way of the Tao and thus embody the patterns of the Tao, are called sages or "perfected persons" (zhenren). This is what is often considered salvation in Taoist soteriology. They often are depicted as living simple lives, as craftsmen or hermits. In other cases, they are depicted as the ideal rulers who practice ruling through non-intervention and under whom nations prosper peacefully. Sages are the highest humans, mediators between heaven and earth, and the best guides on the Taoist path. They act naturally and simply, with a pure mind and with wuwei. They may have supernatural powers and bring good fortune and peace.

Some sages are also considered to have become one of the xian through their mastery of the Tao. After shedding their mortal form, spiritual immortals may have many superhuman abilities like flight and are often said to live in heavenly realms.

The sages are thus because they have attained the primary goal of Taoism: a union with the Tao and harmonization or alignment with its patterns and flows. This experience is one of being attuned to the Tao and to our own original nature, which already has a natural capacity for resonance (ganying) with Tao. This is the main goal that all Taoist practices are aiming towards and can be felt in various ways, such as a sense of psychosomatic vitality and aliveness, as well as stillness and a "true joy" (zhenle) or "celestial joy" that remains unaffected by mundane concerns like gain and loss.

The Taoist quest for immortality was inspired by Confucian emphasis on filial piety and how worshipped ancestors were thought to exist after death.

Becoming an immortal through the power of yin-yang and heaven, but also specifically Taoist interpretations of the Tao, was sometimes thought of as possible in Chinese folk religion, and Taoist thoughts on immortality were sometimes drawn from Confucian views on heaven and its status as an afterlife that permeates the mortal world as well.

=== Cosmology ===
Zhou Dunyi's (1017–1073 CE) cosmological taijitu diagram. The red circle is the formless Wuji which gives birth to "the two" – yin and yang (i.e. taiji).

Taoist cosmology is cyclic—the universe is seen as being in constant change, with various forces and energies (qi) affecting each other in different complex patterns. Taoist cosmology shares similar views with the School of Naturalists. Taoist cosmology focuses on the impersonal transformations (zaohua) of the universe, which are spontaneous and unguided.

Livia Kohn explains the basic Taoist cosmological theory as:

The root of creation Tao rested in deep chaos (ch. 42). Next, it evolved into the One, a concentrated state of cosmic unity that is full of creative potential and often described in I Ching terms as the taiji. The One then brought forth "the Two", the two energies yin and yang, which in turn merged in harmony to create the next level of existence, "the Three" (yin-yang combined), from which the myriad beings came forth. From original oneness, the world thus continued to move into ever greater states of distinction and differentiation.

The main distinction in Taoist cosmology is that between yin and yang, which applies to various sets of complementary ideas: bright – dark, light – heavy, soft – hard, strong – weak, above – below, ruler – minister, male – female, and so on. Cosmically, these two forces exist in mutual harmony and interdependence. Yin and yang are further divided into five phases (Wuxing, or five materials): minor yang, major yang, yin/yang, minor yin, major yin. Each correlates with a specific substance: wood, fire, earth, metal, and water, respectively. This schema is used in many different ways in Taoist thought and practice, from nourishing life (yangsheng) and medicine to astrology and divination.

Taoists also generally see all things as being animated and constituted by qi (vital air, subtle breath), which is seen as a force that circulates throughout the universe and throughout human bodies (as both air in the lungs and as a subtle breath throughout the body's meridians and organs). Qi is in constant transformation between its condensed state (life) and diluted state (potential). These two different states of qi are embodiments of yin and yang, two complementary forces that constantly play against and with each other and where one cannot exist without the other.

Taoist texts present various creation stories and cosmogonies. Classic cosmogonies are nontheistic, presenting a natural undirected process in which an apophatic undifferentiated potentiality (wuwuji 'without non-differentiation') naturally unfolds into wuji (primordial oneness, "non-differentiation"), which then evolves into yin-yang (taiji) and then into the myriad beings, as in the Tao Te Ching. Later medieval models included the idea of a creator God (mainly seen as Lord Lao), representing order and creativity. Taoist cosmology influences Taoist soteriology, which holds that one can "return to the root" (guigen) of the universe (and of ourselves), which is also the Tao—the impersonal source (yuan) of all things. Taoist cosmology also incorporates concepts from Chinese astrology.

In Taoism, human beings are seen as a microcosm of the universe, and thus the cosmological forces, like the five phases, are also present in the form of the zangfu organs. Another common belief is that there are various gods that reside in human bodies. As a consequence, it is believed that a deeper understanding of the universe can be achieved by understanding oneself.

=== Theology and Taoist Deities ===
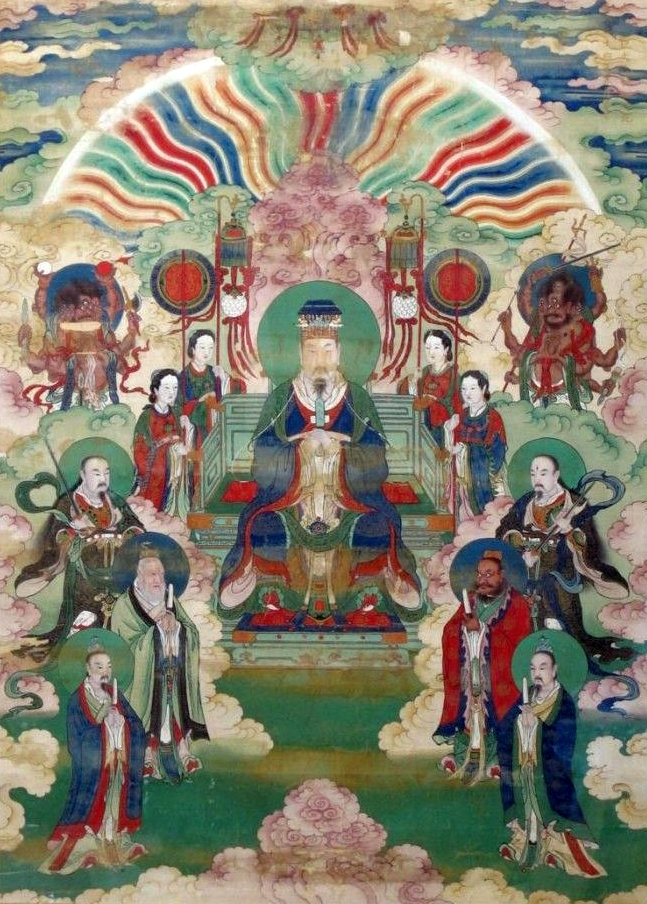
The Jade Emperor and the Four Heavenly Kings

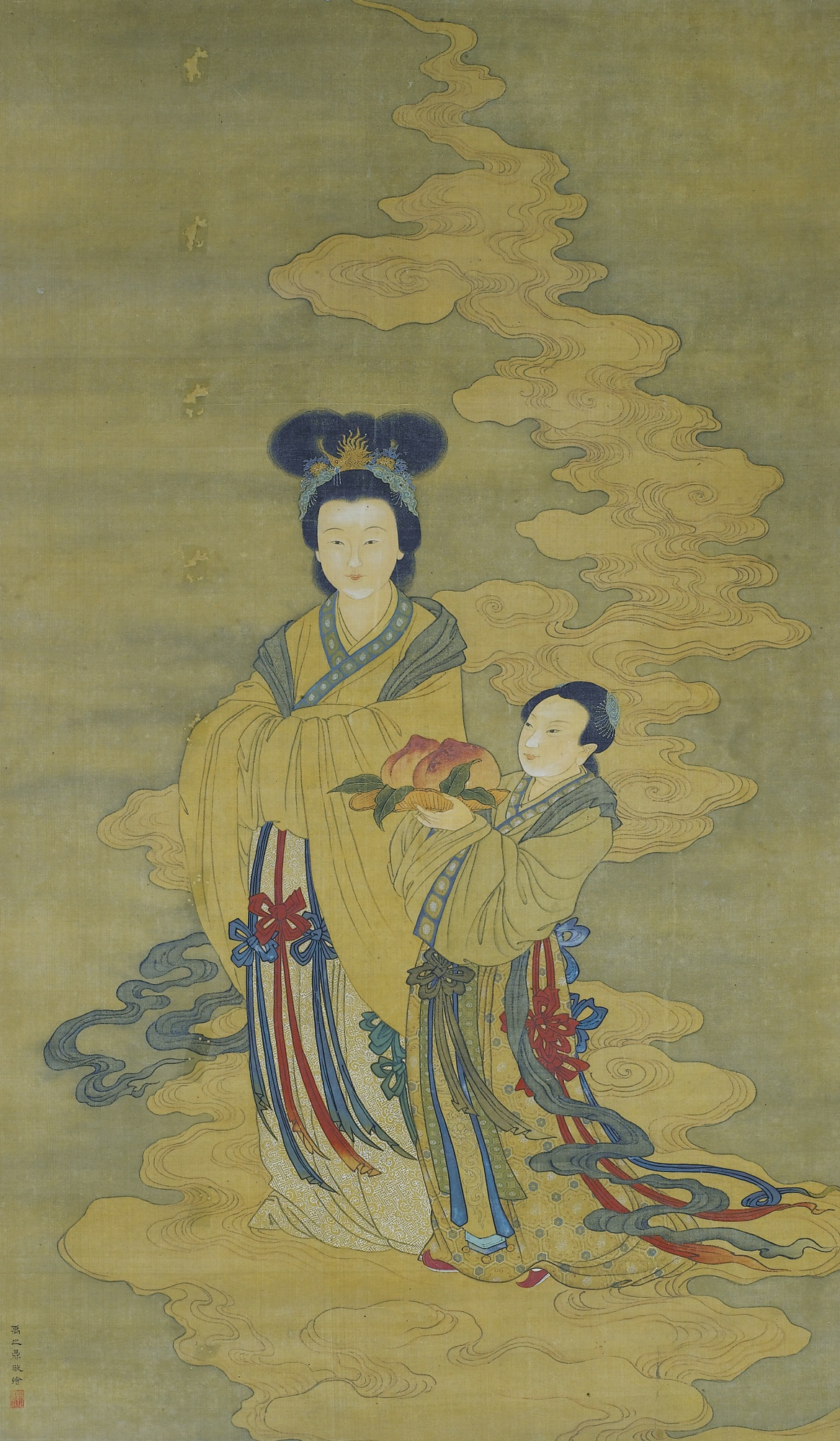
The Queen Mother of the West

Taoist theology can be defined as apophatic, given its philosophical emphasis on the formlessness and unknowable nature of the Tao and the primacy of the "Way" rather than anthropomorphic concepts of God. Nearly all the sects share this core belief. As mentioned above, the primary theology of Taoism involves the Dao as ultimate unity, as cosmic process, and as immanent-yet-exceeding the manifested world. In this sense, arguments for a monotheistic Taoism exist.

Nevertheless, on a secondary level of theology, Taoism features a vast pantheon of deities and spirits from Chinese mythology, associated with both living and non-living things, making it animistic and polytheistic. These deities are seen as emanations from an impersonal ultimate principle. In other words, deities are simply differentiated aspects of the Dao - some may be "higher" on some level, but all are manifestations of the Dao.

In Taoism (and more broadly in Chinese religion), unseen beings are often classified into shen (神, "gods/spirits"), zong (祖/祖先, "ancestors"), and gui (鬼, "ghosts"). Gods are recognized divine beings, ancestors are the ritually integrated dead of one's specific lineage, and ghosts are "disenfranchised" spirits (such as orphans or widows, or those who die unexpectedly). Some Taoist texts also discuss demons (mo 魔), a term used to refer to disorientated spirits or "unresolved qi-patterns".

In addition, Taoist religious traditions emphasize the ability for human beings to achieved transformed states, referred to as xian (仙, "Immortals") or zhenren (真人, “Perfected/Realized persons”). In some contexts, "immortals" can be read as literal immortality, whereas in other contexts it refers to a more general spiritual transcendence. This is seen as the pinnacle of disciplined self-cultivation, although the exact paths vary by tradition (e.g. ethical discipline, meditation, qi practices, ritual work, internal alchemy, etc.) Some figures are widely known in Chinese popular religion (e.g., the Eight Immortals), while others represent highly important figures in the history of Taoism (such as Zhang Daoling, Wei Huacun, Lu Xiujing, Wang Chongyang, and Lü Dongbin).

==== Taoist Deities ====
There is no fixed "Taoist pantheon", as Taoism is very inclusive with regards to incorporating local gods and immortals. Furthermore, different sects and regions emphasize different figures. However, Komjathy presents a simplified modern Taoist pantheon as follows:

At the ultimate level is the Dao (道), the uncreated source and ongoing process through which all things arise and transform. All Taoist deities are seen as expressions or emanations of the Dao.

Next, the Three Pure Ones are generally treated as the highest "manifestations" of the Dao: Yuanshi Tianzun ("Original and Primordial Heavenly Lord"), Lingbao Tianzun ("Divine Treasures Heavenly Lord"), and Daode Tianzun ("Heavenly Lord of Way and Virtue"). In many contexts, Daode Tianzun is seen as the deified form of Laozi, which ties this third “Pure One” to the Tao Te Ching and to Laozi's role as revealer/teacher.

Underneath the Three Pure Ones, the next ruling power is the Jade Emperor (Yuhuang Dadi, 玉皇大帝). If the Three Pure Ones are like supreme “principles,” the Jade Emperor is the administrator of the cosmos. He functions as the sovereign ruler of heaven who administers the cosmos through a vast celestial bureaucracy modeled on the imperial court of ancient China. He is assisted by the Four Heavenly Ministers (四御) (sometimes extended to six in later traditions), high-ranking “deputy” sovereigns who oversee major cosmic domains.

Next, there exists a series of high-profile divine figures, serving as cosmic "department heads" with large jurisdictions. These include:

- The Three Great Emperor-Officials: These consist of the ""Heavenly Official" (responsible for granting blessings), the "Earthly Official" (granting pardon and forgiveness), and the "Water Official" (granting relief from calamities and disasters).
- The five Wufang Shangdi: These are sovereigns of the fivefold cosmos, each one corresponding to one of the Five Phases: Wood, Fire, Earth, Metal, and Water.
- Xuanwu/Zhenwu (玄武): A major martial protector, strongly linked to exorcism, northern power, and the policing/protection side of the cosmos.
- Bixia Yuanjun (碧霞元君): The Goddess of childbirth and destiny, associated with Mount Tai and widely venerated for protection (especially for childbirth and family welfare).
- Doumu (斗母): The “Dipper Mother,” associated with the Big Dipper and serving as a protective deity invoked in rituals for health, protection against misfortune, and spiritual cultivation
- Queen Mother of the West (Xiwangmu 西王母): A supreme mother goddess associated with immortality (Kunlun, peaches, paradise motifs), often seen in longevity/immortal imagery.

Next, there are deities who serve as "specialist services", or deities commonly invoked for more narrow functional roles. Lesser deities may be promoted or demoted for their activity. Examples of these include:

- Taiyi Jiuku Tianzun (太乙救苦天尊): A savior deity invoked to relieve suffering and is closely associated with salvation rites for the dead, including the rescue or deliverance of ghosts in Lingbao ritual contexts.
- Leigong (雷公): The God of thunder tied to punishment, exorcisms, and correcting the moral/cosmic order.
- Wenchang Wang (文昌): The God of culture and literature, worshiped by scholars and students for academic help.
- Yaowang (藥王): A “Medicine King” deity, often associated with Tang dynasty physician Sun Simiao, invoked for healing, longevity, and health-related protection.
- Wang Lingguan (王靈官): Often viewed as a frontline enforcer or guardian, a high-powered martial figure often serving as the "protective muscle" of temples.

Finally, Taoism frequently integrated local tutelary deities associated with particular places, especially earth/land gods such as Tudigong (土地公, “Lord of the Land”), a locality guardian whose jurisdiction is limited to a specific area (such as a village, temple compound, neighborhood block, or building).

Despite these hierarchies of deities, most conceptions of Tao should not be analogized with the Western sense of theism. "Being one with the Tao" does not necessarily indicate a union with a supreme deity, principle, or reality, as is believed achievable in, for example, forms of theistic Hinduism.

== Practices ==
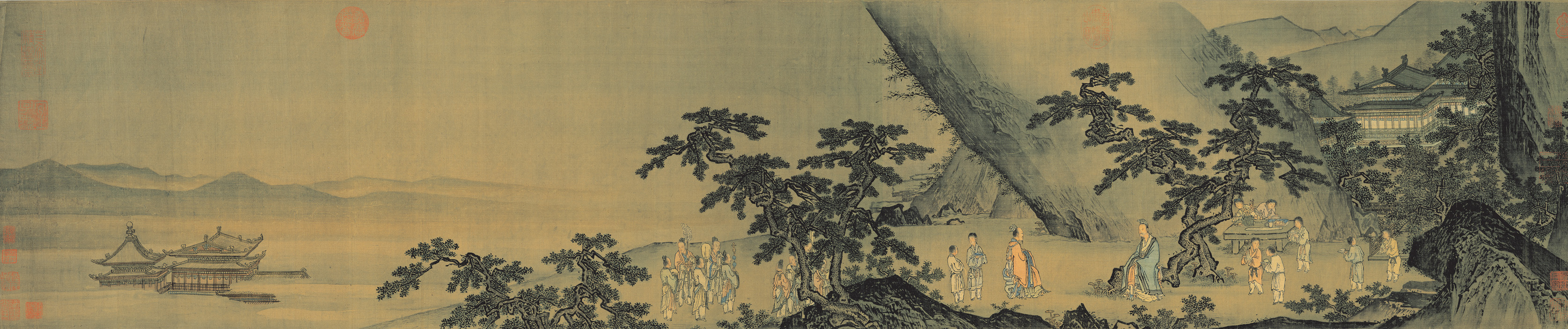
The Yellow Emperor Inquires of the Tao, National Palace Museum, Taipei, early Ming dynasty. This silk scroll painting is based on the story that the Yellow Emperor went out to the Kongtong Mountains to meet with the famous Taoist sage Guangchengzi

Key elements of Taoist practice include a commitment to self-cultivation, wu wei, and attunement to the patterns of the Tao.The practice of Taoism seeks to develop the body back to its original level of energy and restore it to its original state of creation. The body is no longer just a means of living in harmony in the world; it is itself a universe. Most Taoists throughout history have agreed on the importance of self cultivation through various practices, which were seen as ways to transform oneself and integrate oneself to the deepest realities.

Communal rituals are important in most Taoist traditions, as are methods of self-cultivation. Taoist self-cultivation practices tend to focus on the transformation of the heart-mind together with bodily substances and energies (like jing and qi) and their connection to natural and universal forces, patterns, and powers.

Despite the detachment from reality and dissent from Confucian humanism that the Tao Te Ching teaches, Taoists were and are generally not misanthropes or nihilists and see humans as an important class of things in the world. However, in most Taoist views humans were not held to be especially important in comparison to other aspects of the world and Taoist metaphysics that were seen as equally or more special. Similarly, some Taoists had similar views on their gods or the gods of other religions.

According to Louis Komjathy, Taoist practice is a complex subject that includes "aesthetics, art, dietetics, ethics, health and longevity practice, meditation, ritual, seasonal attunement, scripture study, and so forth."

Throughout the history of Taoism, mountains have occupied a special place for Taoist practice. They are seen as sacred spaces and as the ideal places for Taoist cultivation and Taoist monastic or eremitic life, which may include "cloud wandering" (yunyou) in the mountains and dwelling in mountain hermitages or grottoes.

Tao can serve as a life energy instead of qi in some Taoist belief systems.

=== The Nine Practices ===
One of the earliest schemas for Taoist practice was the "nine practices" or "nine virtues" (jiǔxíng 九行), which were taught in the Celestial Masters school. These were drawn from classical sources, mainly the Tao Te Ching, and are presented in the Laojun jinglu (Scriptural Statutes of Lord Lao; DZ 786).

The nine practices are:

1. Nonaction (wu wei 無為): Acting in a way that does not force outcomes, responding to situations with minimal contrivance so things unfold in accordance with the Dao.
2. Softness and weakness (róuruò 柔弱): Valuing flexibility, humility, and yielding strength, on the model of water, which overcomes hardness by not resisting it head-on.
3. Guarding the feminine (shǒucí 守雌): “Holding to the receptive” by maintaining a quiet, nurturing, non-dominating posture that preserves inner vitality and avoids aggressive display.
4. Being nameless (wúmíng 無名): Not fixating on labels, status, or reputations, and returning to the prior-to-concepts simplicity from which distinctions arise.
5. Clarity and stillness (qīngjìng 清靜): Cultivating mental and energetic quiet so perception becomes clear and one can align with the natural order without agitation.
6. Being adept (zhūshàn 諸善): Developing broad skill in “the goods” (virtues/beneficial actions), so one's conduct is reliably helpful, timely, and appropriate.
7. Being desireless (wúyù 無欲): Reducing grasping and craving that distort judgment, so action is guided by what is fitting rather than what the ego wants.
8. Knowing how to stop and be content (zhī zhǐzú 知止足): Recognizing sufficiency (setting limits and resting satisfied) so ambition doesn't become compulsive and destructive.
9. Yielding and withdrawing (tuīràng 推讓): Stepping back, giving way, and letting others take precedence when appropriate, reducing conflict and maintaining harmony.

=== Rituals ===
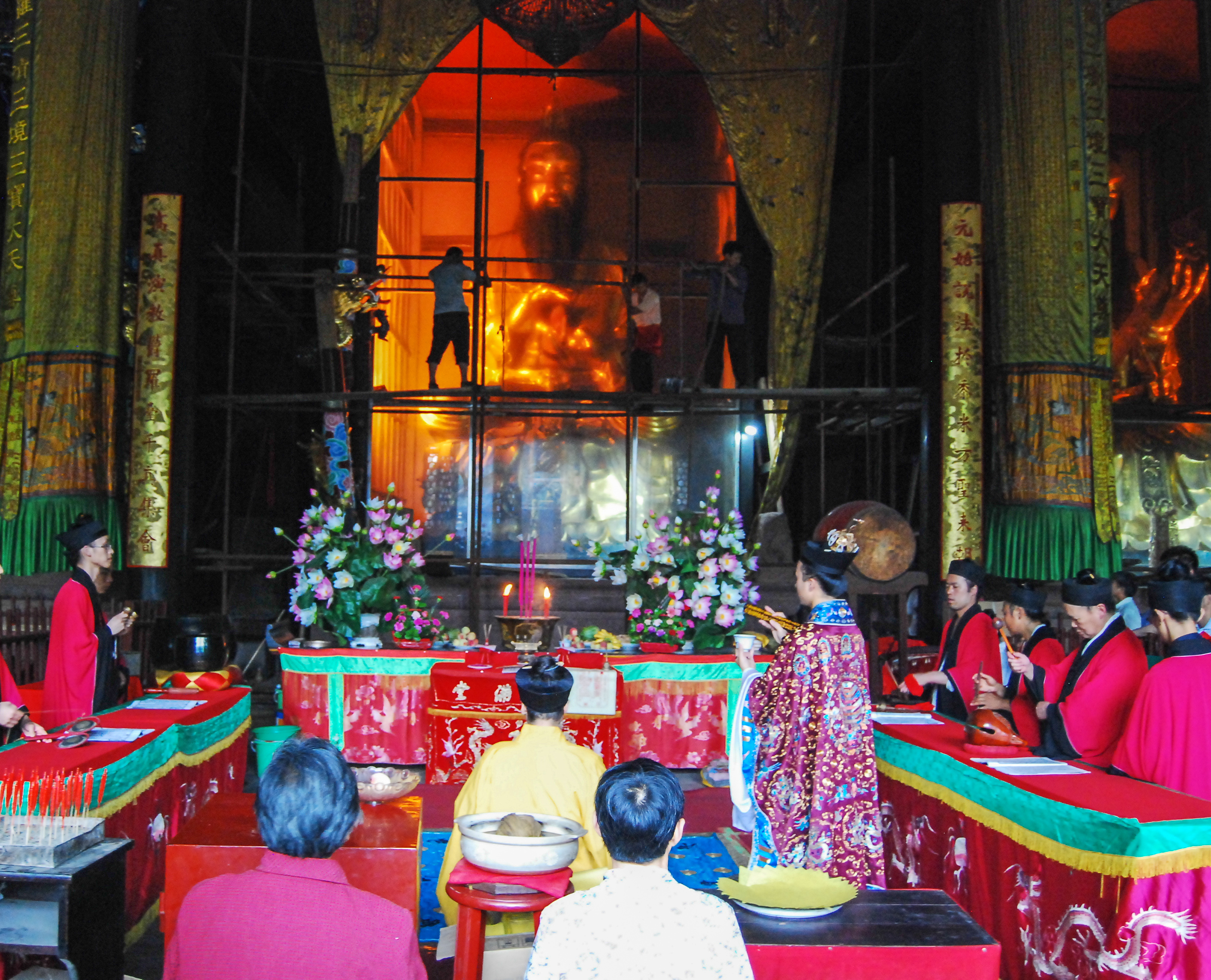
A Taoist ritual at the Gray Goat Temple (Qingyang Gong, 青羊宫) in Chengdu, Sichuan

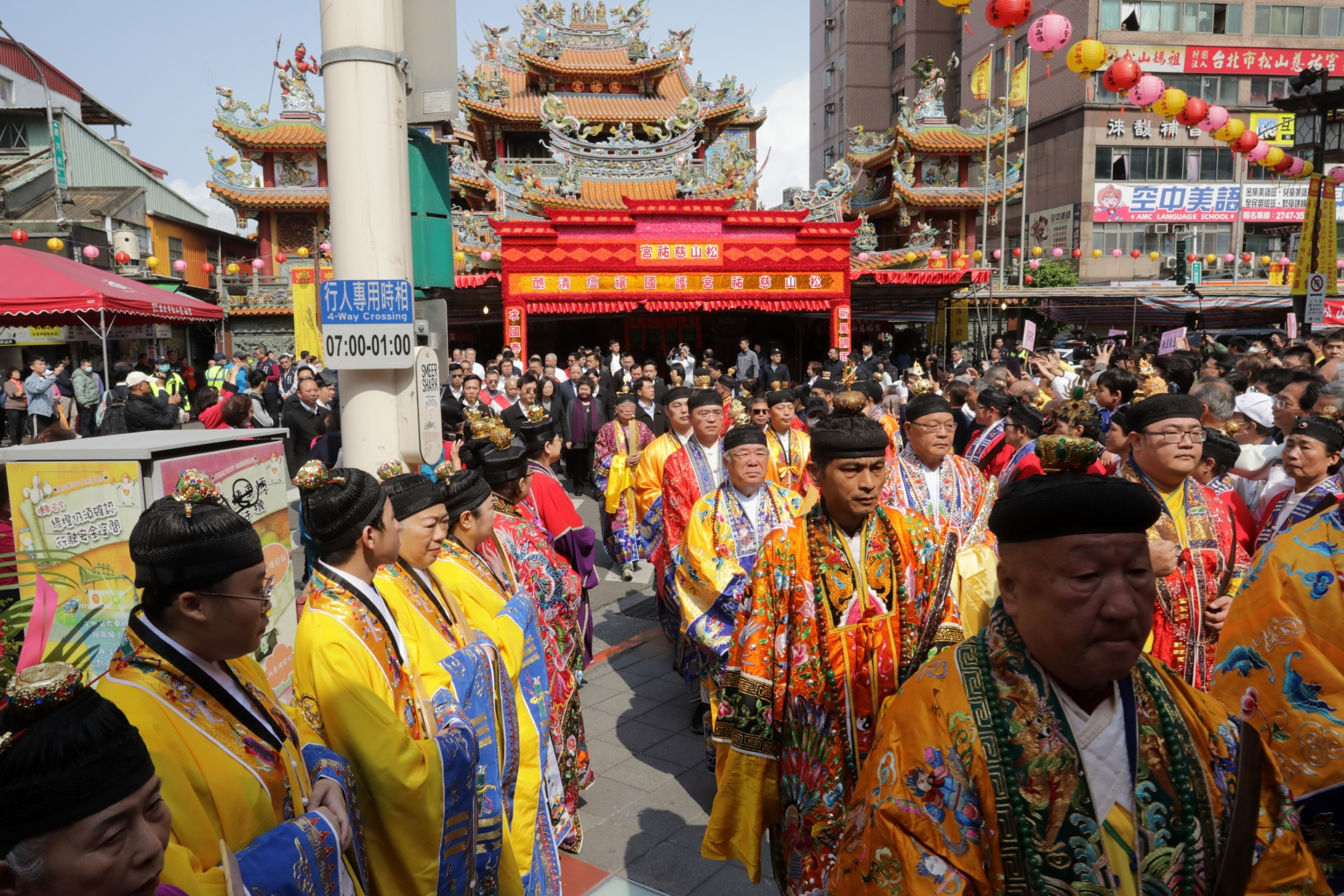
Taoist ritual specialists in a procession, Taiwan

Taoist ritual practice includes a wide range of activities, such as making offerings; reciting and reading scriptures; chanting and incantations; purification, confession, and repentance rites; submitting petitions and memorials and issuing formal announcements to the deities; observing ethical precepts; delivering lectures; and holding communal feasts. Formal Taoist rituals usually includes or concludes with the statement jiji ru lüling, a phrase of commemoration used to send off the prayers and petitions and to ensure efficacious responsiveness.

Ancient Chinese religion relied heavily on offerings and sacrifices to deities and ancestors. The early traditions of Celestial Master are said to have rejected blood (animal) sacrifice to traditional gods in favor of petition-based rites and offerings. In contemporary Taoist practice, ritual offerings to deities—such as incense, food, and other presentations—remain central, while animal sacrifice is generally not part of orthodox Taoist liturgy.

On particular holidays, such as the Qingming Festival, street parades take place. These are lively affairs that involve firecrackers, the burning of hell money, and flower-covered floats broadcasting traditional music. They also variously include lion dances and dragon dances, human-occupied puppets (often of the "Seventh Lord" and "Eighth Lord"), gongfu, and palanquins carrying images of deities. The various participants are not considered performers but possessed by the gods and spirits in question.

Taoism has two main types of rituals: vernacular and classical. Vernacular rituals are more about the community and include things like healing, protection, and celebrations for farming. Local people often do these and mix Taoist beliefs with local traditions, like ancestor worship and seasonal festivals. On the other hand, classical rituals are more formal and are performed by trained priests in temples. They follow ancient texts and involve detailed ceremonies, offerings, and chants to connect with the Tao and the universe. Examples of classical rituals include the "Three Purities" ceremony, which honors important deities, and rituals for purification and meditation. Together, these rituals show different ways people practice Taoism, focusing on community and personal spirituality.

=== Ethical precepts ===
Taking up and living by sets of ethical precepts is another important practice in Taoism. By the Tang dynasty, Taoism had created a system of lay discipleship in which one took a set of Ten precepts (Taoism).

The Five precepts (Taoism) are identical to the Buddhist five precepts (which are to avoid: killing [both human and non-human animals], theft, sexual misconduct, lying, and intoxicants like alcohol.) The other five were a set of five injunctions:

(6) I will maintain harmony with my ancestors and family and never disregard my kin; (7) When I see someone do good, I will support him with joy and delight; (8) When I see someone unfortunate, I will support him with dignity to recover good fortune; (9) When someone comes to do me harm, I will not harbor thoughts of revenge; (10) As long as all beings have not attained the Dao, I will not expect to do so myself.

Apart from these common ethical precepts, Taoist traditions also have larger sets of precepts that are often reserved for ordained priests or monastics.

=== Divination and magic ===
A key part of many Taoist traditions is the practice of divination. There are many methods used by Chinese Taoists, including I Ching divination, Chinese astrological divination, feng shui (geomantic divination), and the interpretation of various omens.

Mediumship and exorcism are key elements of some Taoist traditions. These can include tongji mediumship and the practice of planchette writing or spirit writing.

=== Longevity practices ===
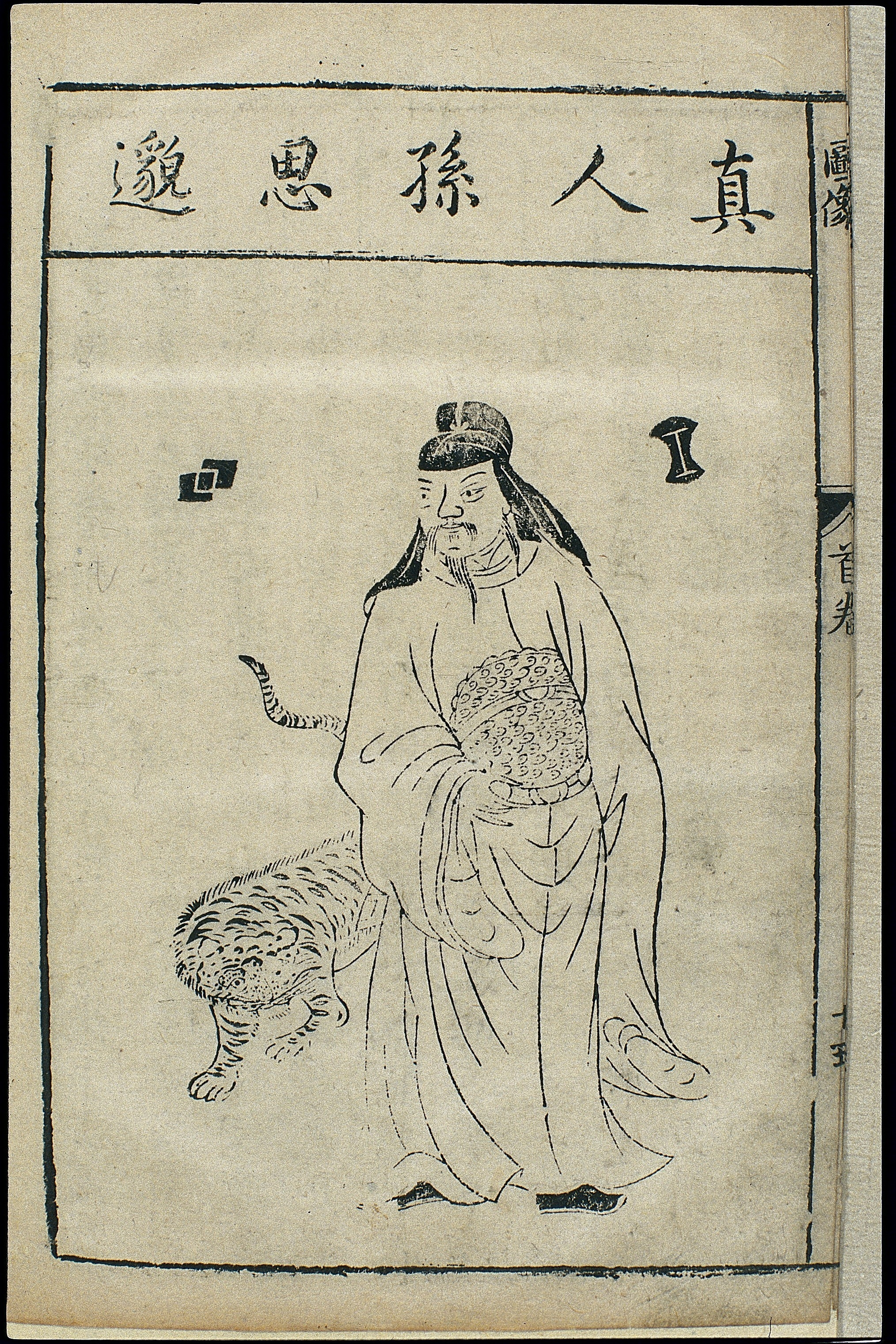
Sun Simiao as depicted by Gan Bozong, woodblock print, Tang dynasty (618–907)

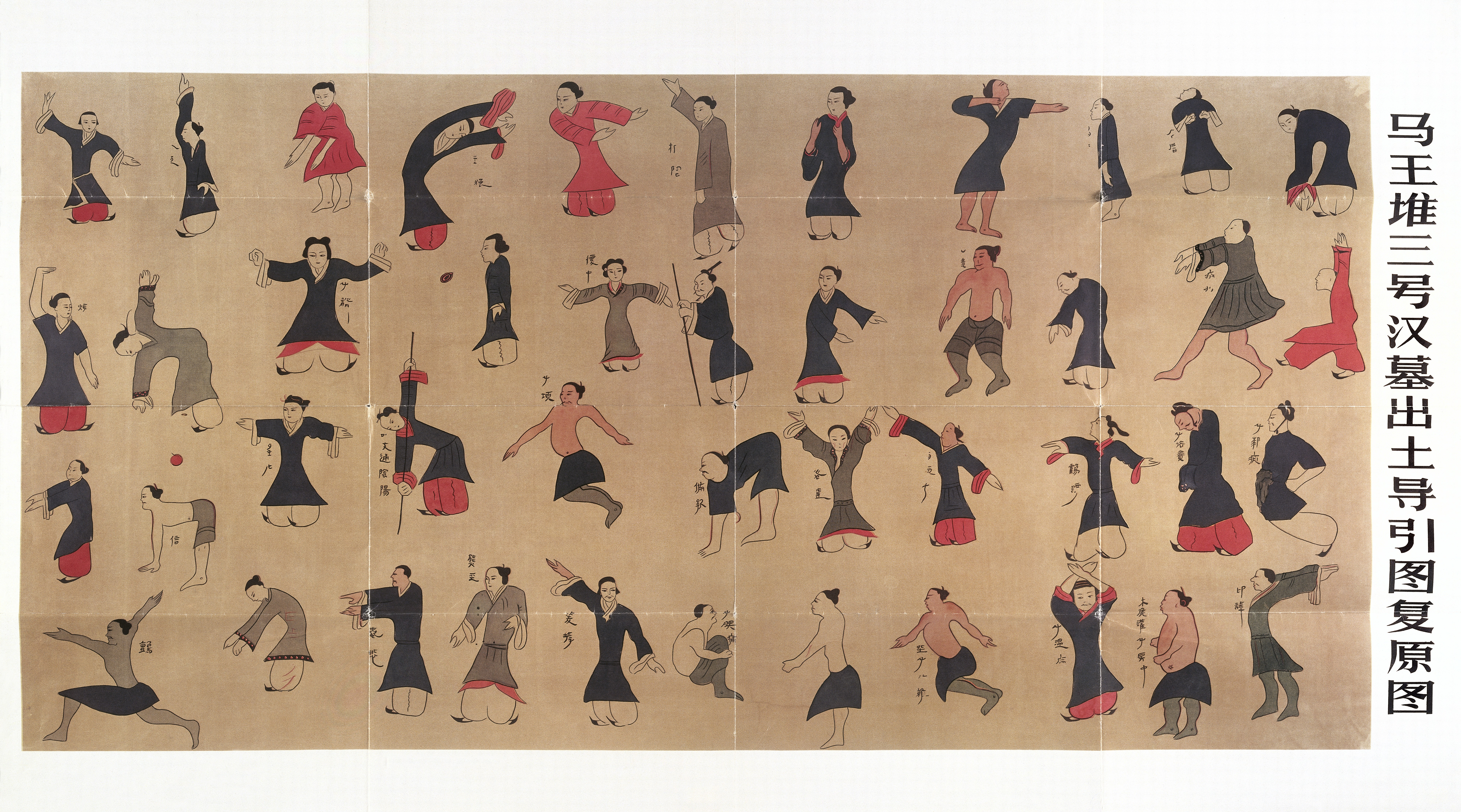
Reconstructed drawings of guiding and pulling (Daoyin) exercises from the Mawangdui Silk Texts.

Taoist longevity methods are closely related to ancient Chinese medicine. Many of these methods date back to Tang dynasty figures like alchemist Sun Simiao (582–683) and the Highest Clarity Patriarch Sima Chengzhen (647–735). The goal of these methods ranges from better health and longevity to immortality. Key elements of these "nourishing life" (yangsheng) methods include moderation in all things (drink, food, etc.), adapting to the cycles of the seasons by following injunctions regarding healing exercises (daoyin), and breathwork.

A number of physical practices, like modern forms of qigong, as well as modern internal martial arts (neijia) like Taijiquan, Baguazhang, Xingyiquan, and Liuhebafa, are practiced by Taoists as methods of cultivating health and longevity as well as eliciting internal alchemical transformations. However, these methods are not specifically Taoist and are often practiced outside of Taoist contexts.

Another key longevity method is "ingestion", which focuses on what one absorbs or consumes from one's environment and is seen as affecting what one becomes. Diatectics, closely influenced by Chinese medicine, is a key element of ingestion practice, and there are numerous Taoist diet regimens for different effects (such as ascetic diets, monastic diets, therapeutic diets, and alchemical diets that use herbs and minerals). One common practice is the avoidance of grains (bigu). In certain cases, practices like vegetarianism and true fasting are also adopted (which may also be termed bigu).

Some Taoists thought of the human body as a spiritual nexus with thousands of shen (often 36,000), gods who were likely thought of as at least somewhat mental in nature because of the word's other meaning of consciousness, that could be communed with by doing various methods to manipulate the yin and yang of the body, as well as its qi. These Taoists also thought of the human body as a metaphorical existence where three "cinnabar fields" that represented a higher level of reality or a spiritual kind of cinnabar that does not exist in normal reality. A method of meditation used by these Taoists was "visualizing light" that was thought to be qi or another kind of life energy, a Taoist substitute for qi, or believed in the existence of instead. The light was then channeled through the three cinnabar fields, forming a "microcosmic orbit" or through the hands and feet for a "macrocosmic orbit".

The 36,000 shen regulated the body and bodily functions through a bureaucratic system "modeled after the Chinese system of government". Death occurs only when these gods leave, but life can be extended by meditating while visualizing them, doing good deeds, and avoiding meat and wine.

=== Meditation ===
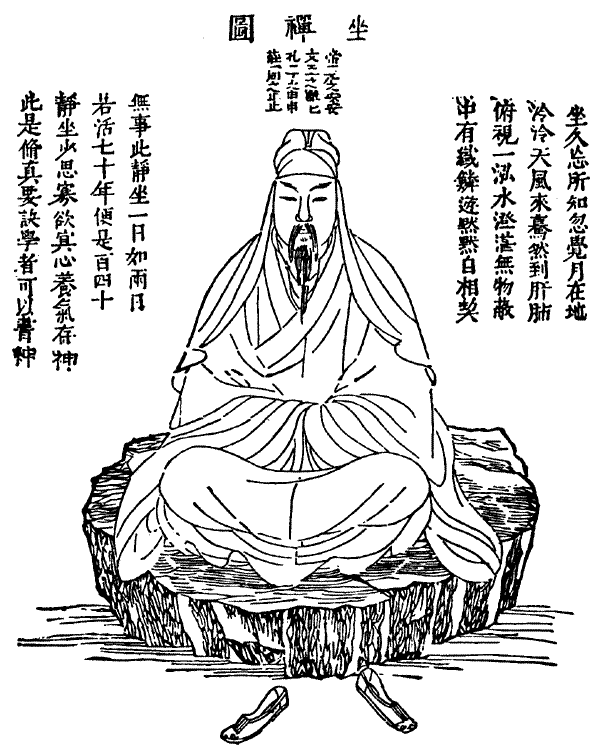
Taoist meditation

There are many methods of Taoist meditation (often referred to as "stillness practice", jinggong), some of which were strongly influenced by Buddhist methods.

Some of the key forms of Taoist meditation are:

- Apophatic or quietistic meditation, which was the main method of classical Taoism and can be found in classic texts like the Zhuangzi, where it is termed "fasting the heart-mind" (xinzhai). This practice is also variously termed "embracing the one" (baoyi), "guarding the one" (shouyi), "quiet sitting" (jingzuo), and "sitting forgetfulness" (zuowang). According to Louis Komjathy, this type of meditation "emphasizes emptiness and stillness; it is contentless, non-conceptual, and non-dualistic. One simply empties the heart-mind of all emotional and intellectual content." The texts of classical Taoism state that this meditation leads to the dissolution of the self and any sense of separate dualistic identity. Sima Chengzhen's Zuowang lun is a key text that outlines this method. The practice is also closely connected with the virtue of wu wei (inaction).
- Concentration meditation, focusing the mind on one theme, like the breath, a sound, a part of the body (like one of the dantiens), a diagram or mental image, a deity etc. A subset of this is called "guarding the one", which is interpreted in different ways.
- Observation (guan)—according to Livia Kohn, this method "encourages openness to all sorts of stimuli and leads to a sense of free-flowing awareness. It often begins with the recognition of physical sensations and subtle events in the body but may also involve paying attention to outside occurrences." Guan is associated with deep listening and energetic sensitivity. The term most often refers to "inner observation" (neiguan), a practice that developed through Buddhist influence (see: Vipaśyanā). Neiguan entails developing introspection of one's body and mind, which includes being aware of the various parts of the body as well as the various deities residing in the body.
- Zhan zhuang ("post standing")—standing meditation in various postures.
- Visualization (cunxiang) of various mental images, including deities, cosmic patterns, the lives of saints, various lights in the bodies organs, etc. This method is associated with the Supreme Clarity school, which first developed it.

=== Alchemy ===
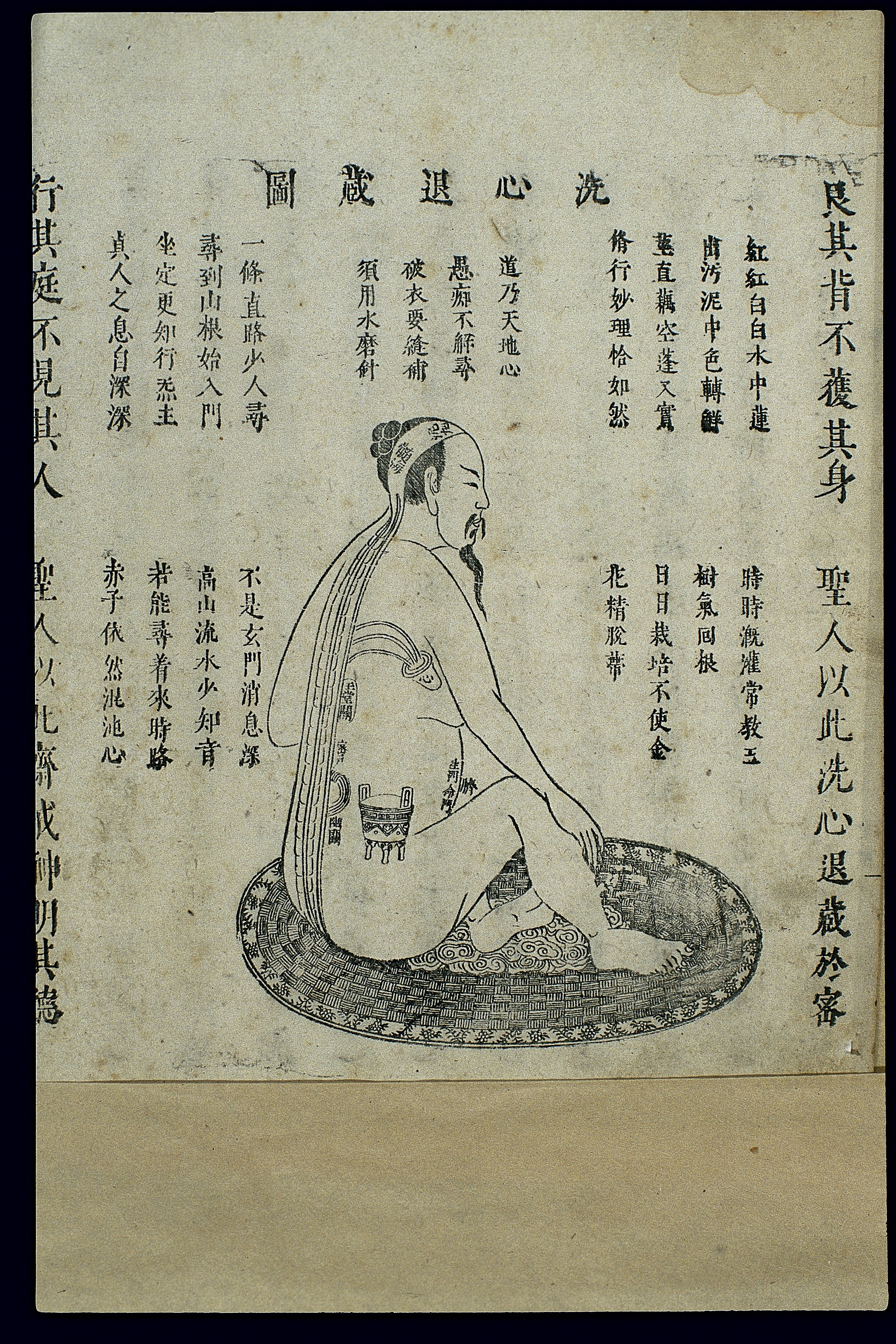
Illustration of Taoist neidan from the Xingming guizhi (Pointers on Spiritual Nature and Bodily Life), c. 1615 (Wanli era).

A key element of many schools of Taoism are alchemical practices, which include rituals, meditations, exercises, and the creation of various alchemical substances. The goals of alchemy include physical and spiritual transformation, aligning oneself spiritually with cosmic forces, undertaking ecstatic spiritual journeys, improving physical health, extending one's life, and even becoming an immortal (xian).

Taoist alchemy can be found in early Taoist scriptures like the Taiping Jing and the Baopuzi. There are two main kinds of alchemy, internal alchemy (neidan) and external alchemy (waidan). Internal alchemy (neidan, literally: "internal elixir"), which focuses on the transformation and increase of qi in the body, developed during the late imperial period (especially during the Tang) and is found in almost all Taoist schools today, though it is most closely associated with the Quanzhen School. There are many systems of internal alchemy with different methods such as visualization and breathwork. In the late Imperial period, neidan developed into complex systems that drew on numerous elements, including classic texts and meditations, yangsheng, I Ching symbology, Taoist cosmology, external alchemy concepts and terms, Chinese medicine, and Buddhist influences. Neidan systems tend to be passed on through oral master-disciple lineages that are often to be secret.

Livia Kohn writes that the main goal of internal alchemy is generally understood as a set of three transformations: "from essence (jing) to energy (qi), from energy to spirit (shen), and from spirit to Dao." Common methods for this include engaging the subtle body and activating the microcosmic orbit. Louis Komjathy adds that neidan seeks to create a transcendent spirit, usually called the "immortal embryo" (xiantai) or "yang spirit" (yangshen).

== Texts ==
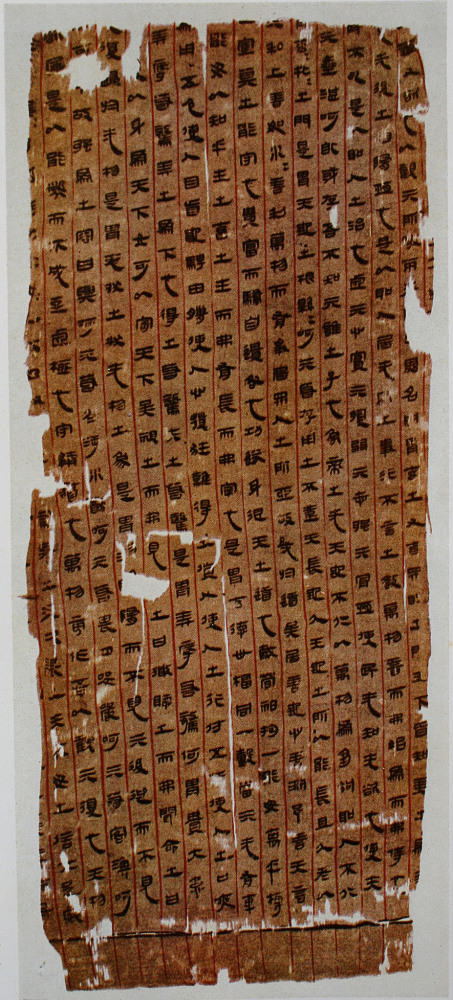
A part of a Taoist manuscript, ink on silk, 2nd century BCE, Han dynasty, unearthed from Mawangdui tomb no. 3

Some religious Taoist movements view traditional texts as scriptures that are considered sacred, authoritative, binding, and divinely inspired or revealed. However, the Tao Te Ching was originally viewed as "human wisdom" and "written by humans for humans." It and other important texts "acquired authority...that caused them to be regarded...as sacred." On the other hand, the Shangqing School has a tradition of approaching Taoism through scriptural study. It is believed that by reciting certain texts often enough one will be rewarded with immortality.

The most influential texts in Taoism are the Tao Te Ching and the Zhuangzi.

=== Tao Te Ching ===
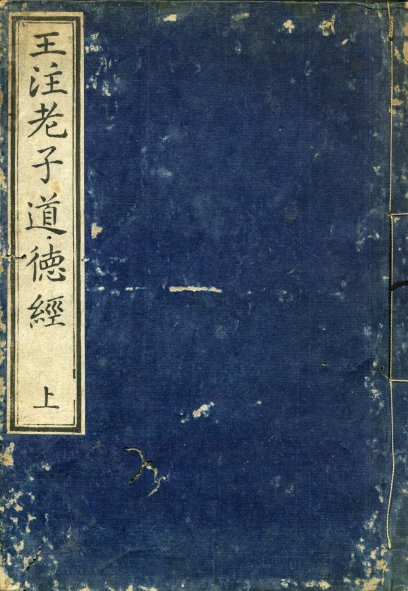
1770 Wang Bi edition of the Tao Te Ching

Throughout the history of Taoism, the Tao Te Ching has been a central text, used for ritual, self-cultivation, and philosophical purposes.

According to legend, the Tao Te Ching (also known as the Laozi) was written by Laozi. Authorship, precise date of origin, and even unity of the text are still subject of debate and will probably never be known with certainty. The earliest manuscripts of this work (written on bamboo tablets) date back to the late 4th century BCE, and these contain significant differences from the later received edition (of Wang Bi c. 226–249). Apart from the Guodian text and the Wang Bi edition, another alternative version exists, the Mawangdui Tao Te Chings.

Louis Komjathy writes that the Tao Te Ching is "actually a multi-vocal anthology consisting of a variety of historical and textual layers; in certain respects, it is a collection of oral teachings of various members of the inner cultivation lineages." Meanwhile, Russell Kirkland argues that the text arose out of "various traditions of oral wisdom" from the state of Chu that were written, circulated, edited, and rewritten by different hands. He also suggests that authors from the Jixia academy may have been involved in the editing process.

The Tao Te Ching is not organized in any clear fashion and is a collection of different sayings on various themes. The leading themes of the Tao Te Ching revolve around the nature of Tao, how to attain it and De, the inner power of Tao, as well as the idea of wu wei. Tao is said to be ineffable and accomplishes great things through small, lowly, effortless, and "feminine" (yin) ways (which are compared to the behavior of water).

Ancient commentaries on the Tao Te Ching are important texts in their own right. Perhaps the oldest one, the Heshang Gong commentary, was most likely written in the 2nd century CE. Other important commentaries include the one from Wang Bi and the Xiang'er commentary.

=== Zhuangzi ===
The Zhuangzi (Book of Master Zhuang, 莊子), named after its author Zhuang Zhou, is a highly influential composite text of multi-vocal writings from various sources and historical periods. The commentator and editor Guo Xiang (c. 300 CE) helped establish the text as an important source for Taoist thought. One traditional view is that a sage called Zhuang Zhou wrote the first seven chapters (the "inner chapters"), and his students and related thinkers were responsible for the other parts (the outer and miscellaneous chapters). However, some modern scholars, like Russell Kirkland, argue that Guo Xiang is actually the creator of the 33-chapter Zhuangzi text and that there is no solid historical data for the existence of Zhuang Zhou himself (other than the sparse and unreliable mentions in Sima Qian). Zhuangzi also introduced seven versions of the meeting between Laozi and Confucius. Laozi is portrayed as growing old, and his Taoist teachings confuse his famous interlocutors. Zhuangzi also provides the only record of Laozi's death.

The Zhuangzi uses anecdotes, parables, and dialogues to express one of its main themes—avoiding cultural constructs and instead living in a spontaneous way aligned with the natural world. This way of living might be perceived as "useless" by most people who follow their own "common sense" and social and political rules, but this uselessness is actually a wiser alternative, since it is more in accord with reality.

=== Daozang ===
The Daozang (道藏, “Daoist Canon”) is the principal collection of Taoist scriptures and related writings. Although earlier Taoist canons were compiled (such as the "Three Caverns") and revised in the medieval and Song–Jin periods, the only complete canon extant today is the Ming-dynasty edition, the Zhengtong Daozang (published in 1445), which contains roughly 1,500 texts. Following the example of the Buddhist Tripiṭaka, it is divided into three dong (洞, "caves" or "grottoes"). They are arranged from "highest" to "lowest":

- Cavern of Truth / Authenticity (Dongzhen 洞真), associated primarily with Shangqing materials.
- Cavern of Mystery (Dongxuan 洞玄), associated primarily with Lingbao scriptures.
- Cavern of Spirit (Dongshen 洞神), associated primarily with older traditions, especially the Sanhuang (Three Sovereigns) corpus.

In practice, Taoist communities and lineages typically draw on selected texts (often transmitted through teachers, ritual training, and local institutions) rather than treating the Daozang as a single, uniformly consulted book, though it remains a central reference for Taoist liturgy, doctrine, and textual study.

=== Additional Taoist texts ===
In addition to the Tao Teo Ching and Zhuangzi, other influential texts in the Taoist tradition include:

==== Warring States / early Han texts ====
- Liezi (列子), a Taoist text attributed to Lie Yukou (trad. 5th c. BCE) but widely thought to have been compiled in its received form around the 4th century CE. It is associated with early Taoist philosophy and later regarded (especially in the Tang) as a major Taoist classic alongside the Tao Te Ching and Zhuangzi.
- Neiye (內業), a 4th-century BCE text on self-cultivation that emphasizes breath/qi practices and training the heart-mind (xin). The ideas found in this text influenced later Taoist conceptions of internal alchemy.
- Wenzi (文子), A Taoist-oriented text attributed in tradition to a disciple of Laozi, generally dated by modern scholarship to the early Han period and presenting teachings aligned with the Daode jing.

==== Han institutional Taoist texts ====
- The Taipingjing (太平經, “Scripture of Great Peace”), a major early Taoist scripture associated with Han-era religious movements, combining cosmology, ethics, and visions of social and political renewal.
- Liexian Zhuan (列仙傳, “Biographies of Immortals”), an Eastern Han (2nd c. CE) text that is the earliest Taoist hagiography of Taoist xian ("immortals").
- Shenxian Zhuan (神仙傳, “Biographies of Divine Immortals”), a Taoist hagiography of immortals partially attributed to the Taoist scholar Ge Hong (283–343).

==== Six Dynasties–Tang medieval “scriptural Taoism” texts ====
- Baopuzi neipian (抱朴子內篇, “Inner Chapters of the Master Who Embraces Simplicity”), the “Inner Chapters” attributed to Ge Hong (4th c. CE), is a major early source on Taoist immortality, longevity techniques, and alchemical/cultivation theory.
- Huangting jing (黃庭經, “Yellow Court Classic”), a foundational Taoist meditation text associated with the Shangqing tradition, describing inner visualization and cultivation practices using the imagery of internal deities and bodily “palaces.”
- The Dadong zhenjing (大洞真經, “Perfect Scripture of the Great Cavern”) and the Lingshu ziwen (靈書紫文, “Purple Texts Inscribed by the Spirits”), two of the most influential Supreme Clarity scriptures.
- Wupian zhenwen (五篇真文, “Perfect Writings in Five Sections”), a foundational Lingbao scripture.
- Ling Bao Bi Fai (靈寶畢法, “Complete Methods of the Numinous Treasure”), a Lingbao manual of longevity practices and neidan.
- Zuowanglun (坐忘論, “Essay on Sitting in Forgetfulness”), a work on zuòwàng ("sitting forgetting") meditation by Sima Chengzhen (647–735 CE), reflecting interactions between Taoism and Buddhism.
- Huahujing (化胡經, “Classic of Converting the Barbarians”), a medieval Taoist polemical text that portrays Laozi as traveling west and frames Buddhism as derived from his teaching.

==== Song–Yuan internal alchemy texts ====
- Cantong qi (參同契, “The Kinship of the Three”), a text often dated to the late Han (c. 2nd century CE) that became a foundational classic for Song–Yuan internal alchemy (neidan) through extensive later commentary and reinterpretation.
- Huashu (化書, “Book of Transformations”), a 930 CE Taoist classic about internal alchemy, psychological subjectivity, and spiritual transformation.
- Wuzhen pian (悟真篇, “Awakening to Reality”), a major Song-dynasty internal alchemy text by Zhang Boduan (987? - 1082).
- Huangdi Yinfujing (黃帝陰符經, “Scripture of the Yellow Emperor’s Hidden Talisman”), a medieval Taoist text later central to internal- alchemy traditions, combining cosmological and technical teachings.

==== Song–Ming–Qing Quanzhen/monastic and popular Taoism texts ====
- Qingjing Jing (清靜經, “Classic of Clarity and Stillness”), a short Taoist scripture emphasizing purity and stillness, widely used in Quanzhen contexts and often read as synthesizing Taoist themes with Buddhism.
- The Lijiao shiwu lun (Fifteen discourses to Establish the Teachings), A set of Quanzhen doctrinal discourses attributed to Wang Chongyang that outlines key principles of Quanzhen practice and religious life.
- Zhonghe ji (中和集, “Book/Collection of Balance and Harmony”) a 13th-century anthology by Daochun Li that outlines the teachings and practices of the Quanzhen School.
- Taishang Ganying pian (太上感應篇, “Treatise of the Exalted One on Response and Retribution”), a wildly circulated morality tract that discusses sin and ethics. It asserts that those in harmony with Tao will live long and fruitful lives while the wicked (and their descendants) will suffer and have shortened lives.
- Taiyi Jinhua zongzhi (太乙金華宗旨, “The Secret of the Golden Flower”), an influential internal alchemy text from the late 17th century.
- Longmen precept and teaching texts (龍門派; Wang Changyue), a set of Qing-dynasty Longmen (Dragon Gate) lineage works by Wang Changyue that codify monastic discipline and ordination stages, including Chuzhen jie, Zhongji jie, Tianxian jie, and Longmen xinfa.

=== Influential Chinese classic texts ===
Taoists also frequently engaged with important Chinese classics that are not themselves Taoist, but draw on other aspects of Chinese cosmology and philosophy:

- I Ching (Yijing, 易經), an ancient divination classic that profoundly shaped Taoist correlative thought and ritual frameworks. The divination method in the I Ching and its associated concepts of yin and yang mapped into 64 hexagrams—combinations of the 8 bagua trigrams—has influenced Taoism from its inception until today.
- Analects (論語) and Mengzi (孟子), the classic texts of Confucianism that Taoists engaged extensively, often through critique and reinterpretation.
- The Mozi, a Warring States text of Mohist philosophy which was later adopted as a Taoist text by Taoists (some of whom saw master Mozi as a Taoist immortal and included the Mozi into the Taoist canon).
- Guanzi (管子), an early text associated with the state of Qi that contains influential chapters on governance and self-cultivation.
- The Han Feizi (韓非子, "Book of Master Han Fei"), a major Legalist work that includes themes later associated with Taoist political philosophy, especially wuwei and non-interference as techniques of rule.
- Lüshi Chunqiu (呂氏春秋), an early encyclopedic compendium which is widely quoted in early Taoist sources.
- Huangdi Neijing (黃帝內經, "The Inner Canon of the Yellow Emperor"), an ancient Chinese medical text whose physiological and qi-based models strongly influenced Taoist health practices and theories of inner cultivation.
- Huainanzi (淮南子), A Han-dynasty synthesis text (c. 139 BCE) that integrates Taoist, Confucian, and Legalist philosophy.
- Guiguzi (鬼谷子), a text on persuasion and strategic technique associated with “School of Diplomacy” traditions later referenced in some Taoist writings.
- Heguanzi, A 3rd-century syncretic collection of writings from the Chinese Hundred Schools of Thought.

== Symbols and images ==
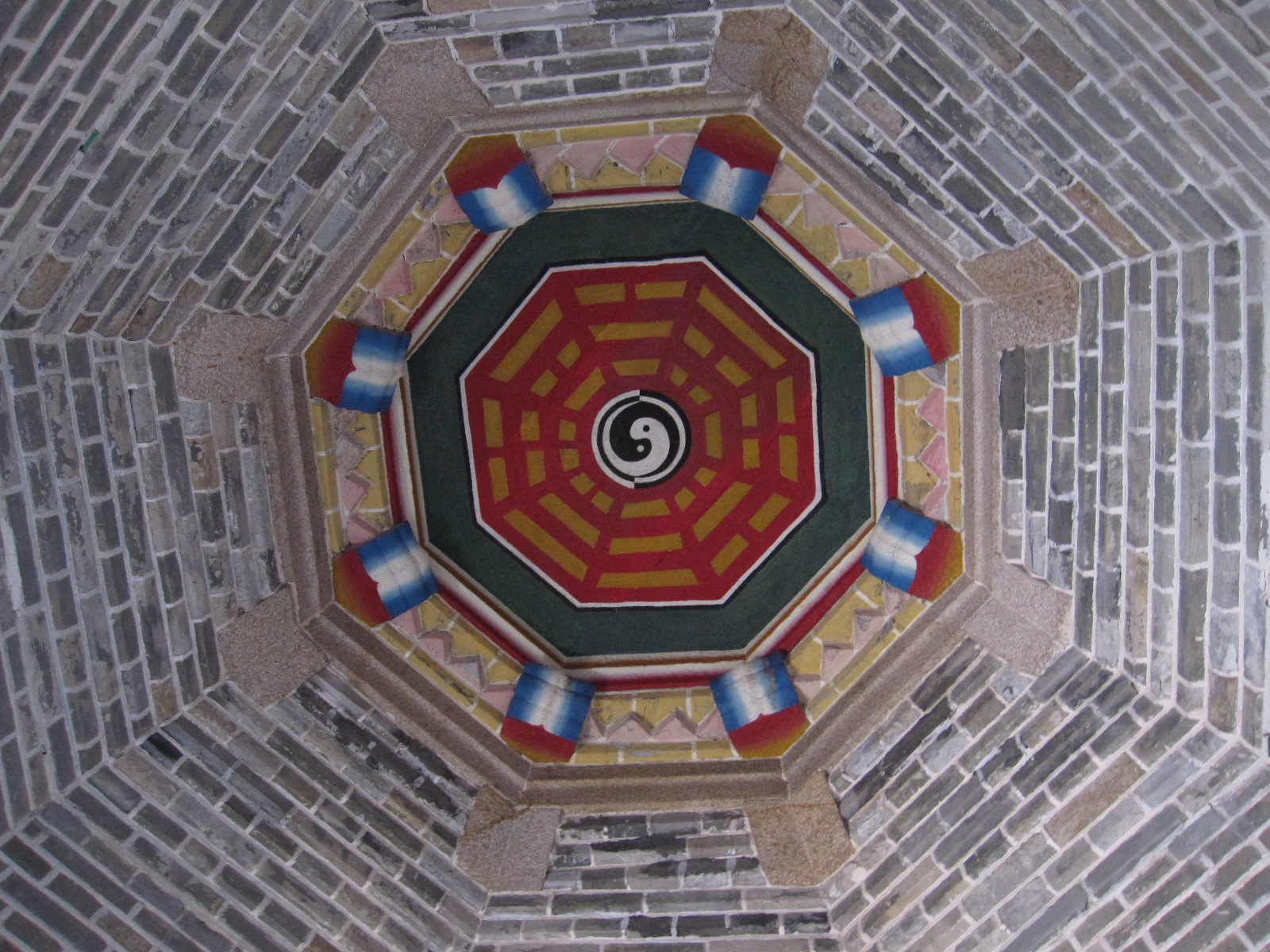
A spider web ceiling depicting a taijitu surrounded by the bagua

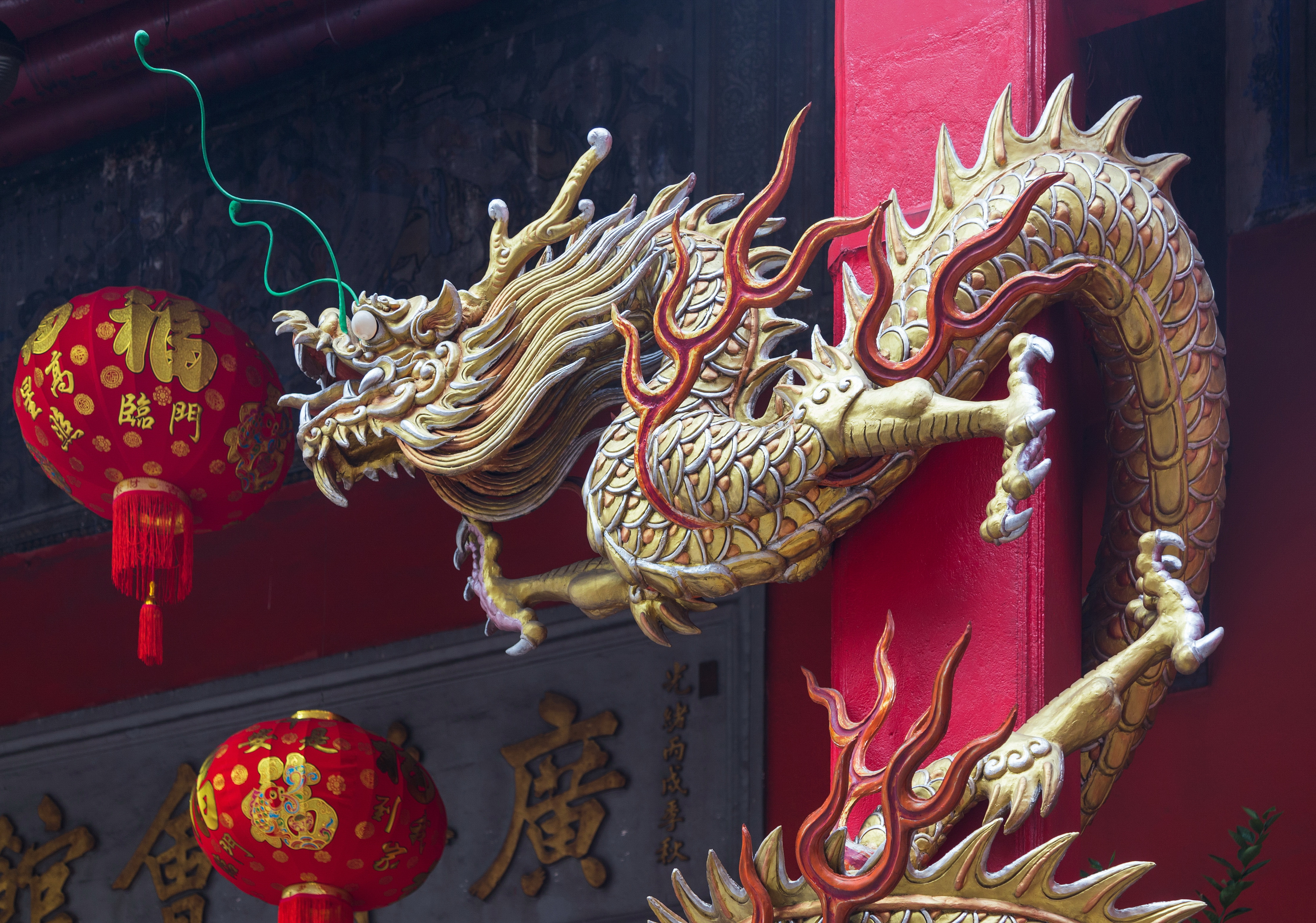
Chinese dragon at Guan Di Taoist Temple, Kuala Lumpur, Malaysia

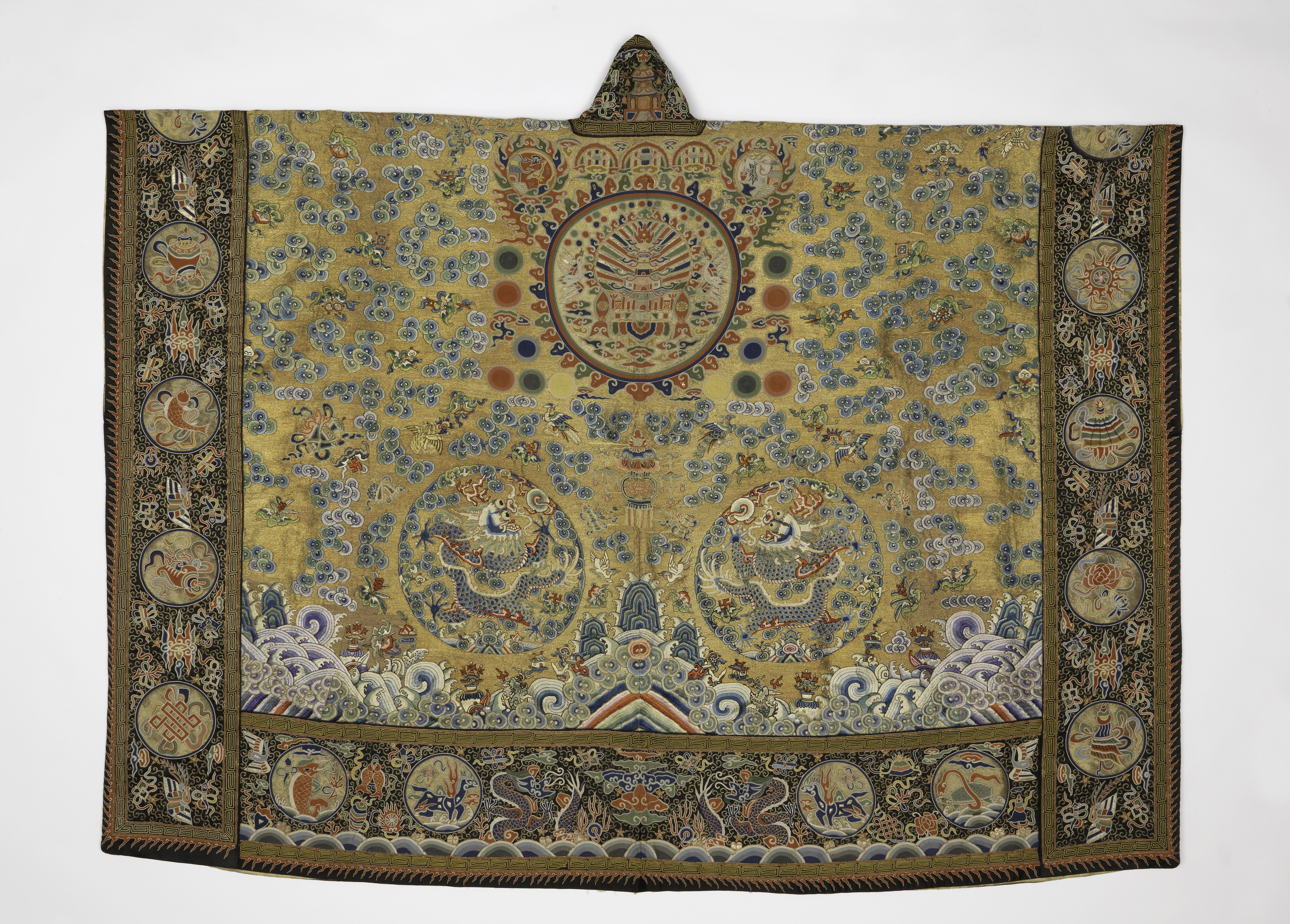
Chinese Taoist Priest's Robe, 19th century. Aside from Taoist symbols like the dragon, it also adopts the eight auspicious symbols from Buddhism

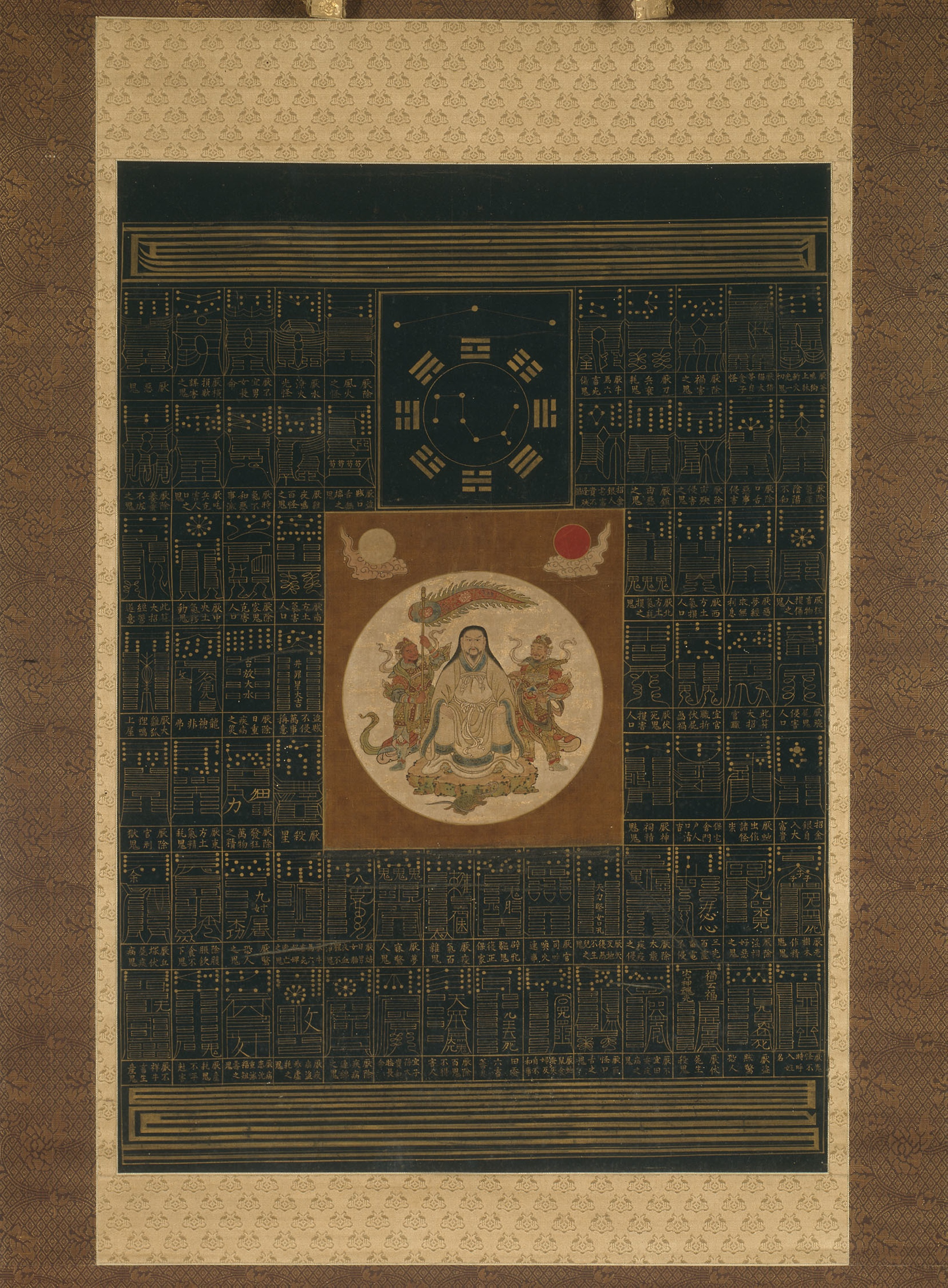
Zhenwu depicted with the bagua and Northern Dipper, surrounded by Taoist talismans

The taijitu, commonly known as the "yin and yang" or "yin-yang" symbol, and bagua are important symbols in Taoism because they represent key elements of Taoist cosmology (see above). Many Taoist (as well as non-Taoist) organizations make use of these symbols, and they may appear on flags and logos, temple floors, or stitched into clerical robes. What has become the standardised yin-yang taijitu originated as a Taoist symbol in the 10th century CE during the early Song dynasty.

The tiger and Chinese dragon are more ancient symbols for yin and yang respectively, and these two animals are still widely used in Taoist art. Taoist temples in southern China and Taiwan may often be identified by their roofs, which feature dragons, tigers, and phoenixes (with the phoenix also standing for yin) made from multicolored ceramic tiles. In general though, Chinese Taoist architecture lacks universal features that distinguish it from other structures.

Taoist temples may fly square or triangular flags. They typically feature mystical writing, talismans, or diagrams and are intended to fulfill various functions including providing guidance for the spirits of the dead, bringing good fortune, increasing life span, etc. Other flags and banners may be those of the gods or immortals themselves.

Drawings of the Big Dipper (also called the Bushel) are also important symbols. In the Shang dynasty of the 2nd millennium BCE, Chinese thought regarded the Big Dipper as a deity, while, in later periods, it came to symbolize taijitu. A related symbol is the flaming pearl, which stands for the pole star and may be seen on such roofs between two dragons as well as on the hairpin of a Celestial Master.

Some Taoists saw the stars as "knots in the 'net of Heaven'" that connected everything in "heaven and earth".

Many Taoists saw the Tao as "the [metaphorical] pearl of the sage" and a "conjunction between yin...[and] yang." Taoists also revered pearls more generally, seeing Chinese dragon celestials as emerging from the glint of light off of a pearl that existed "in the mists of chaos" and trapped in an endless cycle where they continually retrieve the pearl that makes them out of the mists. Some Internal Alchemy Taoists worshipped mercury as "divine water" and an embodiment of consciousness that was a "flowing pearl".

In the later Qing dynasty, Taoists and intellectuals who leaned towards Taoism used the wuxing as symbols of leadership and good governance, using old religious texts and various historiographies made in prior dynasties to assign a phase from the five wuxing to different Chinese dynasties.

Symbols that represent longevity and immortality are particularly popular, and these include: cranes, pine trees, and the peaches of immortality (associated with the Queen Mother of the West). Natural symbols are also common, and include gourds, caves, clouds, mountains, and the animals of the Chinese zodiac. Other symbols used by Taoists include: the Yellow River Map, the Luoshu Square, I Ching coins, Taoist talismans (fulu), the Four Symbols, and various Chinese characters (such as the character for Tao and the shou ('longevity') character).

Taoist priests also wear distinctive robes, such as the Daojiao fushi and Taoist versions of the Daopao, which symbolize their status and school affiliation.

== Society ==
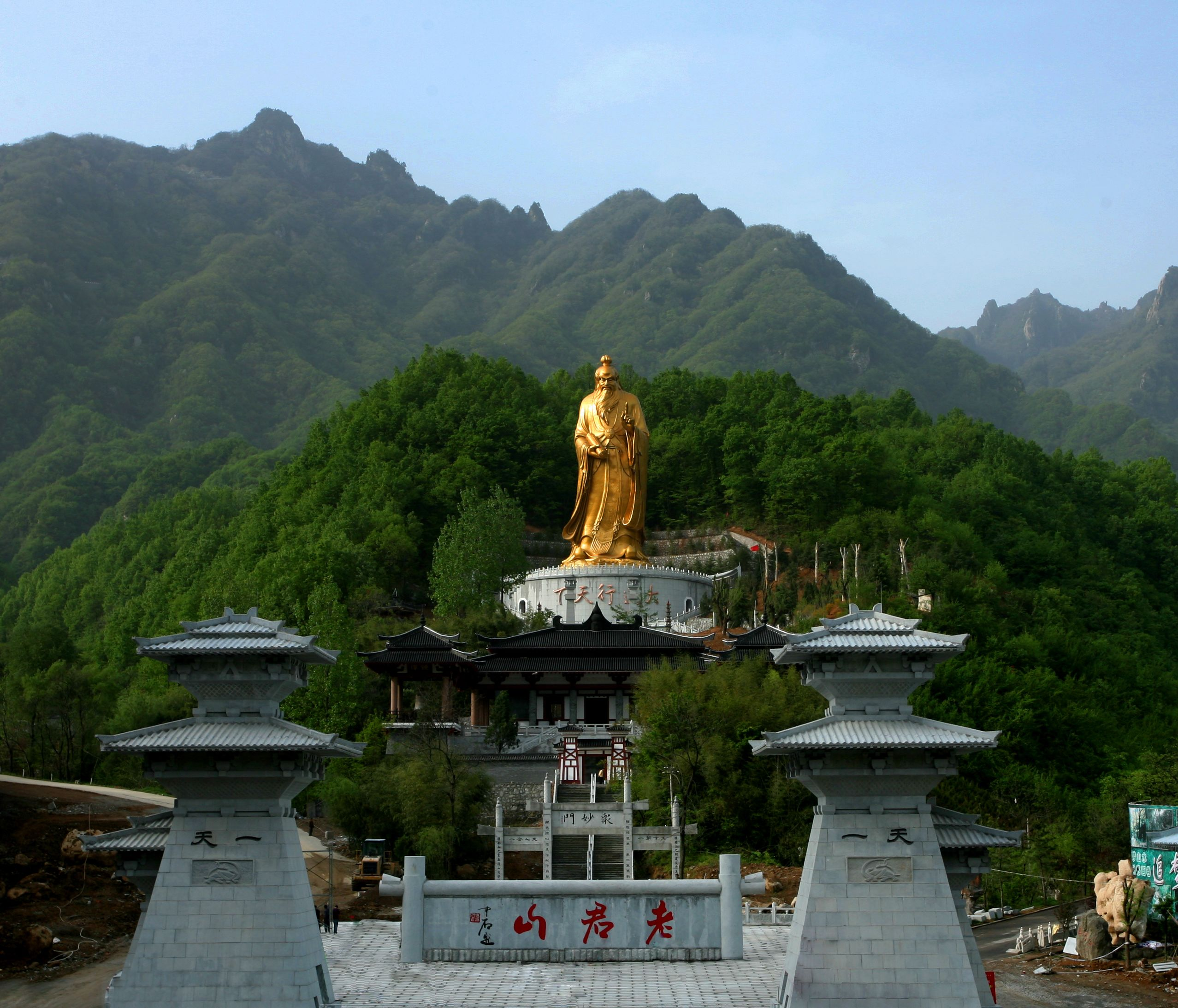
Laojun Mountain temple of Laozi

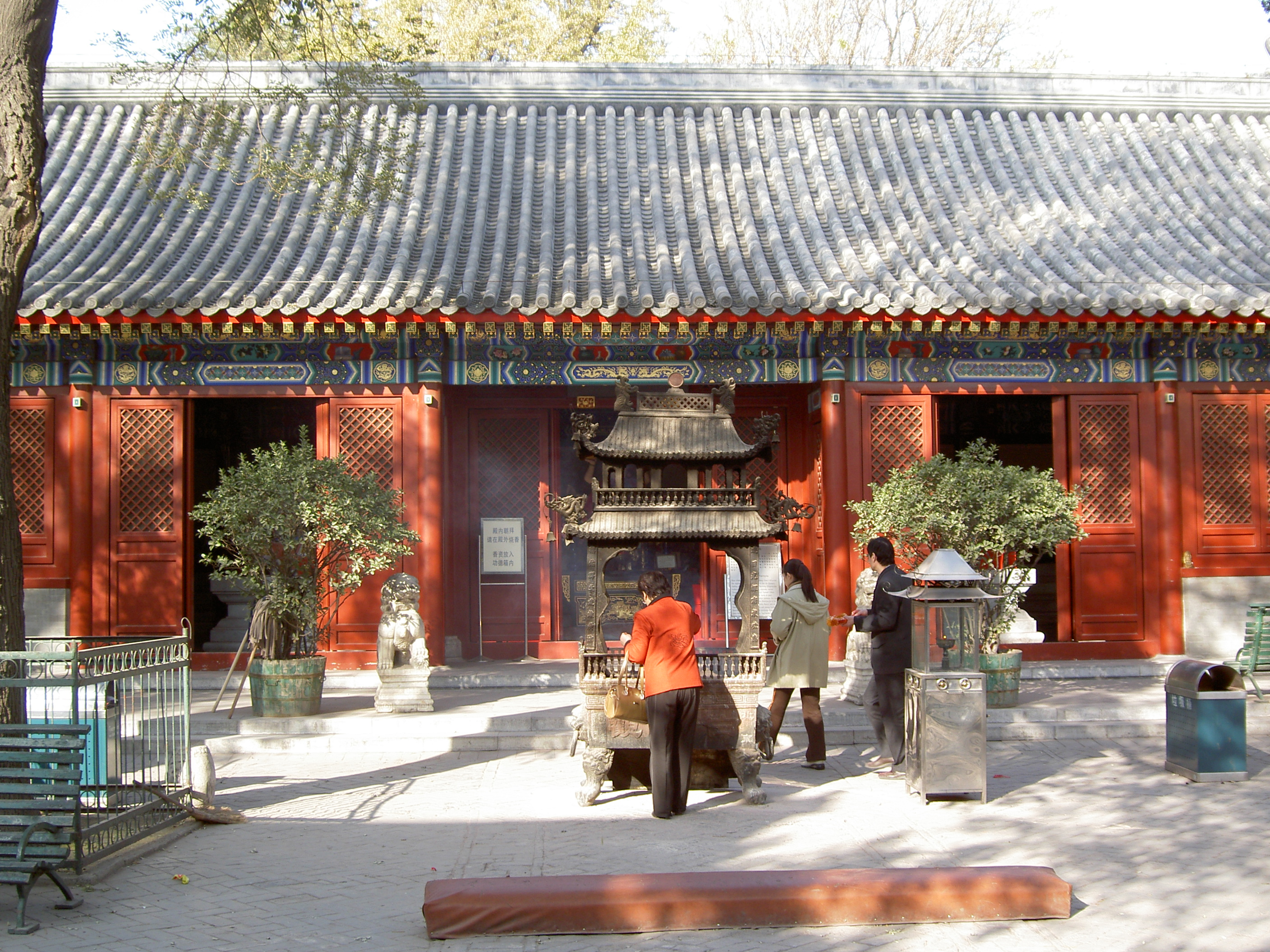
The White Cloud Temple in Beijing

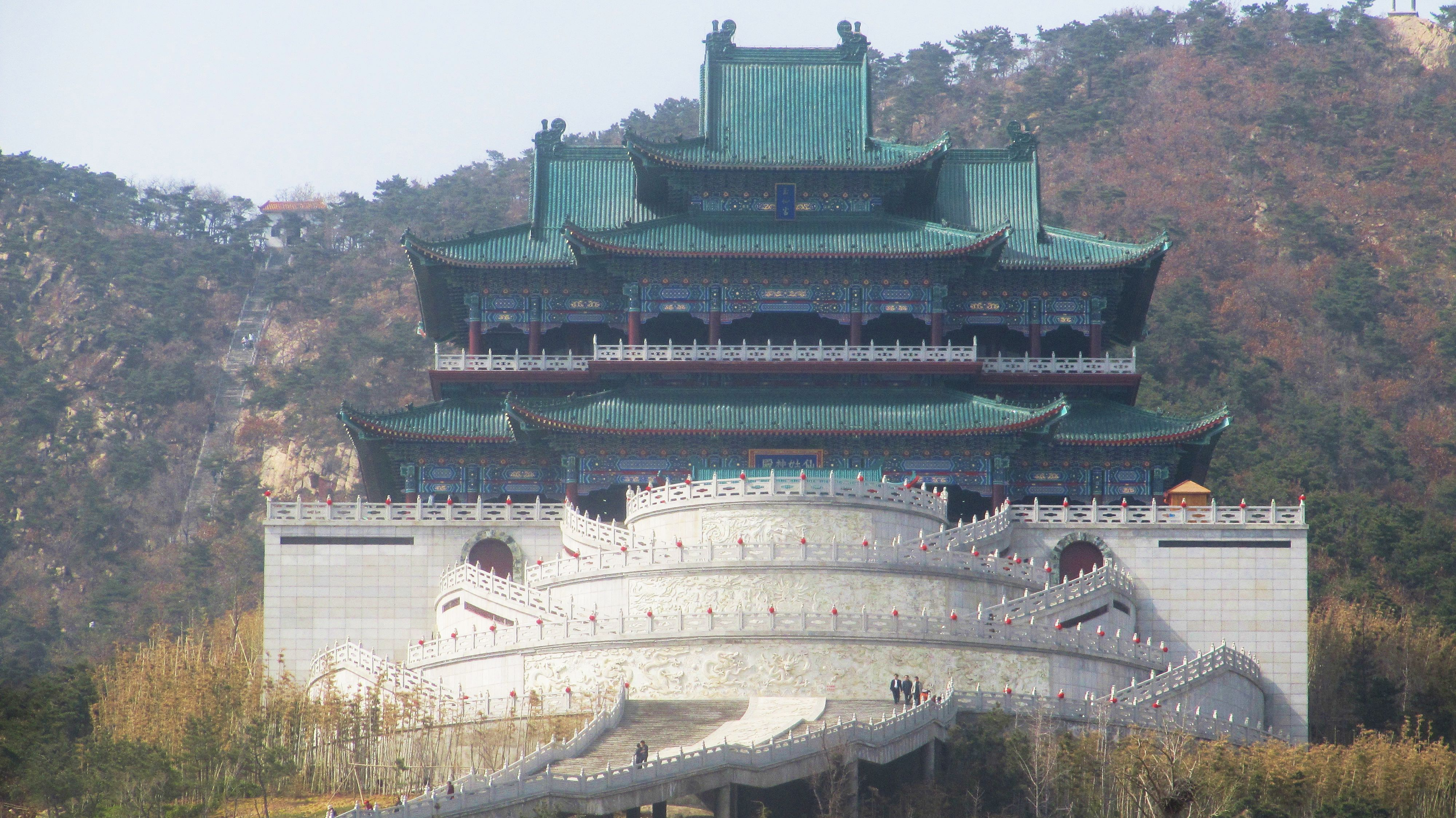
Xianguting Temple, a Taoguan in Weihai, Shandong

Taoist communities can include a wide variety of people and groups, including daoshi, hermits, monastics, teachers, householders, ascetics, family lineages, teacher-disciple lineages, urban associations, temples, and monasteries.

According to Russell Kirkland, throughout most of its history, most Taoist traditions "were founded and maintained by aristocrats or by members of the later well-to-do 'gentry' class". The only real exception is the Celestial Masters movement, which had a strong basis in the lower classes (though even this movement had a hereditary leadership made up of figures of the Chang clan for generations).

=== Adherents ===
The number of Taoists is difficult to estimate, due to a variety of factors, including defining Taoism. According to a survey of religion in China in 2010, the number of people practicing some form of Chinese folk religion is near to 950 million, which is 70% of Chinese. Among these, 173 million (13%) claim an affiliation with Taoist practices. 12 million people stated that they were "Taoists", a term traditionally used exclusively for initiates, priests, and experts of Taoist rituals and methods.

Since the creation of the People's Republic of China, the government has encouraged a revival of Taoist traditions in codified settings. In 1956, the Chinese Taoist Association was formed to administer the activities of all registered Taoist orders, and received official approval in 1957. It was disbanded during the Cultural Revolution, but was reestablished in 1980. The headquarters of the association are at the Baiyunguan, or White Cloud Temple of Beijing, belonging to the Longmen branch of the Quanzhen tradition. Since 1980, many Taoist monasteries and temples have been reopened or rebuilt, both belonging to the Zhengyi or Quanzhen schools, and ordination has been resumed.

Taoist literature and art has influenced the cultures of Korea, Japan, and Vietnam. Organized Taoism seems not to have attracted a large non-Chinese following until modern times. In Taiwan, 7.5 million people, 33% of the population, identify themselves as Taoists. Data collected in 2010 for religious demographics of Hong Kong and Singapore show that, respectively, 14% and 11% of the people of these cities identify as Taoists.

Followers of Taoism are present in Chinese émigré communities outside Asia. It has attracted followers with no Chinese heritage. For example, in Brazil there are Taoist temples in São Paulo and Rio de Janeiro that are affiliated with the Taoist Society of China. Membership of these temples is entirely of non-Chinese ancestry.

=== Art and poetry ===
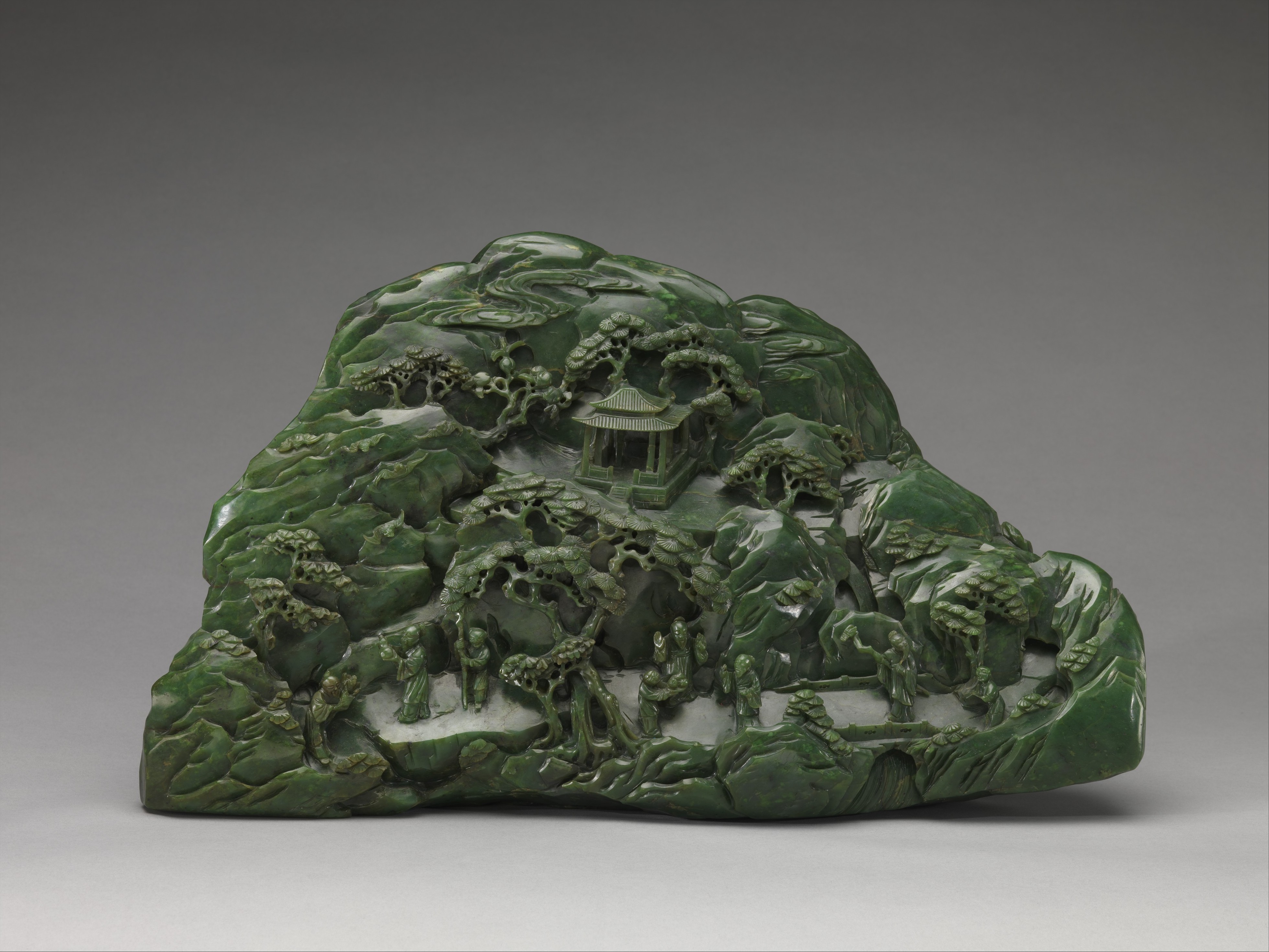
Carved jade boulder with a Taoist paradise

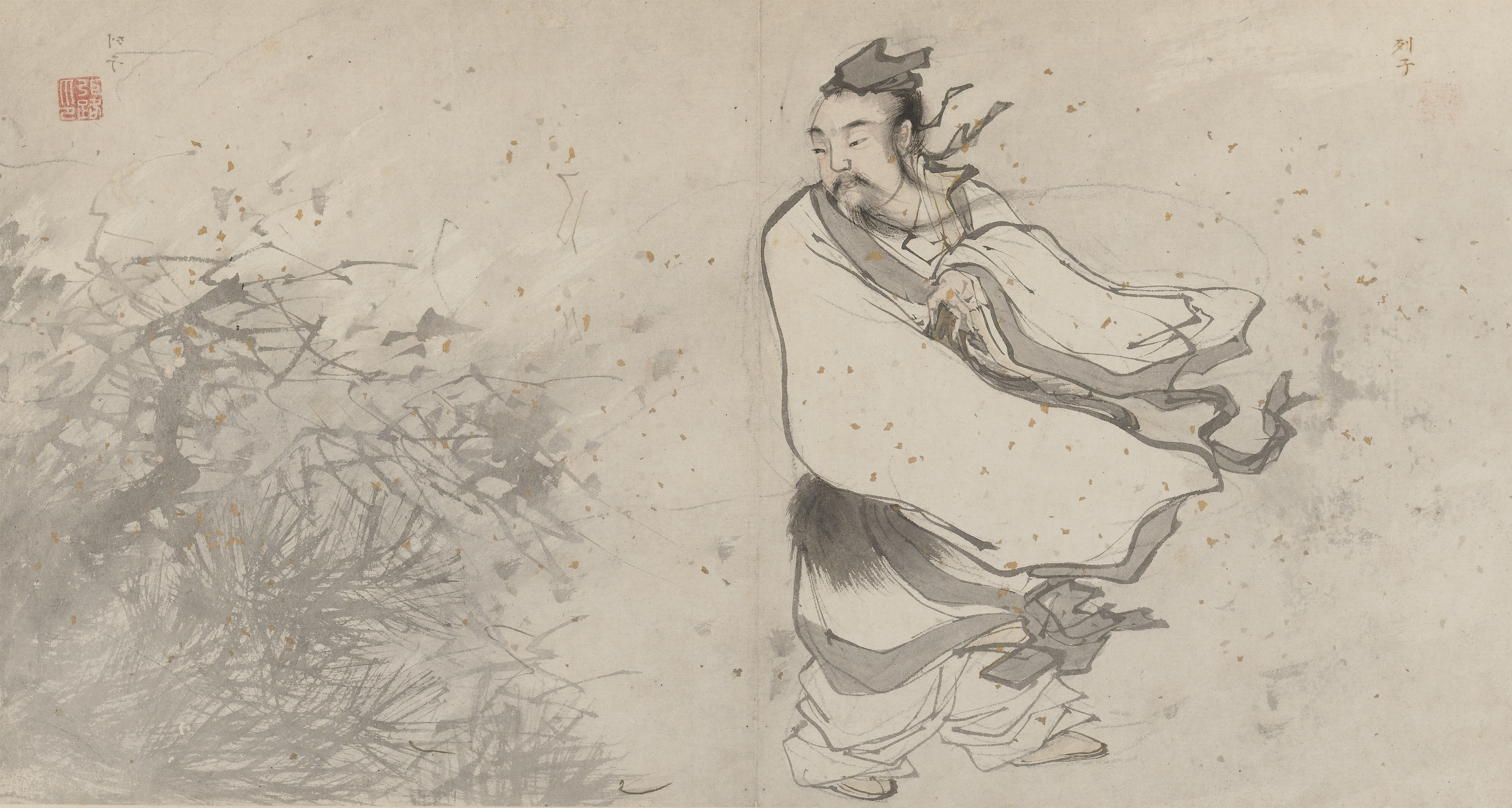
A 16th-century painting of the immortal Liezi by Zhang Lu (1464–1538)

Throughout Chinese history, there have been many examples of art being influenced by Taoism. Notable painters influenced by Taoism include Wu Wei, Huang Gongwang, Mi Fu, Muqi Fachang, Shitao, Ni Zan, Tang Mi, and Wang Zengzu. Taoist arts and belles-lettres represents the different regions, dialects, and time spans that are commonly associated with Taoism. Ancient Taoist art was commissioned by the aristocracy; however, scholars masters and adepts also directly engaged in the art themselves.

=== Political views and influence ===
Taoist texts and traditions do not present a single unified political doctrine. However, both the Tao Te Ching and Zhuangzi repeatedly express skepticism toward coercive rule, war, and punitive governance, often recommending forms of wúwéi (non-interfering rule) and simplicity. The Zhuangzi’s Inner Chapters (1–7) are frequently read as expressing skepticism toward political life and fixed normative standpoints, emphasizing perspective and adaptability rather than a detailed program of governance.

Early imperial Huang–Lao thought is often associated with statecraft and imperial governance (including ideals of rulerly wuwei), while some “Primitivist” materials in the Zhuangzi (commonly grouped as chapters 8–11) have been interpreted as advancing an anarchistic or anti-statist vision. The syncretist position found in texts like the Huainanzi and some of the Outer Chapters of the Zhuangzi blend Taoist positions with Confucian views.

Despite the fact Taoist traditions are associated with ideals of minimal governance and withdrawal from political ambition, Taoism has played an important role at court as a source of ritual power and dynastic legitimacy throughout Chinese history. For example. during the Tang dynasty, the ruling Li family explicitly linked its genealogy to Laozi (whose traditional surname was also Li) and imperial patronage of Taoism helped reinforce the dynasty's claim to rule.

=== Relations with other traditions ===
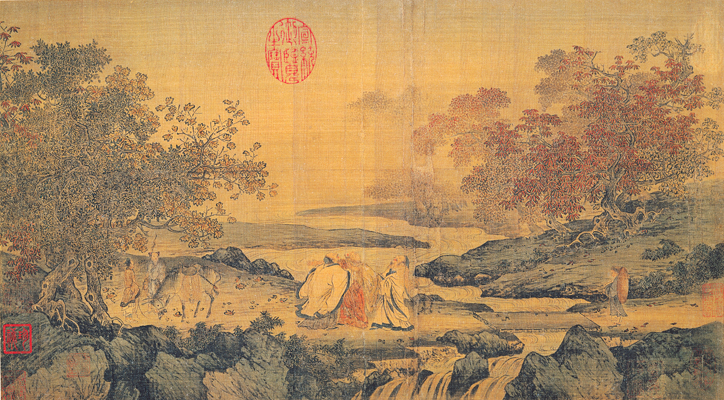
A painting in the litang style portraying "three laughs at tiger brook" which illustrates the unity of the three teachings, 12th century, Song dynasty

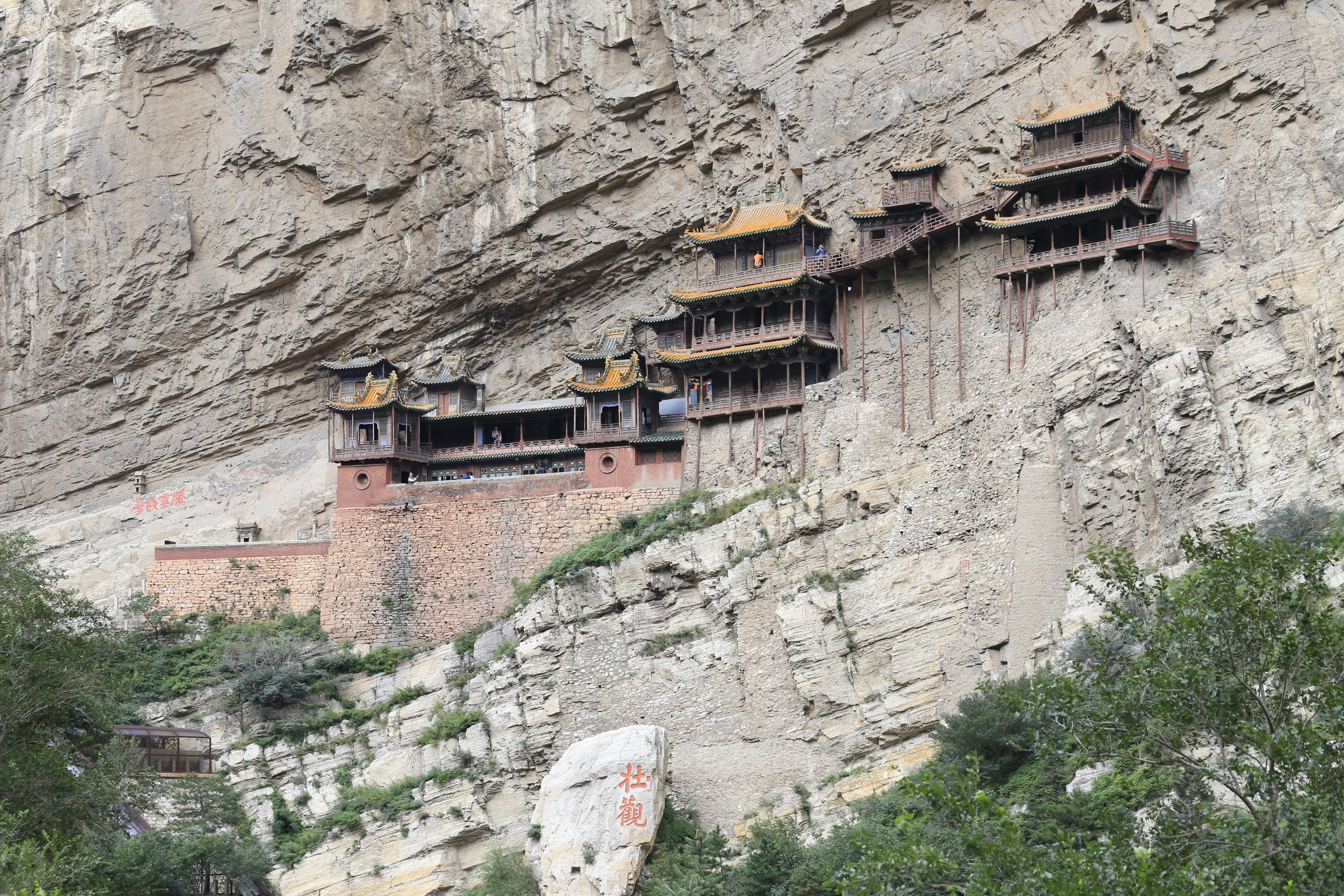
The Hanging Temple, a temple which contains elements from all three teachings

Many scholars believe Taoism arose as a counter-movement to Confucianism. The philosophical terms Tao and De are shared by both Taoism and Confucianism. However, in the Daodejing and the Zhuangzi, Confucian ritual propriety and hierarchical social conventions are often treated skeptically, and the texts instead emphasize ziran (“naturalness”), spontaneity, and nonconformity.

Zhuang Zhou explicitly criticized Confucian and Mohist tenets in his work. In the Zhuangzi, Confucians and Mohists frequently serve as representative “moralist” schools: Zhuangzi criticizes them for adhering to fixed unchanging moral rules, for getting stuck in arguments over “right and wrong,” and for trying to force narrow, one-size-fits-all prescriptions on a world that looks different from different perspectives.

The entry of Buddhism into China was marked by significant interaction and syncretism with Taoism. Originally seen as a kind of "foreign Taoism", Buddhism's scriptures were translated into Chinese using the Taoist vocabulary. Representatives of early Chinese Buddhism, like Sengzhao and Tao Sheng, knew and were deeply influenced by the Taoist keystone texts.

Taoism especially shaped the development of Chan Buddhism, introducing elements like the concept of naturalness, distrust of scripture and text, and emphasis on embracing "this life" and living in the "every-moment". Zhuangzi's statements that the Tao was omnipresent and that creation escorts animals and humans to death influenced Chinese Buddhist practitioners and scholars, especially Chan Buddhists. On the other hand, Taoism also incorporated Buddhist elements during the Tang dynasty. A key example of this can be seen in the Lingbao tradition, an important set of Taoist texts that incorporated Buddhist ideas of karma, death and rebirth, and Buddhist cosmology into the Taoist tradition. Later, in the 12th century, the Quanzhen School of Taoism was explicitly founded on three teachings philosophy, incorporating the mediation techniques and monastic organization of Buddhism alongside the ethical discipline and social responsibility of Confucianism.

Ideological and political rivals for centuries, Taoism, Confucianism, and Buddhism deeply influenced one another. For example, Wang Bi, one of the most influential philosophical commentators on Laozi (and the I Ching), was a Confucian. The three rivals also share some similar values, with all three embracing a humanist philosophy emphasizing moral behavior and human perfection. In time, most Chinese people identified to some extent with all three traditions simultaneously. This became institutionalized when aspects of the three schools were synthesized in the Neo-Confucian school.

Christian and Taoist contact often took place in the Tang dynasty, and some scholars believe that the Church of the East influenced Taoist thought on the Three Pure Ones. Emperor Taizong encouraged this, and Taoists who agreed with him and his laws incorporated elements of Christianity, Islam, Manichaeism, Judaism, Confucianism, and Buddhism into their faith.

=== Comparisons with other religions ===
Comparisons between Taoism and Epicureanism have focused on the absence of a creator or gods controlling the forces of nature in both. Lucretius' poem De rerum natura describes a naturalist cosmology where there are only atoms and void (a primal duality which mirrors yin-yang in its dance of assertion/yielding), and where nature takes its course with no gods or masters. Other parallels include the similarities between Taoist wu wei (effortless action) and Epicurean lathe biosas (live in obscurity), focus on naturalness (ziran) as opposed to conventional virtues, and the prominence of the Epicurus-like Chinese sage Yang Chu in the foundational Taoist writings.

Some authors have undertaken comparative studies of Taoism and Christianity. This has been of interest for students of the history of religion such as J. J. M. de Groot, among others. A comparison of the teachings of Laozi and Jesus of Nazareth has been made by several authors, such as Martin Aronson, and Toropov & Hansen (2002), who believe that there are parallels that should not be ignored. In the opinion of J. Isamu Yamamoto, the main difference is that Christianity preaches a personal God while Taoism does not. Yet, a number of authors, including Lin Yutang, have argued that some moral and ethical tenets of the religions are similar. In neighboring Vietnam, Taoist values have been shown to adapt to social norms and formed emerging sociocultural beliefs together with Confucianism.

== Varieties ==
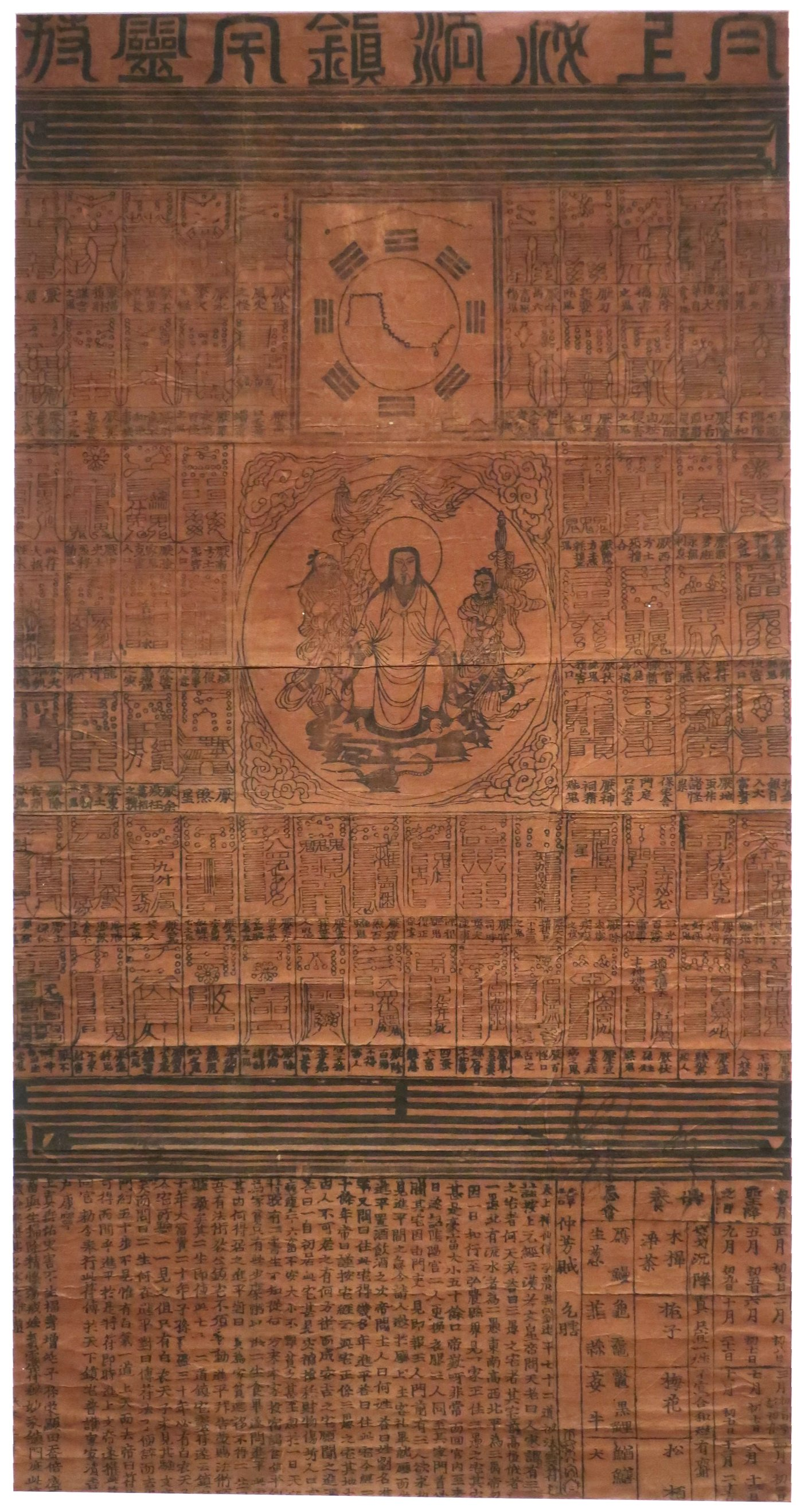
Chart of Taoist Talismans, Japan, Muromachi period, 1553, anonymous woodblock print, James Michener Collection, Honolulu Museum of Art

Throughout its history, many schools and branches of Taoism emerged, organized around particular lineages, texts, or sacred mountains and temples. In the modern era, religious Taoism in China is described as being organized around two enduring traditions:

Zhengyi (正一, “Orthodox Unity”) Taoism is the principle non-monastic Taoist denomination, traced to the Celestial Masters tradition that began with Zhang Daoling in 185 CE. Zhengyi priests live in society (often marrying and maintaining households) and function primarily as ritual specialists serving local communities through public services. These services include such as jiao offerings/renewal rites, zhai fasts and purification observances, funerary and salvation rites, exorcistic and healing rituals, and the use of talismans and registers that confer ritual authority.

Quanzhen Taoism (全真, “Complete Perfection”) represents the monastic form of Taoism, founded in the 12th century by Wang Chongyang. It emphasizes celibate communal life, formal ordination and precepts, meditation and contemplative discipline, and inner cultivation practices such as internal alchemy (neidan). It is framed explicitly through a "Three Teachings" synthesis that combines Taoist cosmology, Buddhist meditative and monastic models, and Confucian ethical self-regulation.

These two traditions developed during the Song dynasty and grew to become recognized by the imperial government during late imperial China. There are also various smaller Taoist groups and traditions of practice.

One modern, interpretive framework created by Eva Wong divides the major "systems" of Taoism into five categories: Magical Taoism, Divinational Taoism, Ceremonial Taoism, Internal-Alchemical Taoism and Action and Karma Taoism.

=== Magical Taoism ===
Magical Taoism is one of the oldest Taoist systems, and its practices are similar to the shamans and sorcerers of ancient China. Magical Taoism believes there are various natural powers, deities, and spirits (benevolent and malevolent) in the universe that can be made use of by specialists who know the right methods. Their magic can include rainmaking, protection, exorcism, healing, traveling to the underworld to help the dead, and mediumship.

Protection magic can include the use of amulets and fulu, as well as specific rites. Protection rites often include ritual petitions to the celestial deities of the northern bushel. Divination is also a widespread practice. A commonly used method of divination in magical Taoism is sandwriting (planchette writing).

According to Eva Wong, the main sects of magical Taoism today are the secretive Maoshan sect, not to be confused with Shangqing), the Celestial Masters and the Kun-Lun sect (which is strongly influenced by Tibetan magic and make use of Taoist and Buddhist deities).

=== Divinational Taoism ===
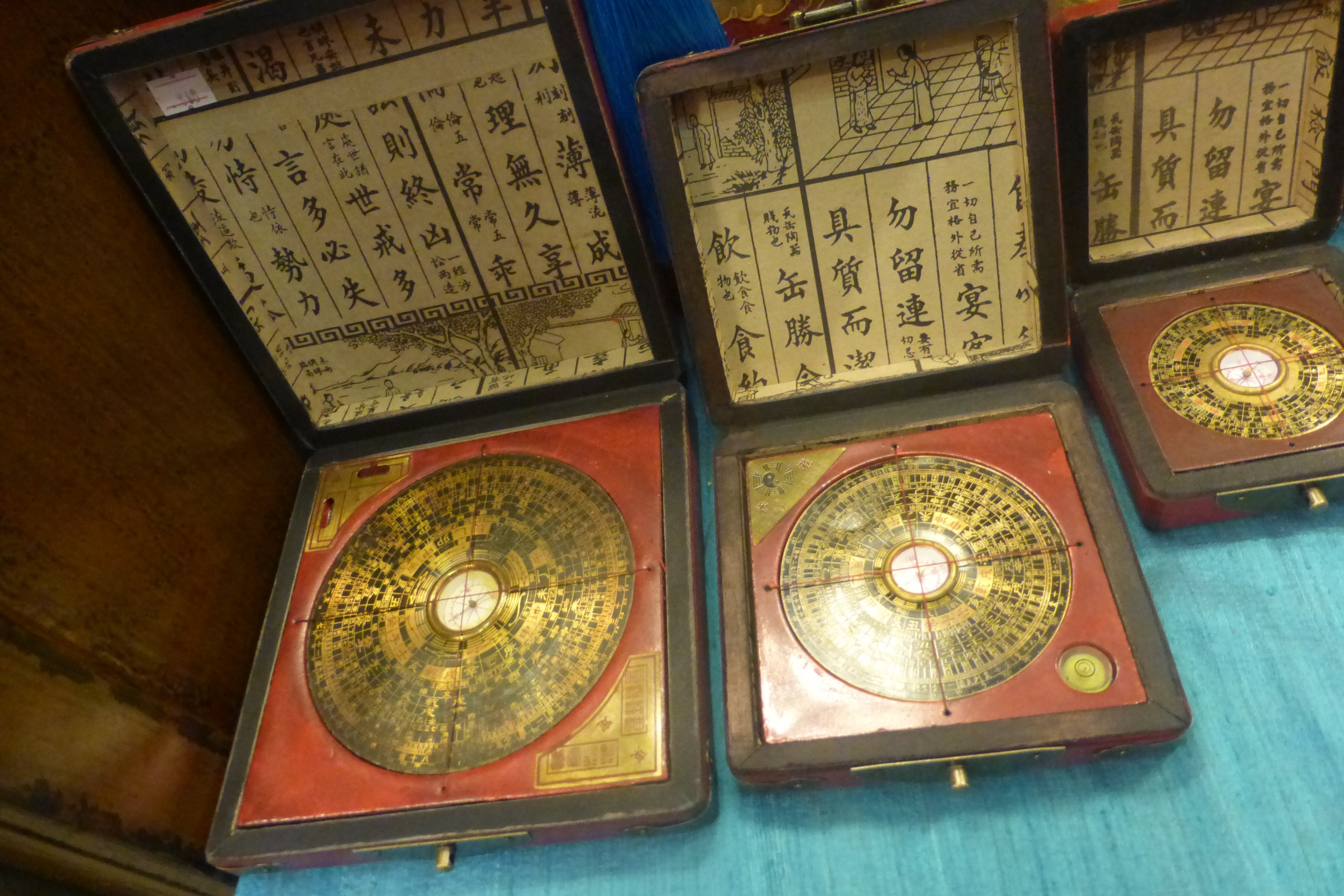
Three luopans (geomantic compasses) used in feng shui

Divinational Taoism focuses on various divination techniques to help one predict the future and live accordingly. This practice can also carry deeper spiritual significance, since it can help one appreciate the flux of the Tao. This form of Taoism owes much to the ancient Fangshi, the Yin and yang school of thought, and often relies on the I Ching.

This tradition also relies on the cosmology of Wuji and Taiji, along with the teachings of yin and yang, the five elements and the Chinese calendar. There many forms of Taoist divination, they include: celestial divination (which include various systems of Chinese astrology, like Tzu-wei tu-su), terrestrial divination (feng shui), the casting of incense sticks with hexagrams on them and the interpretation of omens.

Contemporary divinational Taoism is practiced in temples and monasteries by various individuals and may not be sect specific (it is even practiced by non-Taoists). This Taoist practice can be found in the Mao-shan sorcerers, the Celestial Masters sect and the Dragon Gate Taoism and Wudang Mountains sects. There are also many lay practitioners that are not affiliated with any specific sect. These lay Taoist practitioners are called "kui-shih".

=== Ceremonial Taoism ===
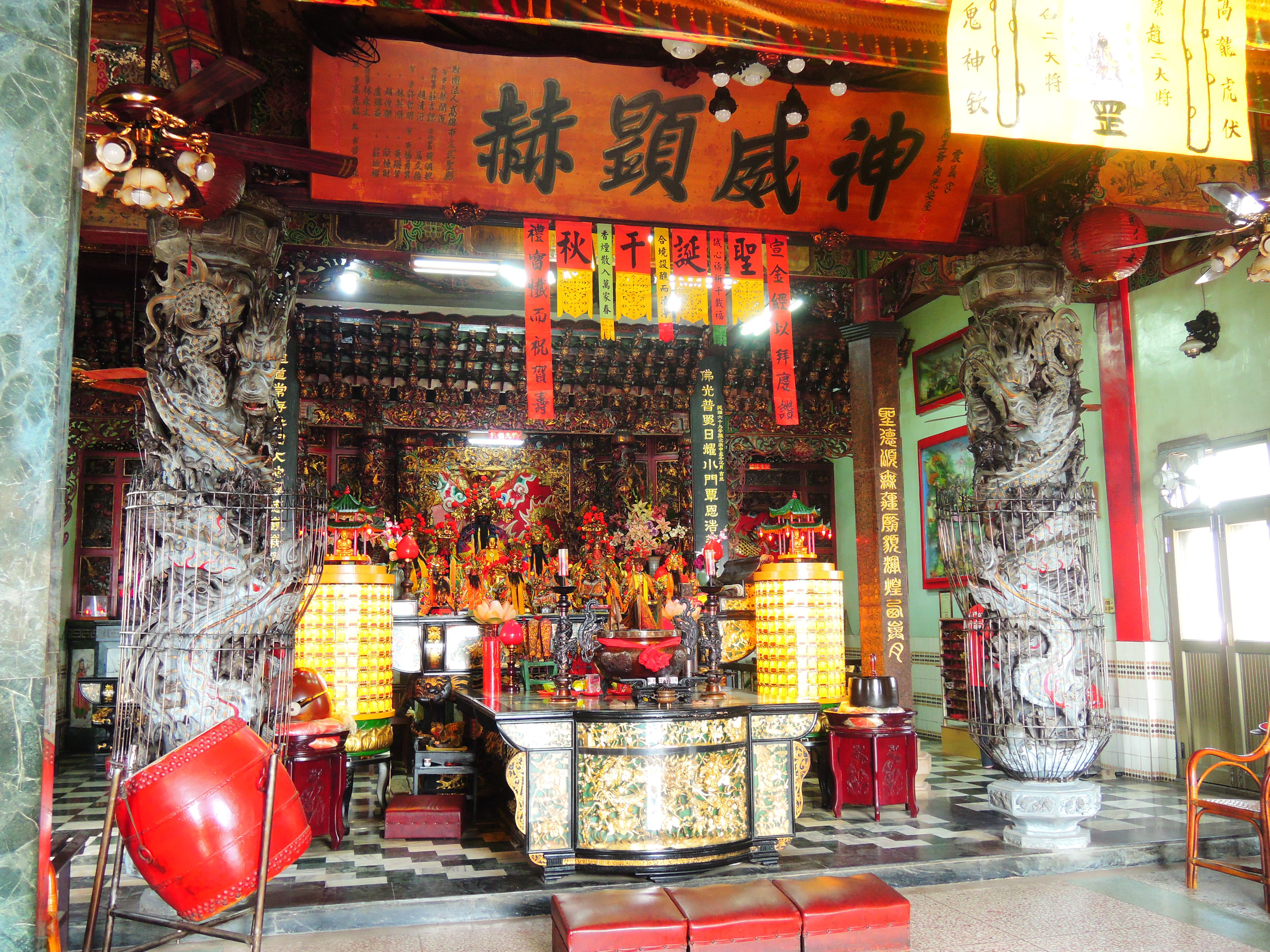
Interior of the Xiaomen Zhengyi Temple

Ceremonial Taoism focuses on ritual and devotion towards various celestial deities and spirits. The basic belief of ceremonial Taoism is that through various rites, human beings can honor the deities and these deities may then grant them with power, protection and blessings. Rituals and festivals can include chanting, offerings, and the reading of scripture. These rites are mostly performed by ritual masters who have trained extensively for this role and who may, through their mastery of ritual, intercede on behalf of laypersons.

There are various kinds of festivals in Ceremonial Taoism, including "Great Services" (chai-chiao) and Ritual Gatherings (fa-hui) that can last for days and can focus on repentance, rainmaking, disaster aversion or petitioning. There are feast days which honor specific deities. 164 Funerals and birthday blessings are a common service.

There is a complex and large pantheon in Taoism. It includes various deities classified into various ranks within an administrative structure, at the top of which are the celestial lords (t'ien-tsun). These include judges, heralds, officers, generals, clerks and messengers. The main division is between "earlier heaven" deities, who have existed since the beginning of time and "later heaven" deities, mortals who later became immortal.

146 Key earlier heaven deities include the Three Pure Ones, the Jade Emperor, the Queen Mother of the West, the Mother of the Bushel of Stars, the Seven Star Lords of the Northern Bushel and the Three Officials (Celestial, Earth, and Water). Some key later heaven deities include: Immortal Lu Tung-pin, and Emperor Kuan (Kuan-yu). Taoists may also honor local spirits and deities, as well Buddhist deities (like Guanyin, Amitabha, etc.).

The largest and most prominent sect of Ceremonial Taoism is the Way of the Celestial Masters, also known as Zhengyi Dao. The patriarch of this sect resides in Taiwan and this tradition performs numerous ceremonies which are often sponsored by the Taiwanese government. The training for Zhengyi priesthood, who are not celibate, focuses mainly on learning extensive rituals and liturgy, so that they can perform them flawlessly.

Ceremonies are practiced, to a lesser extent, in the Longmen (Dragon Gate) sect of the Quanzhen School and in the Xiantiandao sect, though these schools understand ritual as mainly a way to develop internal alchemy. During the Song dynasty, a popular form of ceremonial Taoism was the Thunder Rites (leifa), which focused on exorcism and protection.

=== Internal alchemy ===
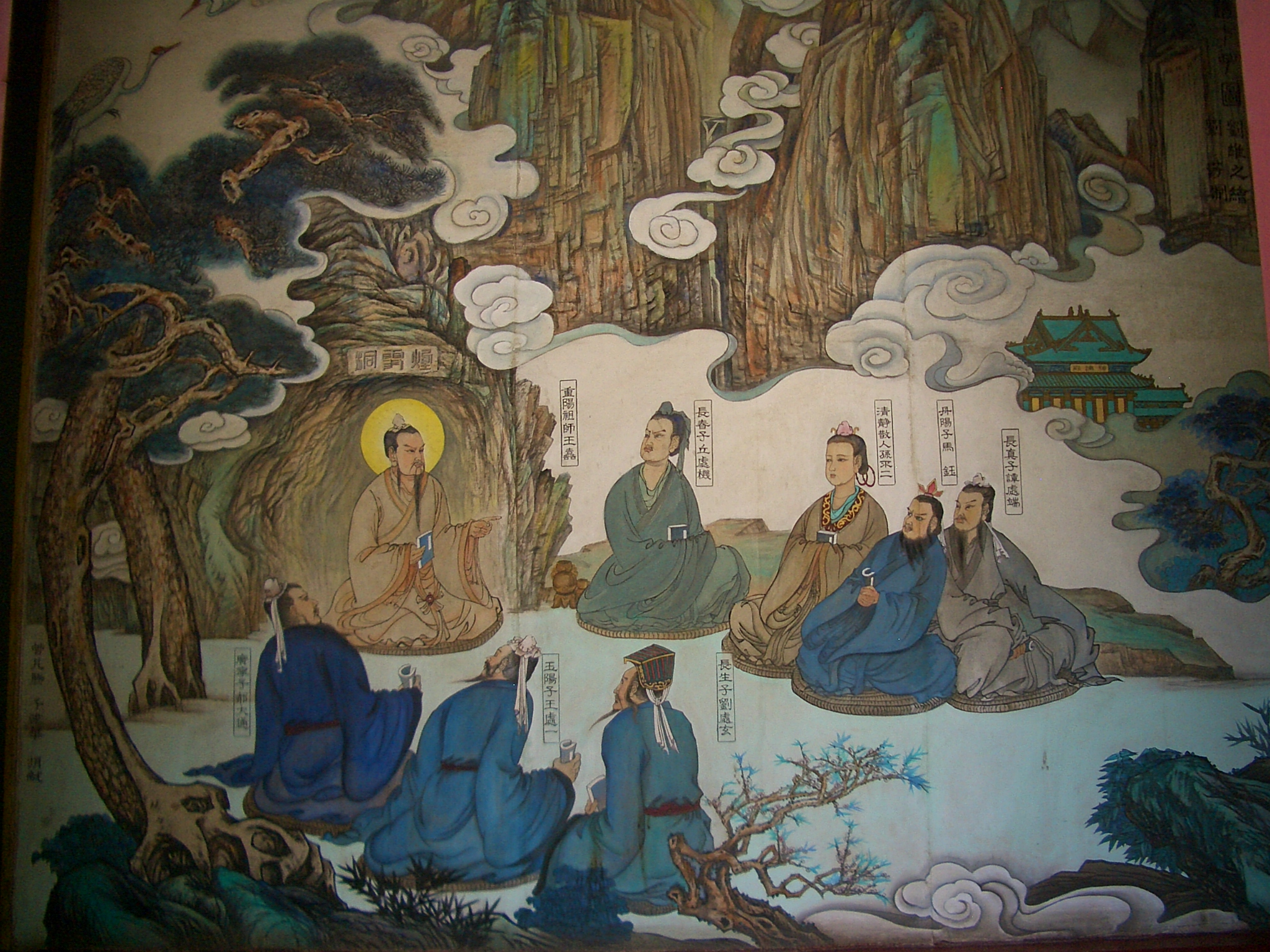
Wang Chongyang, the founder of the Quanzhen School, and his seven disciples, depicted in Changchun Temple, Wuhan.

Internal Alchemy Taoism or Transformation Taoism focuses on internal transformation through the use of various self-cultivation techniques like qigong, neidan (internal alchemy), Yangsheng and so forth.

The basic worldview of this Taoist tradition is that all beings are born with certain forms of energy (mainly the three treasures of jing, qi and shen), which become dissipated, weak and lost as we age. To prevent this and to increase our inner vital energies, one must practice various methods of "internal alchemy" (neidan) to harmonize the internal energy in one's body and refine the "golden elixir" (jindan) inside the body. These meditative inner alchemical practices are believed to lead to greater longevity and even immortality (union with the Tao at death).

Another worldview is that beings must "harmonize yin and yang forces internally to achieve immortality." A term used by some Taoists that sums up traditions that do not use these practices is "singular path". Most traditions follow the "singular path". These include the Longmen (Dragon Gate) sect of the Quanzhen School, the Xiantiandao (Earlier Heaven Way) sect, the Wuliupai sect, and the Wudang quan sect.

The Quanzhen School was founded by Wang Chongyang (1112–1170), a hermit in the Zhongnan mountains who was said in legends to have met and learned secret methods from two immortals: Lu Dongbin and Zhongli Quan. He then moved to Shandong and preached his teachings, founding various religious communities. His school popularized Internal Alchemy Taoism and the usage of the term.

One of his "seven perfected" disciples, Qiu Chuji (1148–1227), founded the Dragon Gate lineage. Chuji was also made the leader of all religions in China by Genghis Khan, making his tradition the most powerful in all of China, and contributing to Longmen's lasting influence. Another important Quanzhen lineage is the Qingjing pai, founded by the nun Sun Bu'er (1119–1182), the only female member of the "seven perfected". Today, Quanzhen is mainly made up of celibate monastics who practice vegetarianism, sobriety, internal alchemy and recite daily liturgies. The largest lineage is Dragon Gate Taoism.

Much like Taoists who see writings made by influential members of their faith as having a divine nature, some Taoists view self-cultivation as a way for emotions and self to partake in divinity, and a smaller subset of these view some mythological beings such as xian as being divine. Xian were viewed in many lights and as completely different types of beings over different times and in different places. They were sometimes viewed as deities, parts of the celestial hierarchy, metaphorical ideals that people should strive to be like, reclusive Taoist masters who know how to control and harness spiritual energies or shamans.

==== Hygiene Taoism ====
Hygiene Taoism is a Taoist tradition meant to increase life and "physical and mental harmony". Some Taoists from the "Hygiene School" believed that they could survive only on their own breath and saliva to purify their bodies.

Much of Taoism in general is about cleanliness in some way and involves free thinking, as well as rejecting the gratification of the senses, in order to purify oneself to make the mind like "the sky", "sun", and nature in general.

=== Karmic Taoism ===
Karmic Taoism, or "Action and Karma Taoism", according to Wong, focuses on ethics and is grounded in the idea that the sacred celestial powers aid and reward those who do good and punish those who do evil. This tradition can be traced back to Song dynasty Taoist Li Ying-chang and his Laozu Treatise on the Response of the Tao (T'ai-shang kan-ying p'ien). Li sparked a popular movement which focused on the everyday life of ordinary persons instead of on temples, monasteries and sages. At the core of this tradition is living in harmony with the Tao and with the Way of Heaven, which means acting with benevolence, kindness and compassion. Doing evil is considered a transgression against the way and this evil will be punished by deities, celestial ministers and judges.

These ideas are quite ancient, the Taiping Jing (Scripture of Great Peace) states: "accumulate good deeds, and prosperity will come to you from the Tao". Besides wealth and prosperity, Karmic Taoism also believes that doing good increases longevity, while doing evil decreases it. Another common idea in this group of Taoist traditions is that there deities, like the Kitchen Lord, who monitor our actions and report to Heaven and the Jade Emperor (who tallies them and metes out punishment and reward).

Karmic Taoism is a nonsectarian tradition adopted by many Taoist sects. The Laozu Treatise on the Response of the Tao is studied in Quanzhen Taoism, Hsien-t'ien Tao and in the Wu-Liu sect. All major schools of Taoism view ethics as the foundation for spirituality. Furthermore, there are those who are not affiliated with a Taoist sect who may still follow Karmic Taoism in daily life.

==== Religious Taoism ====
Some Taoist sects are expressly religious in the Western sense. "Lord Heaven" and "Jade Emperor" were terms for a Taoist supreme deity also used in Confucianism and Chinese folk religion, and some conceptions of this deity thought of the two names as synonymous.

The Taoist Jade Emperor in the first millennium AD was a primary deity among polytheists who had a heaven that contained numerous ministries and officials and which was "modelled on...the earthly emperor['s rule]".

Polytheist Taoists venerated one or more of these kinds of spiritual entities: "deified heroes...forces of nature" and "nature spirits", xian, spirits, gods, devas and other celestial beings from Chinese Buddhism, Indian Buddhism, and Chinese folk religion, various kinds of beings occupying heaven, members of the celestial bureaucracy, ghosts, "mythical emperors", Laozi, a trinity of high gods that varied in how it was thought of, and the Three Pure Ones. Some Taoists chose not to worship beings they saw as gods, and only worshipped guardian spirits or "celestials", such as devas, various kinds of beings occupying heaven, members of the celestial bureaucracy, and xian. In some Taoist sects, the Tao was the primary thing that was venerated and beings that would be gods in other sects were merely treated as supernatural beings similar to gods who could only act in accordance with the Tao's wishes.

When the Tao Te Ching was written, many Taoists told stories and legends about heroes "whose bodies had been rendered invulnerable". This could be achieved by making contact with "dragon's blood" or a river in the afterlife, or drinking the "waters of the 'Well of Life' and eating the 'fungus of immortality'".

Ordinary Chinese in the early Tang dynasty often worshipped local gods, Buddhist gods and devas, and Taoist gods simultaneously, and this population included a significant amount of the Taoists who have ever worshipped devas throughout history.

The trinity is thought by scholars to have evolved into the Three Pure Ones. It was thought of in the early Han dynasty as the three gods Tianyi, Diyi, and "the Taiyi". These beings were varyingly interpreted as relatively simple heavenly, earthly, and all-purpose gods respectively, the "supreme deity" (an intangible god that represented the mind of the Tao), "his disciple", the Lord Tao (a more physical god representing the Tao), and Lord Lao (Laozi "deified"), or an emanation of the Tao that was ultimately singular in nature.

An unrelated trinity was the Three Great Emperor-Officials, three of the highest shen in some branches of religious Taoism thought to be able to pardon sins.

The Tao was not worshipped alone, although gods do exist that anthropomorphize it in various ways. Laozi was sometimes thought to be a god or "the image of the Tao".

"Some Taoist adepts" worshipped thousands of gods that were thought to exist in the body.

== See also ==
=== History and politics ===
- History of Taoism
- List of Taoist states and dynasties

=== Schools and organizations ===
- Hong Kong Taoist Association
- Yao Taoism
- Zhengyi Taoism

=== Concepts and objects ===
- Fulu
- Jiaobei
- Ten precepts
- Pu
- Taoist coin charm
- Zhizha
- Qi
- Wu wei
- Yin and yang

=== Practice ===
- Taoist diet
- Taoist music
- Taoist Tai Chi

=== Deities ===
- Three Pure Ones
- Four heavenly ministers
- Three Sovereigns and Five Emperors

=== Texts ===
- Tao Zang
- Qingjing Jing

=== Regional Taoism ===
==== China ====
- Chinese culture
- Chinese gods and immortals
- Chinese ritual mastery traditions
- Chinese spiritual world concepts
- Taoism and Confucianism
- Taoism in Hong Kong

==== Japan ====
- Taoism in Japan
- Onmyōdō
- Onmyōji

==== Korea ====
- Taoism in Korea
- Taegeuk

==== Southeast Asia ====
- Taoism in Malaysia
- Taoism in Singapore
- Taoism in Vietnam

==== Europe ====
- Taoist Church of Italy
