= High priest =

Supreme priest in several religions

The term "high priest" usually refers either to an individual who holds the office of ruler-priest, or to one who is the head of a religious organisation.

== Ancient Egypt ==
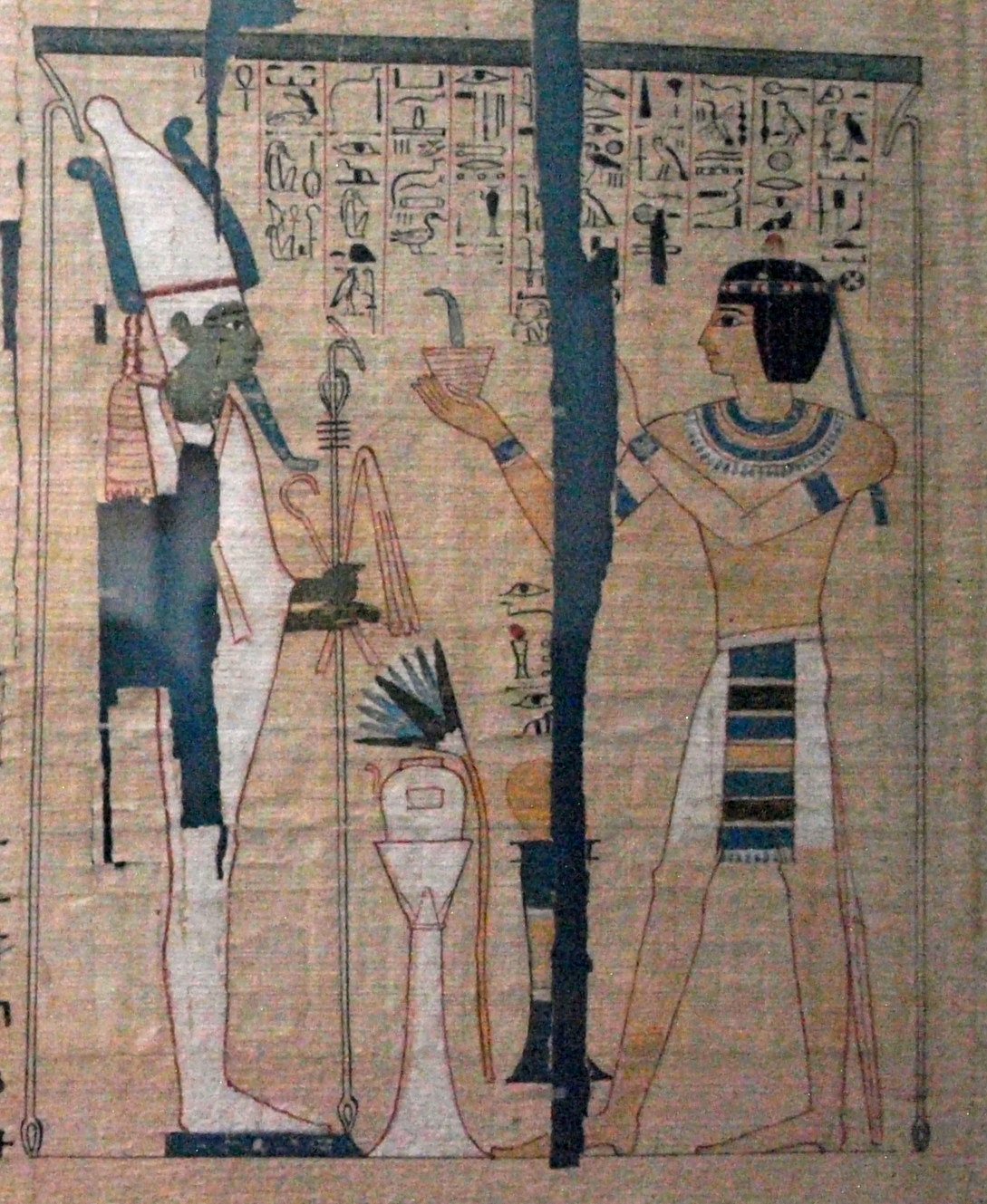
Pinedjem II as High Priest of Amun in Thebes. From his Book of the Dead

In ancient Egypt, a high priest was the chief priest of any of the many gods revered by the Egyptians.

- While not regarded as a dynasty, the High Priest of Amun at Thebes, Egypt were nevertheless of such power and influence that they were effectively the rulers of Upper Egypt from 1080 to c. 943 BCE
- High Priest of Osiris. The main cult of Osiris was in Abydos, Egypt.
- High Priest of Ptah. The main cult of Ptah was in Memphis, Egypt.
- High Priest of Ra. The main cult of Ra was in Heliopolis.
- God's Wife of Amun – the highest-ranking priestess of the Amun cult

== Ancient Israel ==
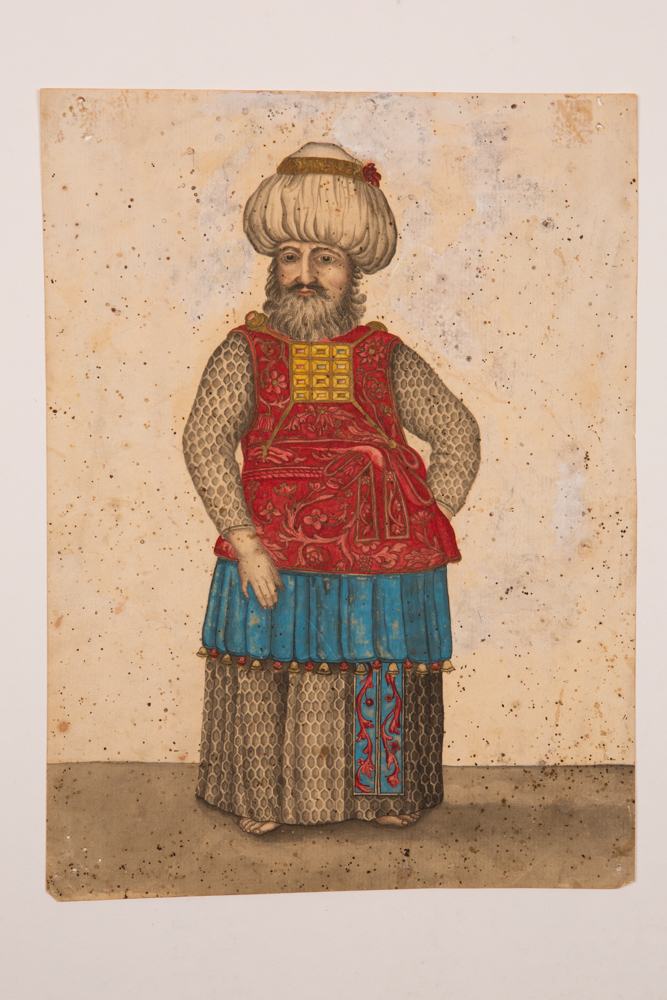
Depiction of a high priest in biblical costume, end of the 17th century, orientalising representation with turban, in the collection of the Jewish Museum of Switzerland

The High Priest of Israel served in the Tabernacle, then in Solomon's Temple and the Second Temple in Jerusalem. The Samaritan High Priest is the high priest of the Samaritans.

== Ancient world ==
- Archiereus, title of a high priest from Ancient Greece
- Dastur, a Zoroastrian high priest
- Hierophant, the chief priest of the Eleusinian Mysteries
- NIN (cuneiform) or EN (cuneiform), a high priest or priestess of a city-state's patron-deity in Sumer
- Pontifex maximus from Ancient Rome
- Pythia, high priestess of the Temple of Apollo (Delphi)

== China ==
- Zhang Lu was the third generation of Celestial Masters lineage from Zhang Daoling, was a high priest and appointed as General of the Household Who Guards Civilians (鎮民中郎將) and the Administrator of Hanning (漢寧太守) by imperial government.
- Kou Qianzhi (365–448) was conferred as the high priest or Tian Shi by Emperor Taiwu of Northern Wei, which eventually established The Northern Celestial Masters.

== India ==
- Vidyaranya was a high priest in the Vijayanagara Empire.
- Panditrao was a title of the appointed high priest that sat on the Council of 8 (Ashta Pradhan) in the early Maratha Empire.
- The title of high priest is used in the Śvētāmbara sect of Jainism.

== Christianity ==
The Epistle to the Hebrews refers to Jesus as high priest.

Christian usage refers to Jesus Christ as the only high priest: for example, in Catholic teaching, he is described as "high priest of the new and eternal covenant". Jesus' prayer as recorded in John 17 was called the precatio summi sacerdotis or "prayer of the high priest" by the Lutheran theologian David Chytraeus and earlier Church Fathers used similar terminology to refer to Jesus and his prayer in this chapter.

A high priest could sometimes be compared to the Pope in the Catholic Church, to a patriarch in the Oriental Orthodox Churches, the Church of the East and the Eastern Orthodox Churches (the Ecumenical Patriarch of Constantinople is a primus inter pares) or to a primate in the Anglican Communion (the Archbishop of Canterbury is a primus inter pares). Throughout the episcopal body, in the Anglican and Lutheran communions, bishops may also be referred to as high priests, since they share in or are considered earthly instruments of the high priesthood of Jesus Christ.

High priest is an office of the priesthood within the Melchizedek priesthood in most denominations of the Latter Day Saint movement.

== Mandaeism ==
A high priest in Mandaeism is known as a ganzibra. The head of all of the high priests within a Mandaean community is known as a rishama.

== Other religions ==
- The Celestial Masters was founded by Zhang Daoling in 142 CE, they have been the high priests and spiritual leaders in Zhengyi Order of Taoism until present days. The 63rd Celestial Master, Zhang En Pu eventually migrated to Taiwan in 1949.
- The 16th-century Maya priesthood was headed by a high priest who instructed the other priests and advised the king.
- Kahuna Nui, presides over the temple or heiau. Below the Kahuna Nui are various types and ranks of priests.
- In Nichiren Shoshu Buddhism, the High Priest is considered to be successor to Nichiren, through the lineage of Nikko Shonin.
- The Dalai Lama is the head of the Gelug school of Tibetan Buddhism.
- Chief Rabbi is the title given in several countries to the recognized religious leader of that country's Jewish community, or to a rabbinic leader appointed by the local secular authorities. Since 1911 Israel has had two chief rabbis, one Ashkenazi and one Sephardi.
- In Shinto, a high priest, called a Guji, is usually the highest-ranking priest (Kannushi) in a shrine.
- Grand Mufti is the title for the leading Islamic jurist of a country, typically Sunni, who may oversee other muftis.
- The Grand Imam of al-Azhar is considered, by most Muslims, to be the highest authority in Sunni Islamic thought and Islamic jurisprudence and holds great influence on followers of the theological Ash'ari and Maturidi traditions worldwide.
- In Ásatrú, the high priest is called a goði (or gyða) and is the leader of a small group of practitioners collectively referred to as a Kindred. The goði are collectively known as the goðar. Some countries use the term Allsherjargoði for national multi-kindred organizations, most notably Iceland's.
- In both the Yoruba religion and a number of its various New World sects, such as Santeria, a high priest is called a Babalawo. The term means wise man, and comes from the Yoruba language of West Africa. A female holder of the title is known as an Iyanifa.
- In Wicca, High Priest and High Priestess are the roles of the man and woman who are leading a group ritual. High Priest and High Priestess are also titles sometimes conferred on the members of a Wiccan coven when they have completed their third, or fifth year of study and practice. Sometimes called Third degree, depending on path or tradition.
- The High Priest and High Priestess are the two highest positions of leadership and administration within the Church of Satan.
- In some Rodnover organisations in Russia, the volkhv is the title used for the high priest, or priests in higher ranks.
- In Tio religion (in the Republic of Congo), the Lipie acted as the Tio Kingdom's high priest.

== Non-religious usages ==
The phrase is also often used to describe someone who is deemed to be an innovator or leader in a field of achievement. For example, an 1893 publication describes ancient Greek playwright Aristophanes as having been "the high-priest of comedy".

== See also ==
- Neal Boortz often refers to himself on air as the "High Priest of the Church of the Painful Truth".
- The High Priestess is the second trump or Major Arcana card in most traditional Tarot decks.
- In Royal Arch Masonry the Excellent High Priest serves as leader of the chapter.
- Singer Nina Simone is often referred to as the High Priestess of Soul.
