= Taoist Libationers =

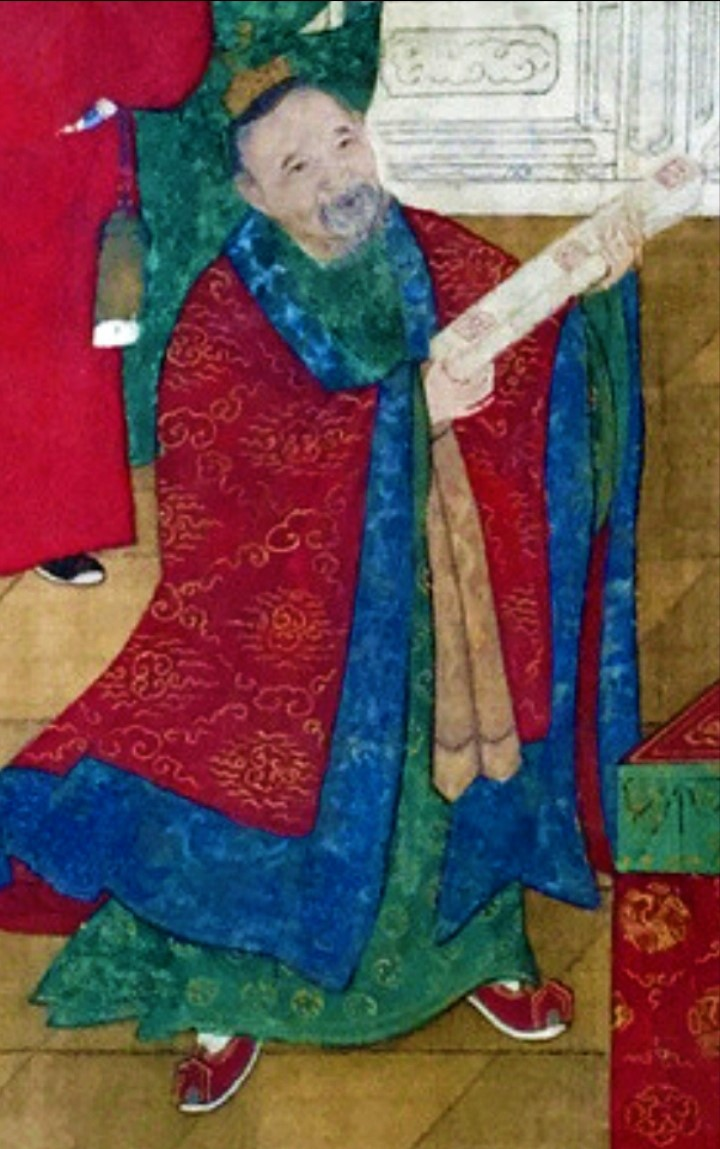
Shao Yuanjie, a Taoist priest to Jiajing Emperor of mid-Ming dynasty. Libationers served as the precursor to Taoist priests

Taoist Libationers (祭酒) were the primary religious professionals within the Way of the Celestial Masters. They served numerous roles within the early Taoist movement, chiefly of which was leading parishes. Evidence of libationers can be found as early as 173 C.E. Beginning in the 5th century the term libationer was phased out in favor of calling them Taoist Priests (道士), However, the term libationer was still used into the Southern Song dynasty and both terms denote the same position,

== History ==
=== Early Libationer ===
The first historical records of libationers compare them to local leaders or county prefects. The title at first was a vague one with its meaning being fluid, It was originally a title given to local elders who were tasked with offering sacrifices during seasonal villages operations. Some accounts use the label of libationer to name all senior true believer of the church. By the Han dynasty the Term had evolved from not only the master of ceremony at local religious festivals but also one that meant an official rank within the Way of the Celestial Masters. Originally Libationers were appointed on the basis of merit however by the Han dynasty the appointment turned into a hereditary one passed down from family to family.

=== Taoist Diaspora ===
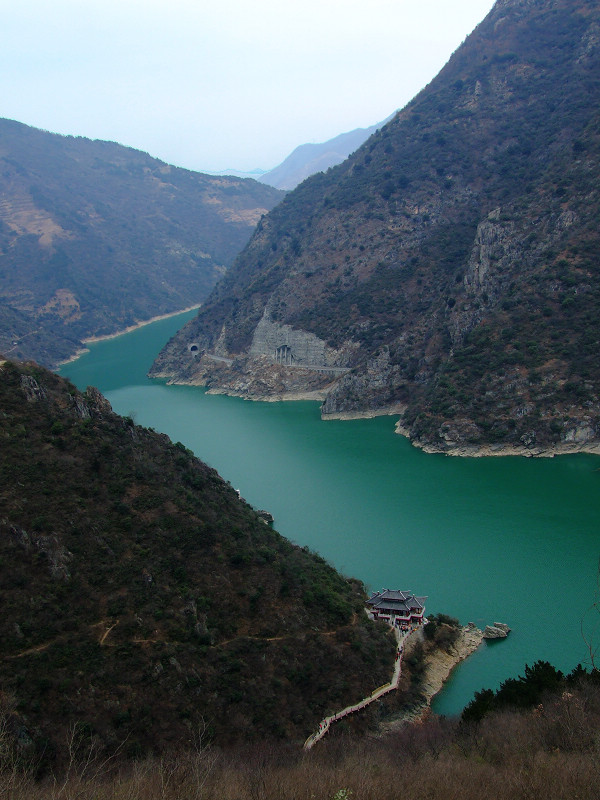
Hanzhong the original home of the Way of the Celestial Masters

The Celestial Master Community within the valley of Han Zhong was very active in the later half of the 2nd century. Zhang Lu ruled over his community utilizing his libationors to spread teachings and help rule. Zhang Lu's political success can be in part attributed to his administrative organization and the use of libationer as not only religious leaders but also civil servants. In 215 C.E. the repeated conflicts between the early Celestial Master community and the Han dynasty came to a head with war between the two. This resulted with the forces of Zhang Lu (Han dynasty) being defeated by those of Cao Cao. After surrenders to Cao Cao's forces the Celestial Master community spread out from Hanzhong to the rest of China. While fleeing north Zhang Lu's forces brought with them not only the Way of the Celestial Master but also libationers and their ritual practices. This event lead to the spread of Taoism throughout China. The displacement of the early Celestial Master community made the role of Libationer even more important as they became most peoples link to the Tao.

== Education ==
The key requirement to become a Libationer for the Way of the Celestial Master was the receipt of the register of 150 generals. Registers were written on long un-dyed pieces of silk and were gained by libationers when they accepted the precepts. These registers served dual roles of verifying ones role within the church and displaying it for all to see. the One Hundred Fifty Generals Register was the ultimate on to attain that marked ones entrance to the role of libationer and allowed one to become the master of households. Access to some levees such as the Levee for Direction and Instruction were reserved for the students of libationers known as register pupils.

== Duties ==
As the primary professionals within the church Libationers had a vast array of duties. By the 4th century C.E. the Church of the Celestial Master had organized Libationers into a clear hierarchy. This was done by parish, parish office, and by register. To be appointed to a parish a Libationer would be required to attract names and families into their flock. This helped them gain merit within the church and then promotion. The libationer's job would be to perform rituals and ceremonies for those within their parish. The convenience of having a libationer come to the household directly helped them grow their parishes. Despite the convenience that Libationers presented to their flock the process of evangelizing the profane required these families to forsake the gods that they have been worshiping for generations. The liabtioner's role to their parishioners was to help them with any and all problems. Once having heard their problems the Libationer would suggest a response which could range from the performance of rituals, moral exhortations, or penance. Reflection on ones own moral failings was a common theme within early Celestial Master teachings which was why penance was often a suggested solution to ones issues.

=== The Parish System ===
The Parish system was the basis for the bureaucracy and hierarchy of the Way of the Celestial Master. A parish would include 24 different offices with clearly defined duties. The number 24 was chosen to represent the 24 energies of the year. The number of members within a libationer's parish dictated a great number of factors such as the number of clerks they would be able to retain. Allowing larger Parishes to have bigger staff of aids and novices.

Overseer of heaven: Placed in charge of correcting disorder such as hearsay.

Controller of Parish: Duty was to investigate parishes or Libationers if issues arise.

Contributor of Pneumas Their duty was to select new male and female officers who would then undergo rigorous inspection.

Great Director of Attacks: In charge of the talisman temples of local hamlets.

Supervisor of Merit: In charge of rewarding the merit of the various deities.

Director of Merit: An administrative role In charge of merit and keeping track of various donations and expenditures within the parish.

Supervisor of Deities: Determines the worth and purity of those seeking promotion. Promotes and demotes accordingly.

Overseer of Deities: In charge of taking statements and investigating offenses that have been committed.

Supervisor of Appointments: In charge of rewarding the name merit and making appointments to the posts of the parish.
Investigator of Pneumas: In charge of investigating the pneumas of the four quadrants.

Equalizer of Pneumas: Primary role was inquiries into the various pneumas of the realm. This role also involved equalizing the phenomena of the four quadrants and eight extremities of space.

Submitter of Pneumas: In charge of distinguishing the true pneumas from deviant spirits as well as the collection of myriad demons.

Director of Pneumas: Charged with overseeing requests for healing and rescue and the three assemblies.

Solemn Decorum: In charge of ritual enforcement including but not limited to; clothing, seating order, appearance, and rules.

Supervisor of Pneumas: Tasked with knowing the timings and divination of the five colored pneumas.*

Supervisor of Determinations: Tasked with dealing with spirit men and women possessed with the pnuema and transmit words.

Four Pneumas: In charge of documents provided by the parish. Tasked with recording the dead and newly born.

Circulator of Deities: Tasked with distribution of pneuamas and the spread the conversion of the teachings of the Tao

Pneuma of the Tao: Tasked with converting the violent and evil to the virtuous and good.

Pneuma of the Sage: In charge of awarding merits at the end of the year through investigating documents.

Receiver of Penumas: In charge of recording notations of merit and receiving the records of healing within the parish.

Regulator of Pneumas: Tasked with the regulation and precedence of the various posts.

Equalizer of Integrity: In charge of the investigation into integrity and deviance within the parish. Also tasked with equalizing food and drink.

Circulator of teachings: Tasked with the promotion of the master's teachings with the goal of converting the profane and foolish.

Establisher of Righteousness: In charge of dealing with listing merit and endeavor and aiding those who may be losing ground.

*Most Taoist literature only includes 24 parish offices. The office that is usually left out is that of the Supervisor of Pneumas

=== Petitions ===
The most important duty of Libationers of the Way of the Celestial Masters was the submitting of petitions (章) the Heavenly Bureaus. To be able to craft a petition required large amounts of expertise and years of schooling. When writing a petition Libationers utilized both their technical knowledge of writing the document and to what gods it would go to but also their understanding of the parishioners to find the root cause of their troubles. A large focus of these petitions would be the relationship between the living and the dead.

=== Medical Treatment ===
Main Article: Taoist Medicine

Libationers played a large role in the treatment of ailments as they were responsible for the needs of their parishioners. Sickness was not seen as only a physical problem but also a metaphysical and moral one. The treatment of the sick went hand in hand with the enforcement of moral norms. The ill were expected to retreat to "chambers of quietude" where they were later visited by a libationer who would begin treatment. The libationer would lead a ritual called the "controlling of the evil." This involved a communal recitation of the "Text in Five Thousand Words." After this recitation the patient would be expected to confess sins where then the libationer and their aids would write a petition. These confessions would be copied three times the first of which was sent to the Sovereign of Heaven. This was accomplished by placing the petition on top of a mountain. The second copy of the confession was buried deep into the ground to reach the Sovereign of Earth. The third and final copy was sent to the Sovereign of the Waters by sinking it into a river. This practice of confession was adopted from a similar Buddhist one, however, the Taoists differentiated themselves through the bureaucratic procedures they added such as petitions.

=== Death ===
Main Article: Taoism and death

There are no evidence of Taoist Burials until at least the 5th century C.E. This can be attributed to Taoism being a largely aniconic movement up until this time. An important aspect of the Way of the Celestial Masters was the idea of celestial rebirth. To achieve rebirth within the celestial realm libationers would place the five tablets of the "Perfect Text in Cinnabar Writing" on tables according to the five directions (energies). This would be accompanied by a large offering of valuable goods such as gold, silk, and various cast dragons.

== See also ==
- Zhang Daoling
- Way of the Celestial Masters
- Taoism
- Religion in China
