= Way of the Five Pecks of Rice =

Chinese Taoist movement founded in 142 CE

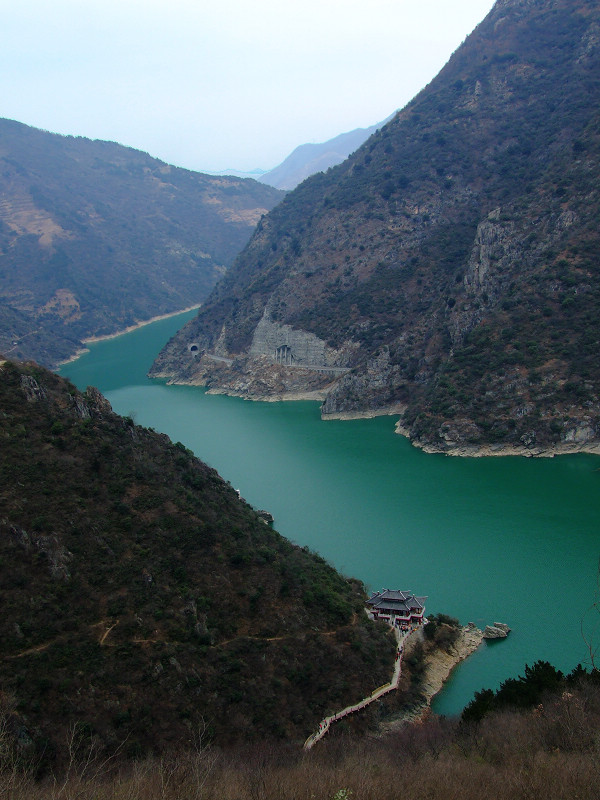
The Hanzhong valley, the location of the Celestial Masters' state

The Way of the Five Pecks of Rice (Chinese: 五斗米道; pinyin: Wǔ Dǒu Mǐ Dào) or the Way of the Celestial Master, commonly abbreviated to simply The Celestial Masters, was a Chinese Taoist movement founded by the first Celestial Master, Zhang Daoling, in 142 CE. At its height, the movement controlled Hanning (漢寧), a theocratic state centered in the Hanzhong valley, north of Sichuan. In 215 CE, the state was incorporated by Cao Cao into what would later be the Kingdom of Wei, and the followers of the Celestial Master were dispersed all over China.

The Celestial Masters believed that qi pervaded everything, and in order to achieve immortality, the correct balance of qi had to be present within the body. Having a poor quantity of qi in the body would result in illness, and eventually death. Meditation could be used to restore qi to the body, but sex was to be avoided, as it could result in the loss of qi. If there was the correct balance of qi within the body upon death, an adherent could 'feign death' and be reborn. If not, an adherent would be transported to an earthly prison where he would face eternal torment.

The Hanzhong state was divided into 24 regions which were each led by an official. Each district had a civil register which recorded people's names and ranks. Three times a year, the registers were updated at the same time as an important feast. While a child's rank rose automatically, adults had to raise their own rank through religious achievement or marriage. Higher ranked people had more divine generals at their command, which could be used to fight demons that caused bad luck or disease. The state had a system of law that encouraged confession and benevolence rather than strict punishment. Criminals were asked to confess their crimes and meditate, and were given public work to do as a sentence. Few texts written by the Hanzhong Celestial Masters survive, with the most important being the Xiang'er commentary to the Dao De Jing. While the Hanzhong state lasted for only twenty-five years, its beliefs influenced all subsequent Daoist movements.

== History ==
In 142 CE, Zhang Daoling announced that Laozi had appeared to him and commanded him to rid the world of decadence and establish a new state consisting only of the "chosen people". Zhang became the first Celestial Master, and began to spread his newly founded movement throughout the province of Sichuan. The movement was initially called the Way of the Five Pecks of Rice, because each person wishing to join was required to donate five pecks of rice (actually five dǒu, equal to 13.6 US gallons or 5.9 pecks). The movement spread rapidly, particularly under his son Zhang Heng (Chinese: 張衡) and grandson Zhang Lu. The Zhangs were able to convert many groups to their cause, such as the Bandun Man (belonging to the Ba people), which strengthened their movement. In 184, Zhang Xiu (張脩, not related to Zhang Lu) rebelled against the Han dynasty. In 191, Zhang Lu and Zhang Xiu were sent to conquer the Hanzhong valley, just north of Sichuan, which was under Su Gu (蘇固) control. During the subsequent battle, Zhang Xiu was killed, and Zhang Lu founded the theocratic state of Zhanghan, enjoying full independence.

In 215, the warlord Cao Cao attacked the Hanzhong state, and forced Zhang Lu to flee to Eastern Sichuan, where he later surrendered. Zhang was given a title and land, as were several other family members and generals. His followers were forced to resettle in other parts of China, with one group being sent to the Chang'an area, and another being sent to Luoyang. Zhang and his family relocated to Cao Cao's administrative headquarters in Ye, located in today's Hebei and Henan provinces. He then used his own popularity as a religious leader to lend legitimacy to the Wei, proclaiming that the Wei court had inherited divine authority from the Daoist church, as well as from Confucian laws. Shortly after the surrender, Zhang Lu died and was succeeded by his son, Fu. After this point there are few historical sources until 255 CE, when a text indicates that the Celestial Master community was fragmenting as a result of the political turmoil within the Wei Kingdom

The collapse of the Kingdom of Wei in 266 CE, along with the fall of Northern China to the Huns in 317, further scattered adherents to the Celestial Master. The Celestial Masters later reemerged in the 4th and 5th centuries as two distinct offshoots, the Northern and Southern Celestial Masters.

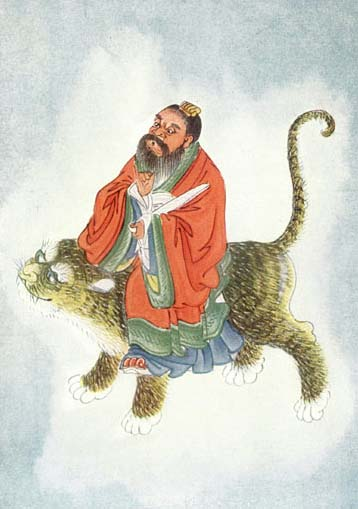
Zhang Daoling, the first Celestial Master

== Texts ==
The only significant Celestial Master text that survives from the Hanzhong period is the Xiang'er commentary to the Dao De Jing. This text gives insight into the Celestial Masters' physiological beliefs, meditation practices and rituals. In addition, the commentary reinterprets the Dao De Jing to have all of humanity as its intended audience, instead of only a sage. The Taiping Jing, a text attributed to the Yellow Turbans, was not a Celestial Master text, but reflects at least in part some Celestial Master thought and practice. A later text written in 255 CE, known as the Commands and Admonitions for the Families of the Great Dao was composed to a divided Celestial Master community after the dispersal of the Hanzhong population. While written in the persona of Zhang Lu, it is probable that this text was not written by him, as he had probably died by 255 CE.

== Beliefs and practices ==
The Celestial Masters believed that there was an upcoming apocalypse that would nearly destroy humanity. Only 18,000 adherents of the Celestial Master who had the right balance of qi would survive the disaster. These were the seed people that would repopulate the earth after the destruction.

=== Qi ===
The foundation of Celestial Master belief is that there is an energy source known as qi, that is born from the Dao and is the source of life. The human body contains spirits that need to be nourished by the proper balance of qi. There are three types of qi: yin qi, yang qi and blended qi, which is a mix of yin and yang qi. The goal of a Daoist is to achieve transcendence to a higher plane. In order to do this, they must preserve and harmonize their internal spirits. Only through meditation that guides qi correctly throughout the body, can the spirits be harmonized correctly. While it is known that the Celestial Masters meditated in order to obtain qi, there is no surviving evidence that describes their meditation practices.

=== Immortality ===
One common goal of early Daoism was to extend life by achieving immortality. The Celestial Masters believed that in order to achieve immortality, one was not supposed to extend life in the current world, but rather 'feign death' in this world, and be reborn on the other side. In order to feign death, an adept had to have perfectly harmonized internal spirits. When someone with refined internal spirits died in this world, their spirit would venture to the Palace of Grand Darkness where their form would be refined and then reborn in a perfected state on the other side. There are no surviving texts that describe what kind of place the 'other side' was. Those that failed to harmonize their internal spirits prior to death would be reborn in the underground earth-prisons, where they would be subject to eternal torment and toil.

=== Illness ===
In the Hanzhong community, everyone was regarded as ill in some way. This was because sin caused qi to leave the body, and qi was necessary for life. In order to cure any illness, repentance was a crucial factor in ensuring that the loss of qi could be staunched. Repentance could be accomplished by spending time in a 'Chamber of Silence,' and reflecting on one's sins, or by beating one's breasts and kowtowing to heaven. Illness could be cured in other ways as well, such as using medicinal herbs and by listening to ritual music. Eating very little was also of extreme importance, and an ideal diet would consist of no food at all, but only of non-corporeal things such as air, which the person could absorb through meditation.

=== Sexuality ===
Practising correct sexual practices was one method of perfecting the body's internal spirits. The Celestial Masters believed that semen is the embodiment of qi. If someone ejaculated too often, their life would be shortened. In fact, the Xiang'er indicates that people should not even have sex for the purposes of reproduction. The Celestial Masters frowned upon the practice of heqi (合氣 'The Union of the Breaths') or huanjing bunao (還精補腦 'returning the semen/essence to replenish the brain'), and advocated non-ejaculation simply as a way to avoid losing qi. In addition, the Celestial Masters thought that the method of stealing a woman's qi to replenish the man's own qi was completely wrong, and should not be practised. Despite their opposition to 'heqi' and reproductive sex, there is the possibility that the Celestial Masters supported sex for purposes other than reproduction, and a Celestial Master text from around the 5th century describes an elaborate sexual ritual. Marc Kalinowski wrote a full description of the ritual in 1985.

== Organization ==
The region governed by the Celestial Masters was divided into 24 regions for both administrative and religious reasons. Each of these 24 regions were connected with one of the Five Phases, one of the 24 periods of the year and with one of the 28 constellations of the zodiac. Depending on their birth signs, each adherent belonged to one of these districts. Each of the 24 regions was administered by 24 officials, who had under their command 240 armies of spirits, composed of 2400 generals, 2400 officers and 240000 soldiers. This system of administration reflected the utopian system of governance described in the Zhouli.

Administration and religion were closely linked in the system of the Celestial Masters. Adherents were grouped by families, and each was attached to a district. Families and districts, and the gods all held copies of civil registers. The registers were detailed records of the people, and recorded each person's rank, identity and location. Any changes to those registered had to be accompanied by a monetary contribution known as a 'wage of faith.' Requests to the gods followed a bureaucratic model, and were drawn up according to specific administrative codes. The effectiveness of these requests depended upon the accuracy of the registers kept by the gods.

New members of the sect were divided into groups led by instructors. Neophytes were instructed by a catechism similar to that found in the Xiang'er that was likely a type of proto-meditation that later became widespread in movements such as the Shangqing School of Daoism. These instructors handled religious and administrative duties, receiving taxes, and set up road-side inns for travellers.

The rank of each person was determined by how many divine generals they had at their disposal, and by the number of divine scriptures they had obtained. These divine generals were used to fight wandering demons that could bring misfortune or illness on someone. A person received their first general at the age of six years, and in subsequent ceremonies would be given more and generals and achieve a higher ranking until a full complement was achieved at the age of nineteen. Marriage would unite two sets of generals, thus giving a couple use of 150 divine generals. After marriage, further increases in ranking could only be achieved by religious achievement.

On certain dates of the year, such as the equinoxes, group ceremonies took place at which masters disseminated their teachings. During these ceremonies, communal feasts often took place, where food was eaten and offered to the gods. The feasts also took place when a birth or death occurred, or in order to bring happiness and prevent evil. The participants in such a feast were organized based on their religious standing, with merit and seniority being the determining factors. During the three important dates known as Sanyuan, the most important feasts were held. During these thrice-annual feasts, a census would be taken recording births, deaths and peoples' movements. At this time, adherents were also expected to donate the five pecks of rice that gives the movement its name.

== Law ==
In the Hanzhong state, sin and criminal behavior were not differentiated. In order to eliminate sin, an adherent first had to acknowledge his crime, and then would have to go to a "quiet room" to meditate. There, he would have to write three confessions which would be offered to the Lord of Heaven, the Lord of Earth and the Lord of Water. For public crimes, an accused would be pardoned three times for his actions and then be sentenced. A sentence depended on the type of crime, but always involved community service. For a minor crime, the sentence was usually to repair a road. A repeat offender might be asked to donate building materials to improve local buildings. Other laws banned alcohol and prohibited the killing of animals during the spring and summer.

== Legacy ==
The belief and practices of the Hanzhong Celestial Masters had a profound legacy upon future Daoist belief. The movement marked a significant change from earlier, philosophical Daoist movements. No longer was Daoism a philosophical pastime for the literate and wealthy; it was now promoted to all classes of society, including the illiterate and the non-Chinese. In addition, the Celestial Masters were the first Daoist group to form an organized priesthood that helped spread their beliefs. Being the first organized religious Daoists, the first Celestial Masters are the ancestors of all subsequent Daoist movements such as the Shangqing and Lingbao movements, as well as the medieval Zhengyi Daoists, who claimed affinity to the first Celestial Masters.

== See also ==
- Xiang'er
- Zhang Daoling
- Zhang Lu
- Zhengyi Dao

== Bibliography ==
- Bokenkamp, Stephen (1997). Early Daoist Scriptures. Berkeley: University of California.
- Hendrischke, Barbara (2000). "Early Daoist Movements". In Kohn, Livia (ed.). Daoism Handbook. Leiden: Brill. pp. 134–164.
- Kalinowski, Marc (1985). "La transmission du dispositif des neufs palais sous les six-dynasties". In Strickmann, Michel (ed.). Tantric and Taoist Studies (in French). Brussels: Institut belges hautes etudes chinoises. pp. 773–811.
- Kleeman, Terry (1998). Great Perfection: Religion and Ethnicity in a Chinese Millennial Kingdom. Honolulu: University of Hawaii.
- Kohn, Livia (2000). "The Northern Celestial Masters". In Kohn, Livia (ed.). Daoism Handbook. Leiden: Brill. pp. 283–308.
- Nickerson, Peter (2000). "The Southern Celestial Masters". In Kohn, Livia (ed.). Daoism Handbook. Leiden: Brill. pp. 256–282.
- Penny, Benjamin (2000). "Immortality and Transcendence". In Kohn, Livia (ed.). Daoism Handbook. Leiden: Brill. pp. 109–133.
- Robinet, Isabelle (1997). Daoism: Growth of a Religion. Stanford: Stanford University.
- Tsuchiya, Masaaki (2002). "Confessions of Sins and Awareness of Self in the Taipingjing". In Kohn, Livia; Roth, Harold (eds.). Daoist Identity: History, Lineage and Ritual. Honolulu: University of Hawaii. pp. 20–52.
