= Shangqing, Jiangxi =

Shangqing 上清镇
- Town
- Location in Jiangxi Shangqing (China)
- Coordinates: 28°02′45″N 117°02′04″E
- Country: People's Republic of China
- Province: Jiangxi
- Prefecture-level city: Yingtan
- County-level city: Guixi
- Time zone: UTC+8 (China Standard)

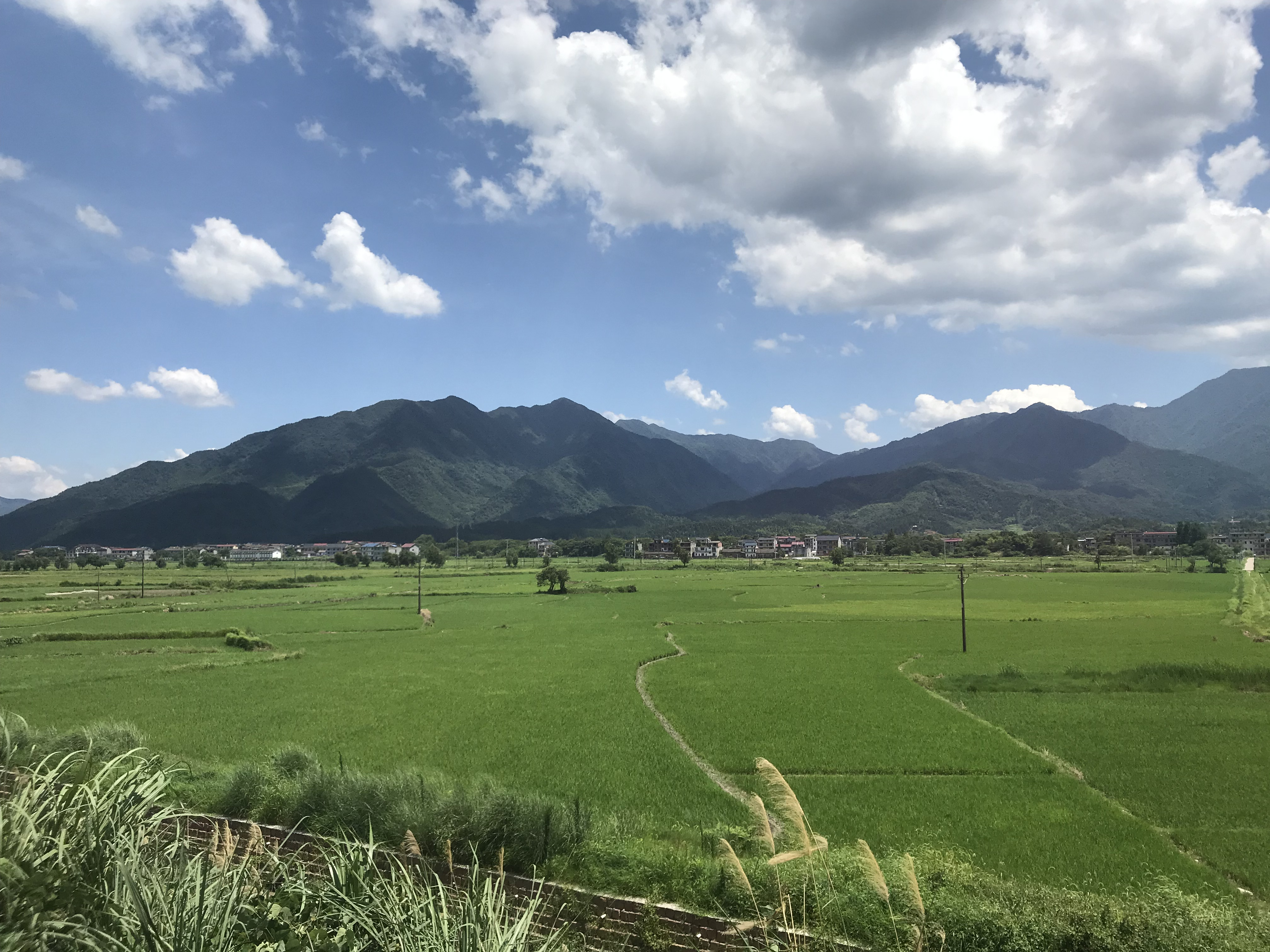
Mountains in Shangqing

Shangqing (Chinese: 上清; pinyin: Shàngqīng) is a town under the county-level city of Guixi, in the municipal region of Yingtan, Jiangxi. As of 2018, it has 10 villages under its administration.

It is a small stop on a major railroad - the Fuzhou branch line from the Yingtan junction on the Nanchang—Shanghai line. Most visitors will be touring the nearby Mount Longhu, a Daoist holy mountain.

== Cultural interest ==
Shangqing features Han dynasty temples associated with Zhang Daoling, a founder of Daoism. The town is mentioned in the beginning of the classic Yuan dynasty novel Water Margin.

== See also ==
- Shangqing School
