= Guixi =

Guixi 贵溪市 Guiqi, Kweiki
- County-level city
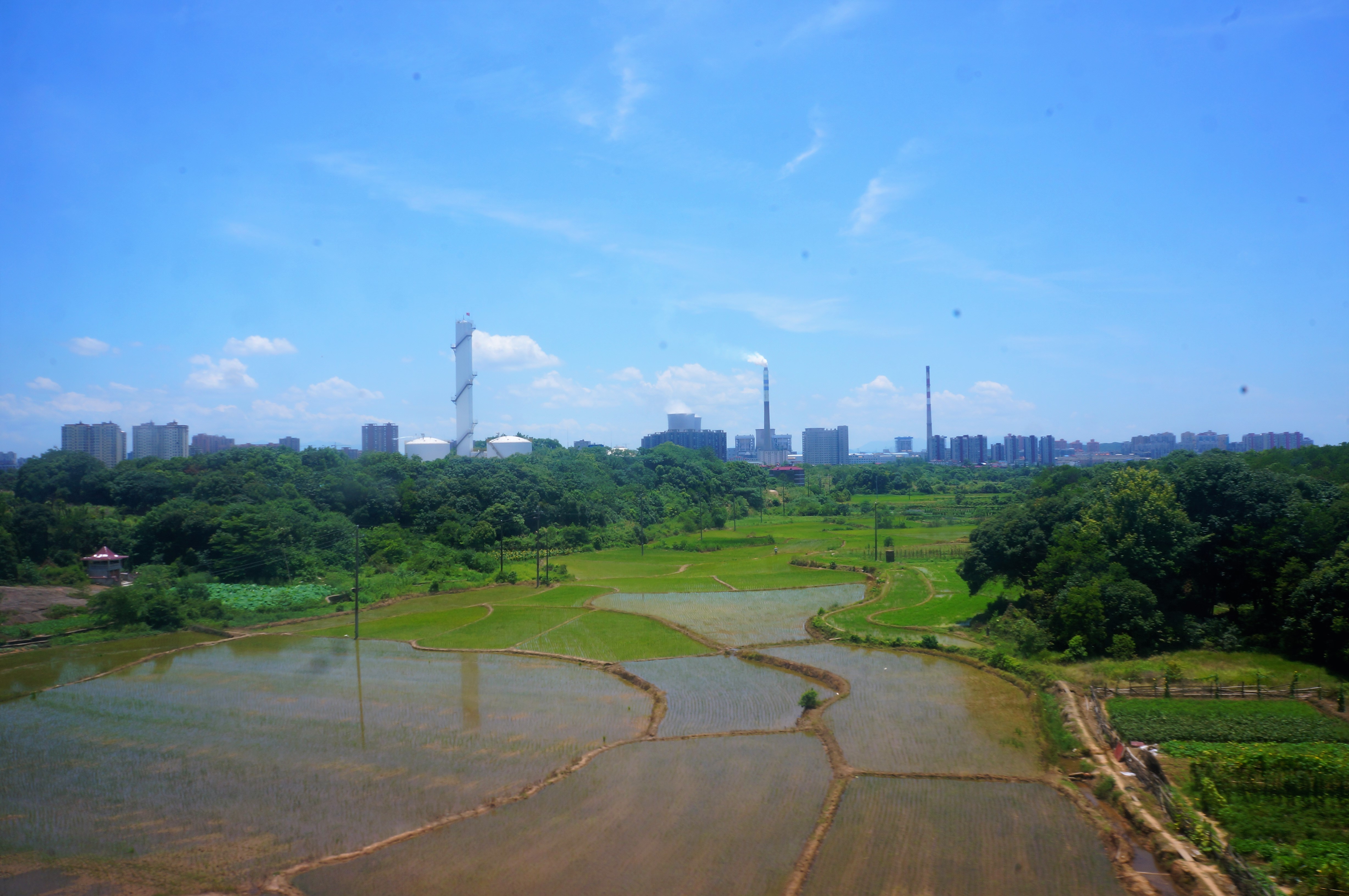

- Location in Jiangxi
- Coordinates: 28°17′33″N 117°14′43″E
- Country: People's Republic of China
- Province: Jiangxi
- Prefecture-level city: Yingtan

Area
  - Total: 2,480 km^{2} (960 sq mi)

Population (2018)
  - Total: 640,000
  - Density: 260/km^{2} (670/sq mi)
- Postal Code: 335400

Guixi (simplified Chinese: 贵溪; traditional Chinese: 貴溪; lit. 'Noble Creek') is a county-level city under the jurisdiction of the prefecture-level city of Yingtan, Jiangxi Province, China, bordering Fujian Province to the southeast.

The city covers two-thirds of the land area in the municipal region. Like Yuehu District, the prefectural seat, Guixi's centre Xiongshi lies on the Xin River (信江).

== Administration ==
The city executive, legislature and judiciary are in Xiongshi Subdistricts (雄石街道), together with the CPC and PSB branches.

In the present, Guixi City has 3 subdistricts, 13 towns, 6 townships and 1 ethnic township.

=== 3 Subdistricts (街道, jie dao) ===
- Huayuan (花园街道)
- Xiongshi (雄石街道)
- Dongmen (东门街道)

=== 13 Towns (镇, zhen) ===
- Zhoufang (周坊)
- Sili (泗沥)
- Hongtang (鸿塘)
- Zhiguang (志光)
- Hetan (河潭)
- Liukou (流口)
- Luohe (罗河)
- Jintun (金屯)
- Tangwan (塘湾)
- Wenfang (文坊)
- Lengshui (冷水)
- Longhushan (龙虎山) - access to Longhushan Mountain
- Shangqing (上清) - access to Longhushan Mt.
- Former Taqiao Town (塔桥) - is merged to the other

=== 6 Townships (乡, xiang) ===
- Binjiang (滨江乡)
- Baitian (白田乡)
- Leixi (雷溪乡)
- Pengwan (彭湾乡)
- Erkou (耳口乡)
- Yujia (余家乡)

=== 1 Ethnic Township (民族乡, min zu xiang) ===
- She Zhangping Township (漳坪畲族乡)

== Climate ==
Climate data for Guixi, elevation 61 m (200 ft), (1991–2020 normals, extremes 1981–2010)
Month	Jan	Feb	Mar	Apr	May	Jun	Jul	Aug	Sep	Oct	Nov	Dec	Year
Record high °C (°F)	25.3 (77.5)	29.8 (85.6)	35.1 (95.2)	35.7 (96.3)	37.3 (99.1)	37.9 (100.2)	40.4 (104.7)	41.1 (106.0)	38.4 (101.1)	38.1 (100.6)	33.1 (91.6)	25.0 (77.0)	41.1 (106.0)
Mean daily maximum °C (°F)	10.5 (50.9)	13.6 (56.5)	17.4 (63.3)	23.7 (74.7)	28.2 (82.8)	30.6 (87.1)	34.7 (94.5)	34.1 (93.4)	30.5 (86.9)	25.6 (78.1)	19.4 (66.9)	13.2 (55.8)	23.5 (74.2)
Daily mean °C (°F)	6.7 (44.1)	9.2 (48.6)	12.9 (55.2)	18.8 (65.8)	23.5 (74.3)	26.4 (79.5)	30.0 (86.0)	29.3 (84.7)	25.9 (78.6)	20.7 (69.3)	14.7 (58.5)	8.8 (47.8)	18.9 (66.0)
Mean daily minimum °C (°F)	4.1 (39.4)	6.2 (43.2)	9.7 (49.5)	15.1 (59.2)	19.9 (67.8)	23.2 (73.8)	26.2 (79.2)	25.7 (78.3)	22.4 (72.3)	17.1 (62.8)	11.3 (52.3)	5.6 (42.1)	15.5 (60.0)
Record low °C (°F)	−4.2 (24.4)	−4.4 (24.1)	−0.8 (30.6)	4.5 (40.1)	10.7 (51.3)	14.5 (58.1)	19.9 (67.8)	20.3 (68.5)	14.8 (58.6)	4.3 (39.7)	0.4 (32.7)	−9.3 (15.3)	−9.3 (15.3)
Average precipitation mm (inches)	91.9 (3.62)	111.3 (4.38)	220.0 (8.66)	241.5 (9.51)	271.5 (10.69)	410.4 (16.16)	177.3 (6.98)	161.7 (6.37)	77.6 (3.06)	47.6 (1.87)	105.3 (4.15)	74.8 (2.94)	1,990.9 (78.39)
Average precipitation days (≥ 0.1 mm)	14.3	13.8	18.5	17.3	16.6	17.5	11.5	12.5	8.7	7.9	10.1	10.8	159.5
Average snowy days	1.9	1.3	0.2	0	0	0	0	0	0	0	0	0.8	4.2
Average relative humidity (%)	79	77	79	77	77	80	73	75	75	72	76	76	76
Mean monthly sunshine hours	76.6	81.3	88.2	115.5	135.2	125.9	223.2	206.2	172.1	157.1	125.3	115.4	1,622
Percentage possible sunshine	23	26	24	30	32	30	53	51	47	45	39	36	36
Source: China Meteorological Administration

== Transportation ==
=== Rail ===
Guixi is a railroad junction for the Anhui–Jiangxi and the Zhejiang-Jiangxi Railways.
