= Xishengjing =

5th century Taoist text

The Xishengjing (Chinese: 西昇經; pinyin: Xīshēngjīng; Wade–Giles: Hsi Sheng Ching; lit. 'Scripture of Western Ascension') is a late 5th century CE Taoist text with provenance at the Louguan 樓觀 "Tiered Abbey" of The Northern Celestial Masters. According to Daoist tradition, Louguan (the eastern terminus of the ancient Silk Road, west of the capital Chang'an) was near where the legendary Laozi 老子 transmitted the Tao Te Ching to the Guardian of the Pass Yin Xi 尹喜. The Xishengjing allegedly records the Taoist principles that Laozi taught Yin Xi before he departed west to India.

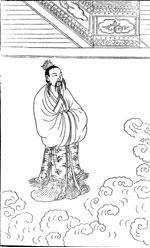
Yin Xi, from a Ming dynasty edition Liexian Zhuan

The Daozang "Taoist Canon" contains two Song dynasty editions (CT 726 and 666), the Xishengjing jizhu 西昇經集注 "Collected Commentaries to the Scripture of Western Ascension" by Chen Jingyuan 陳景元 (d. 1094 CE, see Huashu), and the Xishengjing by Emperor Huizong 徽宗 (r. 1100–1125 CE). The original date of the Xishengjing is uncertain, and is estimated at "late 5th century" (Kohn 2007:1114) or "6th century" (Komjathy 2004:52).

The Xishengjing is also known under two variant titles. Laojun xishengjing 老君西昇經 "Lord Lao's Scripture of Western Ascension" includes the supposed author's honorific name. Xishengji 西升記 "Record of Western Ascension" uses the usual Chinese character sheng 升 "rise; hoist; ascend" instead of its variant sheng 昇 (with 日 "sun" above) and replaces jing "classic" with ji "record; remember; note".

The Xishengjing is textually affiliated with the Huahujing "Classic on Converting the Barbarians", which purportedly records Laozi's travels into India where he founded Buddhism. Chinese Buddhists strongly refuted such claims that Laozi became Gautama Buddha and argued that both texts were forgeries.

The received Xishengjing text has 39 sections in 5 parts, described by Livia Kohn.

First, it establishes the general setting, narrates the background story, outlines Yin Xi's practice, and discusses some fundamental problems of talking about the ineffable and transmitting the mysterious. Next, the inherence of the Tao in the world is described together with an outline of the way in which the adept can make this inherence practically useful to himself or herself. A more concrete explanation of the theory and practice, including meditation instruction, is given in the third part. The fourth part deals with the results of the practice and with the way of living a sagely life in the world. The fifth and last part is about "returning" (fan 反); it describes the ultimate return of everything to its origin, and explains the death of the physical body as a recovery of a more subtle form of participation in the Tao. (2007:1114)

For example, the first part of the Xisheng jing begins,

1. Western Ascension Laozi ascended to the west to open up the Tao in India. He was called Master Gu; skilled at entering nonaction, Without beginning or end, he exists continuously. Thus steadily ascending, he followed his way and reached the frontier. The guardian of the Pass, Yin Xi, saw his [sagely] qi. He purified himself and waited upon the guest, who in turn transmitted Tao and virtue to him. He arranged it in two sections. [He said]: I'll tell you the essentials of the Tao: Tao is naturalness. Who practices can attain [it]. Who hears can speak [about it]. Who knows does not speak; who speaks does not know. Language is formed when sounds are exchanged. Thus in conversation, words make sense. When one does not know the Tao, words create confusion. Therefore I don't hear, don't speak; I don't know why things are. It can be compared to the knowledge of musical sound. One becomes conscious of it by plucking a string. Though the mind may know the appropriate sounds, yet the mouth is unable to formulate them. Similarly Tao is deep, subtle, wondrous; who knows it does not speak. On the other hand, one may be conscious of musical sounds, sad melodies. One then dampens the sounds to consider them within. Then when the mind makes the mouth speak, one speaks but does not know. (tr. Kohn 1991:223–224)

This "Master Gu" translates Gu Xiansheng 古先生 "Old Master", which is the literal meaning of Laozi.
