= Zhang Guoxiang =

Daoist Celestial Master

Zhang Guoxiang (Chinese: 张国祥) was the fiftieth Celestial Master, who was the head of the Daoist Zhengyi School based at Longhu Shan in China's Jiangxi province.

== Life ==
Zhang Yongxu, the fiftieth Celestial Master, designated Zhang Guoxiang, his nephew, as successor due to the premature death of his son. The Ming court led by the Longqing Emperor (1567–72) did not look favourably upon the Zhengyi Taoists, and stripped Zhang Guoxiang of his title. The Wanli Emperor (1573–1620), however, was more favorably inclined towards the Zhengyi School, and restored Zhang Guoxiang's title. Zhang spent thirteen years in Nanjing, where he got married, and was given a residence by the emperor. In 1607, the emperor ordered Zhang to compile a supplement to the Taoist Canon that was to include important texts written during the emperor's reign and was known as the Wanli Xu Daozang (Supplementary Taoist Canon of the Wanli Reign Period). Misfortune fell upon Zhang in 1609, when a flood destroyed the main temple at Longhu Shan. The emperor supplied finances to assist in the temple's restoration, but Zhang died before completion in 1611.
