= Zhang Sicheng =

Chinese Taoist Celestial Master of Zhengyi Dao

Zhang Sicheng (died c. 1344) was the thirty-ninth Taoist Celestial Master of Zhengyi Dao, known for his calligraphy. He presumably flourished during the Yuan Dynasty.

Zhang assumed the title of Celestial Master after the death of his father, Zhang Yucai. It is not known whether Zhang Sicheng, like his father, also painted dragons. Sicheng oversaw three major Taoist ordination centers and Taoist affairs south of the Yangtze. In 1331 he inscribed a colophon poem on the Nine Dragons scroll painting by Chen Rong.
