= Huahujing =

Historical Taoist text

- Traditional Chinese: 化胡經
- Simplified Chinese: 化胡经
- Literal meaning: Classic on converting the barbarians
Transcriptions
Standard Mandarin
- Hanyu Pinyin: Huàhújīng
- Wade–Giles: Hua^{4} Hu^{2} Ching^{1}
- IPA: [xwâxǔtɕíŋ]
Middle Chinese
- Middle Chinese: hˠua^{H} ɦuo keŋ

The Huahujing (also romanized as Hua Hu Ching) is a Taoist work, traditionally attributed to Laozi. No extant versions exist today apart from quotations in a partial manuscript discovered in the Mogao Caves, Dunhuang, in China.

== Origins ==
The work is honorifically known as the Taishang lingbao Laozi huahu miaojing (太上靈寶老子化胡妙經, "The Supreme Numinous Treasure's Sublime Classic on Laozi's Conversion of the Barbarians").

Traditionally, it is said that Laozi wrote it with the intention of converting Buddhists to Taoism, when they began to cross over from India. The Taoists are sometimes claimed to have developed the Huahujing to support one of their favourite arguments against the Buddhists: that after leaving China to the West, Laozi had travelled as far as India, where he had converted—or even become—the Buddha and thus Buddhism had been created as a somewhat distorted offshoot of Taoism.

Some scholars believe it is a forgery because there are no historical references to it until the early 4th century CE. It has been suggested that the Taoist Wang Fu (王浮) may have originally compiled the Huahujing circa 300 CE.

== Destruction of copies ==
In 705, the Emperor Zhongzong of Tang prohibited distribution of the text.

Emperors of China occasionally organized debates between Buddhists and Taoists, and granted political favor to the winners. The Mongol Khan Mongke ordered all copies to be destroyed in the 13th century after Taoists lost a debate with Buddhists.

== Dunhuang manuscript ==
Parts of chapters 1, 2, 8 and 10 have been discovered among the Dunhuang manuscripts, recovered from the Mogao Caves near Dunhuang and preserved in the Taisho Tripitaka, manuscript 2139.

Estimated dates for the manuscript range from around the late 4th or early 5th century to the 6th century CE Northern Celestial Masters.

Its contents have no direct relation to later oral texts produced in English.
