= Xiang'er =

Commentary on the Daodejing

The Xiang'er (simplified Chinese: 想尔; traditional Chinese: 想爾; pinyin: Xiǎng'ěr; Wade–Giles: Hsiang^{3}-erh^{3}) is a commentary to the Daodejing that is best known for being one of the earliest surviving texts from the Way of the Celestial Master variant of Daoism. The meaning of the title is debated, but can be translated as 'thinking of you'.

== History ==
The Xiang'er was likely written between 190 and 220 CE, a time when the Celestial Masters controlled a theocratic state in Sichuan. Early sources indicate that the text was written by Zhang Lu, the third Celestial Master and grandson to Zhang Daoling, founder of the sect.

The text available to us today was discovered in the Buddhist Mogao caves at Dunhuang in the early 20th century and was part of the trove that traveled to London along with Aurel Stein. However, the Xiang'er that survives only comments upon 3rd through 37th chapters of the Daodejing. Presumably there was also a second part of the Xiang'er, but it has now been lost. The Xiang'er text found at Dunhuang likely dates from the 5th or 6th centuries.

== Precepts ==
The Xiang'er reveals a great deal about early Celestial Master thought and practice. In particular, the text offers advice to individuals and to society as a whole.

In terms of individual advice, the Xiang'er, like many later strands of Daoism, discusses ways in which a person could gain immortality (importantly, immortality is not a significant topic in the Daodejing itself). According to the Xiang'er, the body was inhabited by spirits that survive in the presence of qi. In order to attain immortality, a person had to preserve and nourish these internal spirits. Presumably these spirits could be nurtured through meditation, but the Xiang'er offers very little guidance on what type of meditation one should practice. The Xiang'er also looks down upon Daoist sexual practices, and urges its readers not to practice them.

While aimed at a wide and demotic audience, the Xiang'er also contains advice that could be used for rulers. These rulers were encouraged to remake society on the model of the Daoism. Such a society would not be based on desire for wealth and fame, but on the fear and the respect of heaven. Hopefully, when people learn to be respectful and fearful towards heaven, they will act morally.
