= Kou Qianzhi =

Taoist leader (365–448)

Kou Qianzhi (Chinese: 寇謙之; pinyin: Kòu Qiānzhī; Wade–Giles: K'ou Ch'ien-chih) (365–448) was a Taoist reformer who reenvisioned many of the ceremonies and rites of the Way of the Celestial Master form of Taoism and reformulated its theology into a new movement known as The Northern Celestial Masters. His influence was such that he had Taoism established as the official state religion of the Northern Wei dynasty (386–535); this act, however, embroiled Taoism in long and often bloody factional political struggles. There is a tradition that Kou Qianzhi once sought seclusion on Mount Hua the better to practice his Taoist meditations.

== Life ==
Kou apparently began his career as a Taoist physician and hygienist. But in 415 he had a vision: a spirit appeared before him and told him that since the death of Zhang Daoling, the great founder of the Way of the Celestial Master ("Tradition of the Celestial Master of the Mighty Commonwealth of Orthodox Oneness") sect of Taoism, the sect had been corrupted by false doctrines. Kou was awarded Zhang Daoling's old title of tianshi ("celestial master") and was charged in the vision with eliminating excesses in Taoist rituals. Accordingly, Kou began to attempt to curb the orgiastic practices and mercenary spirit that had become associated with Taoist rites and to place greater emphasis on hygienic ritual and good works.

Kou gained many adherents and, by making Taoism into a more orthodox doctrine, attracted the attention of Emperor Taiwu of Northern Wei. In 423 Kou had the title of tianshi conferred upon himself by Imperial decree, thereby establishing the "Taoist papacy": the title was passed to the church's leader from generation to generation in an unbroken line. By conspiring with certain court officials, Kou's patron Cui Hao was able to have Buddhism, Taoism's chief competitor, proscribed from the realm and all its practitioners subjected to a bloody persecution. Taoism then became the official religion of the Northern Wei Dynasty.

But Kou's efforts were only temporarily effective: Buddhism soon returned to north China, after the deaths of Cui Hao and Emperor Taiwu and the accession of Taiwu's devoutly Buddhist grandson Emperor Wencheng. Moreover, because orgiastic Taoist rites were still noted as late as the Tang dynasty, many observers view his reforms as transitory.

Kou Qianzhi was the leader of the Celestial Masters north branch.

Celestial Masters north branch under Kou Qianzhi worshipped divinities described in the 魏書 Book of Wei. Yin Xi and the Elder Lord are absent from the Celestial Masters of Kou Qianzhi.

An anti Buddhist plan was concocted by the Celestial Masters under Kou Qianzhi along with Cui Hao under the Taiwu Emperor. The Celestial Masters of the north urged the persecution of Buddhists under the Taiwu Emperor in the Northern Wei, attacking Buddhism and the Buddha as wicked and as anti stability and anti family. Anti Buddhism was the position of Kou Qianzhi. There was no ban on the Celestial Masters despite the nofullfilment of Cui Hao and Kou Qianzhi's agenda in their anti Buddhist campaign.
