= Zhengyi Dao =

Major school of Taoism

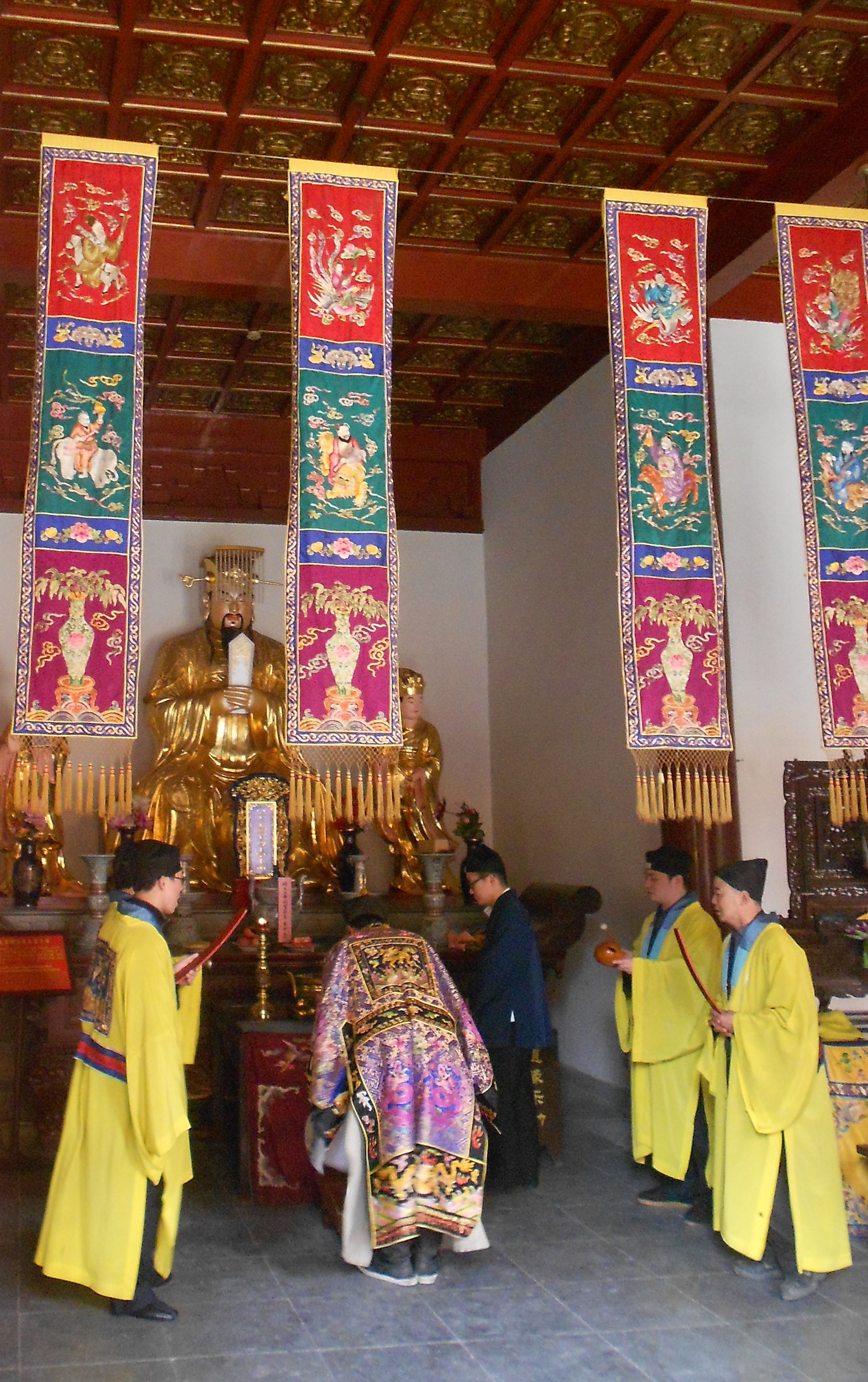
A rite to worship the Jade Emperor at the Qinciyangdian, the focal temple of the Zhengyi school in Shanghai.

Zhengyi Dao (Chinese: 正一道; pinyin: Zhèng Yī Dào), also known as the Way of Orthodox Unity, Teaching of the Orthodox Unity, and Branch of the Orthodox Unity is a Chinese Taoist movement that traditionally refers to the same Taoist lineage as the Way of the Five Pecks of Rice and Way of the Celestial Masters, but in the period of the Tang dynasty and its history thereafter. Like the Way of Celestial Masters (Tianshi Dao), the leader of Zhengyi Taoism was known as the Celestial Master.

It is currently one of the two dominant denominations of Daoism in China (the other being the Quanzhen School or "Complete Reality")

== Name ==
The term Zhengyi (Orthodox Unity) has been used since Taoism became an organized religion in 142 AD when Taishang Laojun bestowed the Covenant with the Powers of Orthodox Unity (zhengyi mengwei) on Zhang Daoling. Zhang's followers called his teachings the Way of the Five Pecks of Rice while during the Six Dynasties period, the Southern Taoists called it the Way of the Celestial Masters. The Covenant, Five Pecks of Rice, and Celestial Masters all refer to the Zhengyi branch of Taoism but in different periods.

== History ==
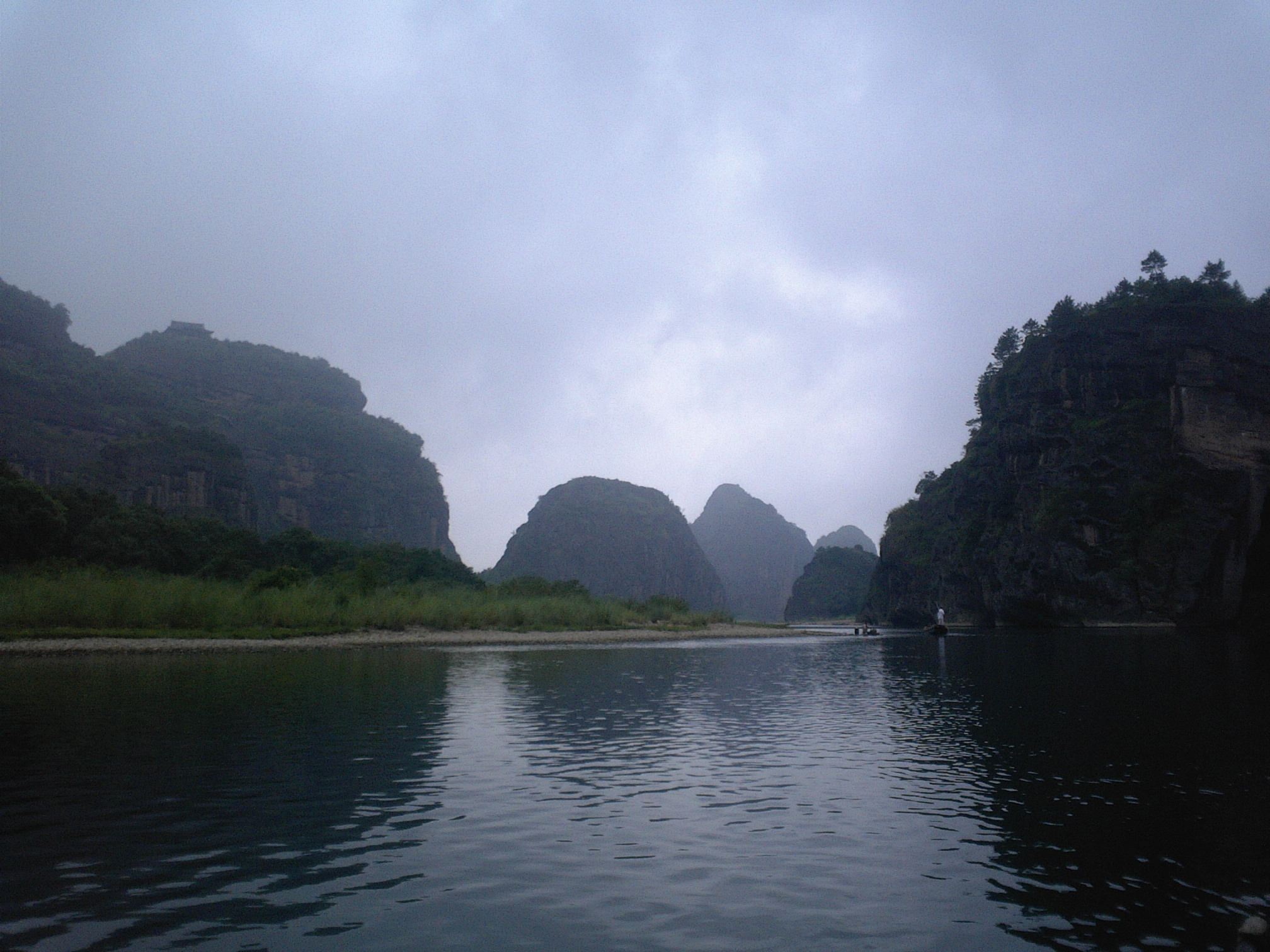
Longhu Shan, the headquarters of the Zhengyi Daoists, in Jiangxi, China

=== Post-Han decline ===
Celestial Master communities suffered from numerous migrations in the late Three Kingdoms and Five Dynasties and Ten Kingdoms periods. Cao Cao resettled them in the north, and then they joined mass migrations to the south after the loss of Northern China in 317 to the Uprising of the Five Barbarians. In the 5th century Abridged Codes for the Taoist Community, Lu Xiujing laments that Taoist Assemblies no longer observed the proper rules, and the position of libationer had become hereditary. By the Tang dynasty, the title of Celestial Master had been debased to the point where any prominent Taoist could claim the title. Celestial Master priests no longer figured prominently in Taoist texts.

=== Mount Longhu ===
Emperor Xuanzong (712-756) canonized the first Celestial Master Zhang Daoling during his reign. This brought no benefit to the original base of the Celestial Masters in Sichuan, but rather benefited a temple in the Jiangnan area of Jiangxi province. This temple was located at Mount Longhu, claimed to be the spot where Zhang Daoling had obtained the Tao, and where his descendants still lived. Recognized by the emperor as the legitimate descendants of Zhang Daoling, these new Celestial Masters established a new patriarchy at their base at Mount Longhu.

=== Revival ===
The importance of the Zhengyi school grew during the Song dynasty, with the Celestial masters frequently receiving imperial appointments. In 1239, the Southern Song dynasty's Emperor Lizong commanded the 35th Celestial Master Zhang Keda to unite the Lingbao School, the Shangqing School and Zhengyi Dao. The new school was to retain the Zhengyi name and remain based at Mount Longhu. Shortly after the schools were united, the Mongols under Kublai Khan conquered the Southern Song dynasty and established the Yuan dynasty in China. He accepted the claim that the Celestial Master of Mount Longhu was descended from Zhang Daoling and granted the school the right to control affairs relating to Taoism in the Jiangnan area. In 1304, as a result of Zhengyi Dao's increased importance under the Mongols, all of the Taoist schools, with the exception of the Quanzhen School, were united under the banner of the Zhengyi School, with the 38th Celestial Master, Zhang Yucai, as spiritual leader.

=== Post-Yuan decline ===
The founding of the Ming dynasty in 1368 marked the beginning of a long decline in the power of Zhengyi Taoism. The first Ming ruler, the Hongwu Emperor (1368–98), suppressed the use of the title of 'Celestial Master' among the Zhengyi School, and the 50th Celestial Master Zhang Guoxiang had his title stripped by the Longqing Emperor (1567–72). By the Daoguang period (1821–50) of the Qing dynasty, relations between the court and the Celestial Masters came to an end. The school's activities became localized to regions in which the school was particularly important. Despite ending association with the court, the Celestial Master himself still retained a great deal of prestige and importance among Taoists throughout China. This prestige, which arose from the belief that he was descended from Zhang Daoling, was evident when the Celestial Master traveled and attracted crowds of people wherever he went.

== Practices ==
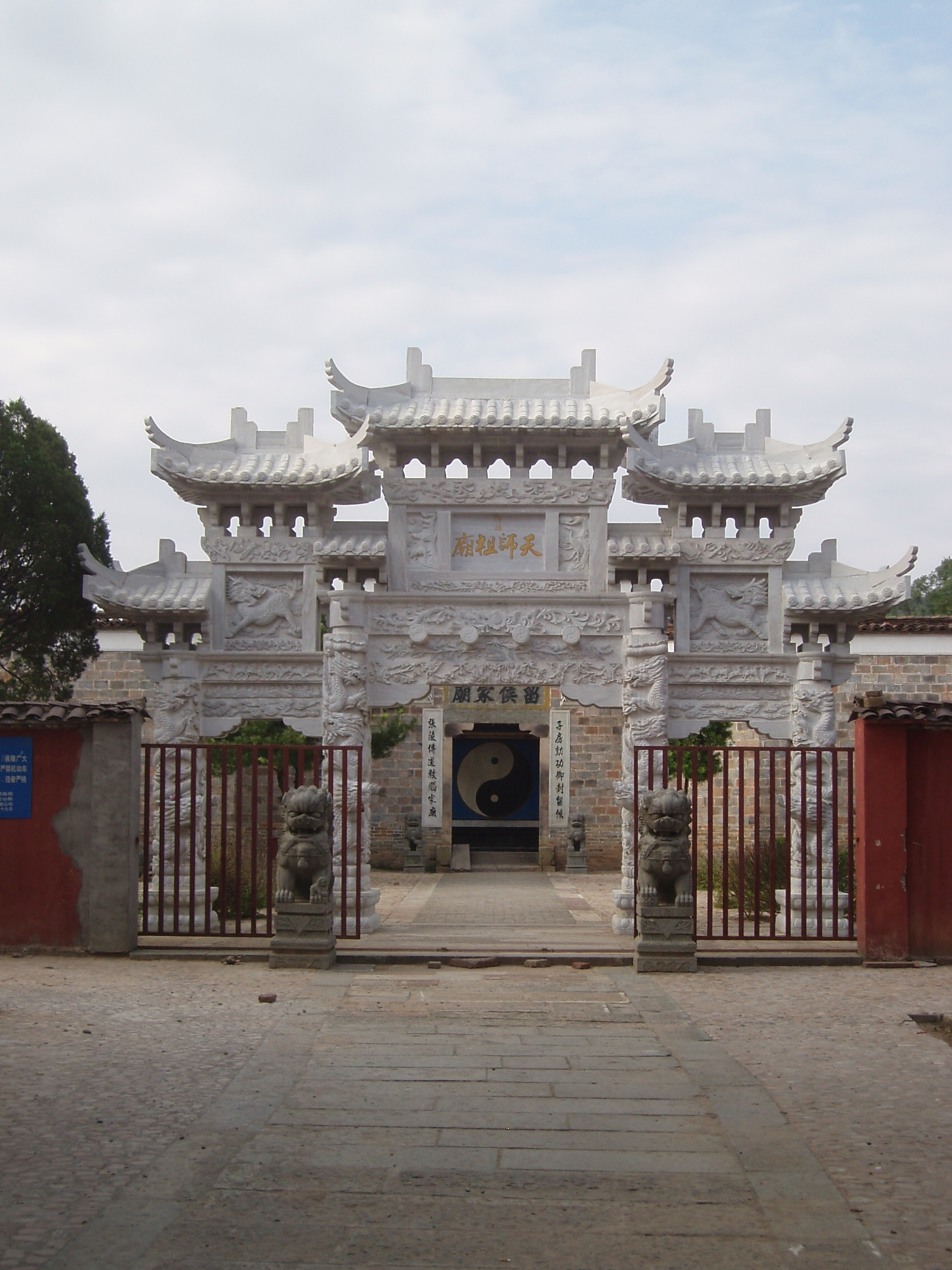
The main gate of the residence of the Celestial Master at Longhu Shan

During the Tang dynasty, the primary activity of Zhengyi Taoists was to sell protective talismans. Local cults developed around the sale of these talismans, and around guilds and associations patronized by members of the church.

One of the fundamental practices of the school was conferring registers (lu) upon people entering Taoism. A register was a way to allow the Taoist tradition to be passed on to future generations by ensuring those who received them had an adequate knowledge of the school's teachings. Registers also had the names of deities written on them who could be called upon by the bearer to assist in times of need. Once one received a register, they were considered to be part of the priesthood. There were different grades of registers for laypeople with differing levels of religious knowledge.

The Celestial Masters adopted the Thunder Rites during the last two decades of the Northern Song dynasty. The Five Thunders variety appeared earlier and was linked with the Celestial Masters.

=== Rituals ===
There are two main types of rituals performed by the Zhengyi Taoists the jiao (Offering) and zhai (Retreat) rituals. The zhai ritual is performed as a way to gain benefits through purification and abstinence, and usually takes place immediately before the jiao ritual. In performing a ritual, an adherent must first recite a litany of repentance, then notify the deities of the merits gained through repentance by submitting a document to heaven. Upon completion of the zhai ritual, the jiao ritual begins in which deities are given offerings and thanked. The jiao ritual is usually performed over a three-day period. Much of the ritual is performed by priests in a temple, but can also involve religious processions through the city, musical performances and a mass offering in front of the temple.

== Texts ==
The Zhengyi Taoists were particularly notable for their work in gathering Taoist texts and assembling them into collections. Zhang Yuchu (1361–1410) received an imperial commission in 1406 to gather texts, in particular those produced during the reign of the Hongwu Emperor (1368–98). With these texts, Zhang compiled a reference work known as the Zhengtong Daozang (Taoist Canon of the Zhengtong Reign), which was an overview of current Taoists texts and practices. Zhang Guoxiang (?-1611), compiled a similar reference work in 1607 known as the Wanli Xu Daozang (Supplementary Taoist Canon of the Wanli Reign Period).

== See also ==
- Zhang Daoling
- Zhang Lu
- Zhang Sicheng
- Zhang Guoxiang
- List of Celestial Masters
- Way of the Celestial Masters
- Mount Longhu
