= List of Celestial Masters =

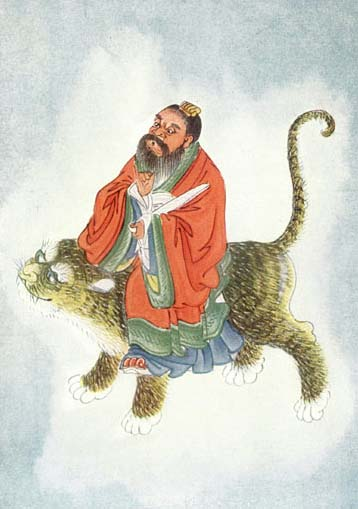
Zhang Daoling, the first Celestial Master.

This is a list of the Celestial Masters, leaders of Zhengyi Dao, continuing Wudoumi Dao (Way of the Five Pecks of Rice). After the death of the 64th Celestial Master Zhang Yuanxian in 2008, controversy arose over the legitimate succession, with different descendants claiming to be the rightful 65th Celestial Master, including Zhang Jintao and three other claimants in mainland China; and Zhang Yijiang and Zhang Meiliang in Taiwan. In English the Celestial Master has sometimes been known as Taoist Pope.

Number	Name	Chinese	Dates
1	Zhang Daoling	张道陵	2nd century CE
2	Zhang Heng	张衡	?-179
3	Zhang Lu	张鲁	?-215
4	Zhang Sheng	张盛
5	Zhang Zhaocheng	张昭成
6	Zhang Jiao	张椒
7	Zhang Hui	张回
8	Zhang Jiong	张迥
9	Zhang Fu	张符
10	Zhang Zixiang	张子祥	ca. 600
11	Zhang Tongxuan	张通玄
12	Zhang Heng	张恒
13	Zhang Guang	张光
14	Zhang Cizheng	张慈正
15	Zhang Gao	张高	ca. 735
16	Zhang Yingshao	张应韶
17	Zhang Yi	张颐
18	Zhang Shiyuan	张士元
19	Zhang Xiu	张修
20	Zhang Chen	张谌
21	Zhang Bingyi	张秉一
22	Zhang Shan	张善
23	Zhang Jiwen	张季文
24	Zhang Zhengsui	张正随	fl. 1015
25	Zhang Qianyao	张干曜
26	Zhang Sizong	张嗣宗
27	Zhang Xiangzhong	张象中
28	Zhang Dunfu	张敦复	fl. 1077
29	Zhang Jingduan	张景瑞	1049?-1100?
30	Zhang Jixian	张继先	1092–1126
31	Zhang Shixiu	张时修
32	Zhang Shouzhen	张守真	?-1176
33	Zhang Jingyuan	张景渊
34	Zhang Qingxian	张庆先
35	Zhang Keda	张可大	1218-63
36	Zhang Zongyan	张宗演	1244-91
37	Zhang Yudi	张与棣	?-1294
38	Zhang Yucai	张与材	?-1316
39	Zhang Sicheng	张嗣成	?-1344?
40	Zhang Side	张嗣德	?-1353
41	Zhang Zhengyan	张正言	?-1359
42	Zhang Zhengchang (Awarded the title of 正一嗣教眞人)	张正常	1335-78
43	Zhang Yuchu	张宇初	1361–1410
44	Zhang Yuqing	张宇清	1364–1427
45	Zhang Maocheng	张懋丞
46	Zhang Yuanji	张元吉
47	Zhang Xuanqing	张原庆
48	Zhang Yanpian	张彦页	1480–1550
49	Zhang Yongxu	张永绪	?-1566
50	Zhang Guoxiang	张国祥	?-1611
51	Zhang Xianyong	张显庸
52	Zhang Yingjing	张应京
53	Zhang Hongren	张洪任
54	Zhang Jizong	张继宗	?-1716
55	Zhang Xilin	张锡麟	?-1727
56	Zhang Yulong	张遇隆	?-1752
57	Zhang Cunyi	张存义	?-1779
58	Zhang Qilong	张起隆	?-1798
59	Zhang Yu	张钰
60	Zhang Peiyuan	张培源	?-1859
61	Zhang Renzheng	张仁政	1841–1903
62	Zhang Yuanxu	张元旭	1862–1924
63	Zhang Enpu	张恩溥	1904–1969
64	Zhang Yuanxian	張源先	1971–2008
