= Northern Celestial Masters =

Taoist movement during Northern and Southern dynasties

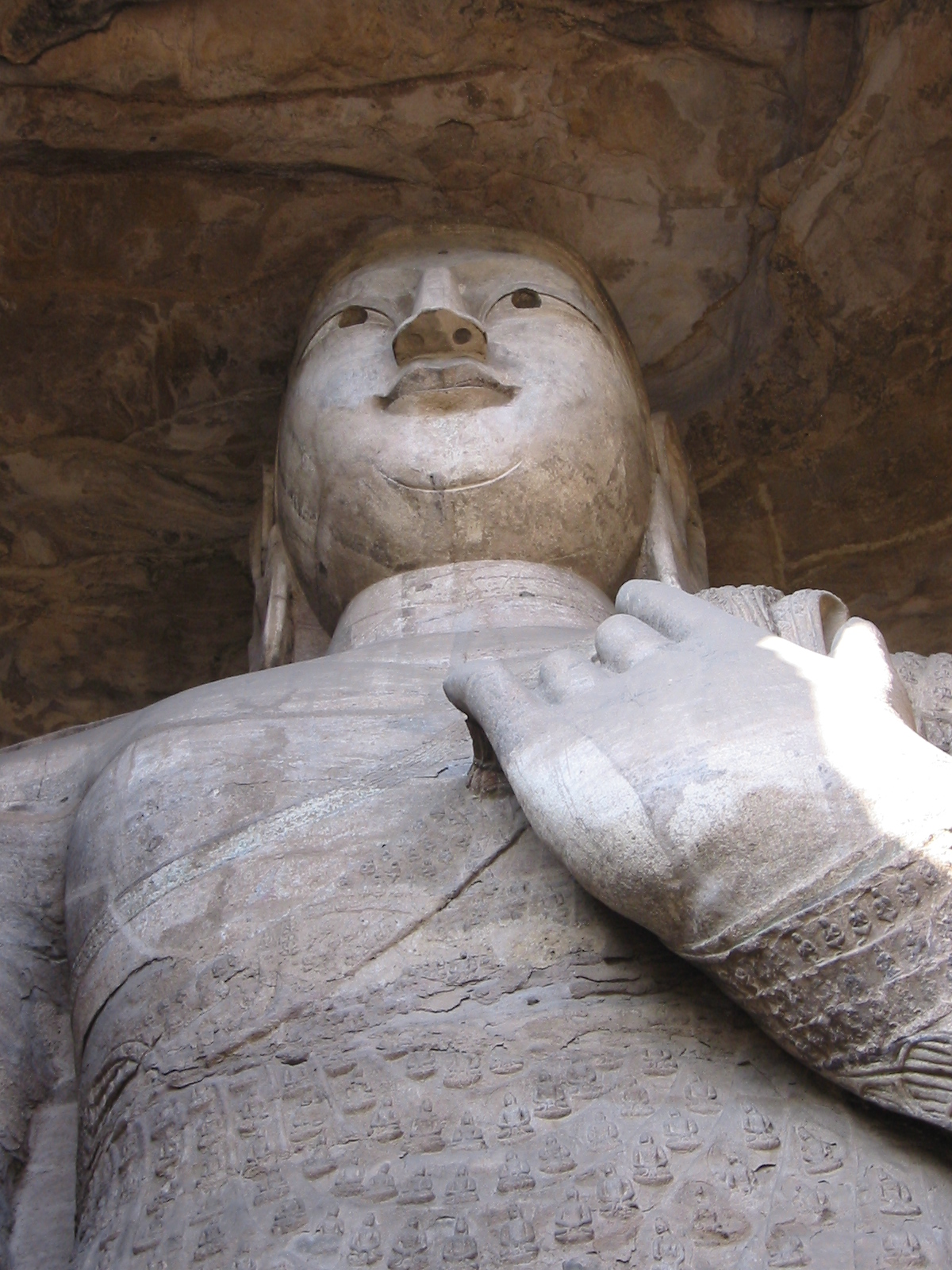
A statue of the Buddha representing Emperor Taiwu.

The Northern Celestial Masters are an evolution of the Daoist Way of the Celestial Master (simplified Chinese: 天师道; traditional Chinese: 天師道; pinyin: Tiān Shī Dào) in the north of China during the Southern and Northern Dynasties. The Northern Celestial Masters were a continuation of the Way as it had been practiced in Sichuan province by Zhang Lu and his followers. After the community was forced to relocate in 215 CE, a group of Celestial Masters established themselves in Northern China. Kou Qianzhi, from a family who followed the Celestial Master, brought a new version of Celestial Master Daoism to the Northern Wei. The Northern Wei government embraced his form of Daoism and established it as the state religion, thereby creating a new Daoist theocracy that lasted until 450 CE. The arrival of Buddhism had great influence on the Northern Celestial Masters, bringing monasticism and influencing the diet of practitioners. Art produced in areas dominated by the Northern Celestial Masters also began to show Buddhist influence. When the theocracy collapsed, many Daoists fled to Louguan, which quickly became an important religious center. The Northern Celestial Masters survived as a distinct school at Louguan until the late 7th century CE, when they became integrated into the wider Daoist movement.

== History ==
=== Northern Wei (424-450) ===
Kou Qianzhi was a member of Celestial Master family that came from an area near Chang'an. Inspired by the burgeoning Taoist movement in Southern China, Kou retreated to Mount Song in Henan to receive inspiration. On the mountain, as described by the text The History of the Wei Dynasty, he was visited twice by Laozi. In his first visit in 415, Laozi revealed to Kou a text known as the Laojun Yinsong Jiejing (New Code). This text contained precepts designed for a new religious community. In 423, a messenger of Laozi came and offered Kou a new text called the Lutu Zhenjing (Perfect Scripture of Registers and Charts), which is now lost, and appointed him as the new Celestial Master.

In 424, Kou took these texts with him to the Wei court. There, he was welcomed by Emperor Taiwu and garnered the support of Cui Hao, the prime minister. Even though Cui Hao was a Confucianist, he greatly admired Kou and was immediately drawn to him. Cui also appreciated Kou's mathematical skills and hoped that he might help him improve his own longevity techniques. They also shared a dream of a 'purified society,' a land where peace and justice prevailed. Kou's 'New Code' was promulgated throughout the realm, and a large altar was built near the capital where 120 Taoist practitioners performed rites and prayers daily. Cui gained a great deal of power in the court, and in 444 began to purge the Buddhist clergy. This led to a major persecution against Buddhists in 446. In 448, Kou Qianzhi was 'released' from his body, and Cui lost his greatest supporter at the court. Shortly after Kou's death, Cui had a national history of Wei dynasty containing unflattering portraits of its rulers carved in stone. This so enraged the emperor, that he had Cui executed in 450. After Cui's execution, the Taoist community was forced to flee, with many of them settling at the Taoist center of Louguan southwest of Chang'an.

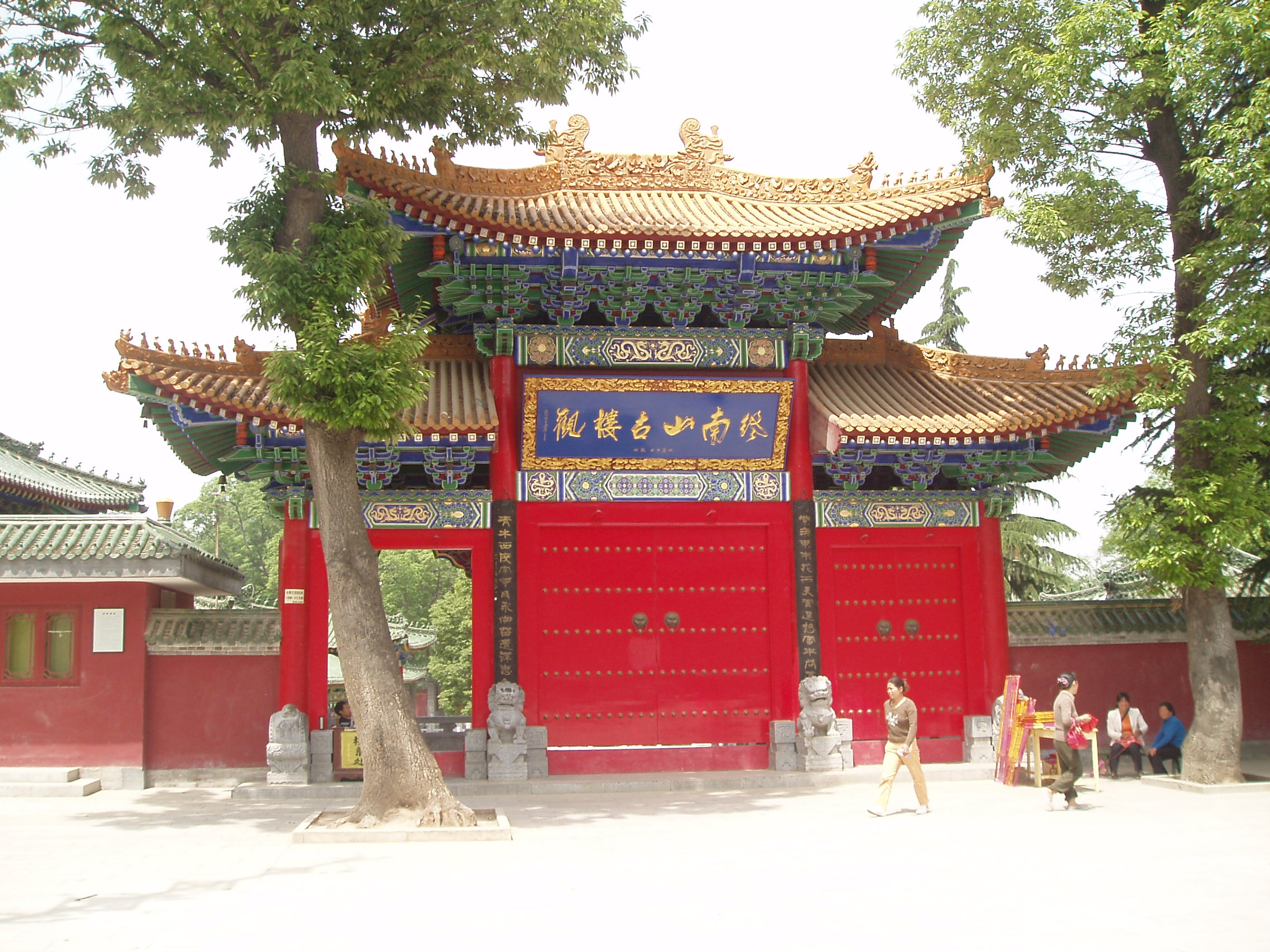
The entrance to the Louguan temple.

=== Louguan (450-688) ===
By the late 470s, Taoists fleeing from the Northern Wei court had transformed Louguan into an important religious center. According to legend, Louguan used to be the home of Yin Xi, the first recipient of the Dao de jing. At this time, the center's buildings were greatly expanded, and many Taoist scriptures were collected, including materials from the Lingbao and Shangqing schools. During the 7th century, the school had a prominent role in a series of debates that examined whether Buddhism or Taoism would be better suited to bring stability to the realm. The first debate surrounded Fu Yi, a scholar and Taoist who proposed that Buddhism be abolished in China. Naturally, the Buddhists were not happy with his suggestions and countered his arguments in several treatises. The second debate concerned Lu Zhongqing, a friend of Fu Yi, who wrote about Buddhism's inferiority to Taoism. The Tang emperors were in support of the Taoists, and in 637 issued an edict that secured the precedence of Taoism over Buddhism. This edict remained in place until 674, when Empress Wu Zetian came to power. At the same time, Louguan also served as a refuge for Taoists fleeing the persecution of Emperor Wu of the Liang dynasty to the south. The final Northern Celestial Master, Yin Wencao arrived at Louguan in 636 and later achieved the favor of the Gaozong Emperor. After Yin's death in 688, Louguan remained an important place of Taoist learning, but ceased to be considered part of a distinct school.

== Texts ==
The most important text from the Northern Wei period of the Northern Celestial Masters is the Laojun Yinsong Jiejing (New Code). This text was revealed to Kou Qianzhi in 415, and is now mostly lost apart from a few fragments. The surviving text contains thirty-six precepts that outline rules which a Daoist had to abide by. The behavioral rules outlined proper public conduct and what to do in case of sickness. There were also guidelines describing how banquets were to be set up, as well ritual instructions concerning funeral rites, immortality practice and petitions.

One of the most important text's from the school's Louguan period is called the Xishengjing (The Scripture of Western Ascension). This text describes Laozi's emigration to India and the transmission of the Daode Jing to Yin Xi. However, the text is not really a narrative, but uses the stories as a framework to describe how an adept should live his life. The text describes how an adept can make use of the Dao that is inherent in the world, outlines meditation techniques, and discusses the results of living a sagely life and what happens after death.

== Beliefs ==
The Northern Celestial Master variety of Daoism was both similar and different from Zhang Lu's earlier form. Unlike prior incarnations of the Celestial Masters, which supported sexual practices as a means of achieving immortality, Kou's text urged that the sexual arts be purged from the religion. In addition, he also states that religion must be purged of the imposition of religious taxes on the faithful and the inheritance of religious titles. In the Northern Celestial Masters, Laozi became closely linked with the Buddha, who was claimed to be a student of Laozi. There were also very specific dietary requirements that had to be followed, as well as other rules, many of which were influenced by Buddhism. The Northern Celestial Masters were also the first Daoists to practice a form of monasticism, another idea that came from Buddhism. Kou also condemned messianic movements and called for texts such as the Daodejing to be copied and recited. Those people who were good in life would gain immortality in a new age, whereas those who were bad would be reborn as insects or animals.

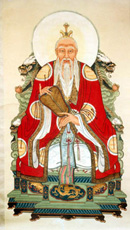
Laozi, depicted as the Taoist god.

Some similarities between earlier Celestial Master Daoism include the role of Laozi. Laozi was viewed as the personification of the Dao, who existed for eternity and created the world. He was believed to be the creator of the universe and came to earth intermittently to bring forth sacred scriptures, including the Daode Jing and Xisheng Jing. Moreover, Laozi continued to appear periodically and bring forth new scriptures to both Kou Qianzhi and adherents at Louguan, surrounded by a celestial entourage and announced by a celestial envoy. Laozi was also extremely closely linked with the Buddha, and in certain sources, even became the Buddha or announced Yinxi as the Buddha.

== Practices ==
The Northern Celestial Masters followed certain regular, communal rites. One of these communal rites involved formal banquets. These feasts could last as long as seven days. In order to purify themselves for feasts, members had to abstain from eating meat, garlic, green onions, ginger, leeks and onions. A banquet consisted of three courses – wine, rice and a vegetarian meal. Ritual activity during feasts and other activities usually involved a series of bows and prostrations as well as the burning of incense. Banquets were also held when someone died. During these banquets, attendees would perform rituals aimed at remitting the sins of the deceased.

While monasticism had existed in Chinese Buddhism, the Northern Celestial Masters were one of the first Daoist groups to practice it. Kou lived a monastic lifestyle on Songshan, known today for being the location of the Shaolin Monastery. Monasticism developed further during the Louguan phase of the Northern Celestial Masters due to this influence of Buddhism. During this period, a clear distinction developed between lay and monastic followers in Daoism. The ordination, precepts and way in which monks sought salvation were all influenced by Buddhism.

== Art ==
Many art objects were produced in Northern China during the time of the Northern Celestial Masters. These objects were closely modeled on Buddhist designs. The image of the god (usually Laozi), would be carved on the front side of a stone stele, with inscriptions on the back or side of the carving. The inscriptions were usually prayers to the dead, a wish for the happiness of family members or wishes for political peace. The iconography and contents of the inscriptions show that a close relationship between Daoism and Buddhism existed in the Northern Wei state. This relationship is especially evident in some four-sided stelae that had carvings of both Laozi on two sides and the Buddha on the other two.
