= Mount Longhu =

Taoist mountain in Jiangxi, China

Longhu Shan
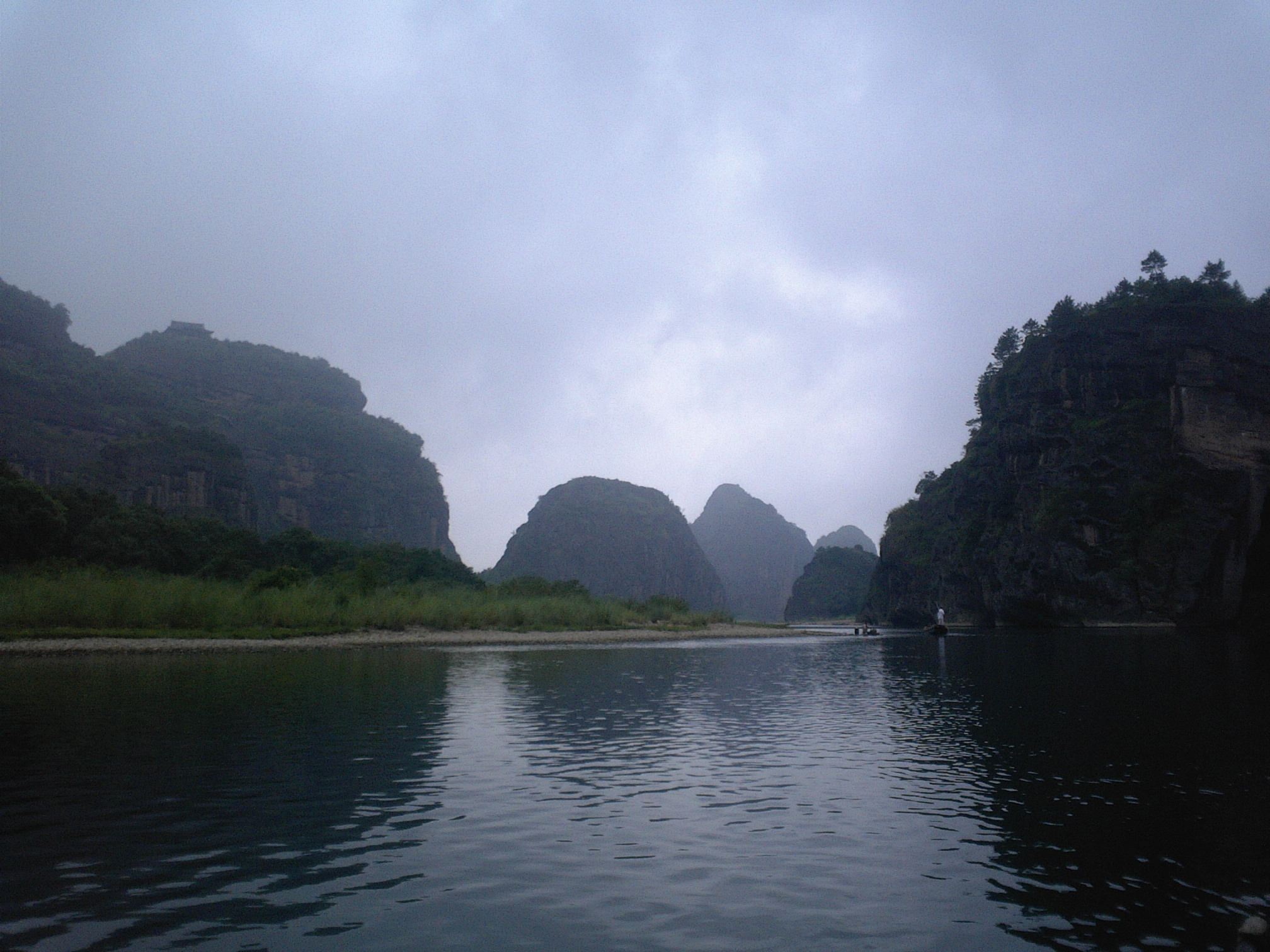
- Mount Longhu

Highest point
- Elevation: 150 m (490 ft)
- Coordinates: 28°6′49″N 116°57′30″E

Geography
- Location: Jiangxi, China

Mount Longhu (Chinese: 龙虎山; pinyin: Lónghǔ Shān; lit. 'Dragon Tiger Mountain', Gan: Lung-fu San) is located in Yingtan, Jiangxi, China. It is famous for being one of the birthplaces of Taoism, with many Taoist temples built upon the mountainside. It is particularly important to the Zhengyi Dao as the Shangqing Temple and the Mansion of the Taoist Master (天师府) are located here. It is also known as one of the Four Sacred Mountains of Taoism.

Two notable Taoist temples on Mount Longhu are the temples of Immortal City (仙岩) and Zhengyi (正一), both founded by Zhang Daoling (张道陵), the Han dynasty founder of the religion. There are more Taoist temples in nearby Shangqing (上清), one of which is mentioned at the beginning of the famous Chinese traditional novel, Outlaws of the Marsh (水滸傳).

Mount Longhu also has cultural significance as a historical burial site of the Guyue people, who placed the deceased in hanging coffins on the mountain's cliff faces.

In August 2010 UNESCO inscribed Mount Longhu on the World Heritage List as part of the complex of six sites that make up the China Danxia.

Mount Longhu can be reached from the nearby city of Yingtan.

== Gallery ==
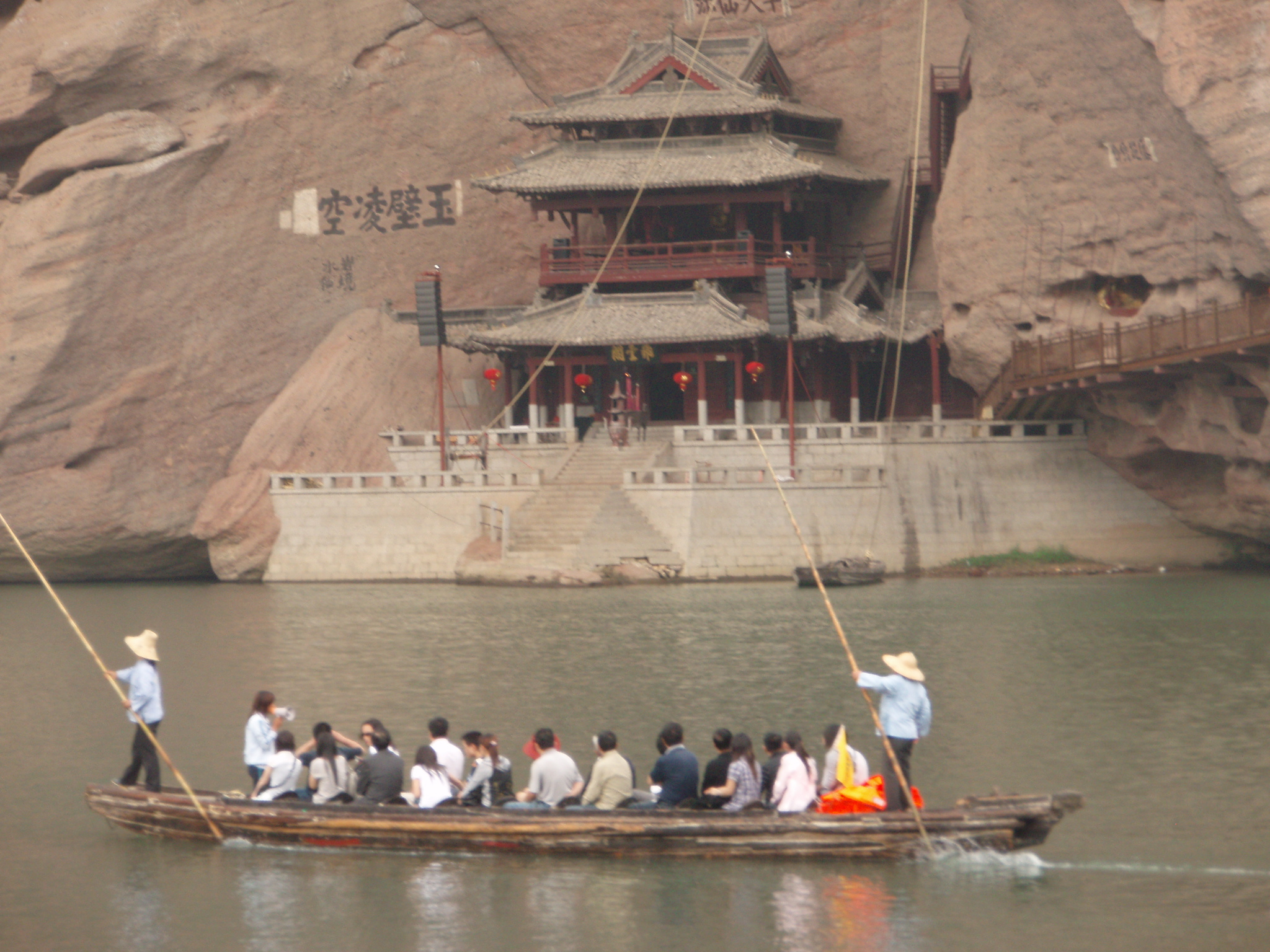
A cliff-side Taoist temple

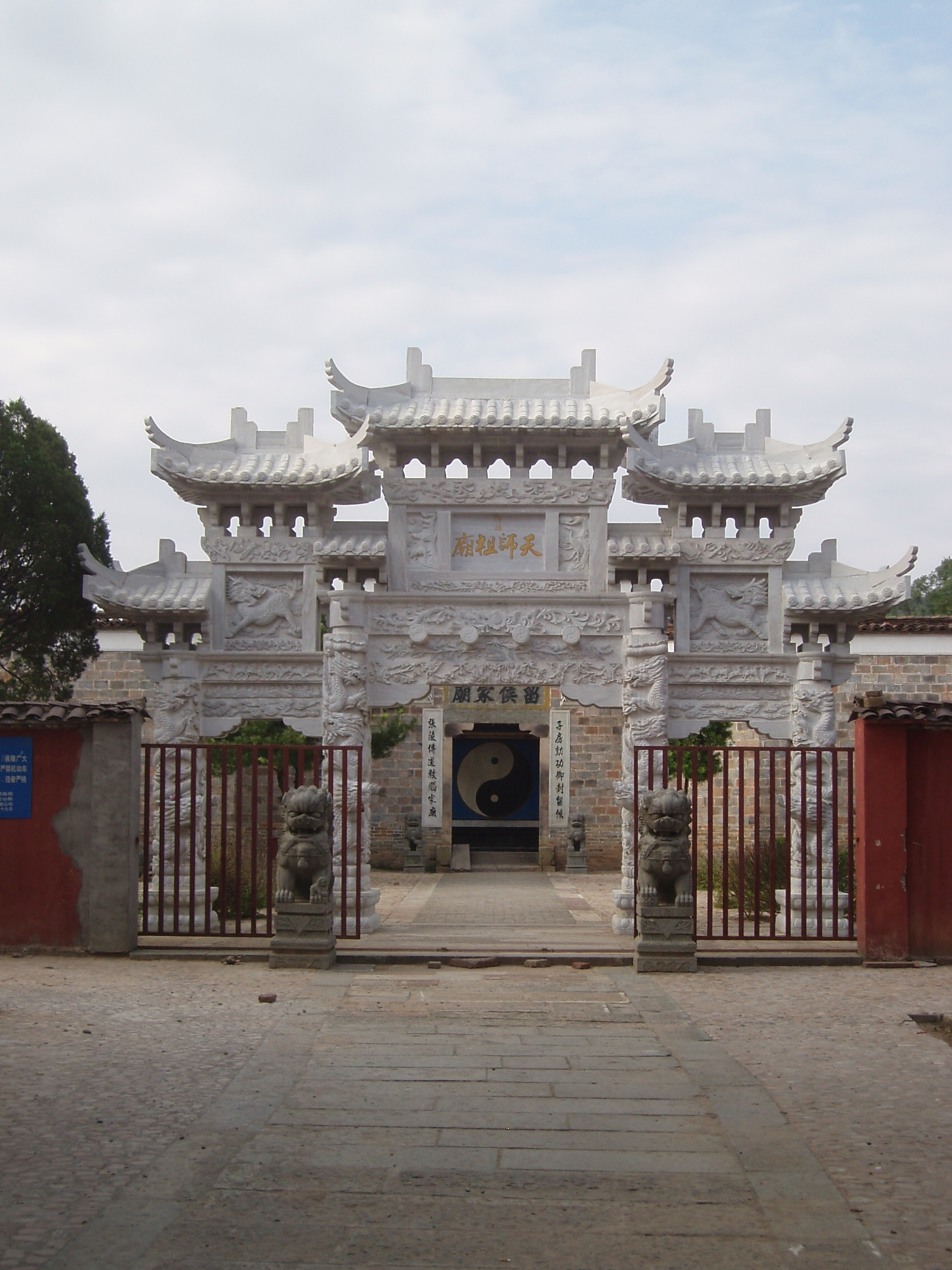
The Tianshifu Gate of the Celestial Master Temple at Mount Longhu

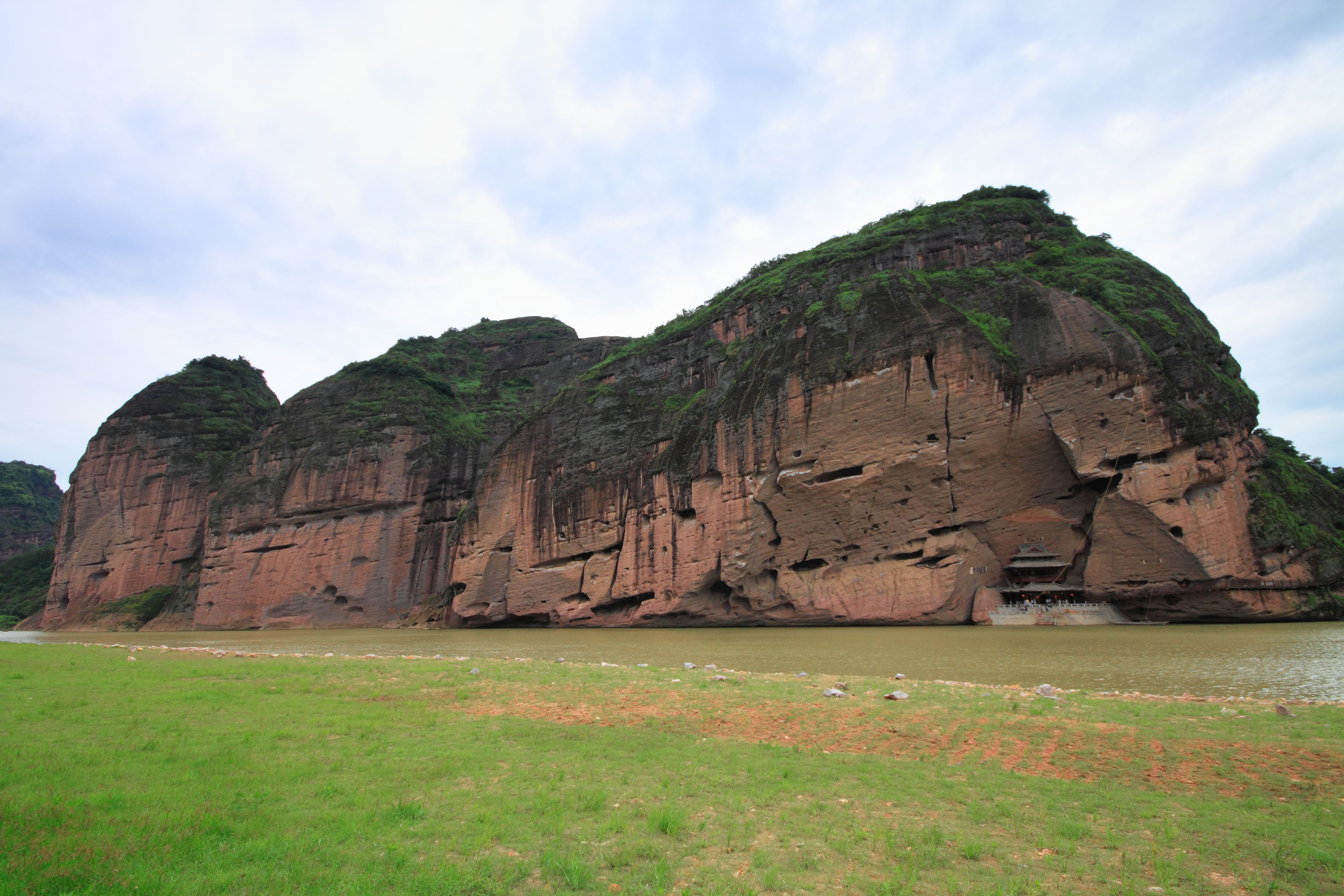
View of the mountain's cliff

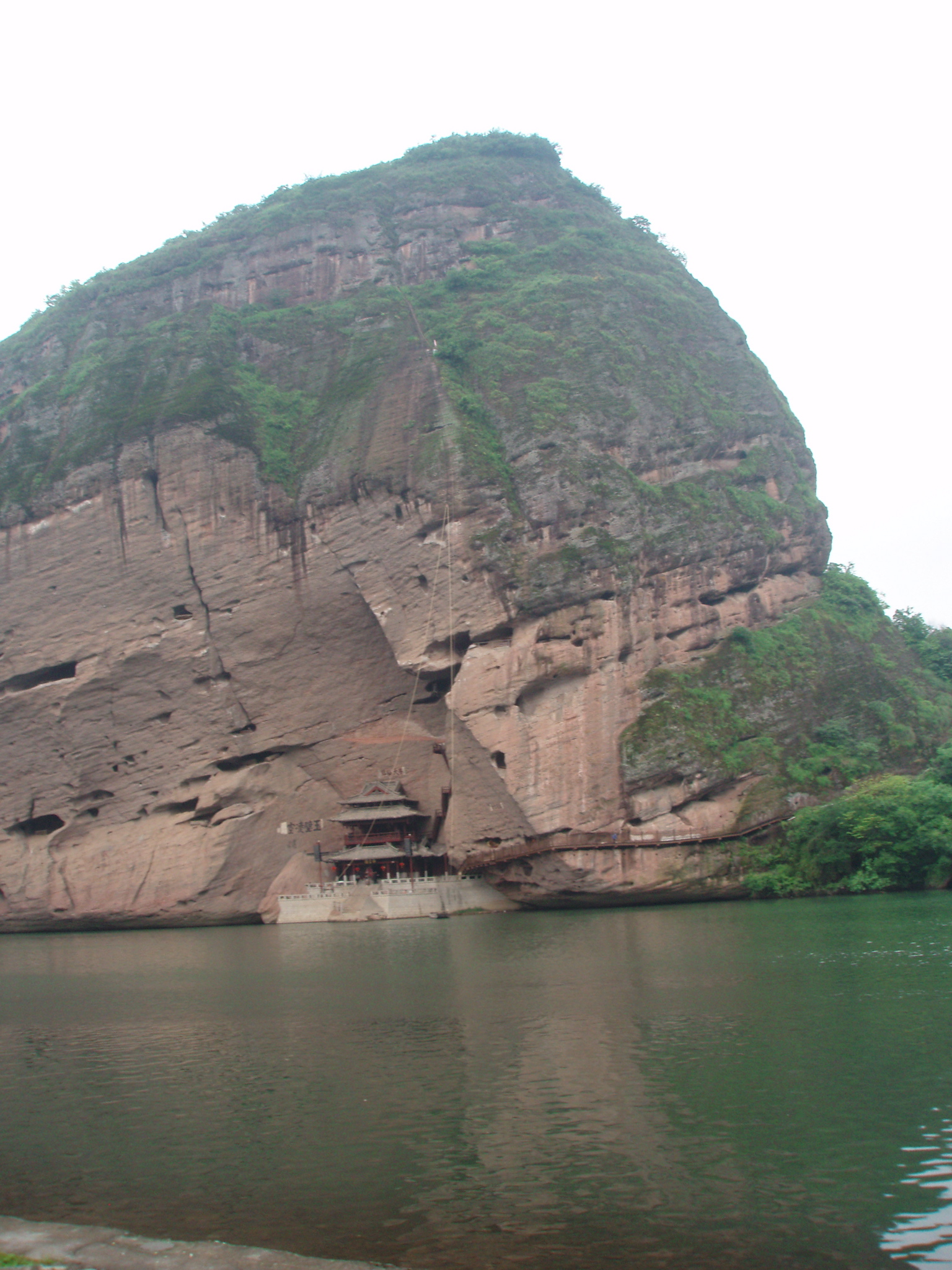
Close-up of the cliff

== See also ==
- Mount Lu
- Jinggang Mountains
