= Way of the Celestial Masters =

Religious school of Taoism

- Traditional Chinese: 天師道
- Simplified Chinese: 天师道
Transcriptions
Standard Mandarin
- Hanyu Pinyin: Tiān Shī Dào

The Way of the Celestial Masters or the Heavenly Masters Sect is a Chinese Taoist movement that was founded by Zhang Daoling in 142 AD. Its followers rebelled against the Han dynasty, and won their independence in 194. At its height, the movement controlled a theocratic state in what is now Sichuan.

== History ==
=== Way of the Five Pecks of Rice ===
In 142 CE, Zhang Daoling announced that Laozi had appeared to him, and commanded him to rid the world of decadence and establish a new state consisting only of the "chosen people". Zhang became the first Celestial Master, and began to spread his newly founded movement throughout the province of Sichuan. The movement was initially called the "Way of the Five Pecks of Rice", because each person wishing to join was required to donate five pecks of rice. The movement spread rapidly, particularly under his son Zhang Heng and grandson Zhang Lu. Their rebellion against the Han dynasty is known as the Five Pecks of Rice Rebellion. After the success of the rebellion in 194, they founded the theocratic state of Zhang Han in the Hanzhong Valley of Sichuan, enjoying full independence.

正一 Zhengyi included in their religious liturgy, the Daoist writings of the Han, Laozi, the 3 caves and 7 parts. 方士 Fangshi originated in southern China. Sin was punished by ailments in the view of the Heavenly Masters. The Shangqing syncretized the Heavenly Masters with fangshi. Buddhism, Fangshi, and Heavenly Masters were synchronized in Lingbao.

The 180 precepts of the Celestial Masters were rules on morality. Stocking up riches was banned by Daoism.

A 173 AD Sichuan stele provides physical proof for the Celestial Masters existence at its oldest. China's southeastern area may have seen the spread of Celestial Masters in the Six Dynasties. At the start of their existence a large amount of religious text canon was already written by the Celestial Masters. Celestial Masters used an 精室 "essential chamber" for ceremonies. Specific attire was worn by Daoists. Celestial Master collectives had secretaries assigned to them on the basis of their population. Clerics of the Celestial Masters were referred to as 黃赤祭酒 "libationers of the yellow and red" in the era of the Six dynasties. There were stationery clerics and roving clerics. Distinctions between different social groups in civilization were recognized and utilized accordingly by the Celestial Masters. The Celestial Masters did not find monastic lifestyle attractive and rather passed down their teachings to their biological heirs. Children and widows were part of the Celestial Master groups. Tablets were clutched and prostrations were conducted by clerics. The Dadaojia Lingjie denounced the Yellow Turbans who were enemies of the Celestial Masters. A ritual master of the Celestial Masters may have been a 齋官 fast officer. Daoist Lingbao and Celestial Masters may have overlapped in customs with the Daoist Louguan ceremonies.

Building temples, effigies and fasting was practiced by Daoists to gain blessings.

寇謙之 Kou Qianzhi was the leader of the Celestial Masters north branch.

Celestial Masters north branch under Kou Qianzhi worshipped divinities described in the 魏書 Book of Wei. Yin Xi and the Elder Lord are absent from the Celestial Masters of Kou Qianzhi.

Shandong, Hebei, Henan, Shaanxi, and Shanxi were where the Celestial Masters northern branch operated, while Louguan and Guanzhong Daoism developed around Henan, Shanxi and Shaanxi. Celestial Masters are not believed to be connected with stele founded in Shaanxi.

An anti-Buddhist plan was concocted by the Celestial Masters under Kou Qianzhi along with Cui Hao under the Taiwu Emperor. The Celestial Masters of the north urged the persecution of Buddhists under the Taiwu Emperor in the Northern Wei, attacking Buddhism and the Buddha as wicked, and as anti-stability and anti-family. Anti-Buddhism was the position of Kou Qianzhi. There was no ban on the Celestial Masters despite the non-fulfillment of Cui Hao and Kou Qianzhi's agenda in their anti-Buddhist campaign.

太上老君 Taishang Laojun was the Celestial Masters' main deity.

In the Southern dynasties 正一經 Zhengyi Jing was part of the religious canon of the Celestial Masters. In the Tang and Sui Daoists reconciled the Zhengyi jing with the religious texts of the Lingbao.

Celestial Masters and the nobility of northern China subdued the nobility of southern China during the Eastern Jin and Western Jin in Jiangnan in particular.

The Celestial Master canon was not found among the religious texts in the Lingbao caves.

The ceremonies of the Celestial Masters, Sanhuang, Lingbao, and Shangqing were categorized and grouped by Lu Xiujing.

In the Eastern Han the Celestial Masters spread to the northwest. Celestial Masters believed in communication with spirits.

Religious canon was divided into 七部 7 sections during the Southern dynasties by the Celestial Masters. Non specific designations were used for the divinities of the most sublime station by the Celestial Masters. 道門定制 Daomen dingzhi was a religious texts composed in the Song dynasty. Buddhism, Celestial Masters and fangshi all contributed to the religious canon of Lingbao. Celestial Master petitions to divinities were copied by the canon of the Lingbao and fangshi rites were also copied by them. Sichuan was the origin of the Celestial Masters. Different beliefs were held by the different groups of Daoists. 天師治儀 Tianshi zhiyi.

In 215, Zhang Lu submitted to Cao Cao, the ruler of the Wei Kingdom, surrendering his state in exchange for gaining state religion status for Tianshi Daoism. Zhang was given a title and land, as were several other family members and generals. His daughter was married to Cao Cao's son, Cao Yu. His followers were forced to resettle in other parts of China, with one group being sent to the Chang'an area, and another being sent to Luoyang. Zhang relocated to the Han court until the Han dynasty changed to the Wei. He then used his own popularity as a religious leader to lend legitimacy to the Wei, proclaiming that the Wei court had inherited divine authority from the Tao church, as well as from Confucian laws.

The collapse of the Wei Kingdom in 260 CE, along with the fall of Northern China to the Huns in 317, further scattered adherents to the Celestial Masterhood. The Celestial Masters later reemerged in the 4th and 5th centuries as two distinct offshoots, the Northern and Southern Celestial Masters.

Celestial Masters had prophecy rituals banned since what happens in the future it was supposed to be just known already by the member without rituals.

For the water, earth, and heaven officials, Celestial Masters wrote the 三官手書 sanguan shoushu.

=== The Southern Celestial Masters ===
After the fall of Luoyang to non-Chinese invaders in 311, the remnants of the court fled to Jiankang (modern-day Nanjing) and established a new state known as the Eastern Jin dynasty. Among the court members who fled were members of the Celestial Masters. There is also evidence that after Zhang Lu's submission to Cao Cao, numerous adherents fled south from Sichuan. These various followers of The Way of the Celestial Master coalesced to form a distinct form of Celestial Master Daoism known as the Southern Celestial Masters. The Southern Celestial Masters lasted as a distinct movement into the fifth century.

=== The Northern Celestial Masters ===
Kou Qianzhi, who was raised in a Celestial Master family, received two visions of Laozi in 415 and in 423. In 424, he brought the work that resulted from these visions to the court of the Northern Wei dynasty. The rulers put his works into practice, and Kou became the Celestial Master of the Daoist theocracy of the Northern Wei. After Kou died in 448, the prime minister, Cui Hao, became power hungry and began to insult the Wei rulers. Unhappy with his insubordination, the rulers had Cui executed in 450, and ended the Daoist theocracy.

=== The Celestial Masters today ===
During the Yuan dynasty, the Zhengyi Dao School of Daoism claimed lineage to the Celestial Masters. They became one of the two leading schools of Daoism in China, along with Quanzhen Dao. Zhengyi Daoists became common in the Jiangxi, Jiangsu, and Fujian provinces of China, as well as in Taiwan.

Zhang Yucai, the Celestial Master (38th) drew a handscroll of a dragon. Zhang Sicheng was the 39th and succeeded him.

Celestial Master teachings and Daoxue were mixed together by Yu Ji, whose teacher was 吳澄 Wu Cheng.

Daoism's biggest known conceptions are folk religion, the Celestial Masters, and Quanzhen Daoism in the modern era since Wang Changyue launched a renaissance of the Quanzhen.

The Celestial Masters have survived into the 20th century. In 1949, after the communists dominated mainland China, the 63rd Celestial Master, Zhang Enpu (張恩溥), migrated to Taiwan with the Kuomintang government. After his death, a succession dispute arose between different branches of the family in Taiwan and mainland China.

The Celestial Masters Order in mainland China suffered badly during the Cultural Revolution but managed to survive. They were finally allowed to ordain priests into Zhengyi Order at the Celestial Master's Mansion in 1982.

== Beliefs and practices ==
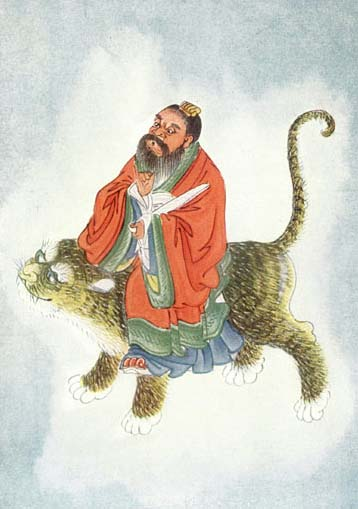
Zhang Daoling, the first Celestial Master

Each of the three different eras of the Celestial Masters had distinct beliefs. However, because the Southern and Northern Celestial Masters both descended directly from the initial movement founded by Zhang Daoling, there are many beliefs that are shared. A number of texts exist that give insight into early Celestial Master practice, in particular the Taiping Jing and the Xiang'er commentary to the Laozi.

The foundation of Daoist belief is that there is an energy source known as qi that pervades all things. The human body also contains qi, but it only has a limited amount of qi. Qi could be lost from the body through things such as sweating and ejaculation. The Celestial Masters shared these foundational Daoist beliefs, but modified them slightly.

One such change was that illness was caused by sin. This was because sin caused qi to leave the body. In order to cure any illness, repentance was a crucial factor in ensuring that the loss of qi could be staunched. Repentance could be accomplished by spending time in a 'Chamber of Silence,' and reflecting on one's sins, or by beating one's breasts and kowtowing to heaven. Illness could also be cured in other ways as well, among them using medicinal herbs and by listening to ritual music. Eating very little was also of extreme importance, and an ideal diet would consist of no food at all, but only noncorporeal things such as air, which the person could absorb through meditation.

Sexual practices (known as heqi, or 'The Union of the Breaths') were not part of Celestial Master Daoism. While the School of the Naturalists (and offshoot schools) advocated Huanjing bunao ("returning the semen/essence to replenish the brain"), which the Celestial Masters frowned upon, and simply advocated celibacy as a way to avoid losing qi. In addition, the Celestial Masters thought that the macrobiotic method of stealing a woman's qi to replenish the man's own qi was completely wrong, and should not be practiced.

== Significance ==
The Celestial Masters were the first group of organized Daoists. Before their foundation, Daoism did not exist as an organized religion. Being the first organized religious Daoists, the Celestial Masters are the ancestors of subsequent Daoist movements such as the Shangqing and Lingbao movements.

== See also ==
- Zhang Daoling
- Zhang Lu
- List of Celestial Masters
- Zhengyi Dao
- Xiang'er
- Mount Longhu
