= Zhang Lu (Han dynasty) =

Chinese official, warlord and religious leader (died 216)

- 張魯

General Who Guards the South (鎮南將軍)
- In office 215 – 216
- Monarch: Emperor Xian of Han
- Chancellor: Cao Cao

Administrator of Hanning (漢寧太守)
- In office ? – 215
- Monarch: Emperor Xian of Han

Personal details
- Born: Unknown Feng County, Jiangsu
- Died: 216
- Resting place: Handan, Hebei
- Children: Zhang Fu; Zhang Guang; Zhang Yong; Zhang Sheng; Zhang Yi; Zhang Ju; Zhang Mengde; Zhang Qiying; Cao Yu's wife; at least three other sons and eight other daughters
- Parents: Zhang Heng (father); Lady Lu (mother)
- Relatives: Zhang Wei (brother); Zhang Kui (brother); Zhang Zheng (brother); Zhang Yulan (sister)
- Occupation: Politician, religious leader, warlord
- Courtesy name: Gongqi (公祺 or 公旗)
- Posthumous name: Marquis Yuan (原侯)
- Peerage: Marquis of Langzhong (閬中侯)

Zhang Lu (died 216), courtesy name Gongqi, posthumously known as Marquis Yuan of Langzhong (閬中原侯), was a Chinese politician, religious leader, and warlord who lived during the late Eastern Han dynasty. He was the third generation Celestial Master, a Taoist religious order. He controlled a state in the Hanzhong region, which he had named Hanning (漢寧) until 215, when he surrendered to Cao Cao, whom he would serve until his death one year later.

== Warlord of Hanzhong ==
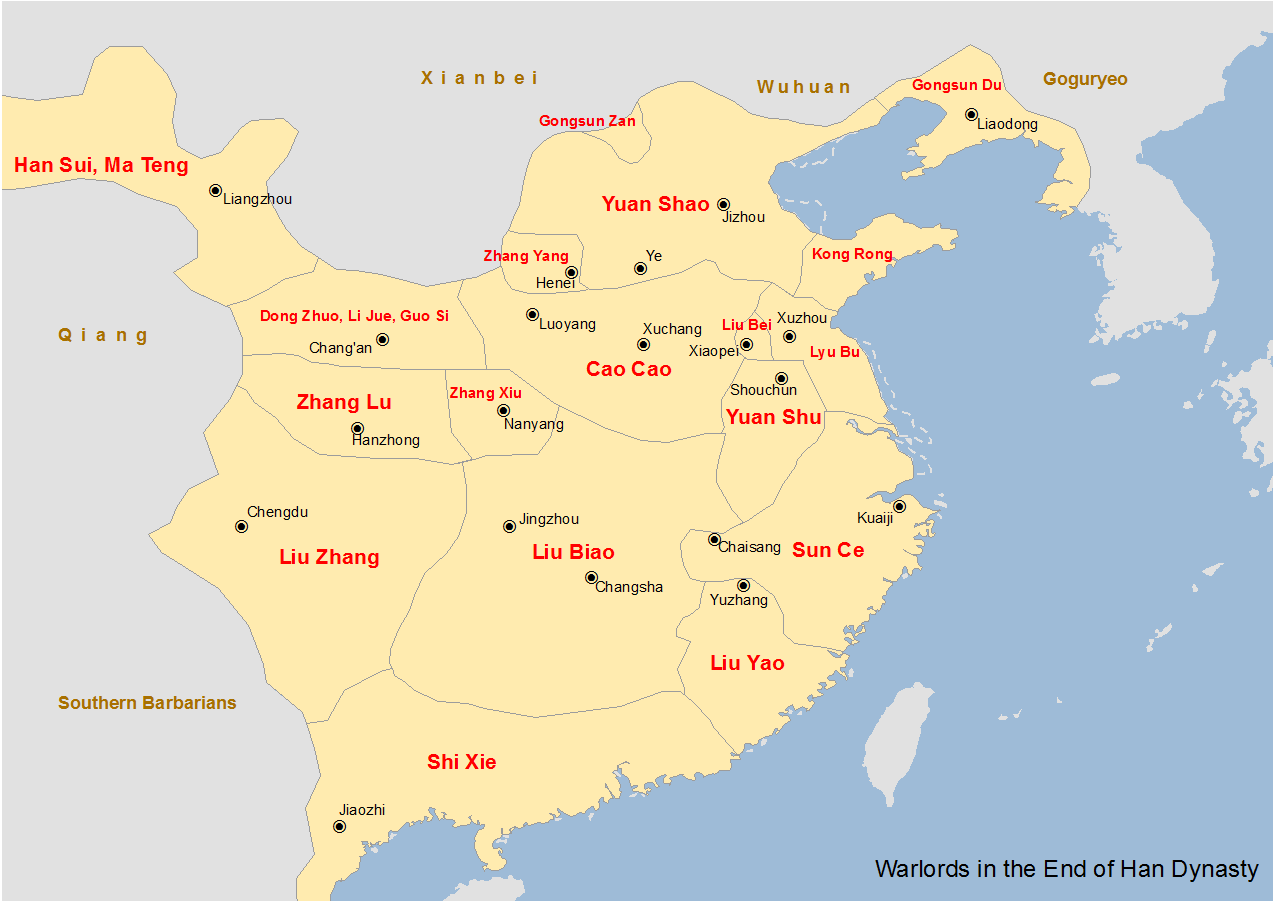
Map showing the major warlords of the Han dynasty in the 190s, including Zhang Lu

Upon the death of his father, Zhang Heng (张衡), Zhang Lu inherited control of the Celestial Masters religious group, and therefore became its third leader (the first was Zhang Lu's grandfather Zhang Daoling). The religion enjoyed its greatest popularity in Yi Province (covering present-day Sichuan and Chongqing), but when Zhang Lu took control of the group, it was being challenged in the area by a shamanistic religion led by Zhang Xiu (張脩, no family relation to Zhang Lu).

Against this background, both Zhang Lu and Zhang Xiu were abruptly ordered by Liu Yan to go together to attack Su Gu (蘇固), the Han-appointed administrator of Hanzhong Commandery, and take over his territory. However, having his own designs, Zhang Lu killed Zhang Xiu and took command of his troops and religious followers before he went off for the campaign against Hanzhong. He successfully managed to defeat Su Gu, and upon taking control of Hanzhong, renamed the region Hanning (漢寧), ruling it by the principles of his religion. Although he nominally followed the orders of Liu Yan, when Liu Zhang succeeded him many years later, Zhang Lu refused to follow Liu Zhang's orders. As a result, Liu Zhang ordered the execution of Zhang Lu's mother, younger brothers and many other family members.

It is said that Zhang Lu's rule over his territory was for its time very humane and civilised. Roads were built throughout the territory with rest stops and foods provided free of charge. The taxes and donations taken from the people were not to be used for amusement, but instead for the support of the common people. In addition, under his leadership was a powerful army and strong defences such that neither Cao Cao nor Li Jue could easily defeat him. The Han central government recognised Zhang Lu's authority over Hanzhong Commandery and appointed him as General of the Household Who Guards Civilians (鎮民中郎將) and the Administrator of Hanning (漢寧太守). According to the Records of the Three Kingdoms, Zhang Lu received a jeweled seal from the common people of his realm, which was a sign from Heaven that he was to become a king. Many of his subordinates urged him to declare himself king, but his adviser Yan Pu (閻圃) warned that to do so would bring disaster. Zhang Lu heeded Yan Pu's advice.

== Surrender to Cao Cao ==
In 211, Zhong Yao suggested to the warlord Cao Cao, who was the de facto head of the Han central government, to launch an invasion of Hanzhong Commandery. Cao Cao heeded his advice and mobilised his forces. However, the warlords Ma Chao and Han Sui, who were based in the Guanzhong region in between Cao Cao's territories and Hanzhong Commandery, thought that Cao Cao wanted to attack them so they started a revolt against the Han central government, leading to the Battle of Tong Pass and subsequent battles. Although Cao Cao's forces emerged victorious against the Guanzhong warlords, they were in no condition to continue attacking Hanzhong Commandery so they retreated. Ma Chao escaped to Hanzhong Commandery after his defeat and pledged allegiance to Zhang Lu, who considered marrying his daughter to him. However, a subordinate of Zhang Lu's, Yang Bo (楊柏), said, "A man like that, who has no love for even his parents (referring to the execution of Ma Teng caused by Ma Chao's rebellion), cannot love another" and the marriage proposal was scrapped. Ma Chao then borrowed soldiers from Zhang Lu and attempted to regain some of his lost territory from Cao Cao, but was ultimately unsuccessful. His failures caused the relationship between the two to sour. When Liu Bei's forces had surrounded Liu Zhang, Ma Chao chose this time to leave Hanzhong Commandery with his own followers and join Liu Bei. Ma Chao's subordinate Pang De, however, remained in Zhang Lu's service.

In 215, Cao Cao again launched a campaign to conquer Hanzhong Commandery. Initially, Zhang Lu had no hope of standing against Cao Cao's armies, and planned to surrender. His younger brother Zhang Wei (張衛), however, insisted on fighting and lead his army against the invading forces. He was soon killed in battle, and again Zhang Lu considered surrendering. His adviser Yan Pu told him that if they surrendered so easily, they would have no position to negotiate from. Instead, Zhang Lu retreated to his fortress at Bazhong (巴中). When leaving his capital, he did not destroy his wealth and treasures, nor attempt to take them with him. Instead, Zhang left them behind, saying "These things belong to the country, not to me." Cao Cao was greatly impressed by this, and sent a messenger to Zhang Lu asking him to surrender. Yan Pu's plan was successful, as Zhang Lu and his forces were warmly welcomed by Cao Cao. Cao Cao appointed Zhang Lu as General who Guards the South (鎮南將軍) and enfeoffed his five sons as marquises. Zhang Lu also married his daughter to Cao Yu, one of Cao Cao's sons. When Cao Cao turned Ma Chao's son Ma Qiu (馬秋) over to Zhang Lu, Zhang Lu personally killed Ma Qiu – most likely as revenge against Ma Chao's desertion.

Zhang Lu died in 216 and was honoured with the posthumous title "Marquis Yuan" (原侯) by the Han imperial court. His sons continued to lead the "Five Pecks of Rice" Taoist Order, which later evolved into one of the two major Taoist schools that survive to modern times known as Zhengyi Dao.

== In Romance of the Three Kingdoms ==
In the 14th-century historical novel Romance of the Three Kingdoms, Zhang Lu is portrayed as strongly craving the title of King of Hanning, and attempting to aggressively expand his territory. In the novel, he attempts to invade Liu Zhang's Yi Province, only to be stopped. When Ma Chao left his service, he sent a servant Yang Bo (楊柏) along to spy on him. However, when Ma Chao joined Liu Bei, he killed Yang Bo.

== See also ==
- Zhang Daoling
- Way of the Celestial Masters
- List of Celestial Masters
- Zhengyi Dao
