= Zhang Daoling =

2nd-century Chinese Taoist leader

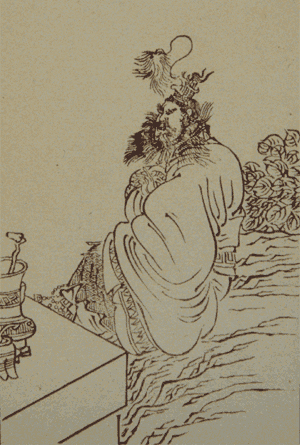
- Zhang Daoling, as illustrated by Ren Xiong and engraved by Cai Zhaochu
- Born: Zhang Ling; February 22, 34 (traditionally)
- Died: October 10, 156 (traditionally, aged 121–122); Mount Qingcheng
- Other name: Fuhao (courtesy name)
- Occupations: Religious leader Ruler of Zhang Han
- Known for: Founder of Way of the Five Pecks of Rice; Founder of religious Taoism

Zhang Daoling
- Traditional Chinese: 張道陵
- Simplified Chinese: 张道陵
- Hanyu Pinyin: Zhāng Dàolíng
Transcriptions
Standard Mandarin
- Hanyu Pinyin: Zhāng Dàolíng
- Wade–Giles: Chang^{1} Tao^{4}-ling^{2}

Zhang Ling (birth name)
- Traditional Chinese: 張陵
- Simplified Chinese: 张陵
- Hanyu Pinyin: Zhāng Líng
Transcriptions
Standard Mandarin
- Hanyu Pinyin: Zhāng Líng
- Wade–Giles: Chang^{1} Ling^{2}

Zhang Fuhan (courtesy name)
- Traditional Chinese: 張輔漢
- Simplified Chinese: 张辅汉
- Hanyu Pinyin: Zhāng Fǔhàn
Transcriptions
Standard Mandarin
- Hanyu Pinyin: Zhāng Fǔhàn
- Wade–Giles: Chang^{1} Fu^{3}-han^{4}

Celestial Master Zhang
- Traditional Chinese: 張天師
- Simplified Chinese: 张天師
- Hanyu Pinyin: Zhāng Tiānshī
Transcriptions
Standard Mandarin
- Hanyu Pinyin: Zhāng Tiānshī
- Wade–Giles: Chang^{1} T'ien^{1}-shih^{1}

Ancestral Celestial Master
- Traditional Chinese: 祖天師
- Simplified Chinese: 祖天师
- Hanyu Pinyin: Zǔ Tiānshī
Transcriptions
Standard Mandarin
- Hanyu Pinyin: Zǔ Tiānshī
- Wade–Giles: Tsu^{3} T'ien^{1}-shih^{1}

Zhengyi Zhenren
- Chinese: 正一真人
- Hanyu Pinyin: Zhèngyī Zhēnrén
- Literal meaning: True Man of the Orthodox Unity
Transcriptions
Standard Mandarin
- Hanyu Pinyin: Zhèngyī Zhēnrén
- Wade–Giles: Cheng^{4}-i^{1} Chen^{1}-jen^{2}

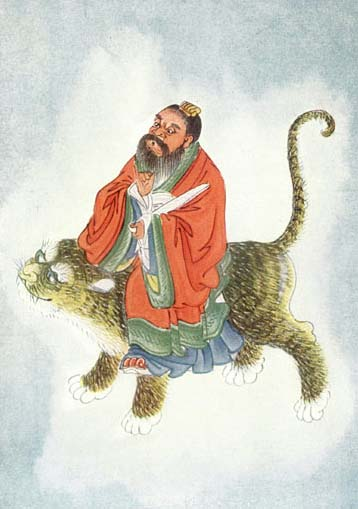
Zhang Daoling as pictured in Myths and Legends of China by E. T. C. Werner

Zhang Daoling (張道陵, traditionally February 22, 34 – October 10, 156), birth name Zhang Ling (張陵), courtesy name Fuhan (輔漢), was a Chinese Taoist religious leader who lived during the Eastern Han dynasty. He founded the Way of the Five Pecks of Rice millenarian movement, and established a theocratic state. The Way of the Celestial Masters grew out of those beginnings, and so Zhang is considered the founder of religious Taoism by scholars and is venerated as such by followers of Zhengyi Dao.

His son Zhang Heng (張衡) and grandson Zhang Lu inherited leadership of the movement and state. Also known as Celestial Master Zhang (張天師), Ancestral Celestial Master (祖天師) or Zhengyi Zhenren (正一真人), Zhang is sometimes pictured riding on a tiger. In some Taoist sects, Zhang, along with Ge Xuan, Xu Xun (許遜) and Sa Shoujian (薩守堅), are called the "Four Celestial Masters" (四大天師).

== Biography ==
The details of the life of the historical figure Zhang Daoling are obscure; most of the information about him comes from later scripture and hagiography. According to these, Zhang traced his ancestral home to Feng County, Jiangsu, and was said to be a descendant of Zhang Liang. He was born in the tenth year of the Jianwu era during the reign of Emperor Guangwu of Han. He started reading the Tao Te Ching at a young age and studied in the Taixue (Imperial Academy) before. He served as a magistrate in Jiangzhou, Ba Commandery (present-day Chongqing) during the reign of Emperor Ming of Han.

Zhang later retired and led a reclusive life at Mount Beimang, where he practiced taoist methods of achieving longevity. When invited to serve as a boshi (equivalent of a present-day professor) in the Imperial Academy, he claimed that he was ill. Emperor He of Han summoned him thrice to serve as the Taifu (Imperial Tutor) but he refused again.

According to hagiographies compiled in approximately 400 C.E., in 142 C.E. the deity Taishang Laojun (a deified Laozi) revealed to Zhang on Mount Heming the "Doctrine of the Orthodox One [Resting On] the Authority of the Alliance" (pinyin: zhengyi mengwei dao), and bestowed upon him the title Celestial Master. The deity warned that plagues, beasts, and the demons of the Three Offices and Six Heavens of the underworld were due to be released upon humankind, and that only 240,000 people would be chosen as survivors and "seed people" (pinyin: zhongmin) to populate the new age, the era of Great Peace.

Zhang then endeavored to reform supposedly degenerate religious practices. After gathering numerous followers, he started a health cult that advocated certain longevity practices, recorded in books which have been lost. He founded a theocratic state in Sichuan organized into 24 parishes, later 28, which outsiders called the Way of Five Pecks of Rice, after a tax of that amount levied on followers.

A major change instituted by the new Covenant was the rejection of food and animal sacrifices. According to Zhang, the updated teachings of Laozi included the first true Taoist religious pantheon as distinguished from the prior ancient religion of China. The Xiang'er, a commentary on the Tao Te Ching preserved today in a sixth-century manuscript, is traditionally ascribed to Zhang Daoling's authorship and even if not his work may reflect his teachings.

Zhang is said to have died on Mount Qingcheng in 156 during the reign of Emperor Huan of Han at the purported age of 123. However, it is also said that Zhang did not die but ascended in broad daylight (Xiandao). Zhang reportedly disappeared on the day of his death, leaving nothing behind but his clothes.

== Descendants ==
His descendants have held the title of Celestial Masters up to the present day, with the most recent claimants of the title currently residing in mainland China and Taiwan. They also held the title of 正一嗣教眞人 zhèng yī sìjiào zhēnrén.

== See also ==
- List of Celestial Masters
- Way of the Five Pecks of Rice
- Way of the Celestial Masters
- Zhengyi Dao
