= Li Babai =

Taoist immortal and founder of Lijia Dao

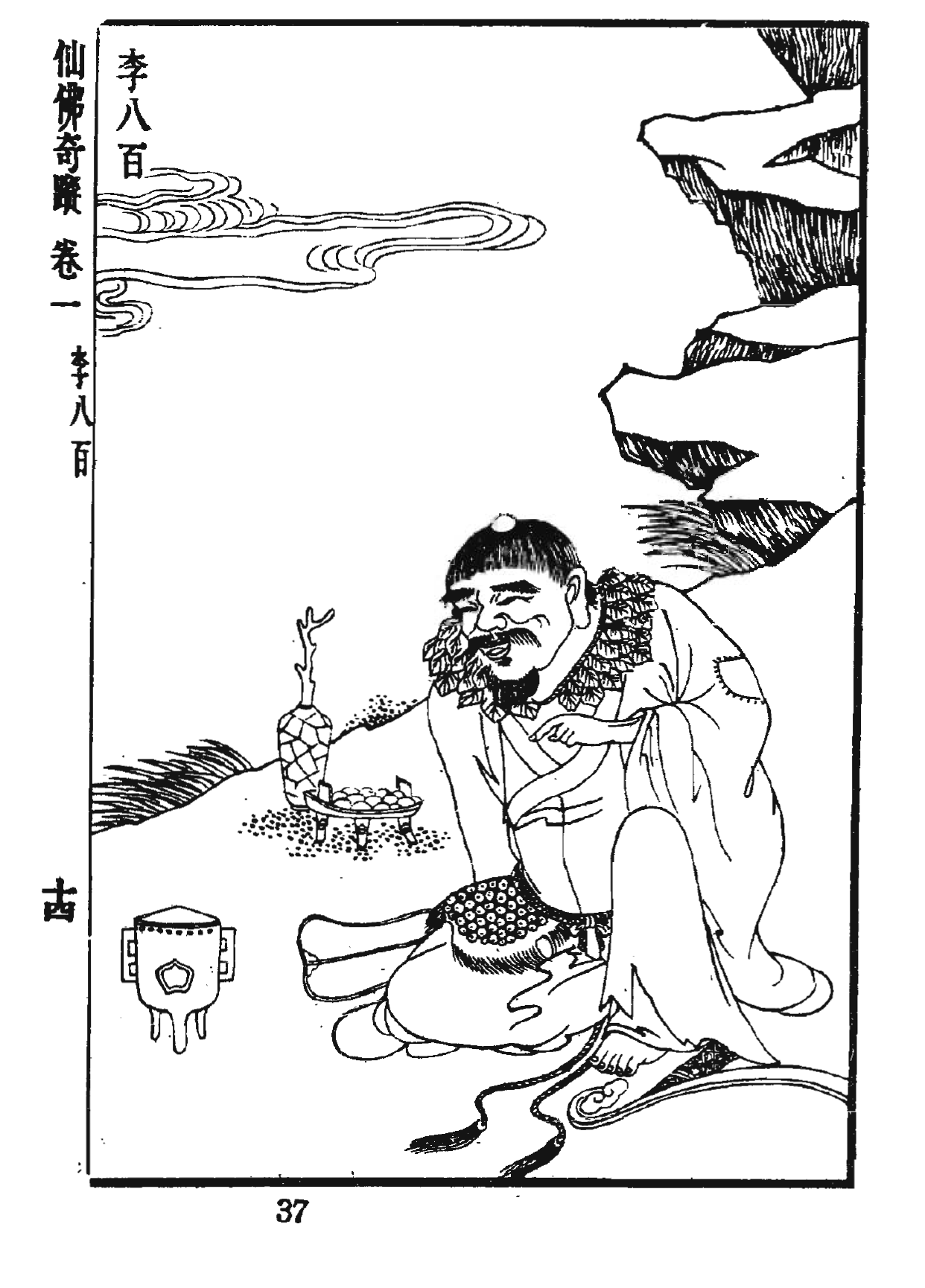
- Li Babai, Hong Zicheng's 1602 Xianfo qizong (仙佛奇蹤, "Marvelous Traces of Transcendents and Buddhas")

Chinese name
- Chinese: 李八百
Transcriptions
Standard Mandarin
- Hanyu Pinyin: Lǐ Bābǎi
- Wade–Giles: Li Pa-pai
Yue: Cantonese
- Jyutping: Lei^{5} Baat^{3}baak^{3}
Middle Chinese
- Middle Chinese: LiX Pɛtpæk
Old Chinese
- Baxter–Sagart (2014): C.rəʔ Pˤretpˤrak

Korean name
- Hangul: 이팔백
- Hanja: 李八百
Transcriptions
- Revised Romanization: I Palbaek
- McCune–Reischauer: I P'albaek

Japanese name
- Kanji: 李八百
- Hiragana: りはっぴゃく
Transcriptions
- Revised Hepburn: Ri Happyaku

Li Babai (Chinese: 李八百; trans. "Li Eight-Hundred") was the sobriquet of a Daoist elixir-master and xian ("transcendent; 'immortal'") who supposedly lived more than 800 years. The founder of the Way of the Li Family school of religious Daoism, Li A (李阿, fl. 229–259 CE) or Babaisui gong (八百歲公; "Sir Eight-Hundred-Years-Old") is associated with Li Babai. Two unscrupulous Daoist adepts surnamed Li exploited the pseudonym Li Babai. Li Kuan (李寬, fl. early 4th century) was a charlatan faith healer and who died from the plague, and Li Tuo (李脫) was a sorcerer who was executed in 324 for plotting a revolt against the Jin dynasty.

== Names ==
The Chinese name Lǐ Bābǎi combines the common surname Lǐ (李; 'plum', 'Prunus salicina') and the hao (號; "pseudonym, sobriquet, nickname given to oneself") Babai (八百; "eight hundred, 800"). "Eight hundred years old" is a Literary Chinese trope for the lifespan of a Daoist xian transcendent. The Baopuzi says Peng Zu lived 800 years and Anqi Sheng lived over 3,000, "but in the end they did not escape death". Many cultures have longevity myths, for instance, the Hebrew Bible says Noah's lifespan was 950 years and Methuselah's was 969 years.

The Li surname is traditionally associated with Daoism, for instance the fangshi ("master of methods") and alchemist Li Shaojun (fl. 133 BCE), the astronomer and historian Li Chunfeng (602-670), and the philosopher Li Rong (fl. 658-663). Laozi's personal name was supposedly Li Er (李耳), and the Li family claims to be patrilineally descended from him.

Multiple "Li Eight-Hundreds" has a parallel in Daoist eschatology, Li Hong (李弘) was the predicted name of Laozi as the messiah who would appear at the end of the world cycle, and several prophets assumed this alias attempting to legitimize insurgency or rebellion.

== Sources ==
The earliest biographical information about Li Babai is contained in two texts attributed to the Daoist scholar and author Ge Hong (284-364); the 317 Baopuzi ("[Book of the] Master Who Embraces Simplicity") conflates Li Babai with Li A and the Shenxian Zhuan ("Traditions of Divine Transcendents") identifies them as separate individuals. The latest reference to a Daoist "Li Eight-Hundred" is found in the 1346 History of Song. Emperor Huizong was a patron of the arts, and during the Chongning era (1102–1106) he sought to reform ancient yayue court music. Since the Classic of Music was no longer extant, the emperor assembled musical experts, including ninety-year-old Wei Hanjin (魏漢津), who is recorded to have been the disciple of the transcendent Li Liang (李良), also known as Li Babai.

=== Baopuzi ===
The Baopuzi says Babaisui gong (八百歲公; "Eight-Hundred-Year-Old Sire") was the sobriquet of the famous Daoist xian transcendent Li A (李阿, fl. 229-25 from Shu (present-day Sichuan), who founded the Way of the Li Family school. Ge Hong says, "Someone asked when this Way of the Li clan (李氏之道; Lishi zhi dao) began. I replied: During the reign of the Grand Emperor of Wu (Sun Quan, r. 229-252), there was a certain Li A in Shu. He lived in a cave and did not eat. Successive generations saw him, so they styled him the Eight-Hundred-Year-Old Sire [八百歲公; Babaisui gong]." Ware's translation of the Baopuzi renders Babaisui gong as "Sir Eight Hundred"

About a century later, the Baopuzi says the Daoist faith healer Li Kuan (李寬) also from Shu appeared and became popular in Eastern Wu (Jiangsu and part of Zhejiang). "He knew how to treat illnesses with holy water that produced many cures. Then the rumor spread both far and near that he was no other than Li A, so they called him Li The Eight Hundred [李八百], but in reality he was not Li A." According to Ge's report, other relatively successful fake prophets named Li also appeared.

=== Shenxian zhuan ===
The received edition of the Shenxian zhuan combines an original 4th-century text written by Ge Hong with many later additions dating up to the Song dynasty (960-1279). The research of Shenxian zhuan scholar and translator Robert Ford Campany reveals that the Li Babai material is reliably attested by the year 500, representing the earliest textual stratum.

This Shenxian zhuan hagiography of Li Babai begins with the standard trope of a transcendent's origins and activities.

Li Babai (Li "Eight Hundred") was a native of Shu. No one knew his given name. Successive generations had seen him, and people of the day calculated his age to be eight hundred, hence his sobriquet. Sometimes he secluded himself in the mountains, and sometimes he appeared in the markets.

The ancient Shu state was in present-day Sichuan province, and Li Babai is one of the Eight Immortals from Sichuan.

Most of Li Babai's account centers around dramatically testing his future disciple Tang Gongfang to determine if he was worthy of teaching. Since the early first century C.E., Tang Gongfang was a regional god, with temples at several locations. An Eastern Han stele inscription commemorating the refurbishing of a temple dedicated to Tang in his native Chenggu survived until at least the late Qing dynasty (Ouyang Xiu mentions the stone in 1064).

He knew that Tang Gongfang 唐公房 of Hanzhong had determination [to study the Way] but had not found an enlightened teacher. Li wished to teach Tang and transmit texts to him, so he first went to test him. He pretended to be a hired servant, and Tang Gongfang did not realize [who he really was]. Li hustled about his work and was diligent, quite different from other hired personnel; Tang was fond of him and wondered at him. Li then pretended to fall ill and to be near death. Tang hired a physician to compound drugs for him, spending several hundred thousand pieces of cash but not considering it a loss. Tang's concern for Li showed on his face. Li then manifested ugly ulcers on every part of his body; these disgusting sores oozed blood and pus, and no one could bear to go near him. Tang shed tears for him and said, "You have worked diligently as a messenger for my household for many years; you were always speedy. I hired the doctor to try to cure you, and I have no regrets about having done so, but still you are not well. What else can I do for you?" Li responded, "ulcers will not be cured unless someone licks them. That should work." So Tang sent in three maidservants to lick his sores. Li then said, "The maidservants' licking has not cured me. But I can be cured if you will do it yourself." So Tang licked him, but again to no effect. Li then said that it would be most beneficial to have Tang's wife lick him. Tang ordered his wife to do it. Afterward, Li declared, "My ulcers will heal if I can obtain thirty hu of fine liquor to bathe in." Tang prepared the liquor for him, pouring it into a large vessel, and Li bathed in it; and now his sores were finally healed. His body resembled congealed fat, and he bore no trace of illness.

Ningzhi (凝脂, "congealed fat") means "smooth, soft, and creamy skin".

Li Babai then reveals himself to Tang and transmits an unnamed text on waidan external alchemy that Tang successfully uses to make an immortality elixir.

"I am a transcendent. You possess determination, so I have tested you by these means, and you have truly proven worthy to be taught. I will now transmit to you instructions for transcending the world." He then had Tang, his wife, and the three maidservants who had licked him bathe in the liquor he himself had bathed in, and they all reverted to youth, their countenances perfect and pleasing. Afterward, he transmitted a scripture on Daoist elixirs [丹經] in one fascicle to Tang. Tang entered Cloud Terrace Mountain to make the drug. When it was complete, he ingested it and departed as a transcendent.

Other textual versions of the Tang Gongfang legend emphasize that he took along his entire household, including dogs and chickens, when he achieved xian-hood and soared into heaven. Ge Hong, with his agenda of proving that alchemical elixirs are the preferred method to becoming a transcendent, does not mention this element, and distinguishes between his wife and maidservants merely "reverting to youth" in the wine bath, while Tang alone departs into transcendence.

The Shenxian zhuan hagiography of She Zheng (涉正), a native of eastern Ba (eastern Sichuan) who always kept his eyes closed, says Li Babai described him as "a lad of four hundred."

=== Jin Shu ===
The 648 Jin Shu history of the Eastern Jin dynasty (318-419) records a Daoist practitioner named Li Tuo (李脫) or Li Babai:

His sorcery deceived the masses. He pretended to be eight hundred years old and consequently was nicknamed Li Babai (李八百). In the region between Zhongzhou (中州) and Jianye (建鄴), he healed the sick with demonic methods (鬼道; guidao) and invested people with official appointments. In those days many people put their trust in him and served him. His younger brother (or disciple 弟子; dizi) Li Hong (李弘), who assembled followers on Mount Xin (灊山), proclaimed: "According to a prophecy I shall be King (應讖當王; yingchan dang wang). …After two feuding officials accused Li Tuo and Li Hong of having plotted rebellion, they were tried and executed in 324, "The magician (術人; shuren) Li Tuo seduced the crowd with magic writings (妖書; yaoshu) of his own fabrication. He was beheaded in the marketplace of Jiankang (建康)."

There are similarities between the Way of the Li Family and activities of Li Tuo and Li Hong a few decades later. Both movements attracted followers through healing, particularly with talismans, and claiming supernatural longevity. Namely, Li A as "Sir Eight Hundred" and then Li Kuan and Li Tuo as "Li Eight Hundred". A major difference is that while the Way of the Li Family was not associated with any politico-religious aspirations, Li Hong referred to a prophecy that he would become king. Nevertheless, there is no historical proof that Li Tuo belonged to the Way of the Li Family, and this tradition is too scarcely documented in primary sources to allow for anything more than conjectures.

The Northern Wei court's Celestial Master Kou Qianzhi wrote the 415 Laojun yinsong jiejing (老君音誦誡經; "Classic on Precepts of Lord Lao, Recited [to the Melody in the Clouds]") that denounced diviners who called themselves Li and abused the people. Several prophets who called themselves Li or Li Hong (李弘, Laozi's appellation as the messiah) arose in south China, especially in the Wu and Shu regions. Some of them led popular, millenarian-type rebellions and were executed for deceiving the masses and causing social disorder. Most of them belonged to the Lijia dao, a "long-lasting sect" that spread throughout southern China during the Six Dynasties (220-589), and was condemned as heterodox by the Daoists themselves.

"Even if there is no evidence of a direct historical link between the various "Li Eight Hundreds"—Li A in Sichuan, Li Kuan, and Li Tuo in the East—a sectarian tradition connected with the surname Li must have had some reputation at the beginning of the fourth century".
