= Li A =

Legendary Daoist immortal

- Li A in ancient Bronze script

Chinese name
- Chinese: 李阿
Transcriptions
Standard Mandarin
- Hanyu Pinyin: Lǐ Ā
- Wade–Giles: Li A
Yue: Cantonese
- Jyutping: Lei^{5} Aa^{3}
Middle Chinese
- Middle Chinese: LiX ʔA
Old Chinese
- Baxter–Sagart (2014): C.rəʔ Qˁar

Korean name
- Hangul: 이아
- Hanja: 李阿
Transcriptions
- McCune–Reischauer: I A

Japanese name
- Kanji: 李阿
- Hiragana: りあ
Transcriptions
- Revised Hepburn: Ri A

Li A (李阿, fl. 229–259) was a legendary Daoist xian ("transcendent; 'immortal'") and diviner who founded of the Way of the Li Family, which was one of the oldest schools of religious Daoism that was popular throughout South China during the Six Dynasties (220–589). Owing to his extraordinary lifespan, Li A's sobriquet was Babaisui gong (八百歲公, "Sir Eight-Hundred-Years-Old"), which resulted in confusion or conflation with several other transcendents, one named Li Babai (李八百, "Li Eight-Hundred[-Years-Old]"), and the charlatan Li Tuo (李脫) who took the name Li Babai.

== Names ==
The Chinese name Lǐ Ā combines the common surname Lǐ (李; 'plum', 'Prunus salicina') and the given name Ā (阿: frequently used in Chinese kinship terms, e.g., 阿妈; Āmā; "mom; mommy"; and transliterations, 阿彌陀佛; Āmítuófó; "Amitābha". In addition to ā, this character was originally pronounced 阿; ē; "mountain slope; embankment").

The Li surname is traditionally associated with Daoism, for instance the fangshi ("master of methods") and alchemist Li Shaojun (fl. 133 BCE), the astronomer and historian Li Chunfeng (602-670), and the philosopher Li Rong (fl. 658-663). Laozi's personal name was supposedly Li Er (李耳), and the Li family claims to be patrilineally descended from him.

== Sources ==
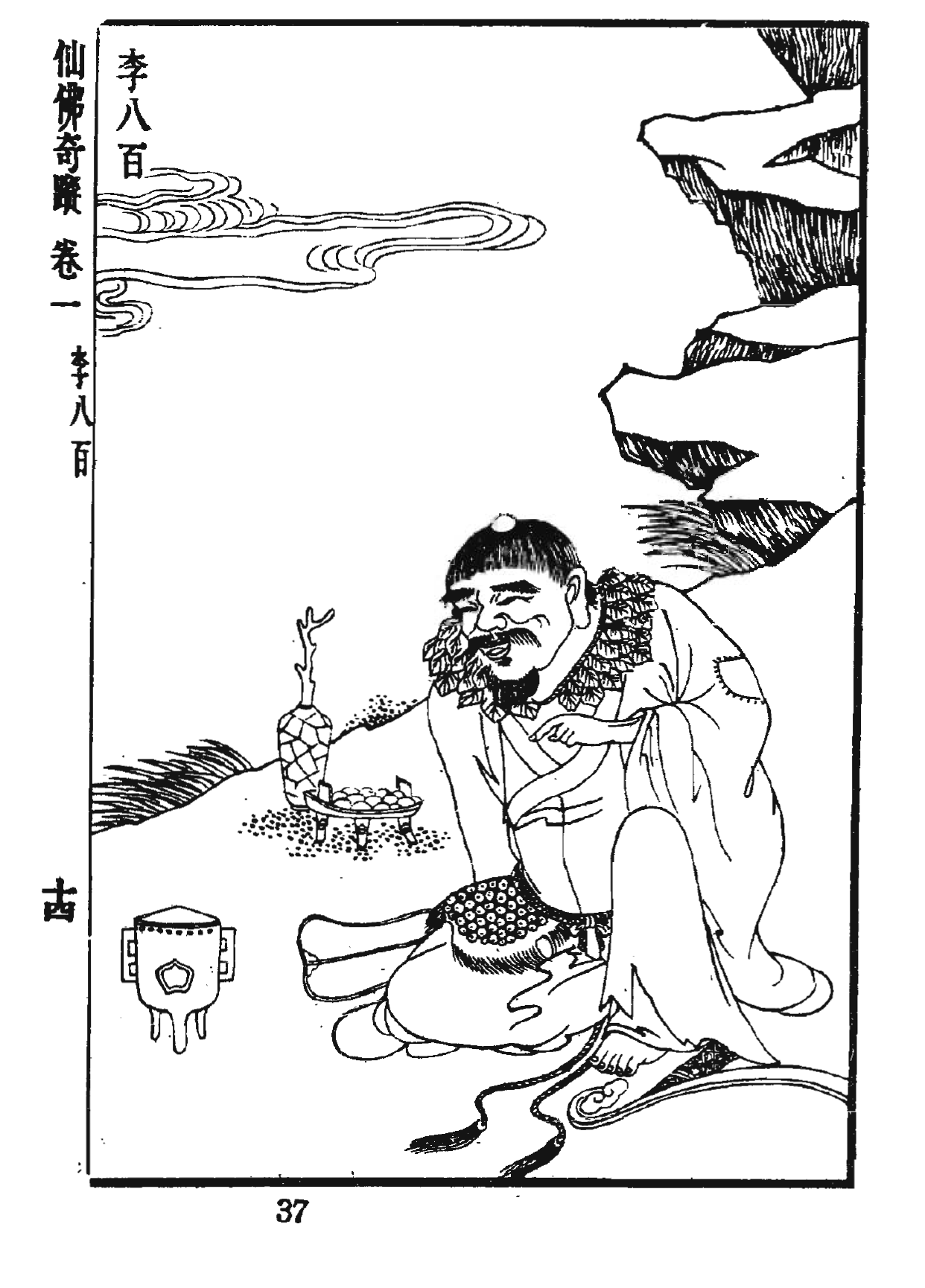
Woodcut illustration of Li Babai, Hong Zicheng's 1602 Xianfo qizong (仙佛奇蹤; "Marvelous Traces of Transcendents and Buddhas")

The earliest biographical information about Li A is contained in two texts attributed to the Daoist scholar and author Ge Hong (284-364), the 317 Baopuzi ("[Book of the] Master Who Embraces Simplicity") and the later Shenxian Zhuan ("Traditions of Divine Transcendents").

=== Baopuzi ===
The Baopuzi description of Li A from the western state of Shu (Sichuan Province) is in a context between two other passages about the Daoist Way of the Li Family. The preceding one contrasts popular heterodox yaodao (妖道; "demonic cults") that practiced blood sacrifice with the Li Family school (李家道; Lijia dao) that prepared bloodless chu "Kitchen" communal banquets. The subsequent passage describes a contemporary charlatan healer named Li Kuan (李寬) who pretended to be Li A and had over a thousand followers, yet died from a plague while trying to heal himself.

Someone asked when this Way of the Li clan (Lishi zhi dao 李氏之道) began. I replied: During the reign of the Grand Emperor of Wu (Sun Quan, r. 229-252), there was a certain Li A in Shu. He lived in a cave and did not eat. Successive generations saw him, so they styled him the Eight-Hundred-Year-Old Sire [Babaisui gong 八百歲公]. People often came to him to consult him on affairs, but Li A would say nothing. But they had only to divine by his facial expression: if he wore a pleased expression, affairs would all be auspicious; if he wore a troubled look, then affairs would all be inauspicious. If he smiled, it meant there would be a great felicity, and if he sighed, it meant deep trouble was near. They watched him for these signs, and the signs never missed. Later, he suddenly departed one day, no one knew where to.

James R. Ware translates Babaisui gong as "Sir Eight Hundred".

"Exploitation of Li A's name was considerable." A century later, the Baopuzi says he reportedly reappeared in the region of Wu (Jiangsu and part of Zhejiang) under the pretext of a certain Li Kuan (李寬). This new Li Babai (李八百, Li Eight-Hundred), who also came from Shu and was a diviner, became extremely popular in the southern Yangzi region. According to Ge's report, other more or less successful fake prophets named Li also appeared.

=== Shenxian zhuan ===
The received edition of the Shenxian zhuan combines an original 4th-century text written by Ge Hong with many later accretions dating up to the Song dynasty (960-1279). The research of Shenxian zhuan scholar and translator Robert Ford Campany demonstrates that the Li A material is reliably attested by the year 650.

This Shenxian zhuan hagiography of Li A is divisible into two parts. The former part roughly corresponds with the Baopuzi hagiography. Both record that Li was from the state of Shu, never appeared to age according to several generations of witnesses, and used a nonverbal method of divination to answer questions about the future. The Shenxian zhuan version omits that Li A lived in a cave and practiced Daoist xian techniques of bigu "grain avoidance" fasting to achieve xian transcendence; it adds information about Li A begging in the marketplace of the Shu capitol Chengdu,

Li A was a native of Shu. Successive generations had reported seeing him and noted that he had not aged from one time to the next. He habitually begged in the Chengdu market, and whatever he was given he distributed in turn to the poor. He would leave in the evening and return in the morning, and the people in the market never knew where he spent the nights. Some went to consult him on affairs, but Li A would say nothing. But they had only to divine by his facial expression: if he appeared happy, then their affairs were all auspicious; if he wore a sorrowful look, then they were all inauspicious; if he smiled, it meant there would be a great felicity; and if he sighed, it meant deep trouble was near. They watched him for these signs, and the signs never missed.

Two features of this Li A story resemble the Way of the Celestial Masters traditions and the Way of the Li Family school is associated with the Southern Celestial Masters. The early Celestial Master community collected donations of rice from its practitioners and fed the needy; Li A begged in the Chengdu marketplace and gave the proceeds to the poor. The Celestial Master religion prohibited using divination techniques and even possessing prognostication manuals; Li A does not use any method of divination, and refuses to speak of future matters, however his facial expressions reveal to questioners whether a matter will be auspicious or inauspicious.

The latter part of Li A's Shenxian zhuan hagiography includes a narrative about testing his lay follower Gu Qiang (古强), and specifies that Li was summoned to Kunlun mountain, the axis mundi in Chinese mythology, a place where adepts go to become transcendents, and never seen again, as opposed to the Baopuzi saying he departed to an unknown location.

The Baopuzi also mentions Gu Qiang, ostensibly a contemporary of Ge Hong, as a Daoist herbalist practitioner who appeared to be a healthy eighty-year-old, and criticizes him for pretending to be thousands of years old. Gu became famous and wealthy from telling exaggerated stories about having personally met mythical sages including Emperor Yao and Emperor Shun.

There was a certain Gu Qiang 古强 who suspected that Li A was no ordinary man. He often drew near to him and served him, and once he decided to try following Li A back [from the market] to the place where he spent his nights. It turned out to be on Green Citadel Mountain. Gu Qiang later decided to follow Li A all the way out there, but he did not know the route personally, and he feared that there were tigers and wolves, so he secretly stowed his father's sword. Li A saw him and angrily said, "You're walking behind me. Why do you fear tigers?" He seized Gu Qiang's sword and struck it against a stone, breaking it in two. Now Gu Qiang fretted over the sword's being broken. The next morning, when he was following Li A back into the city, Li turned to him and asked, "Are you fretting over the sword's being broken" Gu explained that he feared his father would think it strange and would grow angry at him. Li then took the sword and, holding it in his left hand, struck the earth with it, and the sword returned to its former state.

As Gu Qiang proceeded to follow Li A back to Chengdu, along the way they met up with a man driving a carriage and team at high speed. Li placed his feet beneath the path of the carriage, and they were severed and he died there. Gu was terrified and watched over him. In a little while, Li got up and rubbed his feet with his hands, whereupon they returned to normal.

Gu Qiang was then eighteen, and Li A appeared to be around fifty. When Gu had passed eighty, Li had not changed at all. Later Li A told someone that he must go, that he had been summoned to Mount Kunlun. He never returned.
