= Way of the Li Family =

Daoist denomination

Lijia Dao
- Lijia dao in ancient Seal script

Chinese name
- Chinese: 李家道
- Literal meaning: Li family way
Transcriptions
Standard Mandarin
- Hanyu Pinyin: Lǐjiā dào
- Wade–Giles: Li-chia tao
Yue: Cantonese
- Jyutping: Lei^{5} gaa^{1} dou^{6}
Middle Chinese
- Middle Chinese: LiX kæ dawX
Old Chinese
- Baxter–Sagart (2014): C.rəʔ kˁra kə.lˁuʔ

Korean name
- Hangul: 이가도
- Hanja: 李家道
Transcriptions
- McCune–Reischauer: I ga do

Japanese name
- Kanji: 李家道
- Hiragana: りかどう
Transcriptions
- Revised Hepburn: Ri ka dō

Way of the Li Family (Chinese: 李家道; pinyin: Lǐjiā dào) was one of the oldest schools of religious Daoism and was popular throughout South China during the Six Dynasties (220–589). The school was founded by Li A. Since several Way of the Li Family practices resembled those of the Way of the Celestial Masters, such as healing with (fu) amulets and holding expensive chu "Kitchen" feasts, the sect is associated with the Southern Celestial Masters. Mainstream Daoist schools denounced the Way of the Li Family as heterodox, particularly for its charlatan healers who claimed extraordinary longevity. For instance, Li Tuo (李脫) or Li Babai (李八百, 'Li Eight-Hundred[-Years-Old]') and his disciple Li Hong (李弘) were executed in 324 for practicing sorcery and plotting rebellion.

== Names ==
The name Lijia dao (李家道) is a compound of three Chinese words:

1. Lǐ (李), lit. 'plum, Prunus salicina '), a common Chinese surname;
2. jiā (家), 'residence, home; household, family; school of thought, lineage, tradition';
3. dao (道), 'road, route, pathway; the Way, fundamental reality; method, practice; ideas and teachings'.

Two other names with the Classical Chinese grammatical possessive marker zhī (之) were Lijia zhi dao (李家之道) and Lishi zhi dao (李氏之道, lit. 'Li Clan's Way').

The surname Li is associated with Daoism, for instance the fangshi ('master of methods') and alchemist Li Shaojun (fl. 133 BCE), the astronomer and historian Li Chunfeng (602–670), and the philosopher Li Rong (fl. 658–663). Laozi's personal name is traditionally said to have been Li Er (李耳), and the Li family claims to be patrilineally descended from him. The House of Li was the ruling family of the Western Liang (400–421) and Tang dynasty (618–907).

== Translations ==
Lijia dao (李家道) is variously translated as:

- 'doctrine of the Lis'
- 'Tao of the Li Family'
- 'religion of the adepts of Li'
- 'Way of the Li House'
- 'Way of the Li clan'
- 'Sect of the Li Adepts'
- 'Way of the Li Family'
- 'Way of the Li Lineage'

Within this sample of English translations, only Li is consistently rendered. Jia is translated as 'family', 'clan', 'lineage', and 'adepts' (see Chinese kin and Chinese lineage association). Dao is generally interpreted as 'the Dao' or 'the Way', consistent with other Daoist schools of the first centuries CE, such as Way of the Five Pecks of Rice, Way of the Celestial Masters, Way of the Orthodox Unity, and Way of the Great Peace.

== History ==
The Way of the Li Family originated in the states of Shu (present-day Sichuan) and Eastern Wu (Jiangsu and part of Zhejiang) during a turbulent historical period when many northern Chinese families that practiced the Way of the Celestial Masters Daoism fled to the south. This diaspora began in 260 when Jin dynasty conquered the Cao Wei kingdom (location of Zhang Daoling's original Celestial Masters theocratic state), and in 311 when the Xiongnu and other non-Han ethnic groups sacked the Jin capital of Luoyang. Remnants of the Luoyang court and the Jin ruling house established the new Eastern Jin dynasty, with the capital city of Jiankang (Nanjing). The Way of the Li Family developed at the "fringe of the main Daoist movements" in the first centuries CE.

The Way of the Li Family's reputation was irreparably damaged by charlatans and diviners, and this Daoist school did not last long. Two egregious Daoists named Li led their followers to believe they were Li Babai (李八百, 'Li Eight-Hundred'), Li Kuan (李寬) who died after failing to heal himself, and Li Tuo (李脫) who was executed in 324, along with his disciple Li Hong (李弘), for practicing witchcraft and plotting rebellion.

=== Baopuzi ===
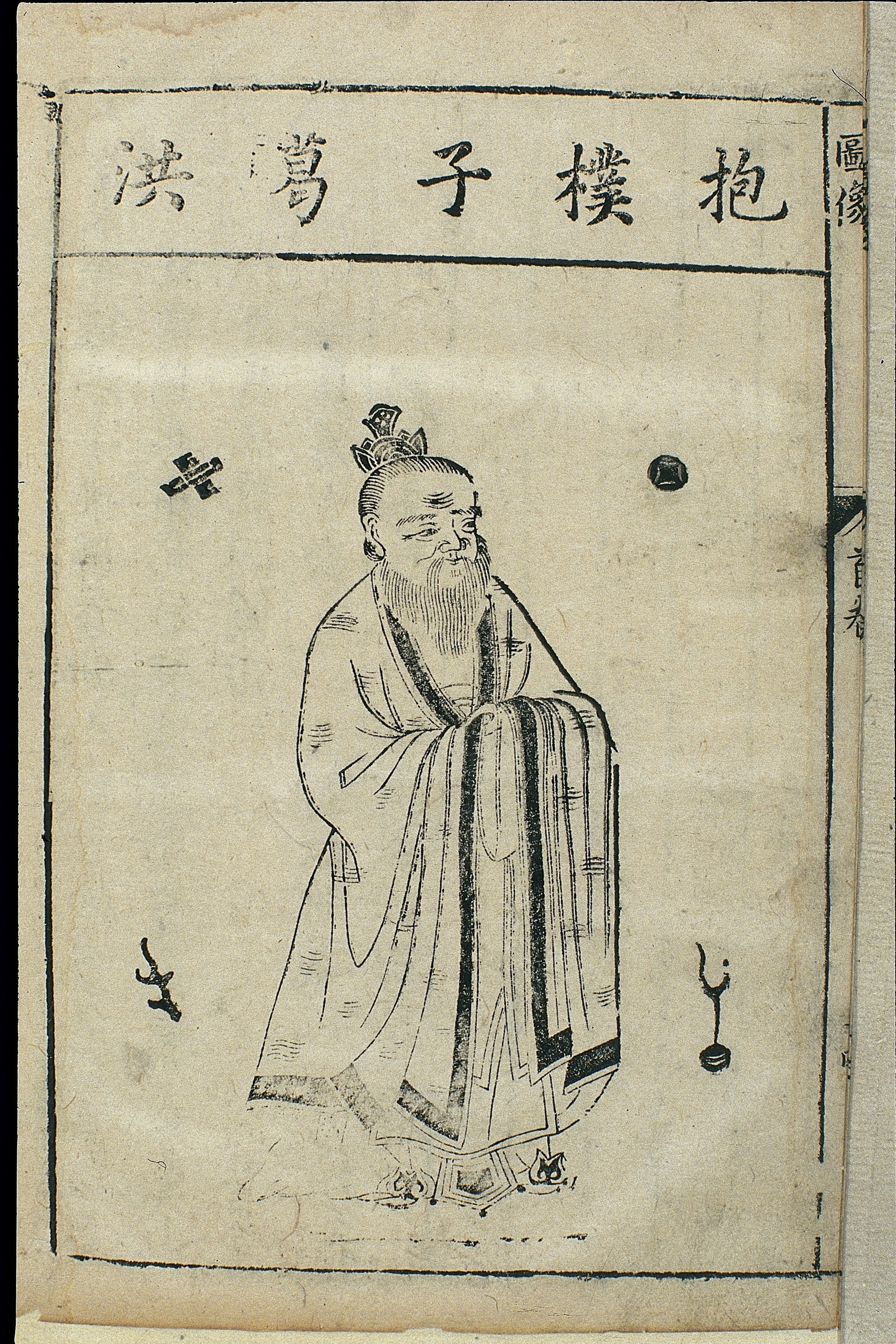
Woodcut print of Ge Hong, Gan Bozong (甘伯宗), Tang dynasty (618–907)

Ge Hong's 317 Baopuzi ('Master Who Embraces Simplicity') has the oldest extant references to the Way of the Li Family. They occur in a context (chapter 9, Daoyi [道意] 'The Meaning of "the Way"') where Ge argued against many ancient customs of Chinese folk religion, including shamanism and sacrifices. He explained his personal "conviction that ghosts and gods have no power" and dismissed all sacrifices to temple gods as useless.

Three consecutive Baopuzi passages discuss the Way of the Li Family. The first contrasts heterodox yaodao (妖道, 'demonic cults') that sacrificed animals to gods believed to enjoy their blood with the Daoist Lijia dao that prepared profligate chu "Kitchen" communal banquets. The second passage traces the Way of the Li Family's origins to a diviner and healer named Li A (李阿, fl. 229–252), originally from Shu (present-day Sichuan Province), whose extraordinary longevity earned him the epithet Li Babai (李八百, 'Li Eight-Hundred[-Years-Old]'). In the lengthy third passage, Ge Hong describes a contemporary charlatan healer named Li Kuan (李寬). Many people identified him as Li A, and he had over a thousand devoted followers, yet died while praying to heal himself from a plague.

The first passage about the Way of the Li Family praises the Daoist school for not practicing blood sacrifice but blames it for holding extravagant communal feasts:

There are more than a hundred bogus Ways (妖道, yaodao) that rely on slaughtering living things and feeding their blood [to ghosts and spirits]. Only the Way of the Li clan, with its nonparticipation [in such cults], is slightly different. But, although it does not butcher victims, whenever it holds its blessing feasts (福食, fushi) there are no limits; in the provisions they buy in the markets they strive for the most sumptuous, and they insist on buying the choicest and rarest items. Several dozen people sometimes do the kitchen work. The expenses are high. Such practices, too, are not quite purely disinterested, and they ought to be included among those which are forbidden.

It was the northern emigration and the establishment of the Eastern Jin that made it socially respectable for the southern aristocracy to take up the Way of the Celestial Master and make it their own. "The relatively low social status of the Celestial Masters in the south prior to 317 is enough to account for Ge Hong's apparent ignorance, or his misportrayal of them as the Way of the Li House [...] in fact, Ge may have been less ignorant of the Celestial Masters than is normally imagined."

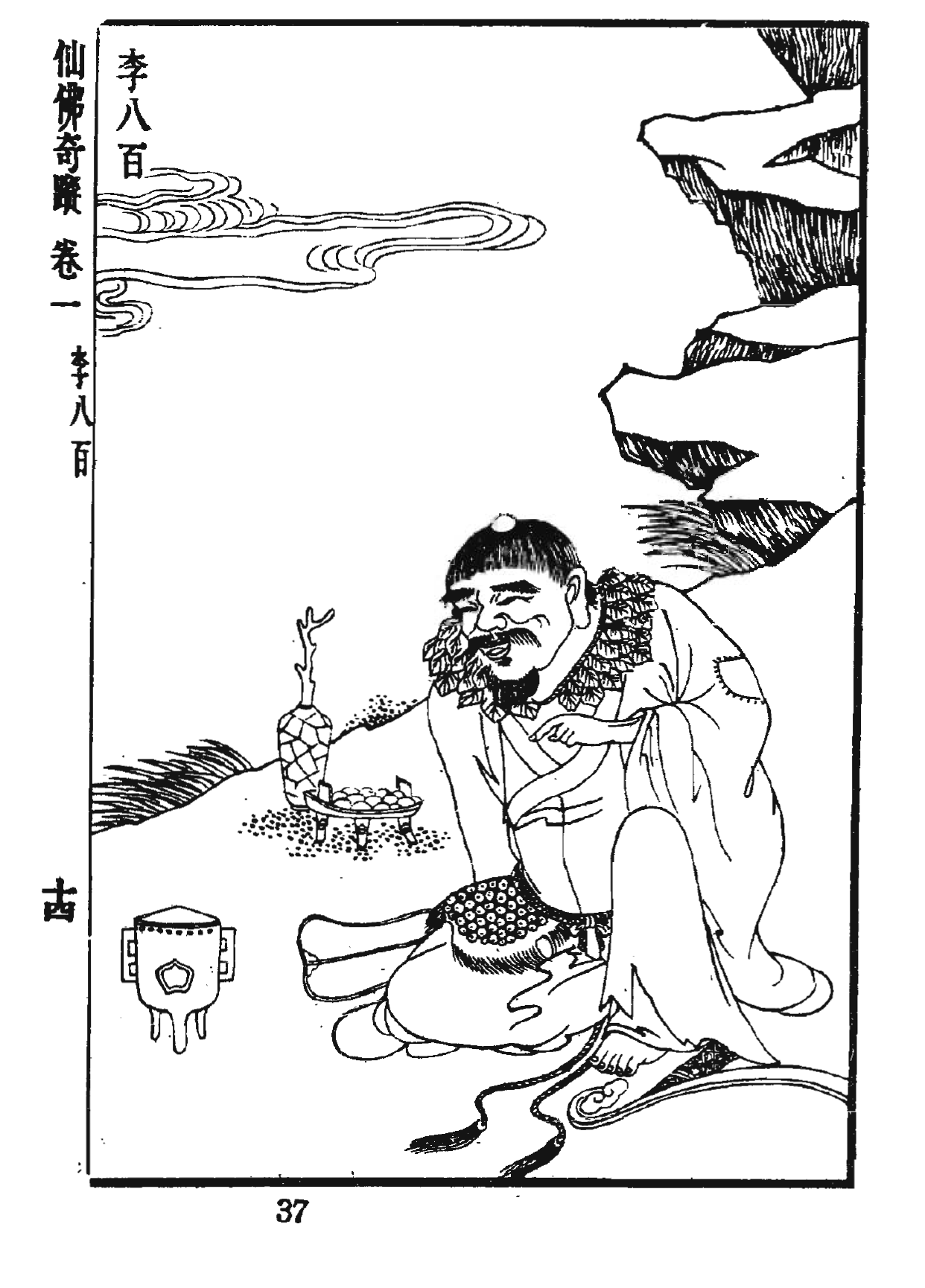
Woodcut illustration of Li Babai, Hong Zicheng's 1602 Xianfo qizong (仙佛奇蹤, 'Marvelous Traces of Transcendents and Buddhas')

The second Baopuzi passage describes the founder of the Way of the Li Family, the diviner Li A, who came from the western state of Shu (Sichuan Province).

Someone asked when this Way of the Li clan began. I replied: During the reign of the Grand Emperor of Wu [Sun Quan, reigned 229–252], there was a certain Li A in Shu. He lived in a cave and did not eat. Successive generations saw him, so they styled him the Eight-Hundred-Year-Old Sire [Babaisui gong]. People often came to him to consult him on affairs, but Li A would say nothing. But they had only to divine by his facial expression: if he wore a pleased expression, affairs would all be auspicious; if he wore a troubled look, then affairs would all be inauspicious. If he smiled, it meant there would be a great felicity, and if he sighed, it meant deep trouble was near. They watched him for these signs, and the signs never missed. Later, he suddenly departed one day, no one knew where to.

James R. Ware translates yaodao as 'ways for dealing with demons', fushi as 'good-luck food", and Babaisui gong as 'Sir Eight Hundred'.

In the third and longest Baopuzi passage about the Way of the Li Family, Ge Hong describes a popular charlatan faith healer and self-styled Daoist xian (仙, 'transcendent, immortal') named Li Kuan (李寬), who like Li A also came from Shu and became popular in Wu.

He knew how to treat illnesses with holy water that produced many cures. Then the rumor spread both far and near that he was no other than Li A, so they called him Li The Eight Hundred [李八百], but in reality he was not Li A.

People "flocked to his door in droves", and Li Kuan had almost a thousand disciples, whom he instructed in simple practices such as using holy water and magic amulets, daoyin calisthenics (導引), and xingqi (行氣, 'breath circulation'), but not the esoteric techniques of bigu fasting and Daoist alchemical elixirs necessary for achieving longevity and xian transcendence. Ge Hong said he was "personally acquainted with many" witnesses who attended his healing rituals, and they were "unanimous in saying that he was weak with old age and emaciated", was frail and toothless, had bad eyesight and hearing, and becoming senile. "He was no different from the ordinary run of men. People kept saying, however, that he deliberately acted normally in order to deceive others, but that could hardly be so." In the early fourth century, there was a severe plague in south China with more than fifty percent mortality. Li Kuan contracted the epidemic disease, and announced that he would enter his lu (廬; 'hut, Daoist meditation room') in order to fast and purify himself, whereupon he died. His followers, repeatedly claimed that he had transformed into a xian transcendent" by means of shijie (屍解; 'release as a corpse') and had not truly died. Ge Hong says Daoist transcendents differ from ordinary people in the value placed upon not growing old and not dying. However, "Li Kuan was adjudged old, so he did become old; he was seen dead, so he did die. It is thus quite easy to see that he did not have the divine process. How can there be any doubt?" Ge concludes by explaining:

I have taken the trouble to discuss Li Kuan at length because his pupils are maintaining his tradition, their teachings filling the land south of the Yangtze. Normally, roughly a thousand persons, not realizing that Li Kuan's methods are too shallow to be followed, do accept and observe them in the hope of attaining [Daoist transcendence]. Accordingly, I merely wish people to be conscious of this and to be aware how stagnant and beguiling it is. There is really no limit to the number of doctrines in the world similar to that of Li Kuan, though they are not his. I shall now mention them briefly in order to inform future generations who may not see through them.

Retreat to a lu chamber "is what we would expect of a Celestial Master adherent confronted with epidemic; the movement is well known to have counseled its members to retreat to 'chambers of quietness', confess their sins, and perform acts of penitence when taken ill, because illness was understood as a sign of prior transgression". Celestial Master practitioners also entered these chambers to send petitions to the celestial gods, which Li Kuan may have been doing on behalf of the plague-stricken people.

The subsequent Baopuzi context gives several stories about yinsi (淫祀, 'excessive cults') worshipping popular but illegitimate gods, borrowed word-for-word from the 195 Fengsu Tongyi. For instance, there was a cult that sacrificed to a plum tree. Zhang Zhu (張助) was a farmer from Runan Commandery (present-day Henan) who found a plum pit while working in his field, decided to plant it at home later, and placed it in the hollow of a mulberry tree, but forgot to take it with him. While Zhang was on a long trip, a fellow villager was surprised to see a plum tree sprouting out of a mulberry tree, and concluded it was a miracle. One day, a man with an eye disease was sitting in the shade under the tree and prayed to Lord Plum (李君, Li Jun), promising that if his disease was healed, he would sacrifice a suckling pig. Since his eyes happened to get better, the man killed a young pig and offered it in worship. Rumors spread that the tree could even restore sight to the blind, and many sick people came to be healed. The place became crowded with horses and carriages, and many people offered wines and meats to Lord Plum. This had been going on for several years when Zhang Zhu returned from his travels, saw the busy shrine and exclaimed: "This is only the plum tree I placed here long ago. There's no god!" Then he chopped it down, and all the activity ceased.

Ge Hong's Baopuzi descriptions do not mention the Way of the Celestial Masters, but the common ties of Li A (alias Li Babai) and Li Kuan to Shu, and the large communal meals and avoidance of blood offerings characterizing the Way of the Li clan suggest that what "Ge may have heard about was some form of Celestial Master practice (or at least a body of practice that had adopted some features of the Celestial Master religion and emanated from Shu)".

=== Shenxian Zhuan ===
Besides writing the Baopuzi, which conflates Li A and Li Babai, Ge Hong was also accredited as the original editor of the Shenxian Zhuan (神仙傳, 'Records of Divine Transcendents'), which has two separate hagiographies for them. Neither of them mentions the Way of the Li Family. The received edition of the text combines an original core written by Ge Hong with many later accretions up to the Song dynasty (960–1279). According to the research of the Shenxian Zhuan scholar and translator Robert Ford Campany, the Li A and Li Babai material is reliably attested by the year 650 (2002: 127).

The Li A hagiography says he was from Shu and regularly begged in the Chengdu market in order to distribute all the proceeds to the poor. It expands upon the brief Baopuzi description of him not using any divination techniques and leaving his questioners to divine the answers from Li's facial expressions, and adds several stories about his lay follower Gu Qiang (古强). The Baopuzi also mentions Gu Qiang as a Daoist herbology practitioner who appeared to be a healthy eighty-year-old and faults him for pretending to be thousands of years old. Gu became famous and wealthy from telling exaggerated stories about having personally met mythical sages including Emperor Yao and Emperor Shun. The Shenxian Zhuan says when Gu Qiang was eighteen, Li A appeared to be around fifty, and when Gu was eighty, Li had not changed at all. Li was summoned to Kunlun Mountain and never seen again.

Two features of this Li A story resemble the Way of the Celestial Masters traditions. The early Celestial Master community collected donations of rice from its practitioners and fed the needy; Li A begged in the Chengdu marketplace and gave all the proceeds to the poor. The Celestial Master religion prohibited using divination techniques and even possessing prognostication manuals; Li A does not use any method of divination, and refuses to speak of future matters, however his facial expressions reveal to questioners whether a matter will be auspicious or inauspicious.

The Li Babai hagiography says Li "Eight Hundred" was also a native of Shu, and usually lived secluded in the mountains but sometimes appeared in the markets. Most of Li Babai's account centers around testing his future disciple Tang Gongfang (唐公房) to determine if he was worthy of teaching. Li disguised himself and took a job as Tang's servant, proving himself a diligent worker. When Li pretended to be sick and near death, Tang hired a doctor and spent "several hundred thousand" pieces of cash trying to heal his servant, who had "disgusting sores [that] oozed blood and pus, and no one could bear to go near him". Tang told Li he did not regret hiring the expensive doctor and asked if he could do anything else. Li responded: "My ulcers will not be cured unless someone licks them. That should work." Tang sent in three maidservants to lick his sores but that did not help his condition. Li then said: "The maidservants' licking has not cured me. But I can be cured if you will do it yourself", so Tang licked his skin without any effect. Li then said that it would be most beneficial to have Tang's wife lick him, which Tang ordered her to do. Finally, Li declared that his ulcers would heal if he could bathe in thirty hu (斛) of fine liquor. Tang poured it in a large tub, Li bathed in the liquor, and the sores suddenly healed. "His body resembled congealed fat [凝脂 ningzhi; 'smooth, soft, and creamy skin'] and he bore no trace of illness". Li revealed to Tang that he was a transcendent, and had been testing him to see if he would make a suitable disciple. Li then instructed Tang, his wife, and the three maidservants to bathe in the remaining liquor, "they all reverted to youth, their countenances perfect and pleasing". Afterward, he transmitted a scripture on Daoist elixirs to Tang who entered the mountains to prepare the drug of immortality. "When it was complete, he ingested it and departed as a transcendent."

Campany notes that the Shenxian Zhuan hagiographies of Li A and Li Babai strongly resemble those of two other transcendents surnamed Li: Li Yiqi (李意期) and Li Changzai (李常在).

In summary:

1. Li A: native of Shu; distributes largesse to the poor; knows the future without resort to a divination procedure and communicates it by facial expression only, using no words; divides time between city market and mountains.
2. Li Babai: native of Shu; divides time between city market and mountains.
3. Li Yiqi: native of Shu; distributes largesse (obtained by begging, probably in city market) to the poor; knows the future without resort to a divination procedure and communicates it by facial expression only, using no words; enters mountains.
4. Li Changzai: native of Shu; divides time between city and mountains; knows the future without apparent resort to a divination procedure.

As discussed above, aspects of these hagiographies may reflect Celestial Masters practices.

=== Later references ===
The 648 Jin Shu history of the Eastern Jin dynasty (318–419) records a Daoist practitioner named Li Tuo (李脫) or Li Babai:

His sorcery deceived the masses. He pretended to be eight hundred years old and consequently was nicknamed Li Babai (李八百). In the region between Zhongzhou (中州) and Jianye (建鄴), he healed the sick with ghostly methods (鬼道, guidao) and invested people with official appointments. In those days many people put their trust in him and served him. His younger brother (or disciple; 弟子, dizi) Li Hong (李弘), who assembled followers on Mount Xin (灊山), proclaimed: "According to a prophecy I shall be King (應讖當王, Yingchan dang wang).

After two feuding officials accused Li Tuo and Li Hong of having plotted rebellion, they were tried and executed in 324. "The magician (術人, shuren) Li Tuo seduced the crowd with magic writings (妖書, yaoshu) of his own fabrication. He was beheaded on the market place of Jiankang (建康)."

There are similarities between the Way of the Li Family and activities of Li Tuo and Li Hong a few decades later. Both movements attracted followers through healing, particularly with talismans, and claiming supernatural longevity. Namely, Li A as "Sir Eight Hundred" and then Li Kuan and Li Tuo as "Li Eight Hundred". A major difference is that while the Way of the Li Family was not associated with any politico-religious aspirations, Li Hong referred to a prophecy that he would become king. Nevertheless, there is no historical proof that Li Tuo belonged to the Way of the Li Family, and this tradition is too scarcely documented in primary sources to allow for anything more than conjectures.

The Northern Wei court's Celestial Master Kou Qianzhi wrote the 415 Laojun yinsong jiejing (老君音誦誡經), that denounced diviners who called themselves Li and abused the people. Several prophets who called themselves Li or Li Hong (李弘, Laozi's appellation as the messiah) arose in south China, especially in the Wu and Shu regions. Some of them led popular, millenarian-type rebellions and were executed for deceiving the masses and causing social disorder. Most of them belonged to the Way of the Li Family, a "long-lasting sect" that spread throughout southern China during the Six Dynasties (220–589), and was condemned as heterodox by the Daoists themselves.

== See also ==
- House of Li
- Li (surname 李)
