= Zhongxiao =

Zhongxiao may refer to:

中小

- Zhongxiao town (中小镇), a town in the prefecture-level city of Haicheng, Liaoning Province, China

中校

- Zhongxiao, Chinese for lieutenant colonel (中校)

忠孝 ('Loyalty and filial piety' in Chinese)

- Zhongxiao Bridge, a bridge on Zhongxiao Road West, Taipei
- Zhongxiao Road, a major arterial boulevard in Taipei, Taiwan
- Zhongxiao township (忠孝乡), a township in Santai County, the prefecture-level city of Mianyang, Sichuan Province
  - Zhongxiao village
    - Zhongxiao village (忠孝里), a village in East District, Tainan
    - Zhongxiao village (忠孝里), a village in Zhonghe District, New Taipei
    - Zhongxiao village (忠孝里), a village in Zhongli District, Taoyuan
    - Zhongxiao village (忠孝村), a village in Zhuangwei Township, Yilan
- Kee Tai Zhongxiao, a skyscraper in Zhongzheng District, Taipei
- King Zhongxiao (忠孝王)

== See also ==
- Zhongxiao Dunhua metro station, a station of the Taipei Metro
- Zhongxiao Fuxing metro station, a station of the Taipei Metro
- Zhongxiao Xinsheng metro station, a station of the Taipei Metro
- Fu Hao, original name Fu Zhongxiao (符忠孝), a Chinese diplomat and vice-minister of the Ministry
- Jingming Dao (Jingming Zhongxiao Daoism), a Daoist school
- Koxinga, Count of Zhongxiao
