= Daoist schools =

Various Taoist denominations

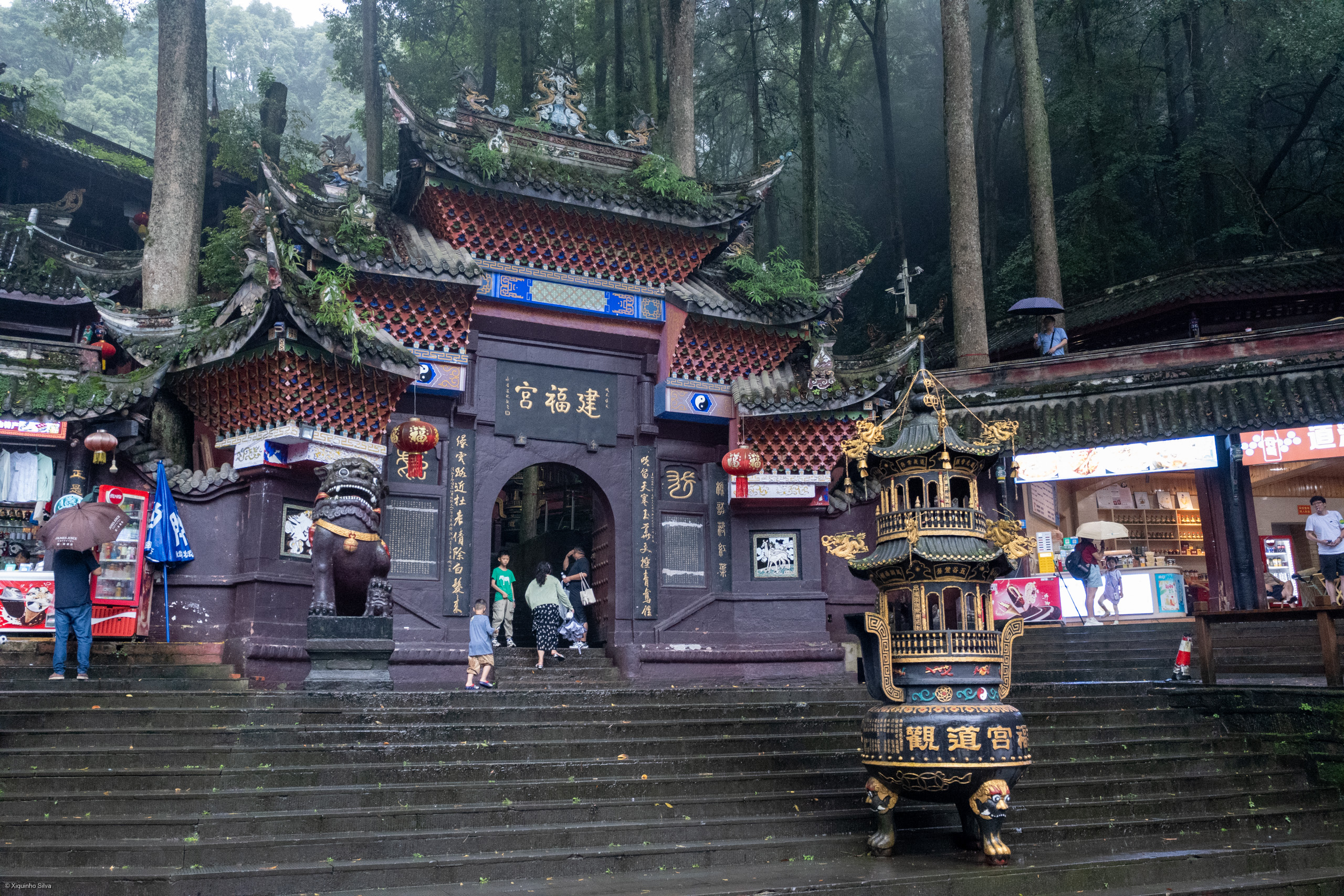
Jianfu Palace in Mount Qingcheng, one of the most renowned Taoist school in China

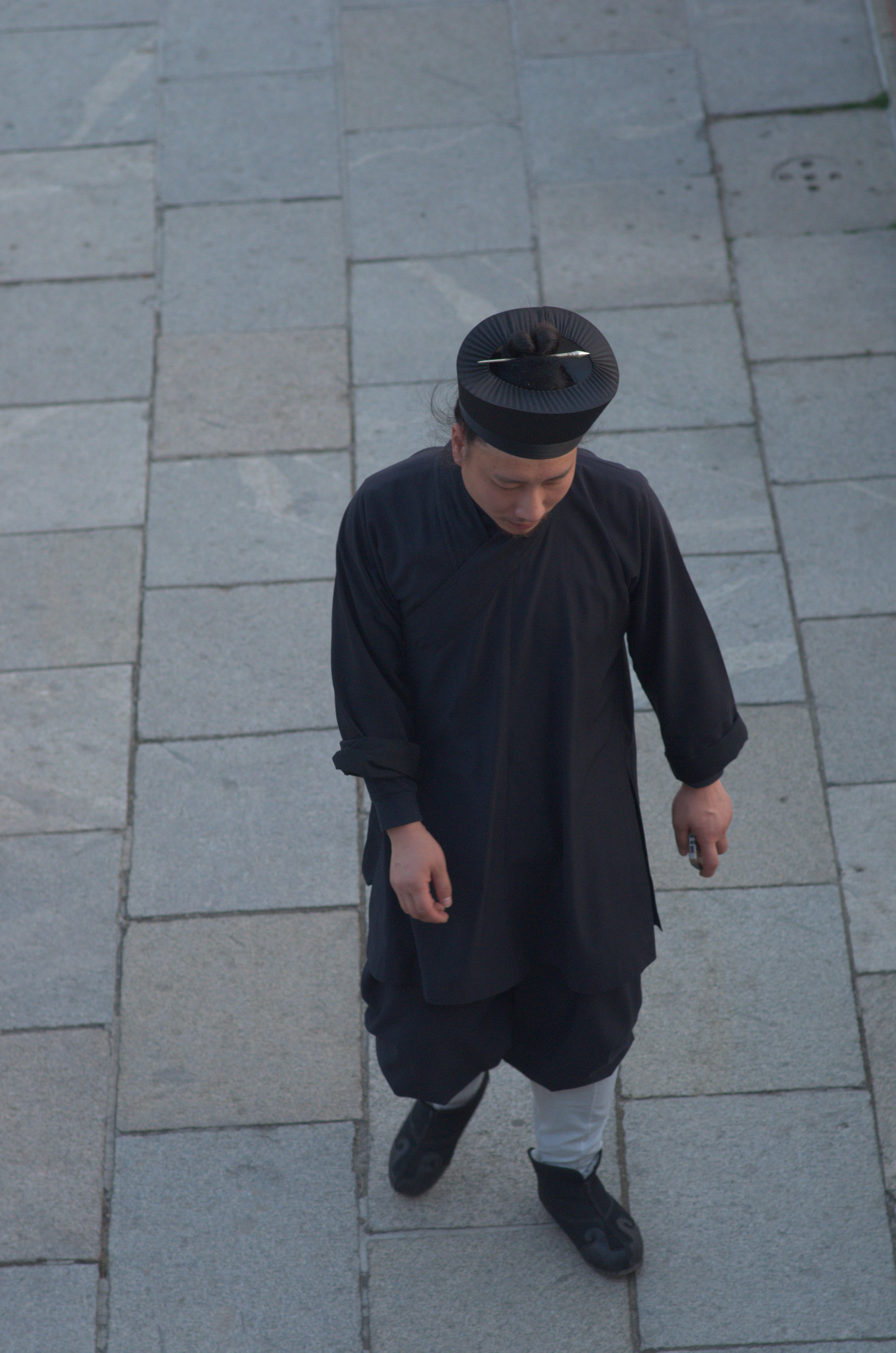
A monk of the Quanzhen school of Mount Tai, in Shandong

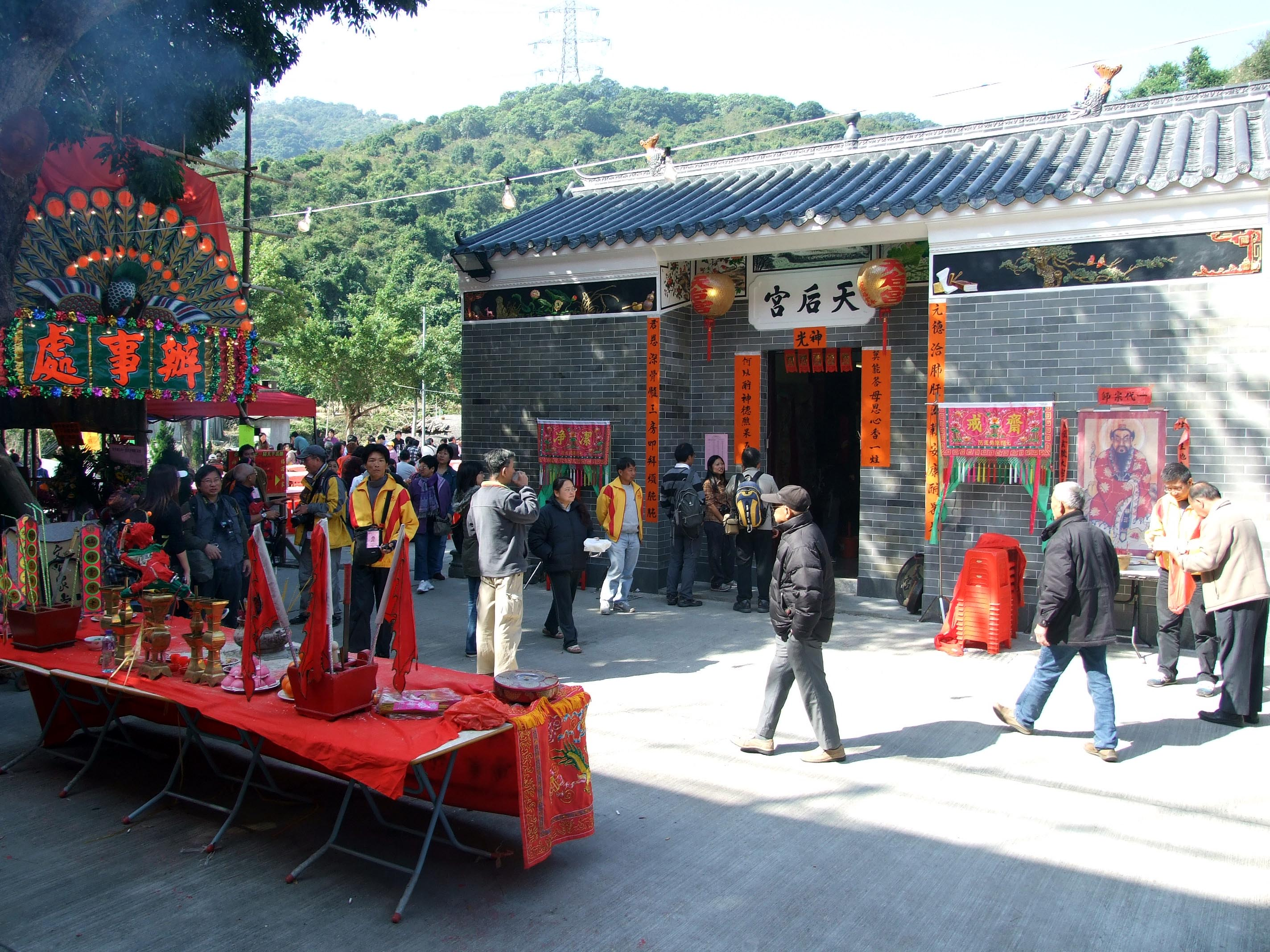
Taiping dajiao ritual based on the Taipingjing performed at a Tianhou temple in Hong Kong

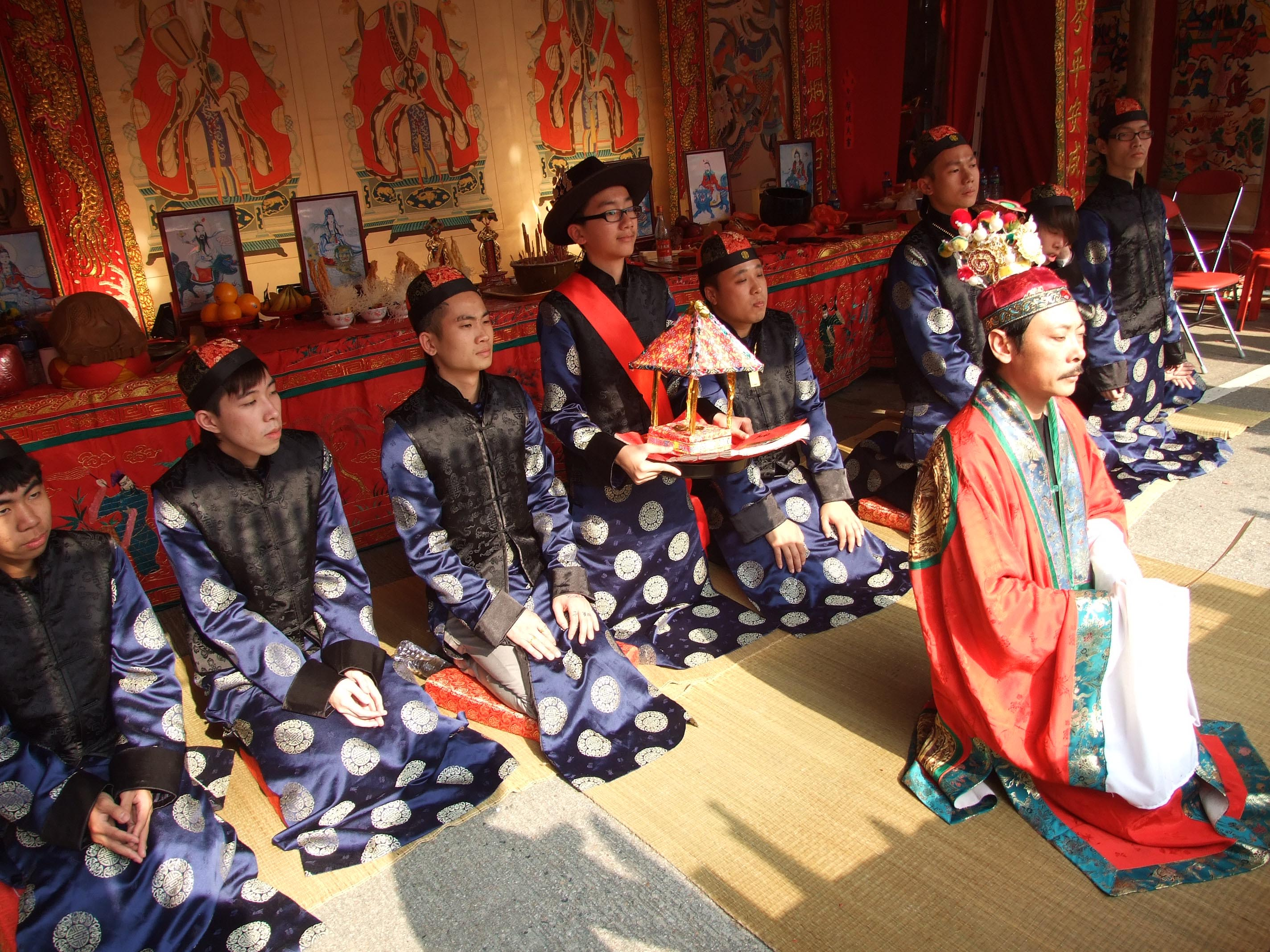
Taoist ritual in Fanling Wai

Daoist schools are the major lineages, movements, and institutional traditions within Daoism (Taoism), an East Asian religious tradition that developed in China and later spread across East Asia. Rather than rigid sectarian divisions, Daoist schools usually build their identity around a set of scriptures, ritual practices, or sacred mountains or temples.

The earliest Daoist schools emerged during the late Eastern Han dynasty (25–220 CE). They blossomed especially in the region of Shu, modern-day Sichuan. From the 12th and 13th centuries onwards several smaller branches merged into larger ones, but in turn, side-schools developed around the large traditions.

In modern China, Daoism is generally understood as structured around two enduring traditions:

Zhengyi (正一, “Orthodox Unity”) Dao is the principle non-monastic and public ritual variant of Daoism, traced to the Celestial Masters tradition that began with Zhang Daoling in 142 CE. Zhengyi priests live in society (often marrying and maintaining households) and function primarily as ritual specialists serving local communities through public services. These services include jiao offerings/renewal rites, zhai fasts and purification observances, funerary and salvation rites, exorcistic and healing rituals, and the use of talismans and registers that confer ritual authority.

Quanzhen (全真, “Complete Perfection”) Dao is the principle monastic form and private cultivation variant of Daoism, founded in the 12th century by Wang Chongyang. It emphasizes celibate communal life, formal ordination and precepts, and inner cultivation practices such as internal alchemy (neidan) and meditation. It is framed explicitly through a "Three Teachings" synthesis that combines Daoist cosmology, Buddhist meditation and monastic models, and Confucian ethical behavior.

== Chronology of major schools and lineages ==
In Daoist history, the term “school” (pai 派, zong 宗, or “teaching” jiao 教) does not function like a fixed denomination in the way it often does in Western religious contexts. Many Daoist “schools” are better understood as lineages of transmission, collections of texts and ritual practices, or site-based traditions organized around sacred mountains or temples.

=== Eastern Han period to Western Jin period (c. 140-316) ===
This phase marks Daoism’s transition from a loose collection of classical texts (often classified as Daoist philosophy) and local folk practices into organized religious movements with doctrine, ritual, clerical roles, and community structure.

Tianshi Dao (天师道 Tiānshī dào, "Way of the Celestial Masters") / Wudoumi Dao (五斗米道 Wǔdǒumǐ dào, "Way of the Five Pecks of Rice")

According to Daoist tradition, in 142 CE Zhang Daoling received a revelation from Laojun (the deified form of Laozi), authorizing him to found a new religious community. This community, known as Tianshi Dao (“Way of the Celestial Masters”), is widely regarded as the earliest major organized Daoist movement.

Zhang Daoling's grandson, Zhang Lu, is traditionally credited with institutionalizing and administering a network of 24 Daoist "parishes" in the area of Sichuan/Hanzhong. Steeped in moral discipline, what made Zhang Lu's movement attractive was its faith-healing method. It taught that illness and misfortune was caused by a cosmic imbalance (described as harm from gui, or spirits, that could enter the body when one’s qi was weakened by immoral conduct) and that purification rites, especially confession and repentance, could restore health. It combined communal life with a structured priesthood—clerical ranks, ritual offices, and the transmission of registers conferring divine authority—forming an institutional model that later became the foundation for the later Zhengyi (Orthodox Unity) tradition.

Many sources interchangeably refer to this movement as Wudoumi dao (五斗米道 Wǔdǒumǐ dào, "Way of the Five Pecks of Rice"), a reference to its members' annual household contribution of five pecks of rice. However, some sources suggest this was used largely as an external (and sometimes pejorative) name rather than a self-designation.

Taiping Dao (太平道 Tàipíng dào, "Way of the Great Peace")

Taiping Dao was a millenarian movement active in the late Eastern Han. It is associated with the Taiping jing (Scripture of Great Peace) and emphasized the belief that the world was entering a new cosmic era of “Great Peace.” The movement is historically linked to the Yellow Turban Rebellion of 184 CE. Although it was quickly suppressed, Taiping Dao had a lasting influence on Daoist themes of cosmic renewal, moral reform, and the possibility of a radically different future.

Following the collapse of the Han, Celestial Masters communities were disrupted by warfare and state intervention, most notably the defeat of Zhang Lu by Cao Cao in 215 CE resulting in the forced dispersal of Daoist adherents. As a result, Daoism strategically focused less on transforming the world through politics and more on surviving as an institution. There was an increased focus on preserving its identity through ritual continuity, moral discipline, and hereditary transmission within the Zhang family.

This time period also saw the emergence of smaller regional Daoist movements such as Lijia Dao (李家道, “Way of the Li Family/Lineage”) and Bojia Dao (帛家道, “Way of the Bo Lineage”).

=== Eastern Jin and Southern Dynasties Period (317–589) ===
This period saw Daoism respond to the growing influence of Buddhism through new internal cultivation practices, rituals, and expanded soteriological frameworks. Two new important traditions, Shangqing and Lingbao, emerged first as a series of divinely revealed texts before becoming identifiable institutions.

Shangqing Dao (上清派 Shàngqīng pài, "School of the Highest Clarity")

The Shangquin Dao tradition emerged between 364 and 370, when the spirit medium Yang Xi recorded texts that were presented as communications from "Perfected" beings (including Wei Huacun). Unlike Daoist texts that focus on communal rites and liturgies, Shangqing materials are highly internal. In Shangqing texts, the body is treated like a sacred space that can be "inhabited" by divine presences. Instead of “summoning” gods through official paperwork-like rituals, Shangqing practitionersconnect with divine beings through prayer, chanting, and visualization.

Over time, Shangqing gradually took on institutional form, becoming a prominent form of Daoism among the aristocratic and literate elites. In the 5th–6th centuries, Tao Hongjing collected, edited, and systematized the Shangqing materials and linked them to specific sites and transmission lines (later associated strongly with the Maoshan tradition (茅山宗 Máoshān zōng)).

Lingbao Dao (靈寳派 Língbǎo pài, "School of the Numinous Treasure")

In the late 4th and early 5th centuries, Lingbao texts likewise emerged, presented as a series of texts divine revealed to Ge Chaofu, grandnephew of the famous alchemist Ge Hong. The term bao referred to objects that embodied Heaven’s mandate (ritual bronzes, jades, swords) into which divine power (ling) inhabited.

Lingbao scriptures integrated Daoist cosmology with Buddhist themes such as karma, rebirth, hells, and large-scale cosmic cycles. Ritually, Lingbao introduced several new communal practices, including a framework for funerary rites that offered salvation for both the living and the dead.

With the creation of the Shangqing and Lingbao texts, Daoism began to clearly define its two main poles: A set of personal and internal transformation practices (as seen in Shangqing) and a set of communal ritual and liturgical practices (as seen in Lingbao).

Around the 5th century, Lu Xiujing and other Daoists in southeastern China made the first attempt to systematically organize Daoist texts into a structured "canon", known as the Three Caverns (Sandong) (likely drawing inspiration from the Tripiṭaka structure of the Buddhist canon). In this system, the Daoist scriptural traditions were placed into three ranked categories: Shangqing, Lingbao, and Sanhaung (associated with older talismanic materials).

=== Sui–Tang–Early Song Period (589–1115) ===
With the reunification of China under the Sui dynasty, Daoism increasingly operated as a state-recognized religion with court patronage, regulated clerical presence, and expanding textual and ritual standardization. During the Tang dynasty (618–907), the Li family of the Tang ruling house justified their reign by claiming direct, paternal descent from Laozi (often stylized Li Er). During this period, every single emperor (with the notable exception of the Buddhist-aligned Empress Wu) patronaged Daoism, as Daoist priests and institutions were given formal recognition and Daoist scripture became standardized.

In this period, Daoist institutions competed with Buddhism and Confucianism for court support and public prestige, mostly notable through a series of court-sponsored debates between Daoists, Buddhists and Confucianists. This contributed to the emergence of “Three Teachings” (sanjiao) discourse, which examined how the three traditions could be harmonized in Chinese society. However, this did not mean the traditions coexisted entirely peacefully, as several Buddhist persecutions were driven by Daoist emperors in 446, 567, 845, and 955.

During this time, several important Daoist centers and currents flourished: After the Northern Wei theocracy collapsed, Northern Celestial Masters Daoists fled to Louguan, becoming an important religious center. Tang intellectual life saw the development of Chongxuan (“Twofold Mystery”), a philosophical current influenced by Buddhist Madhyamaka thought, while Shangqing masters such as Sima Chengzhen systematized meditation manuals.

=== Jurchen Jin and Southern Song Period (1115–1279) ===
This period marked a significant transformation in Daoism in two complementary ways: The development of a monastic and inner-cultivation form of Daoism, and the continued refinement of highly specialized ritual techniques.

Quanzhen Dao (全真道, "Way of Complete Perfection")

Quanzhen Dao was founded in Jurchen-led northern China in 1167 by Wang Chongyang. Quanzhen Dao would develop a monastic form of Daoist inspired heavily by the structure of Buddhist monasteries. While other Daoist priests started families and performed public rituals, Quanzhen Daoists lived a celibate, monastic life that emphasized ethical self-cultivation and internal alchemy (neidan) practices.

Quanzhen Dao is explicitly grounded in Three Teachings philosophy, integrating Daoism with mediation techniques and monastic organization of Buddhism alongside the ethical discipline and social responsibility of Confucianism. Following Wang Chongyang's death in 1170, his seven disciples expanded Quanzhen Daoism through seven branches:

- Ma Yu (馬鈺): Yuxian lineage (Meeting the Immortals, 遇仙派)
- Tan Chuduan (譚處端): Nanwu lineage (Southern Void, 南無派)
- Liu Chuxuan (劉處玄): Suishan lineage (Mount Sui, 隨山派)
- Qiu Chuji (丘處機): Longmen lineage (Dragon Gate Taoism, 龍門派)
- Wang Chuyi (王處一): Yushan lineage (Mount Yu, 崳山派)
- Hao Datong (郝大通): Huashan lineage (Mount Hua, 華山派)
- Sun Bu'er (孫不二): Qingjing lineage (Purity and Tranquility School, 清靜派)

Zhengyi Dao (正一道 Zhèng Yī Dào, "Way of Orthodox Unity")

Throughout the Song, the descendants of Zhang Daoling continued to reside on Dragon Tiger Mountain (Longhushan), serving as the hereditary lineage of the Zhang family. In 1239, Emperor Lizong (r. 1224–1264) ordered the 35th Celestial Master Zhang Keda to unify the talismans and registers of the "Three Mountains": Longhushan (Celestial Masters), Maoshan (Shangqing), and Gezaoshan (Lingbao). Thus, the Celestial Masters tradition that originated in 185 CE continued by formally transforming into what is now known as Zhengyi Dao. This consolidation began to establish "Zhengyi Dao" as the primary umbrella term for public, service-oriented Daoism.

The hereditary Zhang family now became recognized custodians of Daoist ritual authority. It is this focus on ritual governance that becomes a distinguishing feature of Zhengyi Dao. Priests remain non-monastic (able to marry and live in society) and perform communal rites using registers and talismans, including jiao (offering/renewal rites), zhai (fasting observances), funerary liturgies, and exorcistic services aimed at maintaining cosmic and social order.

During the Song, ritual Daoism becomes technically dense and specialized. This period saw the gradual emergence of highly technical and complex "Thunder Rites" (雷法 leifa): rituals designed to invoke cosmic thunder energy to exorcise demons, control the weather, heal illnesses, and purify spaces. Commonly noted Southern Song ritual currents include:

- Tianxin (天心, “Heavenly Heart/Correct Method”)
- Shenxiao (神霄, “Divine Empyrean”)
- Qingwei (清微, “Pristine Simplicity”)
- Donghua (東華, “Eastern Florescence”)
- Jingming (淨明, “Pure Brightness”)

Other religious movements briefly appeared during this time as well, such as Zhenda Dao (真大道 Zhēndà dào, "True Wide Way") and Taiyi Dao (太一道 Tàiyī dào, "Way of the Great Oneness"), but they did not achieve the same long-term institutional prominence as Quanzhen.

=== Yuan Dynasty and Ming Dynasty (1279 - 1644) ===
Under the Mongol rule of the Yuan dynasty, Quanzhen Dao faced a measure of support due to the deep respect Genghis Khan held for Qiu Chuji, one of Wang Chongyang's seven disciples. However, due to the institutional power of Tibetan Buddhism at the time, Daoism became increasingly regulated, and Daoist texts that positioned Daoism as superior to Buddhism were suppressed.

With the founding of the Ming dynasty, China was once again under Han Chinese control, and Neo-Confucianism became the ruling ideology of the state. Daoism was once again officially recognized, but placed under strict bureaucratic control. The Zhengyi lineage was formally designated as the head of Daoist ritual authority, particularly for non-monastic and communal practices.

Although not at the level of the Tang or Song, some Ming emperors still patronized Daoism. For example, when the third Ming emperor, The Yongle Emperor (r. 1402 - 1424) rose to power in a violent civil war, he claimed his military victory was due to the Daoist deity Xuanwu and built a massive Daoist temple complex on Mount Wudong. The twelfth Ming emperor, the Jiajing Emperor, (r. 1521–1567), was deeply obsessed with Daoist immortality and longevity practices after surviving an assassination attempt, and spent much of the later half of his reign committed to these pursuits. One of the most significant developments of this phase was the large-scale compilation and printing of the Daoist Canon (Daozang) in 1445.

By the end of the 15th century, Daoism would settle into a stable dual structure that persists to the modern day:

- Zhengyi Dao as the dominant ritual and service-oriented tradition, overseeing talismans, registers, exorcism, funerary rites, and community ceremonies.
- Quanzhen Dao as the dominant monastic and cultivation-based tradition, focused on inner alchemy, meditation, and ethical discipline.

=== Qing Dynasty (1644–1912) ===
During the Manchu-ruled Qing Dynasty, rulers had little interest in Daoism, preferring to once again patronize Tibetan Buddhism while favoring Neo-Confucianism for state matters. Daoism remained settled into its two institutional forms, Zhengyi and Quanzhen. Although it lost support at the level of the imperial court, Daoism still thrived among local villages and lay people, often in a syncretic religious framework that combined the Three Teachings with folk religion.

A notable expression of this development is the school of Wu Liu Pai School (伍柳派 Wŭliŭpài, "School of Wu-Liu"), based on the teachings of Wu Shouyang (1574–1644) and later systematized by Liu Huayang (1735–1799). This school textual and philosophical tradition centered on creating a systematization of internal alchemy theory. During this time, alchemical imagery (such as the refinement of qi, jing, and shen) began to be viewed in symbolic, not literal terms. In other words, internal alchemy began to be viewed as a collection of psychological processes, not literal physiological transformations of immortality. In addition, the school integrated ideas of Neo-Confucian self-cultivation, highlighting the importance of moral sincerity and daily self-regulation.

== Other schools ==
Other additional branches and lineages that are named include:

- Louguan Dao (樓觀派 Lóuguān pài or 樓觀道 Lóuguān dào, "School [or Way] of the Contemplation Place"
- Longhu Church or Lineage (龍虎宗 Lónghǔ zōng)
- Gezao Church or Lineage (閣皂宗 Gézào zōng)
- Jindan Taoism (金丹派 Jīndān pài) or Southern Church (南宗 Nán zōng)
- Laoshan or Lao Huashan Taoism (老華山派 Lǎo huàshān pài)
- Jiu Gongshan Taoism (九宮山派 Jiǔ gōngshān pài)
- Xuan Taoism (玄教 Xuán jiào)
- Sanfeng Taoism (三豐派 Sānfēng pài)
- Wudang Taoism (武當道 Wǔdāng dào) or Wudang Benshan Taoism (武當本山派 Wǔdāng běnshān pài)
- Jinshan Taoism (金山派 Jīnshān pài) or Laoshan Taoism (嶗山派 Láoshān pài)
- ChunYang Taoism (纯阳派 chunyang pài)

Newest schools:

- Dong Taoism or Eastern Taoism (東派 Dōng pài), Neidan Dong Taoism (内丹東派 Nèidān dōng pài)
- Hsien-t'ien Tao
- Kunlun Taoism
- Western Taoism
- Emei Taoism (峨眉白猿派 Emei Bai Yuan Pai)
- Xi Taoism or Western Taoism (西派 Xi pài), Neidan Xi Taoism (内丹西派 Nèidān xi pài)
- Zangmigong

== See also ==
- Faism
- List of religions
- Neidan and Waidan
- Qigong
- Taoism in Hong Kong
- Taoism in Malaysia
- Taoism in Singapore
- Taoism in Korea
- Taoism in Vietnam
- Chinese folk religion
- Chinese folk religion in Southeast Asia
- Yao folk religion

== Sources ==
- Poul Andersen, Florian C. Reiter. Scriptures, Schools and Forms of Practice in Daoism: A Berlin Symposium. Harrassowitz Verlag, 2005. ISBN 344705171X
- Qing Xitai (1994) 卿希泰. Zhongguo daojiao 中國道教, vol. 1, pp. 77–83. Shanghai: Zhishi chubanshe. Online.
- Kohn, Livia (2008). Introducing Daoism. New York: Routledge. ISBN 9780415439985.
- Wong, Eva (2011). Taoism: An Essential Guide. Shambhala. ISBN 978-1-59030-882-0.
