= Chu (Taoism) =

Taoist name for various religious practices

- Ancient Chinese seal script for chu 廚 "kitchen"

Chinese name
- Traditional Chinese: 廚
- Simplified Chinese: 厨
- Literal meaning: kitchen
Transcriptions
Standard Mandarin
- Hanyu Pinyin: chú
- Wade–Giles: ch'u
Middle Chinese
- Middle Chinese: drju
Old Chinese
- Baxter–Sagart (2014): [d]ro

Korean name
- Hangul: 주
- Hanja: 廚
Transcriptions
- Revised Romanization: ju
- McCune–Reischauer: chu

Japanese name
- Kanji: 厨
- Hiragana: ちゅう
Transcriptions
- Revised Hepburn: chū

Chu (廚, lit. 'kitchen') is a Daoist name used for various religious practices including communal chu (Kitchen) banquet rituals in Way of the Celestial Masters liturgy, the legendary xingchu (行廚, Mobile Kitchen) associated with Daoist xian ("transcendents; 'immortals'"), and wuchu (五廚, Five Kitchens) representing the wuzang (五臟, Five Viscera) in neidan meditation techniques.

== Terminology ==
Chú ("kitchen; to cook; a cook") can be written with three Chinese characters 廚, 㕑, and 厨. The common traditional Chinese character 廚 combines the "house radical" 广 with a phonetic indicator shù 尌 (joining zhù 壴 "drum" and cùn 寸 "hand"); and the variant traditional character 㕑 has "cliff radical" 厂 instead of 广. The simplified Chinese character 厨 omits the 士 element in 壴, leading to a "graphic folk etymology" of "A 厂 'room' for cooking 豆 'beans' with your 寸 'hands'". The Chinese logograph 廚 was anciently used as a loan character for chú 櫥 (with the "wood radical" 木, "cabinet") or chú 幮 ("cloth radical" 巾, "a screen used for a temporary kitchen").

The Modern Standard Chinese lexicon uses chu in many compound words, for instance, chúfáng (廚房 with 房 "room", "kitchen"), chúshī (廚師 with 師 "master", "cook; chef"), chúdāo (廚刀 with 刀 "knife", "kitchen knife"), and páochú (庖廚 with 庖 "kitchen", meaning "kitchen").

In Daoist specialized vocabulary, chu names a Kitchen-feast communal meal, and sometimes has a technical meaning of "magic", "used to designate the magical recipes through which one becomes invisible". The extensive semantic field of chu can be summarized in some key Daoist expressions: ritual banquets, communion with divinities, granaries (zang 藏, a word that also denotes the viscera), visualization of the Five Viscera (wuzang 五臟, written with the "flesh radical" ⺼), and abstention from cereals (bigu), and other food proscriptions. According to Daoist classics, when bigu "grain avoidance" techniques were successful, xingchu (行廚, Mobile Kitchens or tianchu (天廚, Celestial Kitchens) were brought in gold and jade vessels by the yunü (玉女, Jade Women) and jintong (金僮, Golden Boys), associated with the legendary Jade Emperor.

Chinese Buddhist terminology applies chu (廚, cf. 櫥 "cabinet") "kitchen; kitchen cupboard" to denote the "cabinet for an image or relic of the Buddhas", translating Sanskrit bhakta-śālā "food-hall" or mahânasa "kitchen".

In Chinese astronomy, Tiānchú (天廚, Celestial Kitchen) is the name of an asterism in the constellation Draco, located next to Tiānbàng (天棓, Celestial Flail), and Nèichú (內廚, Inner Kitchen).

== Translations ==
There is no standard English translation for either Daoist chu (廚, Kitchen) or xingchu (行廚, Mobile Kitchen). The former is rendered as:

- "kitchen festival", "kitchen feast"
- "Kitchens"
- "kitchen banquets"
- "cuisines"
- "Kitchens"
- "cuisines"

These Anglophone scholars render Chinese chu as either English kitchen ("a room for preparing food"), optionally clarified with K-, -festival or -feast, or cuisine ("a characteristic style of cooking, often associated with a place of origin"). The latter follows Francophone sinologists, for instance Henri Maspero and Christine Mollier, who accurately translated Chinese chu as French cuisine ("kitchen; cooking") and xingchu as cuisine de voyage ("travel kitchen"). Although English kitchen and French cuisine are doublets deriving from Latin cocīna ("cooking; kitchen"), they are false friends with significant semantic differences between English kitchen and cuisine. Chinese usually translates English kitchen as chúfáng (廚房, "kitchen") and cuisine as pēngrèn (烹飪, "art of cooking").

The term xingchu (行廚) has been translated as

- "Traveling Canteen"
- "mobile kitchen"
- "perform the Kitchen"
- "travelling kitchen-feast"
- "traveling canteen'
- "traveling kitchen"
- "movable cuisines"
- "Mobile Kitchens"

Joseph Needham calls Ware's "Traveling Canteen" a "bizarre translation". While Maspero uniquely interprets the xing (行) in xingchu as a verb ("to perform"), the other scholars read it as a modifier ("to go; to move") translated as traveling, mobile, or movable (cf. movable feast). The chu noun in xingchu is translated as English kitchen, cuisine, or canteen. However, the latter ambiguous word has several meanings besides canteen ("a cafeteria or snack bar provided by an organization"), canteen ("a small water bottle"), and British English canteen ("a case or box containing a cutlery set"). To further complicate translating xingchu, travelling canteen was the 18th-century equivalent of a picnic basket. In modern terms, the xingchu is comparable with a mobile kitchen, military field kitchen, food truck, or food cart.

== Chu Kitchen feast ==
The chu (廚, Kitchen), also known as fushi (福食, "good luck meal"), was a religious banquet that usually involved preliminary fasting and purification before consuming a meal of vegetarian food and Chinese wine. The banquet was hosted by families on the occasion of births and deaths, prepared for a ritually-fixed number of parishioners, and accompanied by specific ritual gifts to the Daoist priest. Although the Kitchen Feast became a regular element of organized Daoist religious traditions, scholars do not know the date when it was introduced into the liturgy. One early textual record is the c. 499 Zhen'gao saying that Xu Mi (許谧, 303–376) offered a Kitchen meal to five persons .

These communal chu Kitchen banquets have a pre-Daoist antecedent in popular Chinese folk religion: the term chu was anciently used for the ceremonial meals organized by communities to honor the she (社, God of the Soil). Although orthodox Daoists criticized, and sometimes banned, these chuhui (廚會, "cuisine congregations") for making immoral animal sacrifices, they nevertheless perpetuated the custom by adapting and codifying it. Chu kitchen-feasts have many features in common with another Daoist ritual meal, the zhāi (齋, "fast; purification; retreat"), and the two are frequently treated as having the same functions. The 7th-century Daoist Zhaijielu (齋戒錄, Records of Fasting) suggested that zhai were anciently called shehui (社會, "festival gatherings of the soil god"—now the modern Chinese word for "society"), which was later changed into zhaihui (齋會).

The Way of the Celestial Masters religion, founded by Zhang Daoling in 142 CE, celebrated chu kitchen festivals at New Year and the annual sanhui (三會, Three Assemblies), which were major Daoist festivals held in the first, seventh, and tenth lunar months, when believers assembled at their local parish to report any births, deaths, or marriages, so that the population registers could be updated. Parishioners who had reason to celebrate on these occasions would host a chu feast for other members of the community in proportion to the significance of their auspicious event and their means. Accounts of these banquets "emphasize both the sharing of food and the affirmation of the unique, religious merit-based social order of the Daoist community".

The chu sacrament had three levels of banquets and ritual gifts, depending upon what the family was celebrating. For the birth of a boy, the shangchu (上廚, Superior Ceremony of the Kitchen) was a banquet offered to the priest and ten members of the parish, with gifts to the priest of a hundred sheets of paper, a pair of ink brushes, an inkstick, and an ink scraper. For the birth of a girl, it was the less expensive zhongchu (中廚, Middle Ceremony of the Kitchen) with a banquet for five parishioners, and the gifts, which the parents had to provide within one month following the birth, were a mat, a wastebasket, and a broom. For the death of a family member, the xiachu (下廚, Inferior Ceremony of the Kitchen), also called jiechu (解廚, Kitchen of Deliverance), is not described in Daoist texts, and we only know that the rival Buddhist polemicists claimed it was a "great orgy".

The anti-Daoist Erjiaolun (二教論, Essay on Two Religions) by the Buddhist monk Dao'an (312–385) said chu kitchen-feasts were intended to bring about jiěchú (解除, "liberation and elimination") from pollution and sins, which were connected with the soil god and tombs. The parallel passage in the 6th-century Bianhuolun (辯惑論, Essay on Debating Doubts) uses the homophonous graphic variant of jiěchú (解廚, "liberation kitchen"), thus connecting both chú "kitchen" and chú "liberation" to non-Daoist gods of the soil.

Daoist sources record that the people invited to a chu Kitchen feast would first observe a period of purification that included fasting and abstention from sex. Kitchen rituals lasted for one, three, or seven days. Participants consumed exclusively vegetarian food and moderate amounts of wine, which was considered as a mandatory element of the banquet. For the Superior Kitchens five sheng of wine (about a liter) per person was planned, for the Middle Kitchens, four sheng, and for the Inferior Kitchen three. The participants "must have departed a bit happy, but not drunk." The leftovers were given to other parishioners who could thereby share in the ritual.

Besides annual festivals on fixed dates like the Three Assemblies, chu Kitchen ceremonies were also performed in special circumstances, particularly when there was disease, sin, or death pollution. They were believed to have exorcistic and salvific powers and to confer good luck or merit upon the adepts. Kitchen ceremonies often involved Daoist ritual jiao (醮, "offerings") of cakes and pieces of fabric in order to obtain particular favors, such as petitions for recovery from illnesses, prayers for rain in time of drought, and thanksgivings for favors received. An altar was laid out in the open air, and the priest recited prayers.

Ge Hong's c. 318 Baopuzi (see below) mentions profligately expensive chu Kitchen Feasts in contrasting heterodox yaodao (妖道, "demonic cults"), which involved sacrificing animals to gods who enjoyed their blood, with the Lijia dao (李家道, Way of the Li Family). The context praises the contemporary charlatan healer Li Kuan (李寬) for not following the ancient tradition of animal sacrifice, while blaming him for extravagance.

The more than a hundred ways for dealing with demons [諸妖道百餘種] all call for slaying living creatures so that their blood may be drunk. Only the doctrine of the Lis [李家道] is slightly different. Yet, though it does no butchering, whenever its "good-luck food" is served [每供福食], it includes varieties of mixtures without limit. In planning the meal, one strives for sumptuousness, and the rarest things must be purchased. Several dozen may work in the kitchen [或數十人廚], and costs for food can run high indeed. In turn, these are not completely disinterested affairs, and they might well be classed with things to be forbidden.

== Xingchu Mobile Kitchen traditions ==
In Daoist hagiographies and stories, the esoteric ability to summon a xingchu (行廚, Mobile Kitchen) was a standard trope for the powers of a xian transcendent. The xingchu, which Campany called a "curious business", was a sumptuous banquet of rare delicacies, exotic foods, and wines that could be instantly served up by spirits anywhere on command.

The tradition of xingchu "meditational cuisines" or "contemplative cuisines" seems to have developed in a parallel and complementary manner to the chu "communal cuisine liturgy". Xian transcendents were portrayed as eschewing what counted in China as ordinary foods, especially grains (see bigu), and instead eating superior, longevity-inducing substitutes such as sesame seeds and lingzhi mushrooms, typically found in distant and legendary places removed from the heartland of agriculture-based Chinese civilization. Transcendents were frequently depicted as winged beings able to fly long distances rapidly and summoning a xingchu banquet at will eliminated the need to travel across the world and heavens in order to obtain rare foodstuffs of immortality.

The Jin Dynasty Daoist scholar Ge Hong compiled the two primary sources of information about xingchu Mobile Kitchens, the Baopuzi and Shenxian zhuan. Ge portrayed adepts seeking xian-hood as avoiding ordinary food such as grains, instead eating "rare, exotic foodstuffs from the far reaches of the cosmos", marvelous products conveying the "numinous power" suggested by their peculiarity. "The ability to command at will a spirit-hosted serving of exotic food and drink in elegant vessels may seem trivial, but when one recalls that many Daoist scriptures prohibit the feasting on sacrificial meats and liquors enjoyed by the aristocracy, and that many adepts did their work on mountains and were isolated from agricultural communities and markets, the practice assumes a more serious aspect."

=== Baopuzi ===
The c. 318 CE "Inner Chapters" of the Baopuzi (Master Who Embraces Simplicity) have nine occurrences of the word xingchu (行廚, Mobile Kitchen). Seven of them are in contexts of alchemical medicines and elixirs, most of which have poisonous toxic heavy metal ingredients. The Baopuzi uses two related verbs for beckoning a Mobile Kitchen: zhì (至, "arrive at; reach; come") and zhì (致, "cause to arrive at; get to; come to"). The other two xingchu usages are in proper names of a Daoist amulet and book, the Xingchu fu (行廚符, Amulet of the Traveling Kitchen), and the Xingchu jing (行廚經, Scripture of the Traveling Kitchen). The Baopuzi also lists another book titled Riyue chushi jing (日月廚食經, Scripture of the Kitchen Meals of the Sun and the Moon).

Three of the seven Baopuzi elixirs are said to have dual purpose usages, long-term consumption is said to grant xian transcendence, including the ability to summon xingchu, and short-term consumption provides a panacea—specifically for eliminating the Three Corpses or Three Worms, demons that live within the human body and hasten their host's death, and the Nine Worms or Nine Vermin, broadly meaning internal worms and parasites. First, the Xian Menzi dan (羡門子丹, Master Xian Men's Elixir) is prepared from wine and cinnabar. "After it has been taken for one day the Three Worms and all illnesses are immediately purged from the patient. If taken for three years, it will confer geniehood and one is sure to be served by two fairies, who can be employed to summon the Traveling Canteen [可役使致行廚]." Second, a list of methods for eating and drinking realgar says, "In each case it confers Fullness of Life; all illnesses are banished; the Three Corpses drop from the body; scars disappear; gray hair tums black; and lost teeth are regenerated. After a thousand days, fairies [translating yunu 玉女 Jade Maiden] will come to serve you and you can use them to summon the Traveling Canteen [以致行廚]." Third, consuming pure, unadulterated lacquer will put a man in communication with the gods and let him Enjoy Fullness of Life. When eaten with pieces of crab in mica or jade water, "The Nine Insects will then drop from you, and the bad blood will leave you through nose-bleeds. After a year, the six-chia gods and the Traveling Canteen will come to you [一年六甲行廚至也]." This liujia (六甲, Six Jia Gods) and the liuyin (六陰, Six Yin) below refer to astrological Dunjia divination. An alternate translation is "the six jia and the traveling canteen will arrive".

The remaining four Baopuzi formulas are said to create stronger and more versatile elixirs. Fourth, the Jiuguang dan (九光丹, Ninefold Radiance Elixir) is made by processing certain unspecified ingredients with the wushi (五石, Five Minerals, see Cold-Food Powder), i.e., cinnabar, realgar, purified potassium alum, laminar malachite, and magnetite. Each mineral is put through five alchemical cycles and assumes five hues, so that altogether twenty-five hues result, each with specific powers, for example, the blue elixir will revive a recently deceased person. "If you wish to summon the Traveling Canteen [欲致行廚], smear your left hand with a solution of black elixir; whatever you ask for will be at your beck and call, and everything you mention will arrive without effort. You will be able to summon any thing or any creature in the world." Fifth, the Baopuzi quotes from Shennong sijing (神農四經, Shennong's Four Classics), "Medicines of the highest type put the human body at ease and protract life so that people ascend and become gods in heaven, soar up and down in the air, and have all the spirits at their service. Their bodies grow feathers and wings, and the Traveling Canteen comes whenever they wish [行廚立至]." Sixth, the method of Wu Chengzi (務成子) compounds alchemical gold from realgar, yellow sand, and mercury, and then forms it into small pills. Coating the pills with different substances will produce magical effects, for instance, if one is smeared with ram's blood and thrown into a stream, "the fish and the dragons will come out immediately, and it will be easy to catch them." And, "If it is coated with hare's blood and placed in a spot belonging to the Six Yin, the Traveling Canteen and the fairies will appear immediately and place themselves at your disposal [行廚玉女立至], to a total of sixty or seventy individuals." Seventh, Liu Gen (劉根, or Liu Jun'an 劉君安), who Ware wrongly identifies as the Daoist prince and author Liu An (劉安), learned the art of metamorphosis from an alchemical text attributed to the Mohist founder Mozi, the Mozi wuxing ji (墨子五行記, Master Mo's Records of the Five Phases), and successfully used its medicines and amulets, "By grasping a pole he becomes a tree. He plants something, and it immediately produces edible melons or fruit. He draws a line on the ground, and it becomes a river; he piles up dirt and it becomes a hill. He sits down and causes the Traveling Canteen to arrive [坐致行廚]."

=== Shenxian zhuan ===
The c. 318 Shenxian zhuan (Hagiographies of Divine Transcendents) uses xingchu (行廚, Mobile Kitchen) six times. The hagiography of Wang Yuan gives a detailed description of summoning a xingchu. Other adepts who are also said to have this ability include Li Gen, Liu Jing, Zuo Ci, Liu Zheng, and Taixuan nü.

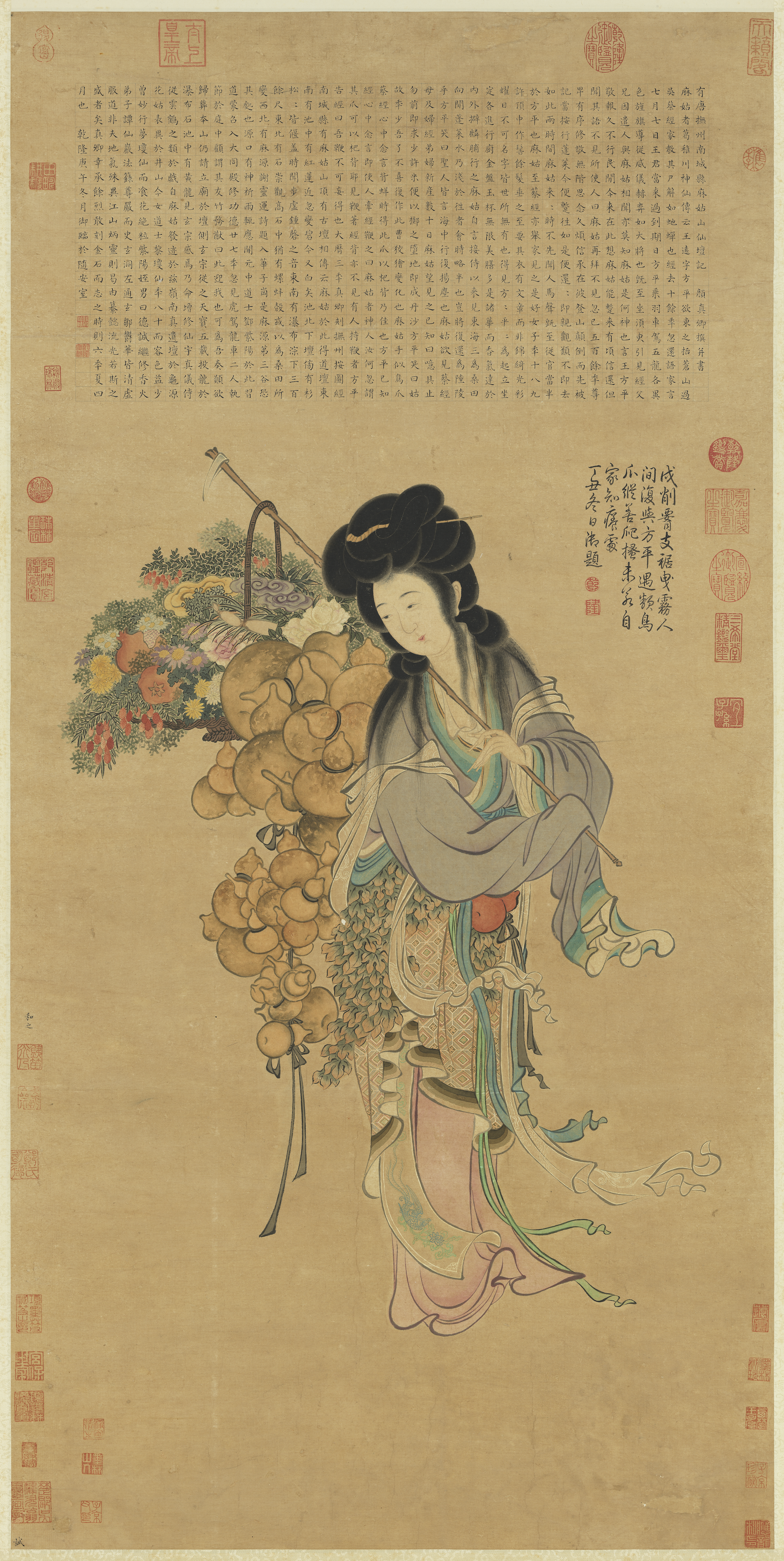
Portrait of the Immortal Magu (National Palace Museum, Taipei)

First, the hagiography of Wang Yuan (王遠) and Magu (Cannabis Maiden) says Wang was a Confucianist scholar who quit his official post during the reign (146–168 CE) of Emperor Huan of Han and went into the mountains to study Daoist techniques. Wang achieved xian transcendence through shijie "liberation by means of a simulated corpse", described with the traditional cicada metaphor, his "body disappeared; yet the cap and garments were completely undisturbed, like a cicada shell." During his travels, Wang met the peasant Cai Jing (蔡經), whose physiognomy indicated he was destined to become a transcendent, so Wang took him on as a disciple, taught him the basic techniques, and left. Soon afterwards Cai also used alchemical shijie liberation, his body became extremely hot, and his flesh and bones melted away for three days. "Suddenly he had vanished. When his family looked inside the blanket, only his outer skin was left, intact from head to foot, like a cicada shell."

After Cai had been gone for "over a decade", he unexpectedly returned home, looking like a young man, announced to his family that Lord Wang would visit on the "seventh day of the seventh month" (later associated with the Cowherd and Weaver Girl lovers' festival), and ordered them to "prepare great quantities of food and drink to offer to his attendants." When Wang Yuan and his heavenly entourage arrived on the auspicious "double-seven" day, he invited his old friend Magu to join their celebration because it had been over five hundred years since she had been "in the human realm." When the Cannabis Maiden and her attendants arrived at Cai's household,

She appeared to be a handsome woman of eighteen or nineteen; her hair was done up, and several loose strands hung down to her waist. Her gown had a pattern of colors, but it was not woven; it shimmered, dazzling the eyes, and was indescribable – it was not of this world. She approached and bowed to Wang, who bade her rise. When they were both seated, they called for the travelling canteen [坐定召進行廚]. The servings were piled up on gold platters and in jade cups without limit. There were rare delicacies, many of them made from flowers and fruits, and their fragrance permeated the air inside [Cai's home] and out. When the meat was sliced and served, [in flavor] it resembled broiled mo and was announced as kirin meat.

Compare Maspero's translation, "everyone steps forth to 'perform the Kitchen'". Guo Pu's commentary to the Classic of Mountains and Seas described the mò (貘, giant panda) as "bear-like, black and white, and metal-eating"; and the mystical qilin beast is sometimes identified as a Chinese unicorn.

Wang Yuan then announced to the Cai family that he had brought some exceptional wine from the Tianchu (天廚, Heavenly Kitchen) asterism.

I wish to present you all with a gift of fine liquor. This liquor has just been produced by the celestial kitchens. Its flavor is quite strong, so it is unfit for drinking by ordinary people; in fact, in some cases it has been known to burn people's intestines. You should mix it with water, and you should not regard this as inappropriate." With that, he added a dou of water to a sheng of liquor, stirred it, and presented it to the members of Cai Jing's family. On drinking little more than a sheng of it each, they were all intoxicated. After a little while, the liquor was all gone.

In traditional Chinese units of measurement, a dǒu ( 斗) was approximately equivalent to 10 liters and a shēng 升) approximately 1 liter.

Second, the Shenxian zhuan narrative of Li Gen (李根) says he studied under Wu Dawen (吳大文) and obtained a method for producing alchemical gold and silver.

Li Gen could transform himself [into other forms] and could enter water and fire [without harm]. He could sit down and cause the traveling canteen to arrive, and with it could serve twenty guests [坐致行廚能供二十人]. All the dishes were finely prepared, and all of them contained strange and marvelous foods from the four directions, not things that were locally available.

Third, Liu Jing (劉京) was an official under Emperor Wen of Han (r. 180–157 BCE) who "abandoned the world and followed Lord Zhang 張君 of Handan to study the Way." By using methods for subsisting on "efflorescence of vermilion" pills [朱英丸] and "cloud-mother [mica]" pills, Liu "lived to be one hundred thirty years old. To look at him, one would judge him to be a person in his thirties." He could also foretell the auspiciousness of future events.

The Shangqing (Supreme Purity) tradition Han Wu Di neizhuan (漢武帝内傳, Esoteric Traditions of Han Emperor Wu), which was written between 370 and 500, has some later accretions that resemble Shenxian zhuan. The passage about Liu Jing says,

Later he served Ji Zixun [薊子訓, i.e., Ji Liao 薊遼] as his teacher. Zixun transmitted to him all the secret essentials of the Five Thearchs, Numinous Flight (lingfei, 靈飛), the six jia spirits, the Twelve Matters (shier shi 十二事), and the Perfected Forms of the Ten Continents of Divine Transcendents (shenxian shizhou zhenxiang 神仙十洲真形). Liu Jing practiced them all according to the instructions, and they were mightily efficacious. He could summon ghosts and spirits, immediately cause wind and rain to arise, cause the traveling canteen to arrive [名致行廚], and appear and disappear at will. He also knew the auspiciousness or inauspiciousness of people's future affairs and of particular days.

Fourth, the transcendent Zuo Ci (左慈) was a fangshi ("method master") famous for his abilities at divination, fenshen multilocation, and shapeshifting,

Seeing that the fortunes of the Han house were about to decline, he sighed and said, "As we move into this declining [astral] configuration, those who hold eminent offices are in peril, and those of lofty talent will die. Winning glory in this present age is not something to be coveted." So he studied arts of the Dao. He understood particularly well [how to summon] the six jia spirits, how to dispatch ghosts and other spirits, and how to sit down and call for the traveling canteen [坐致行廚].

Fifth, the Shenxian zhuan says that Liu Zheng (劉政) used the same alchemical text attributed to Mozi that the Baopuzi says was used by Liu Gen (劉根, or Liu Jun'an 劉君安.

Later he arranged [a copy of] Master Mo's Treatise on the Five Phases (Mozi wuxing ji 墨子五行記) and, [based on it], ingested "efflorescence of vermilion" pills. He lived for more than one hundred eighty years, and his complexion was that of a youth. He could transform himself into other shapes and conceal his form; multiply one person into a hundred or a hundred into a thousand or a thousand into ten thousand; conceal a military force of three brigades by forming them into a forest or into birds and beasts, so that they could easily take their opponents' weapons without their knowledge. Further, he was capable of planting fruits of all types and causing them immediately to flower and ripen so as to be ready to eat. He could sit down and cause the traveling canteen to arrive [生致行廚], setting out a complete meal for up to several hundred people. His mere whistling could create a wind to set dust swirling and blow stones about.

Transcendental whistling was an ancient Daoist yogic technique.

Sixth, the brief hagiography of the female transcendent Taixuan nü (太玄女, Woman of the Grand Mystery) says.

The Woman of the Grand Mystery was surnamed Zhuan 顓 and named He 和. While still young, she was bereaved of her husband, so she practiced the Way. Disciplining herself in the arts of the Jade Master, (Yuzi) she could sit down and cause the traveling canteen to arrive [坐致行廚], and there was no sort of transformation she could not accomplish.

In addition, the Shenxian zhuan hagiography for Mao Ying (茅盈) describes what sounds like a xingchu without using the name. After twenty years studying the Dao, Mao Ying returned home to his parents and announced that he had been commanded to enter heaven and become a transcendent. The people of his home village came to give him a going-away party, and Mao said,

"I am touched by your sincere willingness to send me off, and I deeply appreciate your intention. But please come empty-handed; you need not make any expenditure. I have a means whereby to provide a feast for us all." On the appointed day, the guests all arrived, and a great banquet was held. Awnings of blue brocade were spread out, and layers of white felt were spread out beneath them. Rare delicacies and strange fruits were piled up and arrayed. Female entertainers provided music; the sounds of metal and stone mingled together, and the din shook Heaven and Earth; it could be heard from several li away. Of the more than one thousand guests present that day, none failed to leave intoxicated and sated.

Mao Ying and his brothers Mao Gu (茅固) and Mao Zhong (茅衷) are considered of the founders of the Shangqing School of Daoism.

Shangqing Daoists took the stock literary phrase zuo zhi xingchu (坐致行廚)—used above in the Baopuzi for Liu Gen, "sits down and causes the Traveling Canteen to arrive", and in the Shenxian zhuan for Li Gen, Zuo Ci, and Taixuan nü, "sit down and cause the traveling canteen to arrive"—and actualized it as a visualization technique for "making the movable cuisines come [while] sitting [in meditation]". "This method, accessible only to the initiate who possessed the proper series of talismans (fu 符) and had mastered certain visualization techniques, conferred powers to become invisible, to cause thunder, and to call for rain." This form of sitting meditation was so popular during the Tang period that Chinese Esoteric Buddhism also adopted it.

== Wuchu Five Kitchens meditation ==
Following upon the Celestial Masters liturgical Kitchen feasts and xian transcendents' Mobile Kitchens, the third stage of Daoist chu traditions was the Tang dynasty (618–907) wǔchú (五廚, Five Kitchens) contemplation technique, which recast the concept of ritual banquets in terms of psychophysiological neidan Internal Alchemy. In Chinese cosmological wuxing Five Phases correspondence theory, the wuchu Five Kitchens or wuzang (五臟, Five Viscera / Orbs) system includes not only the physiological internal organs (lungs, kidneys, liver, gallbladder, and spleen), but also the associated psychological range of mental and emotional states. The 735 Wuchu jing (五廚經, Scripture of the Five Kitchens), which poetically describes a visualization practice for circulating qi energies through the Five Viscera, was so popular that Tang Buddhists forged the esoteric Sānchú jīng (三廚經, Sutra of the Three Kitchens) based on the Daoist text.

There are two extant editions of Wuchu jing translated by Livia Kohn. First, the 763 Tang Daozang (Daoist Canon) edition titled Laozi shuo Wuchu jing zhu (老子說五廚經, Commentary to the Scripture of the Five Kitchens as Revealed by Laozi) contains a preface dated 735 and a commentary, both signed by Yin Yin (尹愔, d. 741). The reduplicatedly named Yin Yin was a prominent Daoist and Confucian scholar under Emperor Xuanzong of Tang (r. 712–756), and abbot of the Suming guan (肅明觀, Abbey of Reviving Light) temple in the capital Chang'an. The late Tang Celestial Master Zhao Xianfu (趙仙甫, fl. 732) also wrote a commentary. Second, the 1019 Yunji Qiqian (Seven Bamboo Tablets of the Cloudy Satchel) anthology edition titled Wuchu jing qifa (五廚經氣法, Energetic Methods of the Scripture of the Five Kitchens), also includes Yin's commentary, with slight variations, such as noting the text was presented to the emperor in 736. The qi "energetic" methods of the text are recommended by Sima Chengzhen (司馬承禎, 647–735) in his Fuqi jingyi lun (服氣精義論, Essay on the Essential Meaning of Breath Ingestion) text on physical self-cultivation. Although the presence of Yin's preface might suggest a Tang date for the Wuchu jing, the origins of this text may be much earlier. Ge Hong's c. 318 Baopuzi mentions a Xingchu jing (行廚經, Scripture of the Movable Kitchens) and a Riyue chushi jing (日月廚食經, Scripture of the Kitchen Meals for the Sun and the Moon), which could be the ancestors of the received texts.

The c. 905 Daojiao lingyan ji (道教靈驗記, Record of Daoist Miracles), written by the Daoist priest, author, and court official Du Guangting, says a Buddhist monk fraudulently transformed the Wuchu jing Scripture of the Five Kitchens into the Sanchu jing (三廚經, Sutra of the Three Kitchens). Du records that the Chinese Buddhist canon of the Tang period contained a text titled Fo shuo san tingchu jing (佛說三停廚經, Sutra of the Three Interrupted Kitchens, Preached by the Buddha). According to Du Guangting, the monk Xingduan (行端), who had "a presumptuous and fraudulent disposition", saw that the widely circulated Daoist Wuchu jing consisted of five stanzas (jì 偈, "gatha; poetic verse; versified utterance") of incantations (zhòu 咒, "mantra; religious incantation; mystical invocation"), rearranged them, and expanded the title into Fo shuo san tingchu jing (佛說三停廚經). "The five incantations he turned into 'five sutras spoken by Tathagata,' and at the end he added a hymn. The additional phrases amounted to no less than a page." Verellen suggests that the scripture, with its "Buddho-Daoist content and quasi-magical use", originated as a late Six Dynasties (220–589) Tantric zhoujing (咒經, "incantations scripture", cf. the Divine Incantations Scripture).

Du Guangting gives a lengthy narrative about the Daoist miracle involving supernatural retribution for Xingduan's forgery. One day after the monk had already given several copies of the altered scripture to others, a "divine being eight or nine feet tall" and holding a sword reprimands him for the counterfeiting and brandishes his sword to strike the monk. As Xingduan "wards off the blow with his hand, several fingers are lopped off", he begs for mercy, and the Daoist deity agrees to spare his life if he retrieves and destroys all the fakes. Xingduan and his companions search everywhere for the texts, but can only find half of them, the remainder having already been carried abroad by Buddhist monks. Xingduan prepares ten fresh copies of the original scripture, offers incense, repents, and burns the altered copies. Then the divine being reappears and announces: "Having vilified the sage's text, restitution won't save you—you do not deserve to escape death", the monk falls prostrate and dies on the spot.

In the present day, early copies of this apocryphal Buddhist sutra have been preserved. Four textual versions were discovered in the Chinese Dunhuang manuscripts, two versions, dated 1099 and 1270, are kept in the Japanese Mount Kōya manuscripts. In addition, the modern Japanese Taishō Tripiṭaka canon includes the text.

The highly abstract Wuchu jing mystical poem comprises five stanzas consisting of four five-character lines each. The Yunqi qiqian edition shows that the five stanzas were associated with the Five Directions of space: east (lines 1–4), south (lines 5–8), north (lines 9–12), west (lines 13–16), and center (lines 17–20). For example, the first four lines:

一氣和泰和
得一道皆泰
和乃無一和
玄理同玄際

Translation:

The qi of universal oneness merges with the harmony of cosmic peace.
Attaining universal oneness, Dao rests in cosmic peace.
Cosmic harmony really is neither universal oneness nor harmony.
Mysterious cosmic order joins the mysterious moment of eternity.

The content of the Wuchu jing guides adepts toward a detached mental state of non-thinking and equanimity. The Five Kitchens refer to neidan Internal Alchemy "qi-processing on a subtle-body level", and signify the energetic, transformative power of the Five Viscera. Yin Yin's introduction says,

As long as you dwell in the qi of universal oneness [一氣] and in the harmony of cosmic peace [泰和], the five organs [五臟] are abundant and full and the five spirits [五神] are still and upright. "When the five organs are abundant, all sensory experiences are satisfied; when the five spirits are still, all cravings and desires are eliminated. This scripture expounds on how the five organs taking in qi is like someone looking for food in a kitchen. Thus, its title: "Scripture of the Five Kitchens."

Commenting on Yin's interpretation, Du Guangting claims more explicitly that practicing this scripture will enable an adept to stop eating.

Techniques in the Wuchu jing (五廚經, Scripture of the Five Kitchens) mainly involve visualizing the Five Viscera of the body and chanting incantations. These methods supposedly allow the adept to obtain satisfaction and harmony, and, after some years of training, even transcendence. Despite this concern with the human body, the text strongly emphasizes mental restructuring over physical practices, saying that "accumulating cultivation will not get you to detachment" and that methods of ingestion are ultimately useless. However, reciting the scripture is beneficial, especially if combined with mental and ethical practices, so that "you will easily get the true essentials of cultivating the body-self and protecting life." More specifically, chanting the text one hundred times and practicing the harmonization of the five qi allows adepts to abstain from grain and eliminate hunger. Many present-day Daoists consider the Wuchu jing as a talismanic text to be chanted for protection.
