= Eight Immortals from Sichuan =

Eight Immortals from Sichuan (Chinese: 蜀中八仙; pinyin: Shǔ zhōng bāxiān) are eight Sichuanese who supposedly became xian ("immortals; transcendents; fairies"). The term is first used by Qiao Xiu (譙秀 qiáo xiù) in Record of Shu (《蜀紀》 shǔ zì) written in Jin Dynasty.

They are:

- Fàn Chángshēng (范长生),
- Dǒng Zhòngshū (董仲舒),
- Lǐ Bābǎi (李八百),
- Lǐ Ěr (李耳),
- Ěrzhū Xiānshēng (尔朱先生),
- Róng Chénggōng (容成公),
- Zhāng Dàolīng (张道陵), and
- Yán Jūnpíng (严君平).
