= Li Hong (Taoism) =

Messianic figure in religious Taoism

Li Hong (Chinese: 李弘) is a soteriological, messianic figure in religious Daoist prophecies. He is believed to manifest at the end of world cycles to rescue the chosen people, and would be distinguished by certain signs including talismans, practices, and virtues.

== Daoist texts ==
The body of myths surrounding Li Hong took shape in Chinese literature during the Han dynasty. He is depicted in the Daoist Divine Incantations Scripture as one who would reappear to set right heaven (tiān) and earth (dì) at a time of upheaval and chaos.

== Rebellions ==
Prophecies concerning Li Hong’s appearance have been used to legitimize numerous rebellions and insurgencies, all of which rallied around charismatic individuals claimed to be “Li Hong”. These were particularly prevalent in the fifth century, and continued to appear until the Song dynasty.

== See also ==
- Chinese salvationist religions – Chinese religious tradition characterised by a concern for salvation of the person and the society
- House of Li – Chinese royal family
- Li (surname 李) – Chinese surname
- Way of the Li Family – Daoist denomination
- Yellow Turban Rebellion – Peasant revolt against the Eastern Han dynasty
