= Wuliupai =

School of Taoism focused on internal alchemy

Wu-liu pai (Chinese: 伍柳派; pinyin: Wǔliǔpài; lit. 'School of Wu [Chong-xu]-Liu [Hua-yang]'), or Wu-liu fa pai (Chinese: 伍柳法派; pinyin: Wǔliǔfǎpài; lit. 'School of Teachings of Wu [Chong-xu]-Liu [Hua-yang]'), also known as Xianfo (Chinese: 仙佛; pinyin: Xiānfó; lit. '[School] of Immortals and Buddhas') — a school of Taoism with main focus on internal alchemy (neidan).

== Main principles ==
The school's doctrine is related in the works of the school's founders: "Common Teachings of Immortals and Buddhas" and "True Principles of Heavenly Immortality" by Wu Chongxu; and also in "Book of Understanding Life" and "Confirmatory Teachings of Golden Immortals" by Liu Huayang. The school puts its main emphasis on the practice of internal alchemy, in order to realise Tao, thus achieving a status of "an immortal and a buddha". A distinctive trait of the school is its postulated identity of Taoist principles with those of early Chan Buddhism. As E. A. Torchinov noted in the foreword to his translation of Zhang Bo-duan's "Chapters of Understanding Life", "With time the immortals came to be regarded as taoist counterparts of Buddhas, which have led to creation of syncretical schools (albeit dominated by Taoism) of Immortals and Buddhas (xianfo) in 16th-17th centuries; in these schools tenets of Buddhist doctrine were only perceived through the lens of taoist tradition."

== Translated canons ==
A canon of the school translated and printed in several European languages is the "Book of Understanding Life" by Liu Hua-yang. It was first translated into German and published in 1926 under the title of "Liu Hua Yang, Hui Ming King. Das Buch von Bewusstsein und Leben". Later this German translation was translated into French, and printed in 1934 with title of "Lieou Hua Yang. Le Livre de la Conscience et de la Vie". The Russian translation was made by V.V Maliavin and was included into "Ascending towards Tao: a Compendium (Chen Kai-guo, Zhen Shun-chao)" under the title of "Book of Consciousness and Life". A translation from the German by Carl F. Baynes as 'The Book of Consciousness and Life' was added to "The Secret of the Golden Flower" and published in 1962 by Routledge & Kegan Paul, London. There is also a direct translation by Eva Wong, titled "Cultivating the Energy of Life".

== The History of The School ==
The Wu-Liu Pai school was established in 16th-17th centuries at the time of Ming dynasty being succeeded by the Qing dynasty. The founders of the school are believed to be the Taoist Wu Chung-xu (Shou-yang) initially from the Dragon Gate school, which is a sub-sect of the Complete Reality school; and his student Liu Hua-yang, a Chan monk who converted to Taoism; both were originally from Yuzhan (now Nanchang).

== Later Branches of the School ==
One of the more widely known of such lines of transmission is the Qian Feng Pai or Thousand Peaks school, whose popularity stems from a book by Zhao Bi-chen "Secrets of cultivation of Life and Destiny". This book was translated into English by Lu K'uan Yu, known also as Charles Luk and published under the title "Taoist Yoga, Alchemy and Immortality". The orthodox Wu-Liu Pai school does not recognize Qian Feng Pai as preserving the full transmission.

== The Wu-Liu Pai school in Russia ==
Since September 2007 there is an officially functioning school branch in Saint-Petersburg, Russia. There are branches in several cities of Russia and of former USSR countries.

== Bibliography ==
- Torchinov Е.А. St.P.: Andreev I Sinovia, 1993 (2nd enlarged edition: St. P.: Lan, 1998). — In Russian.
- Wu Chong-xu — In Chinese.
- Wu Chong-xu — In Chinese.
- Liu Hua-yang — In Chinese.
- Liu Hua-yang — In Chinese.
