= Divine Incantations Scripture =

Apocalyptic Taoist text

The Divine Incantations Scripture (Note: simplified Chinese: 太上洞渊神咒经; traditional Chinese: 太上洞淵神咒經; pinyin: Tàishàng dòngyuān shénzhòu jīng; Wade–Giles: T'ai-shang shen-chou ching; lit. 'Most High Cavernous Abyss Divine Spells Scripture'.) is the oldest-known Chinese classic text that details an apocalypse.

== History ==
The earliest portions of the book have been traced to the beginning of the fifth century CE, with subsequent commentary attesting an origin in the early fourth; the book likely integrates older traditions.

These traditions offered a new route to transcendence that was different from the Way of the Celestial Masters from which it branched. The Divine Incantations Scripture sought to clarify the general function of gods as "merely the officials of the celestial bureaucracy". It also mentions Li Hong – a messianic liberator who appears at the chaotic endings of time cycles to restore order in heaven and on earth.

This text was unique for its time in that it promised the aid of celestial "ghost troops" to aid upholders of its teachings, and acknowledged the dynamic obedience and simultaneous danger of various "daemon kings" that also inhabited a fantastical version of the metaphysical world. These characteristics draw interesting parallels with the cosmic and celestial warfare depicted in the Book of Revelation completing the New Testament canon of the Christian Bible. The book also urges Daoists to "assiduously convert the unenlightened", and demands scriptural exclusivity in receiving the Divine Incantations Scripture.
