= Jingming Dao =

Chinese Daoist school

Jingming Dao (Chinese: 淨明道; pinyin: jingming dao; lit. 'purity and light Daoism') or Jingming Zhongxiao Daoism (Chinese: 淨明忠孝道; lit. 'Daoism of purity and light', 'loyalty', 'and filial piety') was a Daoist school dating back to the Southern Song Dynasty. It was founded by He Zhengong (周真公) and emerged from the Lingbao school. Xu Xun (239–374) of the Jin Dynasty was revered as its first patriarch. It was influential during the Yuan and Ming dynasties and was particularly widespread in the area of Jiangnan, i.e. south of the lower reaches of the Yangtze River. Its center was in the Western Mountains in Nanchang, Jiangxi Province.
