= Hong Zicheng =

Hong Zicheng (simplified Chinese: 洪自诚; traditional Chinese: 洪自誠; pinyin: Hóng Zìchéng; Wade–Giles: Hung Tzu-Ch'eng, fl. 1572–1620) was a Chinese philosopher who lived during the end of the Ming dynasty.

Zicheng (自誠) was Hong's zi (字, 'courtesy name'); his given name was Hong Yingming (Hung Ying-ming, 洪應明), and his hao (號, 'pseudonym') was Huanchu Daoren (Huan-ch'u Tao-jen, 還初道人, 'Daoist Adept who Returns to the Origin').

Hong Zicheng wrote the Caigentan, the Xianfo qizong, and several no-longer extant books. The c. 1590 Caigentan (菜根譚, 'Vegetable Roots Discourse') is an eclectic compilation of philosophical aphorisms that combine elements from Confucianism, Daoism, and Chan Buddhism. The 1602 Xianfo qizong (仙佛奇蹤, 'Marvelous Traces of Transcendents and Buddhas') contains legends about Daoist and Buddhist masters. The Qing dynasty catalog to the Siku Quanshu summarizes the Xianfo qizong:

It covers episodes of about sixty-three Daoists from Laozi to Zhang Sanfeng; comments on immortality; nineteen patriarchs of Indian Buddhism, from Sakyamuni to Prajnatara (c. 457), and forty-two patriarchs of Chan Buddhism, from Bodhidharma (c. 502) to Chuanzi 船子 (ninth century); and mysteries of eternity.

— tr. Aitken and Kwok 2006:173, cf. Vos 1993:170

Hong is a historically enigmatic figure. "Nothing is known about his life and career", write Goodrich and Fang (1976:678), except that he was a contemporary of Yu Kongqian (于孔兼), both of whom flourished during the Wanli Emperor's reign (1572–1620). Yu Kongjian was a high-ranking scholar-bureaucrat in Wanli's administration, but he resigned in 1588 after involvement in a controversy, returned to his birthplace in Jintan (Jiangsu Province), and devoted himself to writing and teaching, including lectures at the Donglin Academy. Yu's preface to the Caigentan provides the only early information about Hong Zicheng's life.

One day my friend Hung Tzu-ch'eng appeared with his Ts'ai-ken t'an which he showed to me begging me for a preface. ... The fact that he uses the words "vegetable roots" to designate his discourse has its origin in his purifying experience of poverty, and is also based upon a comparison of the cultivation of human morality with that of plants. One can imagine that the author has been harassed by the storms of life and has endured several precarious situations. Master Hung says [paraphrasing 1:91]: "If Heaven makes me suffer physically, I set my mind at rest and supplement my physical frailty in this way. If Heaven tries me by adversity, I stick to my principles to the utmost and withstand the setbacks in this way." From this we can infer that he admonishes and stimulates himself.

— tr. Vos 1993:171–172

"We glean from this work that Hong might have suffered, like his friend Yu Kongjian," say Aitken and Kwok (2006:173), "a disappointing departure from official life joining the increasing ranks of recluses in the towns and lake areas of the lower Yangzi River region."

Modern research (Lo 2002:136) suggests that Hong might have been a native of Xindu District of Chengdu (Sichuan Province).
