= Li Rong (philosopher) =

Li Rong (Chinese: 李榮; pinyin: Lǐ Róng; fl. 658–663) was a Chinese philosopher from the Tang dynasty. He compiled a commentary on the Taoist book Tao Te Ching, called the Laozi Commentary by Li Rong (Chinese: 老子李榮注; pinyin: Lǎozǐ Lǐróng Zhù).
