= Qi Qi =

Qi Qi may refer to:

- Qi Qi (dolphin) (淇淇)
- Qi Qi (gymnast) (祁琦)
- Qi Qi (host) (琪琪)
- Qiqi (tilting vessel) (欹器)
