= Qiqi =

Qiqi may refer to:

- Rong Qiqi (Chinese: 荣启期)
- Yuan Qiqi (Chinese: 袁琦琦)
- Qi Qi (host) (Chinese: 琪琪), a Singaporean television host and radio deejay
- Qiqi (tilting vessel) (Chinese: 欹器), an ancient Chinese ceremonial utensil
- Qiqi, a character in 2020 video game Genshin Impact
- Qi Qi, the last known Baiji
