= Kongzi Jiayu =

Family Sayings of Confucius by Kong Anguo

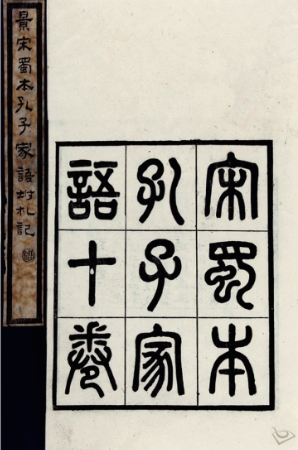
- Cover of an 1895 printed edition of the Kongzi Jiayu
- Author: Kong Anguo (attributed); Wang Su (editor)
- Original title: 孔子家語
- Language: Classical Chinese
- Subject: Sayings of Confucius
- Publication place: Han China

Kongzi Jiayu
- Traditional Chinese: 孔子家語
- Simplified Chinese: 孔子家语
- Literal meaning: Master Kong's school sayings
Transcriptions
Standard Mandarin
- Hanyu Pinyin: Kǒngzǐ Jiāyǔ
- Wade–Giles: K'ung Tzu Chia Yü
- IPA: [kʰʊ̀ŋ.tsì tɕjá.ỳ]
Yue: Cantonese
- Jyutping: hung2 zi2 gaa1 jyu5
Eastern Min
- Fuzhou BUC: Kūng-cṳ̄ Gă-ngṳ̄
Middle Chinese
- Middle Chinese: /kʰuŋ^{X} t͡sɨ^{X} kˠa ŋɨʌ^{H}/

The Kongzi Jiayu (Chinese: 孔子家語), translated as The School Sayings of Confucius or Family Sayings of Confucius, is a collection of sayings of Confucius (Kongzi), written as a supplement to the Analects (Lunyu).

A book by the title had existed since at least the early Han dynasty (206 BC – 220 AD), and was listed in the 1st-century imperial bibliography Yiwenzhi with 27 scrolls. The extant version, however, was thought by later scholars to have been compiled by the Cao Wei official-scholar Wang Su (195–256 AD), and contains 10 scrolls and 44 sections. Thus, Chinese scholars had long concluded that the received text was a 3rd-century forgery by Wang Su that had nothing to do with the original text of the same title. However, this verdict has been overturned by archaeological discoveries of Western Han dynasty tombs at Dingzhou (55 BC) and Shuanggudui (165 BC).

== Contents ==
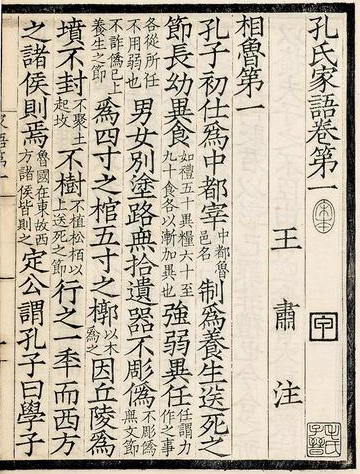
Section 1: Being Councillor in Lu

In the postface to the Kongzi Jiayu, its author describes the collection as discussions Confucius had with his disciples and others, recorded by his disciples. Selected discussions were published as the Analects (Lunyu), while the rest was collected in the Jiayu. This characterization is consistent with the content of the Jiayu, which contains nearly all the Confucian lore found in such diverse ancient texts as the Zuozhuan, Guoyu, Mencius, Han Feizi, Book of Rites, Han Shi Waizhuan, Lüshi Chunqiu, Huainanzi, etc., except what is included in the Analects, the Classic of Filial Piety, and a few other works.

The topics covered by the Kongzi Jiayu include Confucius' detailed ancestry, his parents, his birth, episodes and events from his life, and his sayings. His disciples also feature prominently, including one section devoted entirely to Yan Hui, Confucius' favourite. In all, 76 disciples are mentioned by name.

== Influence and controversy ==
The postface to the Kongzi Jiayu asserts that it was compiled by Kong Anguo, an influential scholar and descendant of Confucius who lived in the 2nd century BC, from actual recordings of Confucius' sayings made by his disciples. Soon after Wang Su, who was a critic of the scholar Zheng Xuan, published his version of the Jiayu, Ma Zhao (馬昭), a follower of Zheng, declared that it had been "amended and enlarged" by Wang.

Despite lingering doubts about its authenticity, the Jiayu was influential throughout the Tang and Song dynasties. Sima Zhen, author of an important commentary to Sima Qian's Shiji, valued it as highly as the Shiji itself. Zhu Xi, the leading Neo-Confucianist, also held it in high regard.

A new rationalist intellectual movement, Han learning, gained influence during the Qing dynasty and began a thorough criticism of the Kongzi Jiayu and other purportedly authentic ancient works. A large number of scholars, including Sun Zhizu (孫志祖), Fan Jiaxiang (范家相), Yao Jiheng (姚際恒), Cui Shu (崔述), Pi Xirui (皮錫瑞), Wang Pinzhen (王聘珍), and Ding Yan, all reached the same verdict that the Jiayu was a forgery. Sun and Fan both wrote detailed analyses supporting their conclusion. Although the Jiayu had its defenders, represented by Chen Shike (陳士珂), they were a small minority.

In the 20th century, Gu Jiegang, the leading force of the highly influential Doubting Antiquity School, reaffirmed the Qing scholars' conclusion that the Kongzi Jiayu was a forgery by Wang Su, and called it "worthless" for the study of Confucius. As a result, few modern scholars studied the work. However this view, would later be overturned by archaeological discoveries.

== Western scholarship ==
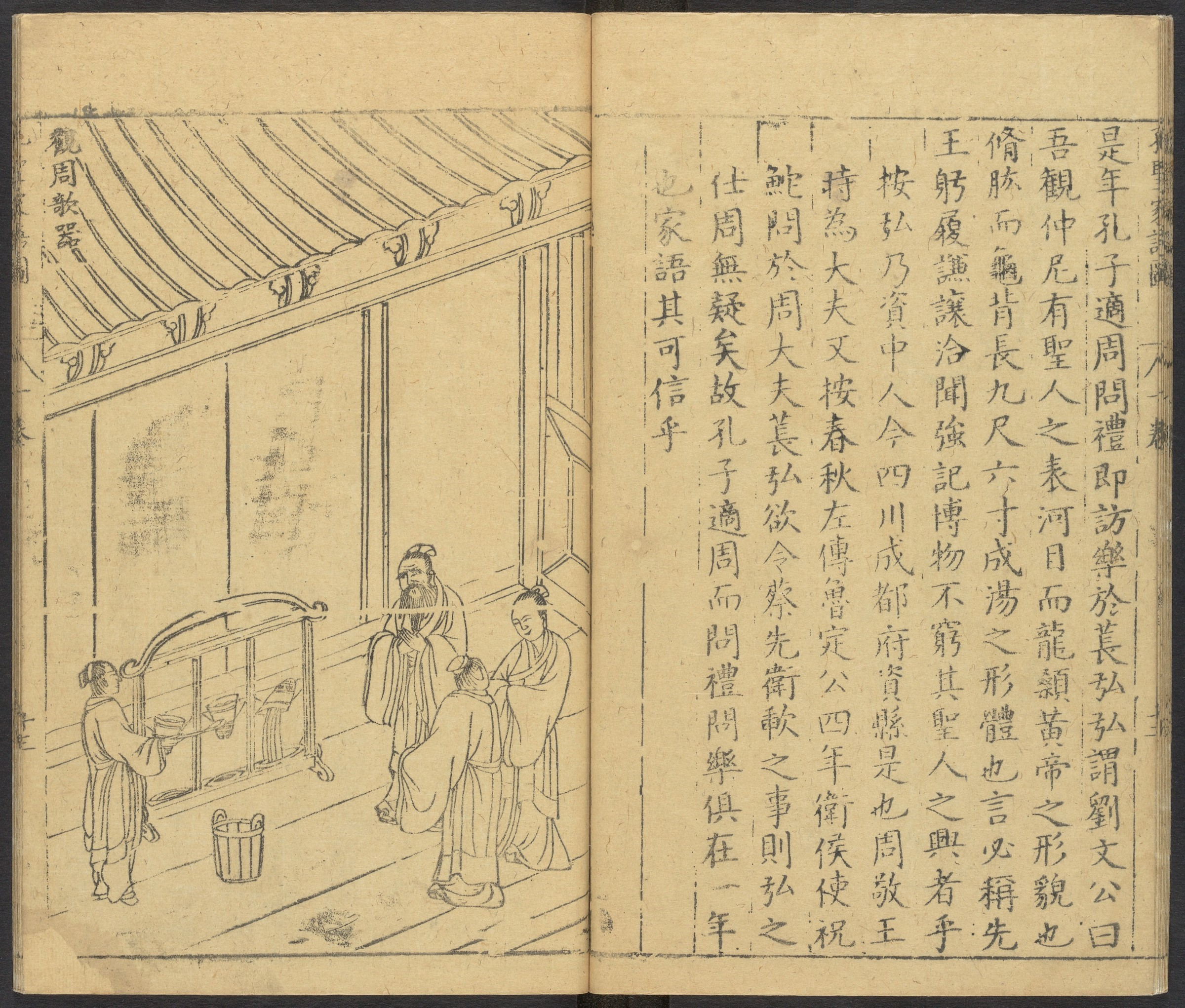
Print version of the Kongzi Jiayu (1589) depicting Confucius and his students examining a qiqi (tilting vessel)

Due to the controversy surrounding the Kongzi Jiayu, and the fact that much of its content was known from other ancient texts, early Western sinologists did not pay much attention to the work. A few, however, including James Legge, Alfred Forke, and Richard Wilhelm, believed the Jiayu to be authentic, despite the forgery verdict reached by Chinese scholars.

Robert Paul Kramers translated the first ten sections of the Kongzi Jiayu into English, published in 1950 under the title K'ung Tzu Chia Yü: The School Sayings of Confucius. In his introduction, Kramers rejects the possibility that Wang Su may have forged the entire work.

== Archaeological discoveries ==
In 1973, Chinese archaeologists excavated a large Western Han dynasty tomb in Bajiaolang, Dingzhou, Hebei province, which was dated to 55 BC. Among the bamboo strips discovered in the tomb was a text entitled Ru Jia Zhe Yan (Chinese: 儒家者言, "Words of the Ru (Confucian) Lineage"), which bears great similarities to the Kongzi Jiayu.

In 1977, archaeologists discovered the Shuanggudui tomb, sealed in 165 BC, in Fuyang, Anhui province. A wooden board found in the tomb contains the table of contents of Ru Jia Zhe Yan, which is also very similar to the received text of the Kongzi Jiayu.

These archaeological discoveries, together with research on the Shanghai Museum bamboo slips, and publication of the Kongzi Jiayu text from the Dunhuang manuscripts in the British Library, have convinced many scholars that the received text of the Kongzi Jiayu could not have been forged by Wang Su, and could well have been compiled by Kong Anguo, as Wang had claimed. Scholars are now paying renewed attention to the text. Yang Chaoming (楊朝明), author of the 2005 book Kongzi Jiayu Tongjie (孔子家語通解), considers the Kongzi Jiayu no less valuable than the Analects to the study of Confucius.

== Bibliography ==
- Goldin, Paul Rakita (1999). Rituals of the Way: The Philosophy of Xunzi. Open Court Publishing. ISBN 978-0-8126-9400-0.
- Kramers, Robert Paul (1950). K'ung Tzu Chia Yü: The School Sayings of Confucius. Brill Archive.
- Mair, Victor H. (ed.) (2001). The Columbia History of Chinese Literature. New York: Columbia University Press. ISBN 0-231-10984-9. (Amazon Kindle edition.)
- Shaughnessy, Edward L. (2014). Unearthing the Changes: Recently Discovered Manuscripts of the Yi Jing ( I Ching) and Related Texts. Columbia University Press. p. 190. ISBN 978-0-231-16184-8.
- Shen, Vincent (2013). Dao Companion to Classical Confucian Philosophy. Springer Science & Business Media. ISBN 978-90-481-2936-2.
- Van Els, Paul (2009). "Dingzhou: The Story of an Unfortunate Tomb" (PDF). Asiatische Studien/Études Asiatiques. 63 (4): 909–941. Archived from the original (PDF) on 2021-05-19.
