= Shishi-odoshi =

Japanese devices made to frighten animals that pose a threat to agriculture

A shishi-odoshi breaks the quietness of a Japanese garden with the sound of a bamboo rocker arm hitting a rock.

Shishi-odoshi (鹿威し) (literally, "deer-frightening" or "boar-frightening"), in a wide sense, refers to Japanese devices made to frighten away animals that pose a threat to agriculture, including kakashi (scarecrows), naruko (clappers) and sōzu. In a narrower sense, it is synonymous with sōzu.

A sōzu is a type of water fountain used in Japanese gardens. It consists of a segmented tube, usually of bamboo, pivoted to one side of its balance point. At rest, its heavier end is down and resting against a rock. A trickle of water into the upper end of the tube accumulates and eventually moves the tube's centre of gravity past the pivot, causing the tube to rotate and dump out the water. The heavier end then falls back against the rock, making a sharp sound, and the cycle is repeated.

These fountains were originally intended to startle any herbivores, such as deer or boars, which might be grazing on the plants in the garden, but shishi-odoshi are now a part of the visual and aural design of gardens, and are used primarily for their aesthetic value.

== Gallery ==
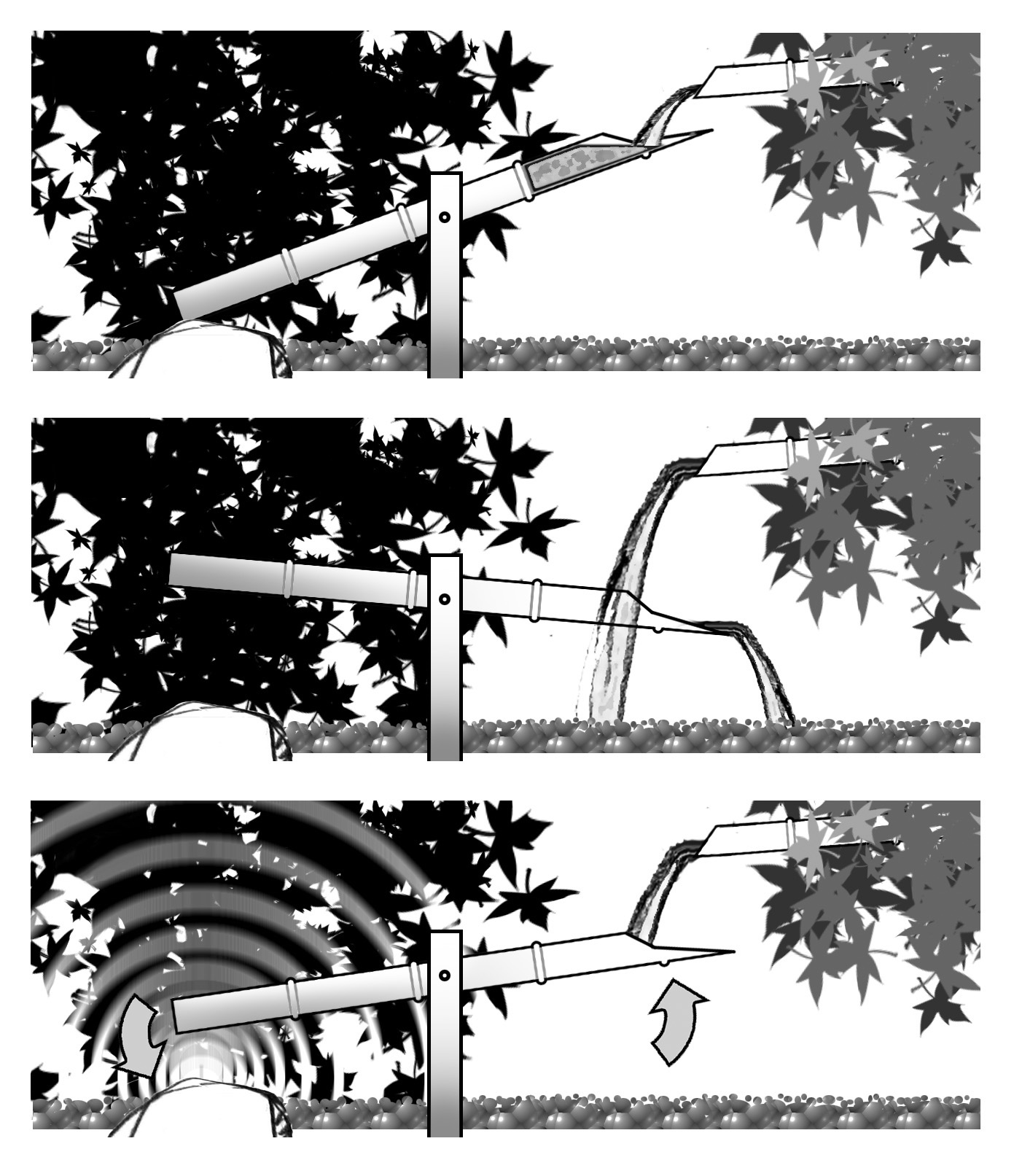
Diagram of operation

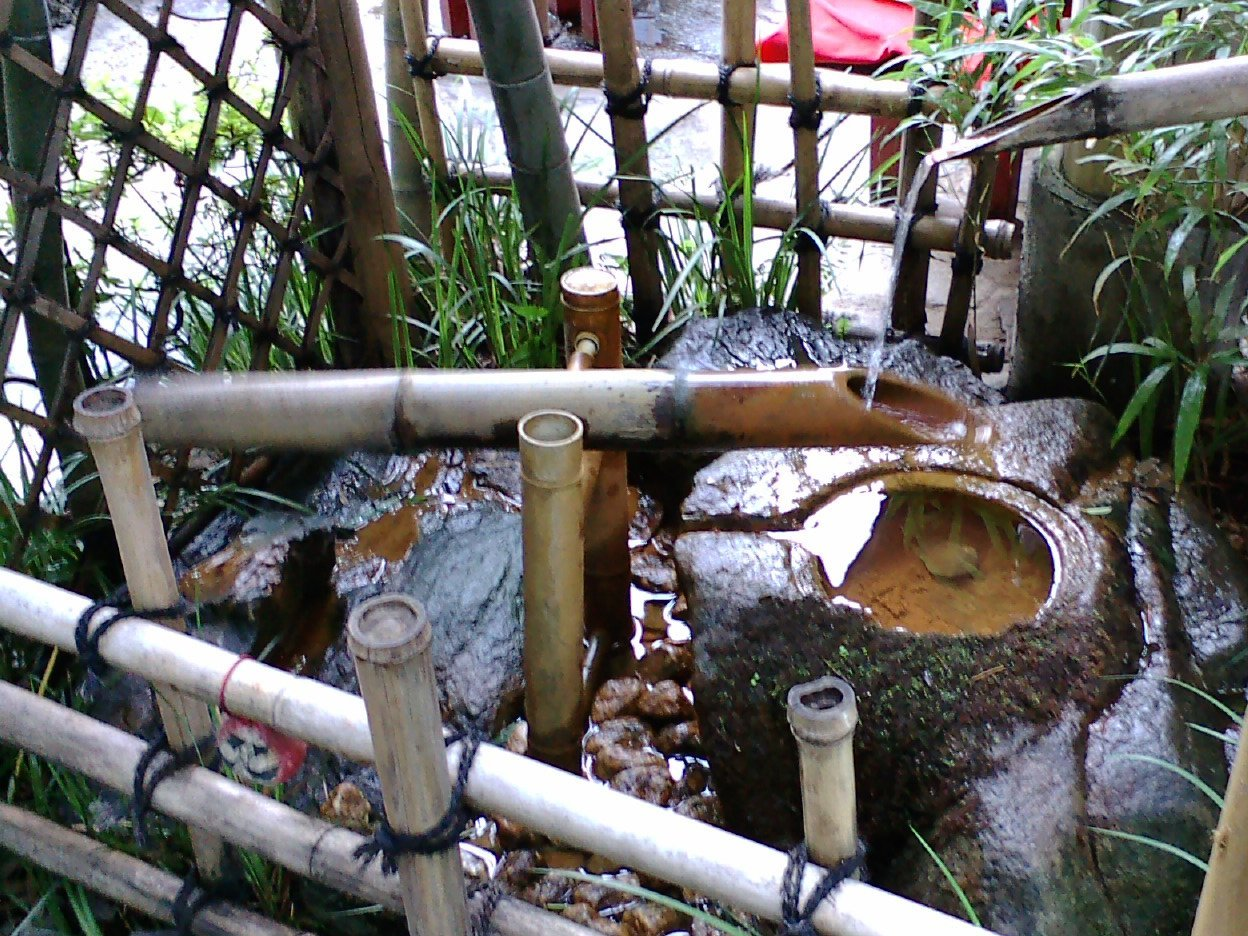
General Shishi-odoshi in Japan Gardens, in front of Japanese cuisine restaurant, Chōfu, Tokyo

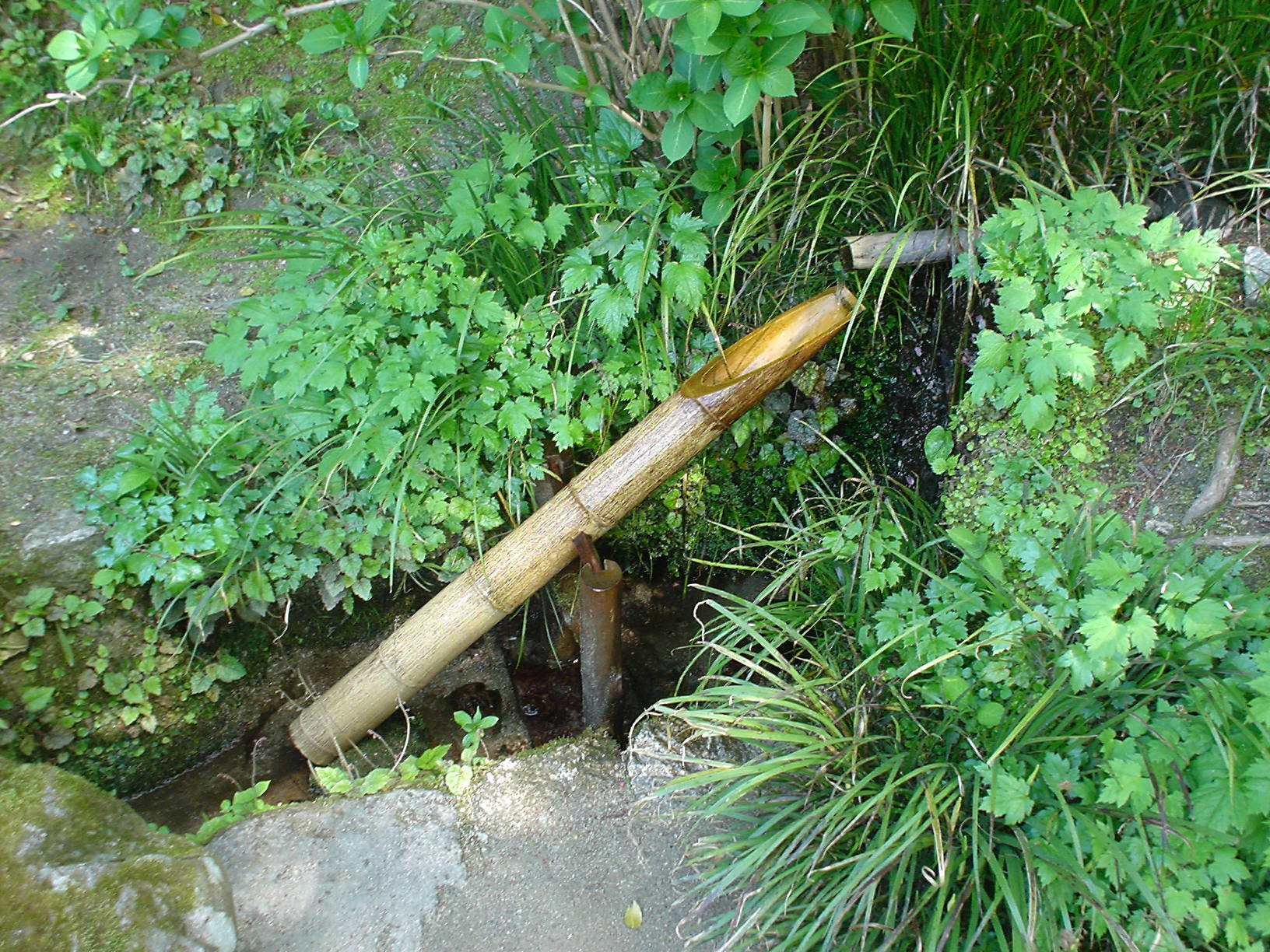
Sōzu, a kind of shishi-odoshi, at the Shisen-dō in Kyoto

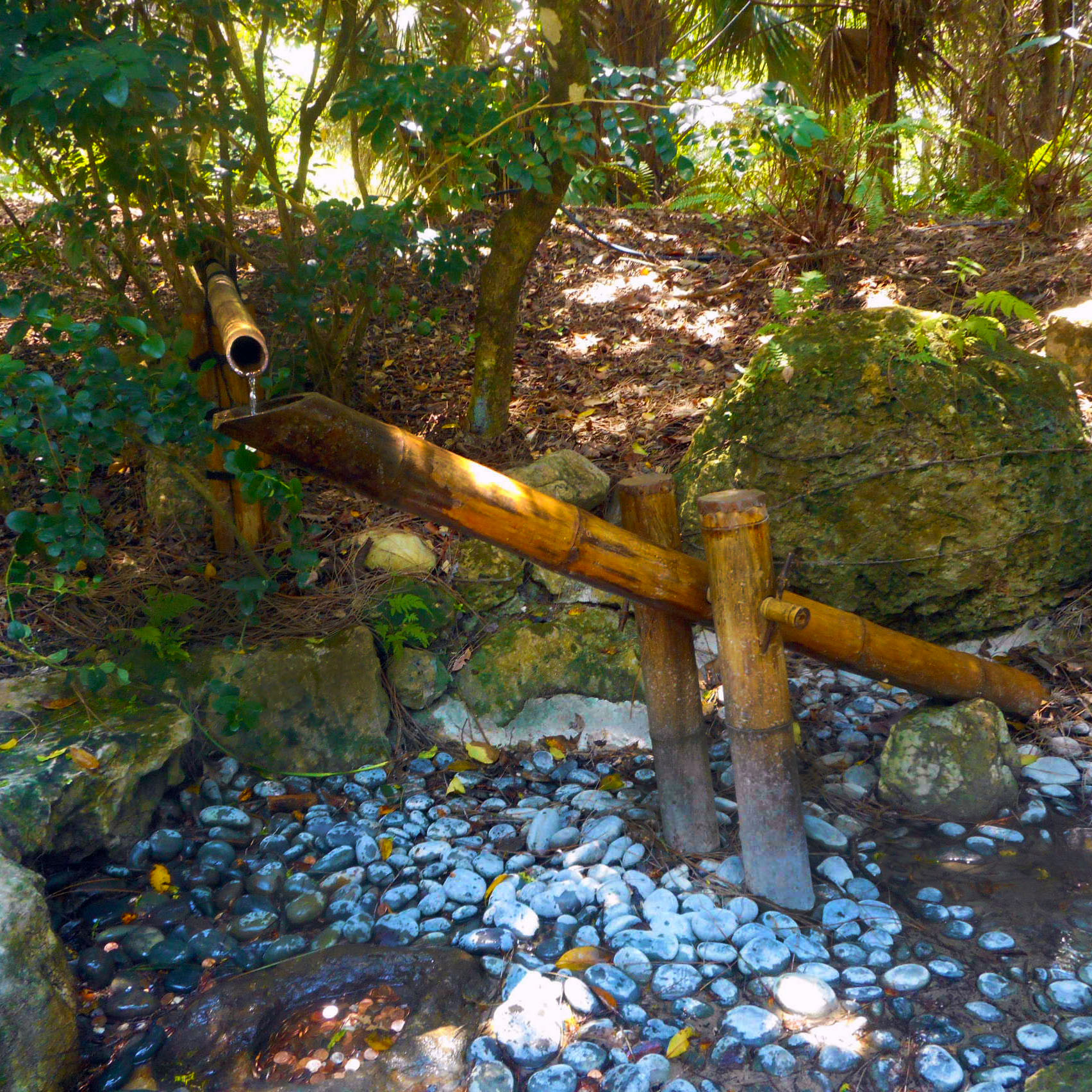
Morikami Museum and Japanese Gardens - shishi-odoshi filling up

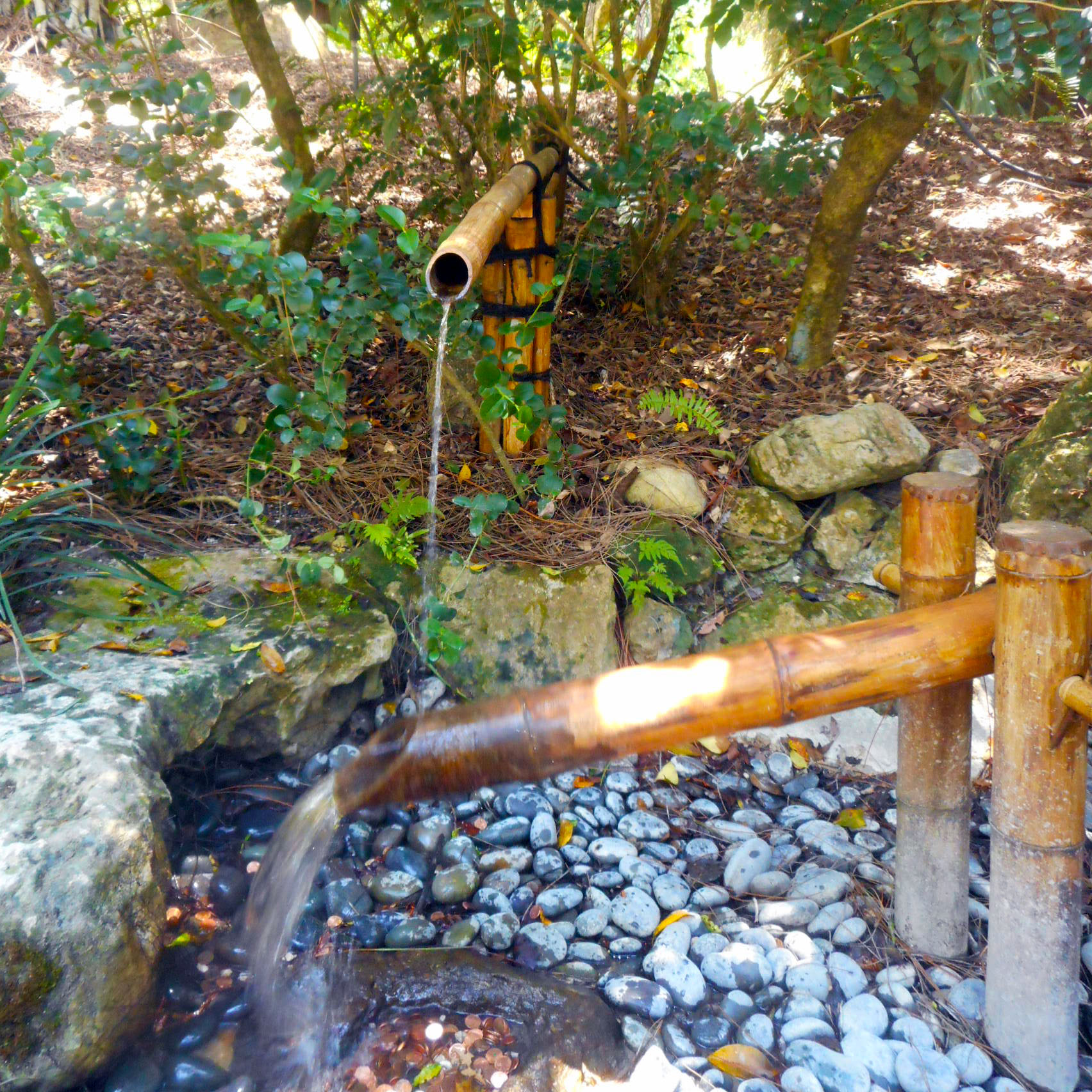
Emptying

Video of a shishi-odoshi in operation, taking one minute to fill

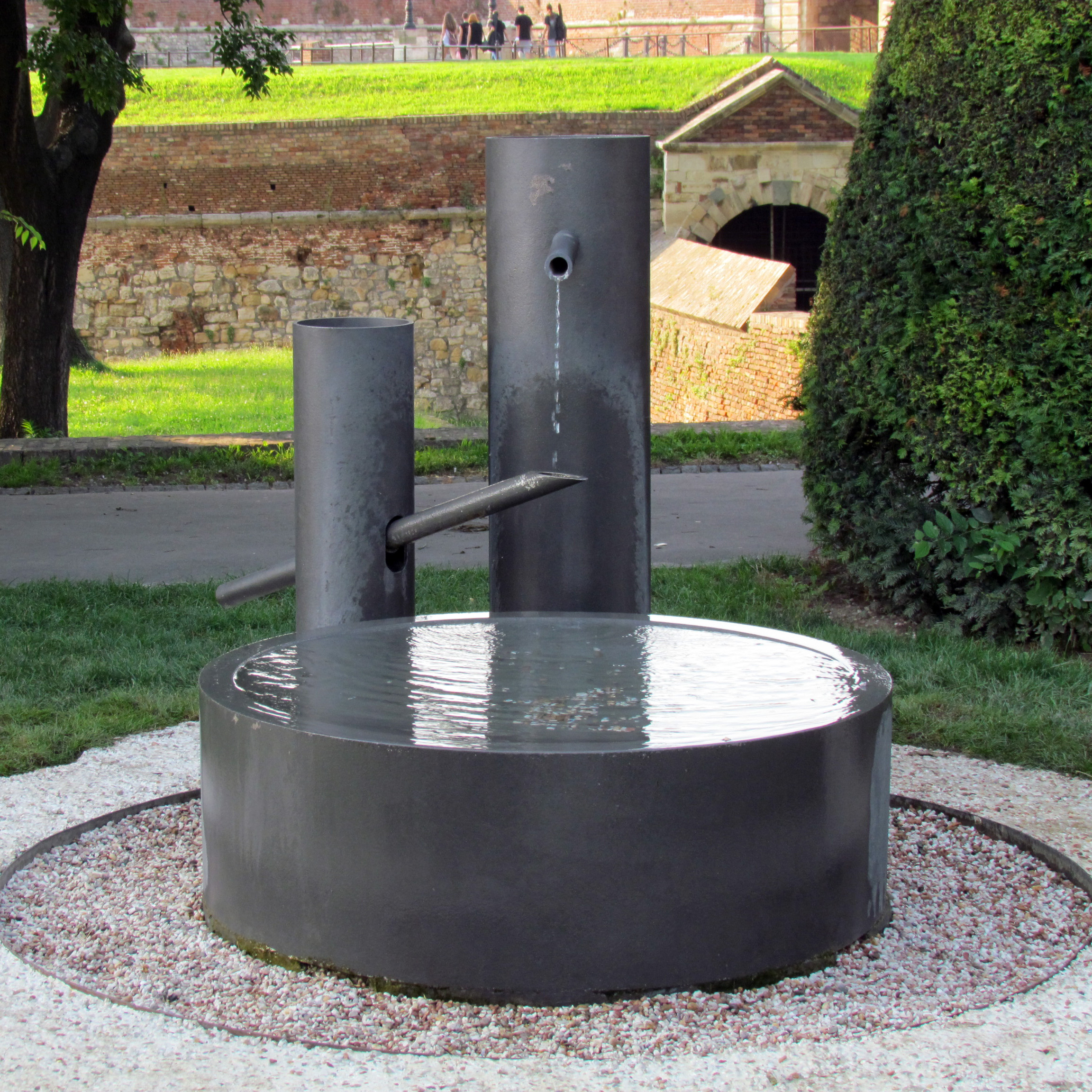
A modern, stylised shishi-odoshi in Kalemegdan Park, Belgrade

== See also ==
- Suikinkutsu
- Water scoop (hydropower)
- Tsukubai, a basin often used in conjunction
- Klopotec, another device for repelling animals
- Qiqi (tilting vessel), a Chinese cup that tips in a similar way
