= Qiqi (tilting vessel) =

Ancient Chinese ceremonial utensil

- Chinese: 欹器
- Literal meaning: inclined utensil
Transcriptions
Standard Mandarin
- Hanyu Pinyin: qīqì
- Wade–Giles: chʻi^{1}-chʻi^{4}
- IPA: [tɕʰí.tɕʰî]
Middle Chinese
- Middle Chinese: /kʰˠiᴇ.kʰˠiɪ^{H}/
Old Chinese
- Zhengzhang: /*kral.kʰrɯds/

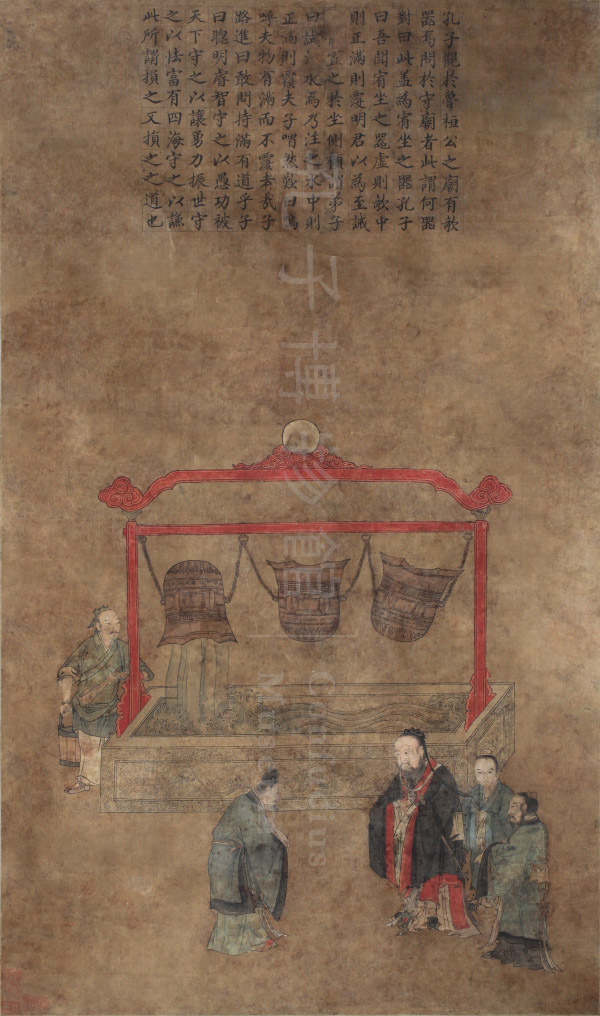
Confucius and his disciples examining a qiqi, Ming dynasty silk scroll

Operation of a qiqi tilting vessel

The qīqì (Chinese: 欹器; trans. "tilting vessel" or "tipping vessel") was an ancient Chinese ceremonial utensil that automatically overturned and spilled its contents once it reached capacity, thus symbolizing moderation and caution. Both Confucian and Daoist Chinese classics include a famous anecdote about the first time Confucius saw a tilting vessel. In the Confucian tradition (e.g., Xunzi) it was also named yòuzuò zhī qì (宥座之器; "vessel on the right of one's seat"), with three positions, the vessel tilts to one side when empty, stands upright when filled halfway, and overturns when filled to the brim—illustrating the philosophical value of the golden mean. In the Daoist tradition, the tilting vessel was named yòuzhī (宥卮; "urging goblet" or "warning goblet"), with two positions, staying upright when empty and overturning when full—illustrating the metaphysical value of emptiness, and later associated with the Zhuangzian zhīyán (卮言; "goblet words") rhetorical device.

== Terminology ==
Bronze script character for yāo (要; "waist", originally an ideograph with two hands on a 女; nǚ; "woman's" waist"), borrowed to write a homophonous word yào (要; "want").

"Phonetic loan characters", using an existing character to be read as a substitution for another of similar or identical pronunciation, have complicated interpreting several "tilting vessel" names. Prior to the Qin dynasty (221–206 BCE) when the process of standardizing Chinese characters began, scribes would use a current Chinese word and character to write another (near-)homophonous word without a standard written form, which often subsequently resulted in the creation of a new character to write the original word and meaning. For example, yāo from Old Chinese *ʔew (要; "waist" was borrowed to write yào from *ʔew-s "important; want" and the original "waist" sense was later written yāo (腰) semantically clarified with the addition of the "flesh" radical.

The word qì (器; "implement, utensil, instrument; vessel, utensil used as a container or receptacle"), is a recurrent linguistic element in Chinese names and descriptions for tilting vessels. What became the most common tipping-vessel name qīqì (欹器) is a linguistic compound with yī (欹; "exclamation of admiration"), which was a phonetic loan character for qī (攲; "slanting, canted, leaning to the side; inclined; oblique; askew; unstable, unsteady"), Both these logographs are classified as radical-phonetic characters, combining the same qí (奇; "uncommon") phonetic component with two different semantic components or radicals, called the "lack" radical (欠) and "branch" radical (支).

Another name with qì ("utensil"), yòuzuò zhī qì (宥坐之器; "vessel on the right of the seat" or "urging vessel"), is written as (宥坐之器) in the Xunzi and Kongzi jiayu, (宥座之器) in the Han shi waizhuan, or (右坐之器) in the Shuo yuan. The first word yòu (宥; "generous, indulgent, magnanimous; lenient, to pardon") was a phonetic loan character for yòu (侑; "urge to eat or drink"), yòu (右; "right, right side"), or yòu (囿; "circumscribed area; confine"). Bernhard Karlgren's classic Grammata Serica Recensa dictionary glosses yòu (宥) as "to be large-minded; to pardon; remit taxes; aid, encourage; mitigate" and yòu (侑) as "assist; encourage to drink; forgive". The second word is written with the related textual variants zuò (坐; "sit") and zuò (座; "seat"). The Wenzi has a final qi name, jiè zhī qì (戒之器; "warning vessel") using jiè (戒; "take precautions against, put on guard; warn(ing), monition").

Yòuzhī (宥卮; 侑卮; "a goblet for urging wine on a guest") is a "tilting vessel" name with zhī (卮/巵; "an ancient wine goblet") instead of qi (器), written with the yòu (宥; "lenient") loan character (Huainanzi) or yòu (侑; "urge to drink") clarification (Wenzi). Modern scholars such as D. C. Lau have connected this Daoist tilting goblet name with the zhīyán (卮言; "goblet words") rhetorical tactic found in the Zhuangzi.

== Textual versions ==
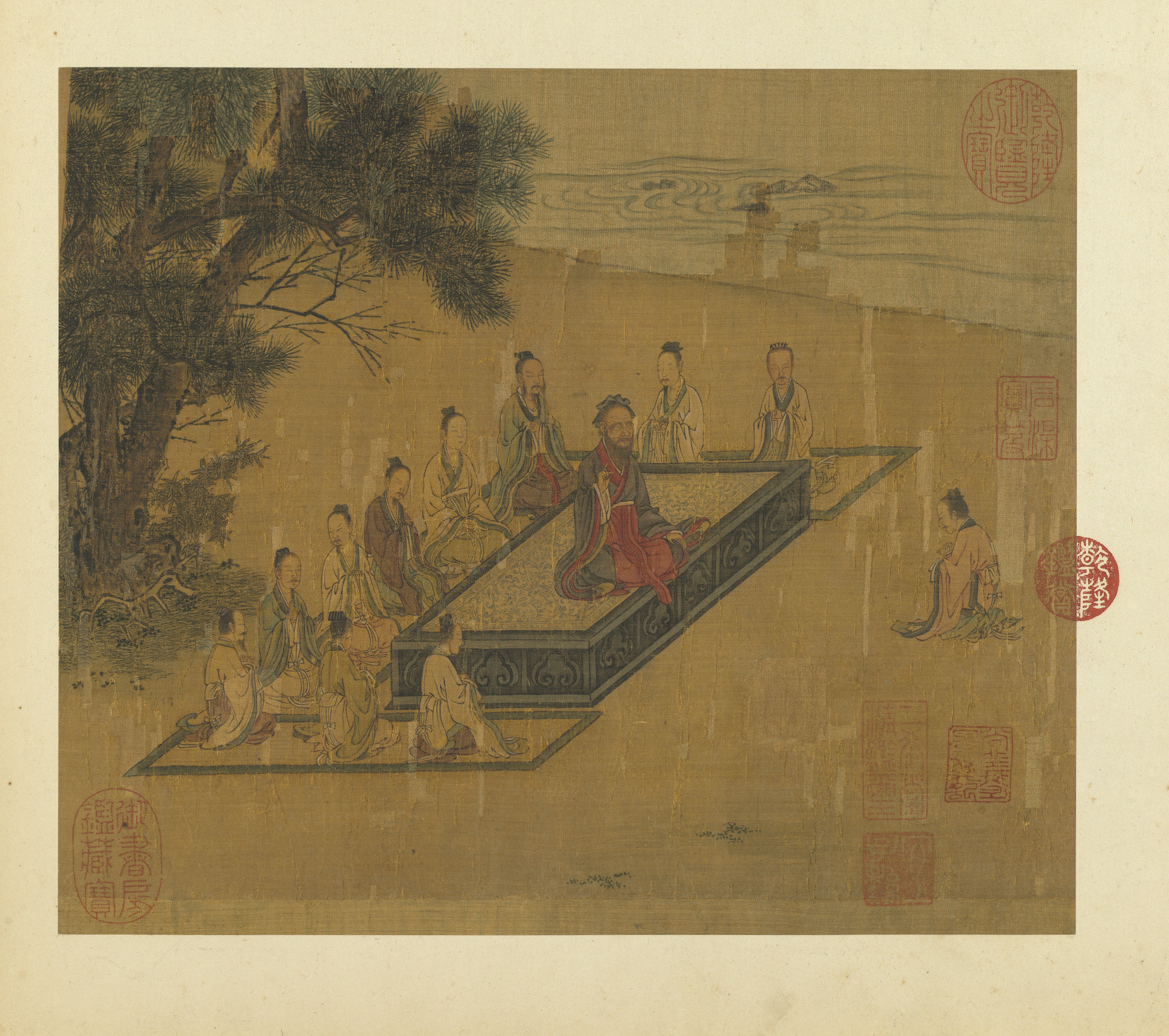
Confucius (center) and his disciples, Song dynasty silk painting

Six received texts in the Chinese classics mention tilting vessels, four Confucianist (Xunzi, Kongzi Jiayu, Han shi waizhuan, and Shuo yuan) and two Daoist (Huainanzi and Wenzi). Five of these six, excluding the Wenzi, contain an anecdote about Confucius (551–479 BCE) visiting an ancestral miào (廟; "temple; shrine") and being surprised to see an ancient tilting vessel. Since multiple pre-Han and Han texts incorporated this story, it must have been "very famous" and "widely known" during the Warring States period (475–221 BCE). Since none of these early texts gives any disclaimer regarding the tilting-vessel anecdote's historicity, we may safely assume that people two-thousand years ago believed that Confucius’ temple visit had taken place as described.

In brief, Confucius and his disciples visit a temple with a ritual tilting vessel, Confucius asks the caretaker about its name, says what he has heard about the vessel having three positions, which is confirmed when they pour water into it, then the disciple Zilu (in the four Confucian versions or Zigong in a Daoist version) asks a question about how to keep the tilting vessel full, to which Confucius replies with a list of four to six (depending on the text) positive attributes that should be shǒu (守; "guarded; maintained; protected") by means of its negative attribute, e.g., "Keen intelligence and sagely wisdom should be guarded by feigning stupidity".

Kramers notes this story has a "great affinity" to Daoist ideas and says that in general, the Xunzi and Kongzi Jiayu are closely parallel, the Han shi waizhuan and Shuo yuan present a slightly different version, while the Huainanzi and Wenzi resemble each other in yet another version. To illustrate the types of differences in wording, all five versions begin with Kongzi guan (孔子觀; "Confucius was viewing") with three variations of the temple name. The Han shi waizhuan and Shuo yuan say Zhou dynasty (周, c. 1046–256 BCE), the Xunzi and Kongzi jiayu specify Duke Huan of Lu (魯桓公, r. 711–694 BCE), and the Huainanazi simply says the ancestral temple of Duke Huan (桓公), presumably of Confucius' home state Lu, rather than Duke Huan of Zheng (鄭桓公, r. 806–771 BCE) or Duke Huan of Qi (齊桓公, r. 685–643 BCE).

Tilting-vessel accounts in the four Confucian texts are very similar, such as using the hapax legomenon shǒu miào zhě (守廟者; "temple caretaker") that is only recorded in these contexts. Note that the 1st century BCE Shuo Yuan is omitted from the following discussion because no published English translation is available.

=== Xunzi ===
The Xunzi ("[Writings of] Master Xun"), a collection of philosophical treatises attributed to Xun Kuang (c. 310 – c. 235 BCE), has a section titled Youzuo (宥坐; "The Warning Vessel on the Right"), and its version of the tilting vessel anecdote uses the terms qīqì (欹器) and yòuzuò zhī qì (宥坐之器).

Confucius looked into the ancestral shrine of Duke Huan of Lu, and there was a tipping-vessel there, and Confucius asked of the shrine steward, "What is this vessel?" The steward answered, "This is a 'Vessel to Assist the Throne.'" Confucius said, "I have heard that 'Vessels to Assist the Throne' slant when they are empty, stand upright when half-full, and tip over when full. [中而正, 滿而覆, 虛而欹]" Confucius looked at it and said to his disciples, "Pour water into it." So his disciples brought water and poured it in: it stood upright when half-full, tipped over when full, and then slanted when empty. Confucius heaved a long sigh, and said, "Oh! How could there be that which is full and does not tip over?" Zilu said, "May I ask, is there a Way of maintaining fullness? [持滿有道]" Confucius said, "Perceptiveness and sagely knowledge is to be kept by foolishness, a worldwide achievement is to be kept by yielding, bravery in protecting the world is to be kept by cowardice, the prosperity of the globe is to be kept by modesty, and this is what is called the "Way of Bringing through Losing." [此所謂挹而損之之道也]. (24)

Joseph Needham translates, "This is the Advisory Vessel which stands at the right hand side of the throne", and describes this "famous hydrostatic 'trick' vessel" as a remarkable application of knowledge about centers of gravity. Another translation of this Xunzi passage renders the names as "a vessel that inclined to one side" and "a warning vessel".

=== Kongzi jiayu ===
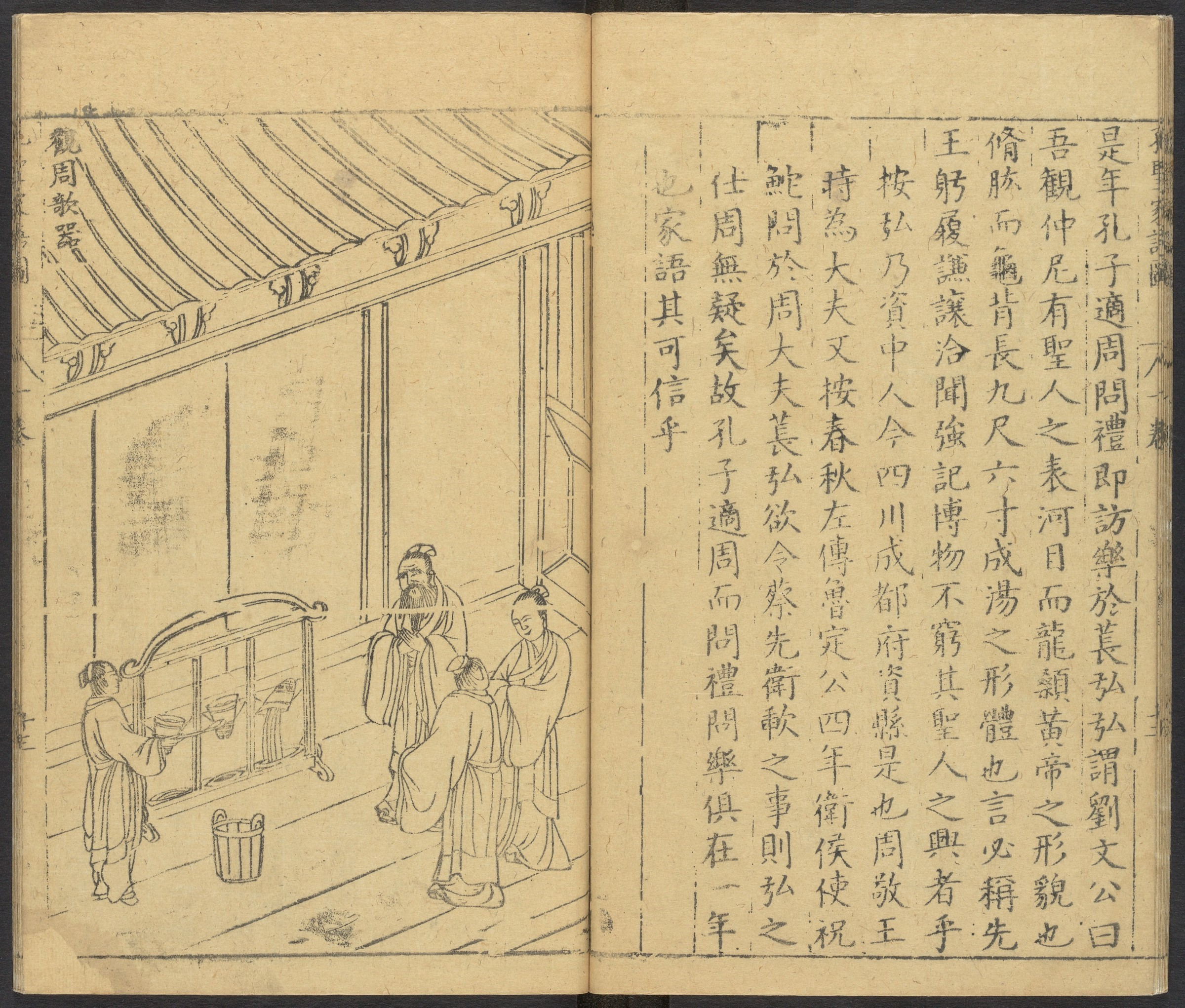
Confucius and his disciples examining a qiqi, Kongzi jiayu illustrated edition, 1589, Ming dynasty

The Kongzi Jiayu ("The School Sayings of Confucius") is a collection of ancient pre-Han traditions about Confucius, yet the received text contains some spurious passages apparently interpolated by Wang Su (195–256 CE). Although later scholars dismissed the Kongzi jiayu as a forgery, archeological discoveries in the 1970s revealed fragmentary copies of the book written on bamboo strips in Western Han tombs dating from 165 and 55 BCE.

This version of the story uses qīqì (欹器; "slanting vessel") and yòuzuò zhī qì (宥座之器; "seat-companion vessel").

Confucius inspected the ancestral temple of Duke Huan of Lu. There was a slanting vessel in it. Confucius asked the temple-warden: "What vessel is this?" He answered, saying: "This must be the seat-companion vessel". Confucius said: "I have heard that the seat-companion vessel slants when empty, stands straight when half filled and overturns when full to the brim. The enlightened rulers considered it a serious warning and therefore they constantly placed it beside their seats". Looking back he said to a disciple: "Try and pour water into it". So they poured water into it: when half filled it stood straight, when full to the brim it overturned [中則正, 滿則覆]. The Master sighed deeply and said: "Alas! Would there be anything which would not overturn when full to the brim?" Tzu-lu came forward and said: "May I ask if there is a way to keep it filled to the brim? [持滿有道]" The Master said: "Intelligence penetrating [all] wisdom is restrained by stupidity. Meritorious deeds covering the whole world are restrained by the [quality of] giving way. Courage and force shaking the age are restrained by fear. Riches [extending to] the possession of all within the four seas are restrained by modesty. This is what is called the way of "decreasing and again decreasing [損之又損之之道]".

=== Han shi waizhuan ===
The c. 150 BCE Han shi waizhuan ("Han School Commentary to the Classic of Poetry", named after Han Ying 韓嬰, c. 200 – c. 120 BCE), version of the tilting vessel anecdote uses the names qīqì (欹器) and yòuzuò zhī qì (宥座之器), and adds a quote from the Classic of Poetry (304). The Hanshi waizhuan commentary by Yang Liang (楊倞, fl. 818) glosses yòu (宥; "forgive") as yòu (右; "right; to assist" [佑]"), meaning "a ruler should put it to the right of his seat as a warning", while others gloss it as yòu (侑; "urge a guest to drink").

Confucius paid a visit to the ancestral temple of Chou, where they had a vessel that leaned at an angle. Confucius asked the caretaker of the temple, "What vessel is that?" The caretaker replied, "Why that, I believe, is a Warning Vessel." Confucius said, "I have heard that a Warning Vessel, when full, turns over, when empty it leans at an angle, and when half full it stands straight. Is this true?" "It is." Confucius had Tzŭ-lu bring water to try it. Full, it turned over; half full, it stood straight; empty, it leaned at an angle [滿則覆, 中則正, 虛則欹]. Confucius heaved a sigh and said, "Ah, does it ever happen that those who are full do not turn over!" Tzŭ-lu said, "I should like to ask whether there is a method for controlling fullness? [持滿有道]" Confucius said, "The method of controlling fullness is to repress and diminish it [抑而損之]." Tzŭ-lu said, "Is there a method for diminishing it?" Confucius said, "Let those whose virtuous conduct is ample preserve it by being reverent. Let those whose territory is extensive preserve it by economy. Let those whose pay is rich and whose rank is elevated preserve them by humility. Let those whose people are many and whose weapons are strong preserve them by fear. Let those possessed of intelligence and knowledge preserve them through [an air of] stupidity. Let those with great learning and strong memories preserve them through [an air of] shallowness. Now this is what I mean by repressing and diminishing [抑而損之]." The Ode says, T'ang was not born too late, and his wisdom and virtue daily advanced".

Legge translates this passage with "vessel [which was hanging] unevenly [in a frame]" and imprecisely "vessel of the festive board", which refers to the Masonic lodge "festive board" formal dinner involving toasting and singing.

This Xunzi passage was the source for the Han shi waizhuan and Shuo yuan versions with graphic variants not found in other texts, while the Kongzi jiayu copied Xunzi with only minor variations.

=== Huainanzi ===
The c. 139 BCE Huainanzi ("[Writings of] the Huainan Masters") is a collection of essays by scholars in the court of Liu An, Prince of Huainan. It quotes from many pre-Han schools of thought, including Huang–Lao Daoism, Confucianism, and Legalism.

This Daoist version of the anecdote differs from the Confucian ones in several respects. While the Confucian texts give the three-position vessel description twice, when it is first seen and after the water pouring experiment, the Huainanzi only gives the two-position description it in the second context. The questioning disciple is identified as Zigong instead of Zilu. This textual version adds two quotes not found in the other versions. It quotes Confucius that "Things prosper then decline ..." referring to the sun and moon, and quotes Laozi (Daodejing 15).

Master Kong was paying a visit to the temple of Duke Huan when he happened to catch sight of a vessel called a Warning Vessel. "How wonderful to have caught sight of such a vessel!" "Master Kong exclaimed in delight. He turned his head around toward his disciples and called out: "Disciples, fetch some water!" When they brought the water, Master Kong poured it into the vessel. When the vessel was half full, it remained upright, but when Master Kong filled it completely, it toppled over on its side [其中則正, 其盈則覆]. Suddenly Master Kong's expression changed, and he exclaimed: "How splendid to grasp the significance of fullness [持盈; chíyíng]." Standing at the master's side, Zigong said: "Please, what does it mean 'to grasp the significance of fullness'? "What increases will decrease," replied Master Kong. "What does that mean?" asked Zigong. Master Kong replied: "Things prosper then decline. Joy reaches its utmost then becomes sorrow. The sun reaches its apogee then shifts. The moon reaches its fullness then begins to wane. This is why the perceptive and wise preserve themselves with stupidity; the learned and eloquent preserve themselves with restraint; the martial and courageous preserve themselves with timidity; the wealthy and powerful preserve themselves with frugality; and those whose Potency operates throughout the world preserve themselves with docility. These five things are the means by which the former kings defended their empires without losing them. If you oppose these five things, you will always be endangered." Therefore the Laozi says: "If you submit to the Way, you will not want to be full. It is because he is not full that he can be worn and yet newly made" (12.55).

=== Wenzi ===
The pre-2nd century BCE Wenzi ("[Writings of] Master Wen") version of the tilting-vessel story uses the unique terms jiè zhī qì (戒之器; "warning vessel") and yòuzhī (侑卮; "urging goblet"). Instead of associating tilting vessels with Duke Huan of Lu, this version instead names the Three Sovereigns and Five Emperors, a collective name for legendary Chinese sage-rulers,

The tilting vessel context discusses the importance of fǎn (反; "reversal; returning") within the Daoist Tiāndào (天道; "Way of Heaven"), with examples of the sun and moon increasing and decreasing. "The ancient monarchs had a warning-vessel, called an 'urging goblet.' This righted itself when poured out, and turned over when filled [其沖即正，其盈即覆]."

== History ==
Chinese histories record that the tipping-vessel was an exclusively elite object that finally disappeared during the turbulent end of the Han dynasty (189–220). Details about the last authentic Zhou dynasty tipping vessel are found in the Book of Jin biography of general Du Yu, which recounts that around 260 CE he attempted to reconstruct a qiqi but had difficulties: "The tipping-vessel of the Zhou ancestral shrine was still by the throne when the Han came to the Eastern Capital. In the chaos at the end of the Han, it was kept no longer, and [knowledge of the] form and construction were lost." The Book of Sui records that the mathematician Liu Hui (c. 225 – c. 295) wrote a Lu shi qiqi tu (鲁史欹器圖; "Diagrams of the Inclining Vessels of the Lu Officials"). Later dynastic histories similarly record attempts to recreate the ancient vessels. According to the History of the Southern Dynasties, the mathematician and inventor Zu Chongzhi successfully reconstructed a qiqi vessel during the reign-period of Yongming (483–493). The astronomer and mathematician Zu Chongzhi (429–500) made more tilting vessels. Xue Cheng (薛程) made elaborate ones in 538, and the engineer Geng Xun (耿詢) also made them in 605. Around 790 Li Gao (李皋, 733–792), the Tang Prince of Cao, produced numerous lacquerware tipping vessels. The latest tipping-vessel example is when the Guangxu Emperor had one manufactured 1889, and that artifact is now at the Palace Museum in Beijing.

During the Abbasid Caliphate, tilting vessels "aroused the keen interest" of Persian scholars, who "greatly developed their possibilities", as seen in Banu Musa's 850 Book of Ingenious Devices, which described many types of automata, such as valves that open and close by themselves.

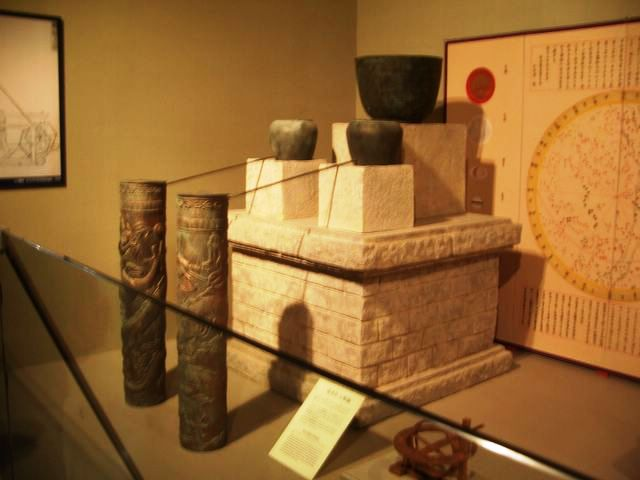
A recreated model of Chang Yŏngsil's automated water clock.

The Chinese qiqi (欹器; "tipping vessel") was adapted for a technologically sophisticated Korean water clock during the Joseon dynasty (1392–1897). King Sejong the Great (r. 1418–1450) ordered the inventor Chang Yŏngsil to develop two automated water clocks. The 1434 Borugak-nu (報漏閣漏) was the national standard clock in the Gyeongbokgung Palace. The 1438 Heumgyeonggak-nu (欽敬閣漏) was an astronomical clock that displayed the movements of celestial bodies and changes of seasons with both visual and audible time signals. It had an overflow tube that transferred surplus water to a miniature waterfall, pond, and tilting vessel.

== Modern interpretations ==
The sinologist and translator D. C. Lau analyzed all six versions of the tilting-vessel story, and found that the descriptions of whether the container had two or three positions provided a historical key for the direction of borrowing. Five texts describe a zhōng (中; "middle" interpreted as "half full") position, but the Wenzi graphic variant of chōng (沖; "pour out; empty") with the "water radical" provides a better interpretation.

Three Confucian texts record that the vessel had three positions, xū (虛; "empty"), zhōng (中; "middle; half full"), and mǎn (滿; "full"). The Han Shi waizhuan and Shuo yuan say: "Full, it turned over; half full, it stood straight; empty, it tilted" (滿則覆, 中則正, 虛則欹), while the Xunzi reversed the order to describe filling the vessel: "Empty, it tilted; half full, it stood straight; full, it turned over" (虛則欹, 中則正, 滿則覆). The other three texts record two positions. The Confucian Kongzi jiayu text says: "Half full, it stood straight; full, it turned over" (中則正, 滿則覆). Both Daoist textual versions also record two, but add the pronoun qí (其; "he; she; it") and use the synonym yíng (盈; "full") for mǎn (滿; "full"). There was a naming taboo on writing the given name Ying of Emperor Hui of Han (r. 195–188 BCE). The Huainanzi says: "When it was half full, it remained upright; when it was full, it turned over" (其中則正, 其盈則覆). The Wenzi variant chōng (沖; "empty") changes our understanding: "When it was empty, it remained upright, when it was full, it turned over" (其沖即正, 其盈即覆). Thus, instead of literally reading the zhōng (中; "middle") position as "half full", it can be read as a phonetic loan character for chōng (沖; "empty").

Lau differentiates the Daoist and Confucian versions of the tilting-vessel anecdote. In the simpler Daoist two-position version, the legendary vessel is upright when "empty" (沖 or 中) and overturns when "full" (滿 or 盈). This was "ingeniously changed" in the Confucian three-position version that takes zhōng (中; "middle"), which was a loan for chōng (沖; "empty"), in its literal sense and changes the meaning of the passage "When empty, it was upright, when full, it overturned" to "When half full (中), it was upright; when full (滿), it overturned", allowing the insertion of a third sentence "when empty (虛), it tilted", using the qī in qīqì (欹器; "tilting vessel"). In this way, not only was the Daoist ideal of emptiness transformed into the Confucian advocacy of moderation, but the added statement further reduced emptiness from being the supreme Daoist virtue to being merely one of two extremes.

Additional evidence for Lau's hypothesis comes from Zhuangzi commentaries about zhīyán (卮言 / 巵言) goblet words that describe a zhi (巵) goblet as a wine vessel that tilts over when full and rights itself when empty, presumably referring to a qīqì (欹器; "tilting vessel"). The commentary of Guo Xiang (252–312 CE) says, "A [zhi] (wine cup), when full, overturns, and when empty, faces upwards" (夫巵滿則傾, 巵空則仰). Lu Deming (c. 556–630), author of the Jingdian Shiwen, comments "A [zhi] vessel, when full, overturns and, when empty, faces upwards. It adapts itself to things and is not something which holds rigidly to one thing and abides by what happened in the past." The first part of Guo's commentary is almost identical with the Huainanzi version, and Lau notes two points. Both sources describe a vessel with only two positions: it overturns when full and faces upwards when empty. Guo Xiang unambiguously describes it with the word kōng (空; "empty"), which, unlike zhōng (中; "middle"), is not open to "deliberate misinterpretation". Lau's "important" article convincingly shows that Guo Xiang used the Daoist version of the tipping vessel story.

In Lau's interpretation, the Daoist version of the story neither mentions a third half-fuIl position of the vessel, nor mentions the word qī (欹; "tilt") either. This accounts for the fact that it is only in the Confucian version that the vessel is known as the qīqì (欹器; "tilting vessel"), while the Huainanzi simply calls it qì (器; "vessel") and the Wenzi calls it jiè zhī qì (戒之器; "cautionary vessel"). Having inserted the sentence "when it was empty it tilted", the Confucian editor clinched the matter by calling it the "tilting vessel". In the Daoist version, the vessel is upright when empty and overturns when full, thus illustrating the value of emptiness. In the Confucian version, this was changed so that the vessel is upright when half full, overturns when full, and tilts when empty, thus illustrating the value of the mean. The Daoist version called the tilting-vessel yòuzhī (宥卮; "goblet for encouraging a guest to drink wine") and this was changed to yòuzuò zhī qì (宥座之器; "vessel placed on the right of one's seat") in the Confucian one.

The Huainanzi uses the word chíyíng (持盈) while the four Confucian texts use chiman (持滿) in accordance with the imperial naming taboo. In the Daoist version, the term chíyíng (持盈) meant "to fill by holding", e.g., the Huainanzi describes "to grasp the significance of fullness". For the Confucians, their own term chiman (持滿)) meant "to maintain a state of fullness", the Han shi waizhuan describes a "method for controlling fullness" (持滿有道). The meaning of 持盈 is explained in the Daoist version by the sentence 益而損之 ("What increases will decrease") (Huainanzi). This was changed into 抑而損之 (Han shi waizhuan; "The method of controlling fullness is to repress and diminish it"), which describes the way to attain qiying in the Confucian sense. The Xunzi and Shuo yuan write 挹而損之 with yì (挹; "draw from; decant") instead of yì (抑; "repress; restrain"), "Way of Bringing through Losing". The expression 益而損之 is further explained in the Daoist version by the passage in which the general principle is stated that things when they reach the highest point of development will decline. This was changed by the substitution of a passage which states the principle derived from the Book of Changes that fullness can be maintained by guarding a positive attribute by means of its negative attribute. Lau concludes that the tilting vessel anecdote is an insightful example of how "a story which belonged originally to a particular school can come to be adopted, with modifications, by another".

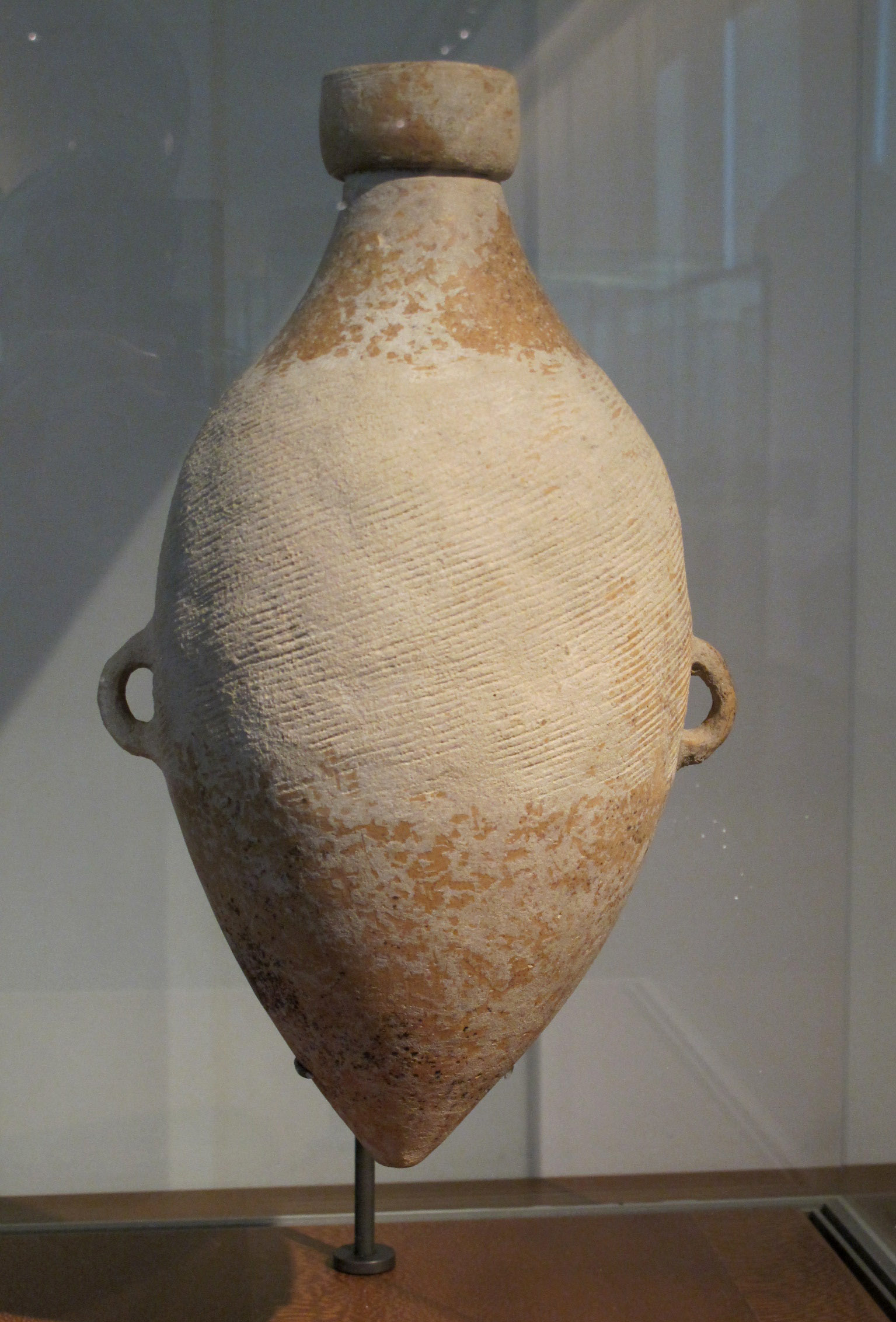
Yangshao cord-marked amphora with carrying handles, Banpo Phase, c. 4800 BCE, Shaanxi.

Shang dynasty oracle bone script for yǒu (酉 / 酒; "wine jug; wine"), c. 1250–1046 BCE

Daniel Fried, professor of Chinese and comparative literature at the University of Alberta, combined Chinese textual and archeological evidence to propose a "speculative history" of the Zhuangzian zhī "goblet" trope, associating it with the Zhou dynasty (c. 1046–256 BCE) qīqí (欹器; "tipping vessel") designed to tilt and empty when filled to capacity, and ultimately with a Yangshao culture (c. 5000 – c. 4000 BCE) irrigation vessel that would tip over automatically. The Leiden University scholar Paul van Els describes Fried's paper as "an insightful discussion of the vessel's various uses, with illustrations of the object". This hypothesis has three diachronic stages: agricultural-"zhi", tipping-zhi, and jade-zhi.

The first agricultural-"zhi" period began when ancient farmers in late Neolithic China developed an irrigation tool (the prehistoric name of this device is unknown, and Fried extends "zhi" emblematically) that used ropes and ceramic amphora with handles below the center of gravity. It facilitated evenly irrigating large fields, and proved so useful that it continued to be used for thousands of years. In the 1950s, Chinese archeologists excavating the Banpo site in Shaanxi discovered narrow-mouthed, narrow-bottomed amphora jugs dating from the Yangshao culture (c. 5000 – c. 3000 BCE). Zhang Ling first identified this particular shape of narrow-bottomed jug as the referent in both the Xunzi passage on the qiqi and the Guo Xiang commentary on the zhi. Huang Chongyue (黄崇岳) and Sun Xiao (孫霄), researchers at the Banpo Museum, published a series of articles based on experiments with the amphoras. Their unusually high center of gravity relative to the handles will cause the jars to display the properties of the tipping-vessel as described in the Xunzi, namely, that it "slants when empty, stands upright when half-full, and tips over when full". The use of the vessel in irrigation "was driven by its ability to deliver a constant, low-flow stream of water, without the attention of the farmer, who held strings attached to the handles while the jugs tipped over of themselves". Fried speculates that advances in agricultural technology, such as the introduction of the water-raising well-sweep into China around the 5th century BCE, may have caused farmers to discontinue using the ceramic tipping-vessels for irrigation.

In the second hypothetical stage of the tipping-zhi or qiqi is substantiated by early Chinese texts. Rulers adopted the intriguing irrigation device for its symbolic meaning that warned against excess. By the late Warring States period (c. 475–221 BCE), this seemingly "automated" tilting vessel was credited with enough cultural significance, or at least "value as a curiosity", to be displayed in the ancestral shrine of Duke Huan of Lu (d. 694 BCE), which seemed plausible to the redactors of both Daoist and Confucian classics. Although Confucius (d. 479 BCE) had previously heard of the tipping-zhi, he had never seen one until visiting Huan's shrine, which implies that they had not been in common use for centuries during the Eastern Zhou period. This point is confirmed by the youzhi (侑卮; "urging goblet") that the Wenzi version describes as a possession of the mythological kings, indicating that Duke Huan was not considered ancient enough to be associated with the uncommon tipping-zhi. Around the time when popular usage of the tipping-zhi was dying out, Zhuangzi (d. c. 286) metaphorically described his own style of speech with zhi signifying both instability and timelessness.

Fried's third stage of jade-zhi was first recorded in late Western Han texts that described valuable yùzhī (玉卮; "jade goblets"). Sima Qian's c. 91 BCE Records of the Grand Historian usually mentioned them in contexts of highly formal occasions, often in conjunction with toasts for longevity or ritual dedications. For instance, the history of Xiang Yu (232–202 BCE) says, "The Earl of Xiang went in to see the Duke of Pei. The Duke of Pei raised a goblet of wine to his health, and proposed a marriage [between their houses]." Or, the history of Emperor Gaozu (r. 202–195 BCE) says, "When the Weiyang Palace was completed, Emperor Gaozu assembled the nobles and ministers, and had wine set out in the Anterior Hall of the Weiyang Palace. Then Gaozu raised a jade goblet, and toasted the health of the Taishang Huang (his father Liu Taigong)." In later Chinese literature, the word zhi continued to have a decorous, high-class connotation, regularly in connection with toasts for long life. For example, the Tang poet Zhang Ji wrote, "I place a jade goblet full of wine and, bowing, wish you immortality".

In the context of Du Yu's frustrating attempt to reconstruct a zhi tipping vessel without a working model, the Book of Jin says the last surviving one was lost by the end of the Han in 220 CE, and it was exclusively a royal regalia by that point. If it had been regularly used, "its form would have been common knowledge, and hence not susceptible to sudden loss". After the zhi's original cultural memory was forgotten, the only physical objects still known as zhi were jade goblets, and readers from this point on could only think of such valuable cups when reading the Zhuangzi. The biggest problem with this upper-class connotation of jade-zhi goblets frequently used in toasts for longevity is that it appears incompatible with the Zhuangzi description of zhiyan. "Goblet words come forth daily," but the jade-zhi of the mainstream tradition is not a container for daily use, it is a special goblet for elite usage on ceremonial occasions.

Fried does not cite Lau who studied all known versions of the anecdote about the tipping vessel in Duke Huan's shrine, and dichotomized between earlier Daoist two-position versions and later Confucian three-position versions. Focusing on the Xunzi and Wenzi anecdotes, Fried briefly refers to the Huainanzi, but mentions neither the Kongzi jiayu nor Han shi waizhuan versions. He presumes that both Guo Xiang and the Wenzi redactor changed the original Xunzi formulation describing a three-position vessel (upright, inclining, or flipped) and edited it to describe a two-position one (self-righting or self-tipping). For the "most difficult to understand" phrase in the Xunzi description, "it is upright when half-full" (中而正; zhong er zheng), Guo simply eliminated it from his zhi commentary, and the Wenzi redactor assumed a loan-character substitution, meaning that the vessel "pours out and is righted" (沖即正; chong ze zheng). Fried describes this as the sort of editing that one would make when no more such vessels are known through experience, and the interpreter is "attempting to deal with a received formulation".

Van Els disagrees with Lau's hypothesis that the Daoist version (e.g. Huainanzi) was the original anecdote, which was borrowed into Confucian writings (e.g. Han shi waizhuan) and transformed to suit their teachings. Lau sees a significant inconsistency in the Confucian versions that promote techniques for maintaining complete fullness, whereas the vessel's overflowing serves to illustrate that fullness cannot be maintained. Van Els sees it differently. The Huainanzi version of the anecdote mentions only two stages of the vessel (half full and full). Since logically speaking, filling a vessel involves three stages (empty, full, and anything in between), one would therefore reasonably expect the story to include the empty stage. He argues that the Huainanzi text, which lauds the Daoist philosophical concept of xū (虛; "emptiness; vacuity"), is inconsistent by praising the extraordinary object but failing to mention its essential characteristic, namely that it leans to the side when empty. In the Han shi waizhuan, Confucius suggests that complete fullness leads to overturning, and when asked if there is a way to maintain complete fullness, says yes and explains how. Van Els judges this version as consistent, and finds it more likely that the story circulated in a Confucian context and was later adapted and modified in the Huainanzi.

== See also ==
- Shishi-odoshi – part of a Japanese fountain that tips in a similar way
- Pythagorean cup – a prank cup that empties its contents when overfilled
