= Zuowang =

Daoist meditation technique

- Chinese: 坐忘
- Literal meaning: sitting forgetting
Transcriptions
Standard Mandarin
- Hanyu Pinyin: zuòwàng
- Wade–Giles: tso-wang

Zuowang (Chinese: 坐忘; pinyin: zuòwàng) is a classic Daoist meditation technique, described as "a state of deep trance or intense absorption, during which no trace of ego-identity is felt and only the underlying cosmic current of the Dao is perceived as real." According to Louis Komjathy, this is one term for Daoist apophatic meditation, which also goes by various other names in Daoist literature, such as "quiet sitting" (靜坐; jìngzuò), "guarding the one" (守一; shǒuyī), "fasting the heartmind" (心齋; xīnzhāi), and "being with simplicity or sitting with oblivion" (抱朴; bàopǔ).

Zuowang instructions can be seen in classic Taoist texts from as early as the Chinese Warring States Period, such as the Zhuangzi. The term also appears in the title of an influential manual from the Tang dynasty (618–907), the Zuowanglun, and continues to inform Daoist contemplative practice today.

== Terminology ==
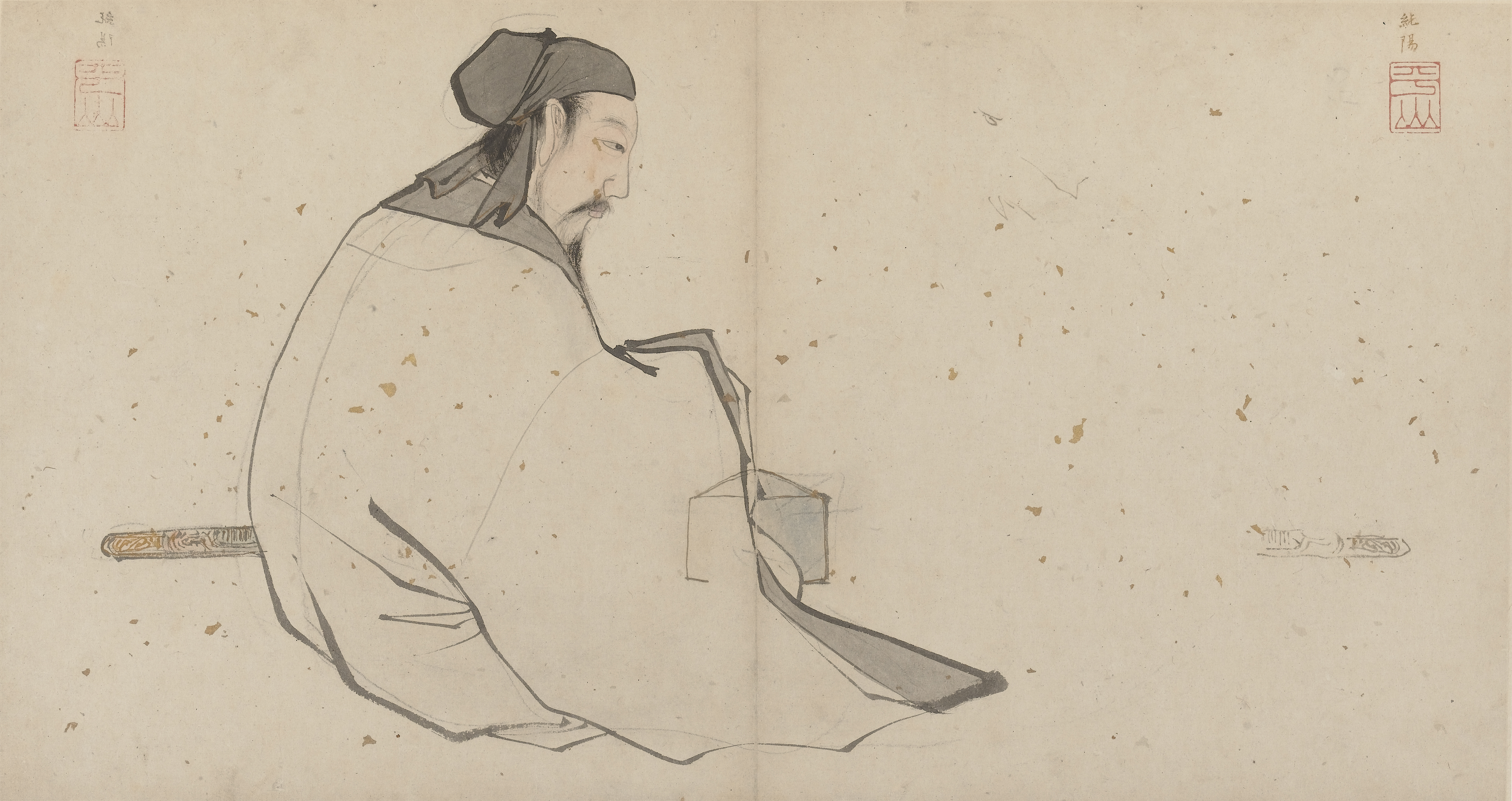
Zhang Lu's painting of a sitting Lü Dongbin, early 16th century

Chinese zuòwàng compounds the words zuò (坐; "sit; take a seat") and wàng (忘; "forget; overlook; neglect").

In terms of Chinese character classification, this zuò character 坐 is an ideogrammatic compound with two 人; "people" sitting on the 土; "ground"; and wàng (忘) is a phono-semantic compound with the "heart-mind radical" semantic element and a wáng (亡; "lose; disappear; flee; die; escape") phonetic and semantic element. Wáng (亡) and wàng (忘) are etymologically cognate, explained as "(Mentally lost:) absent-minded, forget" (Karlgren, or "'to lose' (from memory)"

Accurately translating zuòwàng is problematic. Compare the remarkable similarities among dictionary translation equivalents.

- "be in a state of mental abstraction" - Herbert Giles
- "to sit in a state of mental abstraction" - Robert Henry Mathews
- "oblivious of oneself and one's surroundings; free from worldly concerns" - Liang Shih-chiu & Chang Fang-chieh
- "oblivious of one's surroundings, free from worldly concerns" - Lin Yutang
- "① be oblivious of oneself and one's surroundings ② be free from worldly concerns" - John DeFrancis

Kohn explains translating wàng as "oblivion".

Zuowang 坐忘 "sitting in oblivion," signifies a state of deep meditative absorption and mystical oneness, during which all sensory and conscious faculties are overcome and which is the base point for attaining Dao. I translate wang as "oblivion" and "oblivious" rather than "forgetting" or "forgetful" because the connotation of "forget" in English is that one should remember but doesn't do so, or—if used intentionally—that one actively and intentionally does something in the mind. None of these holds true for what ancient and medieval Daoists were about. This is borne out both by the language and the writings: the word wang in Chinese consists of the character xin for "mind-heart", usually associated with conscious and emotional reactions to reality and the word wang for "obliterate" or "perish". The implication is – as indeed described in the sources – that one lets go of all kinds of intentional and reactive patterns and comes to rest in oneness with spirit and is ready to merge completely with Dao.

The synonyms yíwàng (遺忘) and wàngquè (忘卻) mean "forget; oblivion".

Daoist zuòwàng meditation had parallels in other Chinese religions and philosophies. The practice of jingzuo (靜坐; "quiet sitting") was first recorded in the (third century BCE) Legalist classic Hanfeizi. Neo-Confucian leaders like Zhu Xi (1130-1200) and Wang Yangming (1472–1529) advocated jingzuo meditation. (静坐示威; Jingzuo shiwei is the modern Chinese word for "sit-in"). The Chinese Buddhist practice of zuochan (坐禪; "sitting meditation") (namely, Japanese zazen) uses the word chan "meditation; abstraction; trance", and zuosi (坐思; "sitting contemplation") uses si "think; consider; deliberate". Compare the Buddhist word zuowang (坐亡; "sitting death; passing away while sitting in meditation"), which is the ideal manner of death for eminent monks and nuns.

== Classical usages ==
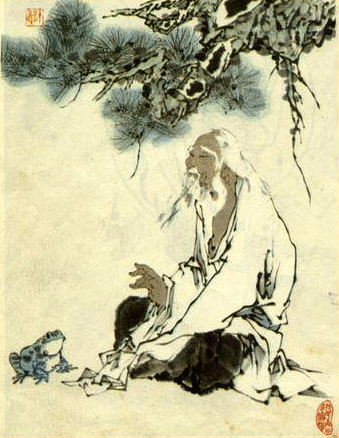
Zhuangzi

Chinese classics first used zuòwàng "sitting forgetting" around the third century BCE, during the late Warring States period.

=== Zhuangzi ===
The Daoist Zhuangzi had the earliest recorded reference to zuòwàng. One of the (c. 3rd century BCE) core Zhuangzi "Inner Chapters" (6, 大宗師) mentions zuòwàng "sitting forgetting" meditation in a famous dialogue between Confucius and his favorite disciple Yan Hui, who "ironically "turns the tables" on his master by teaching him how to "sit and forget". Yan Hui describes forgetting the basic virtues of Confucianism: li ("rites; ritual; morals"), yue (樂; "music"), ren ("benevolence; human-heartedness; altruism"), and yi ("justice; righteousness; significance").

"I'm making progress," said Yen Hui.

"What do you mean?" asked Confucius.
"I have forgotten rites and music."
"Not bad, but you still haven't got it."
Yen Hui saw Confucius again on another day and said, "I'm making progress."
"What do you mean?"
"I have forgotten humaneness and righteousness."
"Not bad, but you still haven't got it."
Yen Hui saw Confucius again on another day and said, "I'm making progress."
"What do you mean?"
"I sit and forget."
"What do you mean, 'sit and forget'?" Confucius asked with surprise.
"I slough off my limbs and trunk," said Yen Hui, "dim my intelligence, depart from my form, leave knowledge behind, and become identical with the Transformational Thoroughfare. This is what I mean by 'sit and forget'."

"If you are identical," said Confucius, "then you have no preferences. If you are transformed, then you have no more constants. It's you who is really the worthy one! Please permit me to follow after you."

Compare the above Zhuangzi translation by Victor H. Mair with the following.

- "I neglect my body and allow it to become effete; I discard my intelligence; so that, divesting myself of all corporealties [sic] and permitting all knowledge to flow away I have become as one who has attained to complete perspicuity of vision. This is what I mean by sitting in perfect abstraction."
- "My connexion with the body and its parts is dissolved; my perceptive organs are discarded. Thus leaving my material form, and bidding farewell to my knowledge, I am become one with the Great Pervader. This I call sitting and forgetting all things."
- "I have discarded my reasoning powers. And by thus getting rid of body and mind, I have become ONE with the Infinite. This is what I mean by getting rid of everything."
- "I smash up my limbs and body, drive out perception and intellect, cast off form, do away with understanding, and make myself identical with the Great Thoroughfare. This is what I mean by sitting down and forgetting everything."
- "I let organs and members drop away, dismiss eyesight and hearing, part from the body and expel knowledge, and go along with the universal thoroughfare. This is what I mean by 'just sit and forget'."
- "I cast off my limb and trunk, give up my hearing and sight, leave my physical form and deprive myself of my mind. In this way, I can identify myself with Tao. This is the so-called 'sitting and forgetting'."

Another passage which discusses the recovery or attainment of oblivion is one which describes the progress of Buliang Yi 卜梁倚 under the guidance of Nüyu 女偊 (Female Hunchback):

After three days, he was able to put the world outside himself Once he could do this, I continued my support and after seven days, he was able to put beings outside himself. Once he could do this, I continued my support, and after nine days, he was able to put life outside himself. Once he could do this, he achieved the brightness of dawn, and after this, he could see his own aloneness. After he had managed to see his own aloneness, he could do away with past and present, and after that, he was able to enter [a state of] no life and no death.

Apophatic meditation practice can also be seen in the following Zhuangzhi passages which speak of "fasting the heartmind":

"You must fast! I will tell you what that means. Do you think that it is easy to do anything while you have a heart-mind? If you do, the luminous cosmos will not support you...Make your aspirations one! Don't listen with your ears; listen with your heart-mind. No, don't listen with your heart-mind; listen with qi. 8 Listening stops with the ears, the heart-mind stops with joining, but qi is empty and waits on all things. The Dao gathers in emptiness alone. Emptiness is the fasting of the heart-mind."

I always fast in order to quiet my mind. When I have fasted for three days, I no longer have any thought of congratulations or rewards, of titles or stipends. When I have fasted for five days, I no longer have any thought of praise or blame, of skill or clumsiness. When I have fasted for seven days, I am so still that I forget I have four limbs and a body-form or structure. By that time, the ruler and his court no longer exist for me. My skill is concentrated and all outside distractions fade away.

==== Interpretation ====
Roth refers to the apophatic practice of Daoist breath meditation as "inner cultivation", evident in Yan Hui meaning: "to lose visceral awareness of the emotions and desires, which, for the early Daoists, have "physiological" bases in the various organs", "to deliberately cut off sense perception", and "to lose bodily awareness and remove all thoughts from consciousness." Kohn says, "This passage presents a mental state of complete unknowing, of loss of personal identity and self, and a kind of total immersion in the Non-being of the universe."

The Zhuangzi has other allusions to meditation. Yan Hui asks Confucius about xinzhai (心齋; "fasting of the mind") (4), and two chapters discuss the question "Can you really make your body become like a withered carcass and your mind like dead ashes?" (2, 24). Harold Oshima clarifies that for Zhuangzi, "forgetting" means to empty the xin "heart; mind", "just as one empties one's stomach by fasting. This idea of "forgetting" is essential, frequently cited as the most important hurdle in the quest for sagehood. It does not refer, however, to the simple displacing of facts from the mind."

The Xuanxue (lit. "Arcane Learning") "Neo-Daoist" philosopher Guo Xiang (d. 312 CE) redacted the Zhuangzi text, and wrote a commentary, which explains zuowang.

In a state of sitting in oblivion, what could there be unforgotten? First one forgets all outer manifestations (ji 迹), then one also forgets that which causes the manifestations. On the inside, one is unaware that there is a self (shen 身), on the outside one never knows that there is heaven and earth. Thus one becomes utterly empty and can unite with the changes, leaving nothing unpervaded.

Guo refers to the Xuanxue philosophical distinction between ben (本; 'root') (Daoist underlying ground of Being) and ji "traces" (apparent Confucian virtues), "as everything is a trace of the Ultimate Truth, neither real because is not the Truth, nor false because it is its manifestation". In addition, "Guo Xiang interprets the attained state of oneness as one of going along with the changes, adding an ecstatic element of transformation to the basically enstatic notion of oblivion".

The translators render 大通; datong as "Great Pervader", "the Infinite", "Great/ universal/Transformational Thoroughfare", and "Tao". Mair explains that "Transformational Thoroughfare" follows the Huainanzi graphic variant (or copyist's error) of hua (化; "transform; change; convert") for 大 ("big; great").

According to Kohn, oblivion and the goal of zuòwàng is associated with Hundun (混沌; "Chaos"), the primordial and cosmic root of creation which is one with Dao. A figure associated with Chaos, Vast Concealment (鴻蒙; Hongmeng) teaches the following meditation instructions in the Zhuangzi, which is termed "mind nourishing" (心養; xinyang):

Just take the position of nonaction and all things unfold naturally. Let your body and limbs fall away, expel perception and intellect, leave relations and things behind in oblivion. Become mystically one with the immense and boundless, release your mind and free your spirit. Be silent and without an active spirit soul [that interacts with the world], and the ten thousand things will each return to their root. Each return to their root and rest in unknowing—dark, obscure, chaotic: they live out their lives like this. However, the moment you try to know this state, you have already effected a separation from it. Don't ask its name, don't measure its foundation—it's the spontaneous life of each being.

Guo Xiang comments that zuowang is a practice which allows one to recover the primordial cosmic state which has been lost during human development. He calls this first state "Chaos Complete" (混成; huncheng) and says:

This means being oblivious of Heaven and Earth, doing away with beings. On the outside not examining time and space, on the inside never conscious of one's body-self. Thus one can be boundless and unattached, going along with beings and fully according with all.

The Tang dynasty Daoist scholar Cheng Xuanying 成玄英 (fl. 631-650) wrote a Zhuangzi commentary, linking zhzuowang to jianwang (兼忘; "twofold forgetfulness"), based upon the abstruse two-truths theory of Chinese Buddhist monk Jizang (549-623). Kohn explains, "First one forgets the outer reality (Being), then one forgets its underlying ground (Non-being). Once beyond these two, one reaches a state of both Being and Non-being, which, once again obliterated, becomes one of neither Being nor Non-being, a state of perception that neither accepts nor negates, and is sensorially aware yet utterly pure."

=== Dao De Jing ===
Some passages from the Dao De Jing give further support and context to the practice of Daoist apophatic meditation. Chapter 12 states that one should control the senses since overindulgence leads to loss: "The five colors will cause the eyes to go blind, the five tones will cause the ears to be deaf, the five flavors will cause the palate to be spoiled".

The practitioner is also said to leave the outside world behind them: "Cut off contacts, shut the doors, and to the end of life there will be peace without toil" (ch. 52, 56), it likewise says one should "abandon learning" and be "like an infant". The practice is said to be one of "decreasing and again decreasing" (ch. 48).

The Tao Te Ching also notes that the sense of self and body is the source of our vexations: "The body-self is the reason why I have terrible vexations. If I did not have a body-self, what trouble would I have?" (ch. 13).

Through this practice one can return to the Dao: "All things flourish, but each returns to its root. This return to the root means stillness, it is called recovering original destiny. Recovering original destiny is called the eternal, and to know the eternal is called brightness" (ch. 16).

=== Neiye ===
The Neiye (內業; "Inward Training") is another important source for the early practice of Daoist sitting meditation. It appears as part of the Xinshu (心術; "the Techniques of the Heart-mind"), chapters of the Guanzi. It describes a method leading to oblivion/forgetfulness which is based on alignment of the body and its Qi (subtle breath). This text describes the practice of refining one's Qi through preparatory practices like moderation in diet, withdrawal from sense stimulation, and proper physical posture. It discusses a contemplative process involving a "fourfold alignment": 1. Aligning the body (正形; zhengxing) 2. Aligning the four limbs (正四體; zheng siti; "Four limbs firm and fixed") 3. Aligning the qi (正氣; zhengqi) 4. Aligning the heart-mind (正心; zhengxin). Through an upright posture and deep breaths, one creates a sense of quiet within and a well ordered mind, which allows for Qi to develop and their mind to become clear and serene.

=== Huainanzi ===
The (c. 139 BCE) philosophical compendium Huainanzi includes another version of the anecdote about Yan Hui explaining zuòwàng to his teacher Confucius.

"I am making progress," said Yan Hui.

"What do you mean?" asked Confucius.
"I have forgotten Rites and Music."
"Not bad, but you still haven't got it."
Yan Hui saw Confucius on another day and said, "I am making progress."
"What do you mean?"
"l have forgotten Humaneness and Rightness."
"Not bad, but you still haven't got it."
Yan Hui saw Confucius again on another day and said, "I sit and forget."
"What do you mean 'sit and forget'?" Confucius asked with surprise.
"I slough off my limbs and trunk," said Yan Hui, "dim my intelligence, depart from my form, leave knowledge behind, and immerse myself in the conduits of transformation. This is what I mean by 'sit and forget'."
"If you are immersed," said Confucius, "then you have no preferences. If you are transformed, then you have no more constants. It is you who is really the worthy one! Please permit me to follow after you."
Therefore the Laozi says:
"When nourishing your ethereal soul and embracing the One –
can you not let them go?
In concentrating your qi and attaining softness,

can you be like an infant?" (12)

The Huainanzi version appends a Daodejing (10) quotation, which is not found in the Zhuangzi. Besides some minor differences – such as exchanging li and yue with ren and yi, and writing huatong "Transformational Thoroughfare" for datong "Great Thoroughfare" – these two versions are conspicuously similar. Major et al caution against concluding that the Huainanzi compilers drew upon the Zhuangzi. Roth suggests that the received Zhuangzi text may have been compiled, along with the Huainanzi, at the Huainan court of Liu An.

== Tang dynasty ==
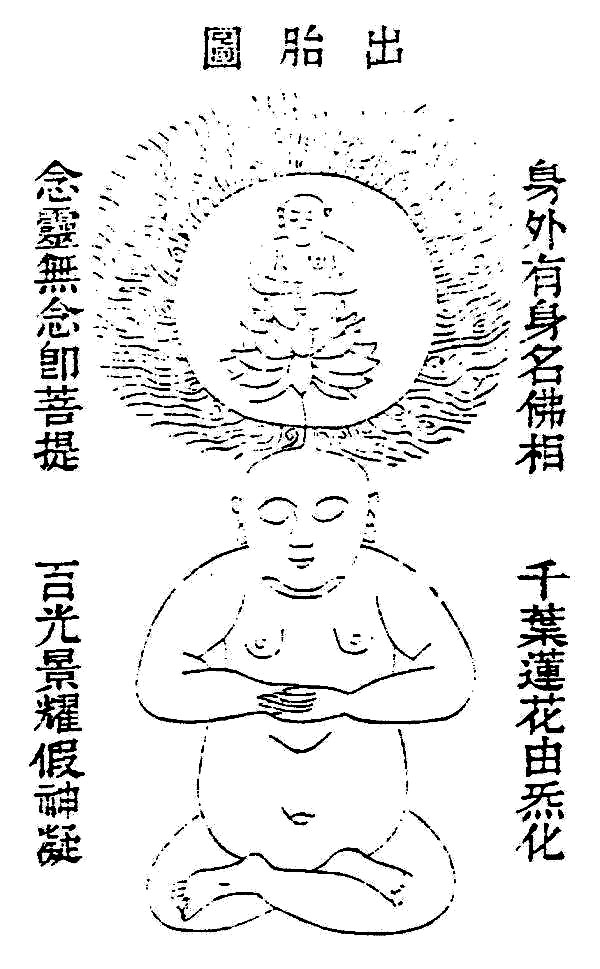
Illustration to chapter 5 of Liu Huayan's Huimingjing, showing a Taoist meditator in Full Lotus Posture (a Buddhist influence).

According to Livia Kohn, further development of the practice of zuowang occurred during the Tang dynasty, when Daoists of the "Twofold Mystery" (重玄; Chongxuan) and "Highest Clarity" (上清; Shangqing) schools wrote texts which discuss oblivion/forgetfulness. The treatises of this period, are more complex and detailed, with philosophical argumentation which includes Buddhist concepts as well as additions to the practice, like visualizations.

=== Zuowanglun tradition ===
The Shangqing School (上清; "Supreme Clarity") began during the Western Jin dynasty, and their texts are also a source for the practice of zuowang. The most influential zuowang text of this tradition is Sima Chengzhen's (647–735) Zuowanglun (坐忘論; "Essay on Sitting and Forgetting", DZ 1036"). This text was very influential and according to Kohn, was central to a Daoist school of meditation associated with Sima Chengzhen and located in the Tiantai range. This tradition was also influenced by Buddhist meditation as practiced in the Tiantai school.

The text has survived in two editions: one in Zhang Junfang's Yunji Qiqian (雲笈七籤) and Xu Song's Quan Tangwen (全唐文), and another in the Daozang. A shorter Zuowanglun copy was inscribed on a stele erected on Mount Wangwu in 829. Other relevant texts from Tang Dynasty masters (such as Sun Simiao and Wu Yun) associated with the Zuowanglun tradition include the Dingguan jing (定觀經; "Scripture on Stability and Observation, DZ 400"), the Cunshen lianqi ming (存神鍊氣 銘; "Inscription on Visualizing Spirit and Refining Qi, DZ 834"), the Neiguan jing (內觀經; "Scripture of Inner Observation, DZ 641") and the Tianyinzi (天隱子; "Book of the Master of Heavenly Seclusion, DZ 1026"). According to Kohn, The Tianyizi was widely published, and is still used among qigong practitioners today. According to Kohn, the Zuowanglun outlines seven steps in the progress of zuowang meditation:

1. "Respect and Faith" (敬信; Jingxin) - trusting in Dao and having respect for the teaching and process taught by the masters. Sun Simiao associates this with prudence and morality rooted in "awe and care" (憂畏; youwei). Basic moral integrity includes controlling emotions, letting go of possessions and being honest.
2. "Interception of karma" (斷緣; Duanyuan) - being free from worldly and social affairs and desires, in some texts like the Tianyinzi, this means seclusion in a quiet chamber (靜室; jingshi) and is also associated with fasting and daoyin practices.
3. "Restraining the Mind" (收心; Shouxin) - usually achieved by sitting quietly (靜坐; jingzuo), focusing the mind on breathing, or anchoring it in a particular point in the body and getting rid of all thoughts, the goal being "no-mind" (無心; wuxin) and a "calm mind" (安心; anxin).
4. "Detachment from Affairs" (簡事; Jianshi) - at this stage the mind has found placidity and a relaxed acceptance, it is freed from worldly desires and concerns and has given up "whatever is not essentially necessary to sustain life" being solely dedicated to flowing along with Dao and being content and in accord with its movements.
5. "True Observation" (真觀; Zhenguan) - Kohn writes that there are two forms of guan or observation: "the "inner observation" (內觀; neiguan) of the different parts and aspects of the body, including the visualization of its energetic patterns and residing divinities; and the "perfect observation" 真觀; zhenguan) of reality which involves the establishment of a witness consciousness that allows the detached inspection of one's life and self in order to attain a purified view of the world." At this stage, the practitioner begins to identify with the Dao and the universe at large, instead of their limited physical and personal sense of self.
6. "Great Stability" or "Cosmic Peace" (泰定; Taiding) - A state fullness, tranquility and rest in which there is no more seeing, conscious action or sense of self. All mental activity is obliterated and all knowledge forgotten. As the Zhuangzi and the Zuowanglun state, "the body-form is like dried wood, the mind is like dead ashes; there are no more impulses, no more searches." The Wuchu jing states that at this stage the mind is "like a deep abyss: unadulterated, it regards the myriad phenomena equally" and also bright like "a mirror of [universal] light, where the [world's] dust and grime have no place to stick".
7. "Realizing the Dao" (得道; Dedao) - Wisdom of the Dao is fully achieved, Dao subsumes all knowledge, self concepts, etc and the adept transcends everything and is freed from all worldly limitations. According to Kohn, "this is liberation (神解; shenjie) and attainment of 'spirit pervasion' (神通; shentong), which means the emitting of a bright radiance and attainment of supernatural powers."

As Kohn notes, the texts of this tradition make it clear that the progress through these stages happens gradually.

=== Twofold Mystery and Northern celestial masters ===
One influential text from this period is the Xisheng jing, a text associated with the Daoist monastery of Louguan, a center of the Northern Celestial Masters located in the Zhongnan mountains. This work is widely cited and commented upon and describes meditation in terms of "reaching emptiness and nonbeing, peace and tranquility". In his commentary on the Xinsheng Jing, Wei Jie states:

The more advanced religious practice leading toward Dao is meditation. The practitioner concentrates his internal qi and visualizes the body divinities. Sensory impressions cease. Cravings for outer things diminish. The result is complete oblivion. On the outside become oblivious of all seeing and hearing and in due course all desires to see and hear will cease. On the inside become completely oblivious of thinking and tasting, and in due course all craving for language and food will end. When all without and within has ceased, one can be serene and obscure. In such a state one will return to the state when there were no beings.

On zuowang, Twofold mystery commentator Cheng Xuanying states:

Even though auditory perception belongs to the ears and visual power is a function of the eyes, they ultimately depend on the mind. Once one has awakened to the fact that the body does not really exist, that the myriad states of the mind are empty, then one can smash up one's body, drive out intellect and do away with understanding.

According to Livia Kohn:

Twofold Mystery thus envisions the mystical process in two steps, described as double forgetting (jianwang 兼忘). Practitioners must first discard all concepts of being, then proceed to discard all ideas of nonbeing. These two are, moreover, identified as mental projections (jing 境), i.e., illusory mental imaginations that are projected outward and create an apparent reality of "being;" and active wisdom (zhi 智) or mind as such (xin 心), the inherent function of active consciousness which signifies "nonbeing". "Forgetting" both means the reorganization of ordinary consciousness to absolute consciousness and again from absolute consciousness to no consciousness at all in complete oblivion. Yet the sagely state is not nothingness but the "embodiment of the Dao of Middle Oneness," a state of radiance and surging activity.

Furthermore, Kohn states that this tradition was influenced by Buddhist Madhyamaka thought and meditative praxis. The Daojiao yishu (道教義樞; "The Pivotal Meaning of Daoist Teaching, DZ 1129") for example, adopts and integrates many Buddhist ideas. In this work, zuowang is listed as one of several meditative practices, which include meditation on deities and inhaling Qi. The Daojiao yishu makes use of Buddhist Madhyamaka analysis and Daoist apophasis in its explication of meditative progress. It breaks down the sense of self identity in terms of the Buddhist five aggregates and then goes on to analyze the "emptiness" of real and apparent dharmas [phenomena]. Later works from the Twofold Mystery tradition continued to develop the theory and practice of sitting in forgetfulness. For example, the Sanlun yuan-zhi (三論元旨; "Primordial Pointers of the Three Theories, DZ 1039") describes a sequence of meditative progress beginning with "purity" (澄; cheng), followed by "quietude" (靜; jing), "oblivion" (忘; wang), "enlightenment" (明; ming), "open pervasion" (達; da) and finally to realizing awakening and completing "perfection" (了悟成真; liaowu chengzhen)).

== Medieval Daoism and Quanzhen school ==
During the Song dynasty (960–1279), few passages used the term zuòwàng, and Daoist meditation texts shift in focus on what it means to attain the Dao. Song dynasty Daoist traditions emphasized ecstatic excursions to other worlds to commune with deities and internal alchemy transformations while using zuòwàng to indicate preparatory or secondary meditation practices. Song Internal alchemy texts also see zuòwàng as a supportive practice and interpret it in Buddhist terms comparable to sitting in absorption (坐禪; zuochan).

One later Daoist tradition which practiced similar forms of apophatic meditation was the Quanzhen (Complete Perfection) school, which remains to this day a major Daoist school in China. Quanzhen was founded by Wang Chongyang (1113–1170) and his direct disciples. A central practice of this tradition is the cultivation of clarity and purity by being of no mind and no thoughts and not being attached to anything, this allows one to recover the primordial and deathless 'Real Nature' that humans have lost in their worldly concerns. Practicing "seated meditation" (打坐; dazuo), "quiet sitting" (靜坐; jingzuo), "sitting cross-legged" (跏趺坐; jiafu zuo), or "aligned sitting" (正坐; zhengzuo) was also a very important practice for the Quanzhen school, for which isolation and seclusion was also paramount. The three main types of sitting meditation in this tradition are "Cultivating clarity and stillness" (清靜; qingjing), "Inner observation" (內觀; neiguan), and "Internal alchemy" (內丹; neidan).

In its practice of mental training, which focuses on stabilizing or settling the heartmind, Quanzhen took some inspiration from Chan Buddhism and taught that one must be aware during all of one's situations and life activities. This can be seen in the following passage of Wang Chongyang:

Now, to "have a sit" (dazuo, to practice meditation) does not refer to the act of assuming the proper posture and closing the eyes. Such is but false sitting. [To practice] true sitting you must throughout the twelve [double-] hours, whether staying, going, sitting, or lying, throughout all your motion and stillness, make your mind be like Mt. Tai—unmoving and unwavering. Grasp and cut off the four gates of your eyes, ears, mouth, and nose. Do not allow outer scenery to enter in. If there is any stirring of thought even the size of a silk thread or a single fine fur, it cannot be called "quiet sitting." One who is able to be like this already has his/her name recorded in the ranks of the immortals, even though his/her body resides in the dusty world. He/she need not travel afar to consult another person. In other words, the wise sage (the Real Nature with its intuitive wisdom) is in his/her very own body. In a hundred years his/her merit will be full; shedding his/her shell, he/she ascends to Realization. The single pill of cinnabar is completed, and his/her spirit wanders the eight surfaces.

Now, in speaking of the ways of the mind: Always serenely the mind is kept motionless. Darkly, silently, you do not look at the myriad objects. Dimly, murkily, without an inside nor an outside, you have no thoughts even the size of a silk thread or a single fine fur. This is the stability of mind; it should not be subdued. If you follow your surroundings and give rise to thoughts, stumbling and falling while seeking now the head and now the tail, this is called the disorderly mind. You must cut it off immediately, and you must not follow its whims. It damages and destroys your Tao-virtue and it diminishes your Nature and Life. Whether staying, going, sitting, or lying down, you must diligently subdue it. What you hear, see, know, and understand is but a disease and [an] ailment to you.

Likewise, one of Wang's main disciples, Ma Yu, teaches:

You should reform your misdeeds, but this is not [only] to be done through seated meditation. You should keep your mind stable for a long time. Going, staying, sitting, and lying down (i.e., all daily activities—a phrase common in Chan discourse) are the practice of the Tao. Gentlemen, quit giving rise to thoughts! Quickly seek out your Nature and Life. If you can just clear your mind and abandon your desires, you will be a Divine Immortal. Acknowledge nothing else and stop having doubts! These are proper and true words. You only need to be constantly clear and constantly pure. Practice this diligently.

Another similar meditation practice taught by Wang was based on focusing one's attention on the lower belly, an area known as the Ocean of Qi: "With your mind think of your spirit residing lengthily in your [Lower] Elixir Field, embracing and guarding the primal qi, without letting it get scattered and lost. This is the Method of Embracing the One."

== Modern interpretations ==
Schools of East Asian Buddhism adopted zuòwàng practices, notably Chinese Chan, Japanese Zen, and Tibetan Dzogchen.

Through its practice, adepts eliminate all sensory perception and the conscious mind as inherently dualistic and potentially misleading, avoiding the use of the sensory apparatus in attaining higher states. Practitioners thus strive to access what they call pure experience or "sitting in oblivion of everything" by letting go of all ordinary perception while strengthening intuition, the potency of the inborn, natural mind—a pure reflection of original cosmos in human beings. Posture and body control become essential; all analytical, dualistic thinking as well as connection to deities are radically overcome.

Daoists today use zuòwàng to mean a specific form of practice involving loss of self and conscious thought.

Victor H. Mair, polymathic Professor of Chinese Language and Literature at the University of Pennsylvania, explains:

Tsowang ("sit-forget") is the technical term in early Taoism for meditation. It corresponds roughly to Buddhist ch'an (i.e., Zen, from Sanskrit dhyāna) but more specifically to samādhi ("conjoining"), a trance state in which the mind loses itself in the object of contemplation. This may be thought of as complete obliviousness. There are numerous precise stages and states in Indian meditation. In general, they may be described, in Patanjali's term, as various types of citta-vṛtti-nirodha ("mental-action-control"). The highest levels are the various types of trance (śamana, "calming, pacification") in which the yogi becomes one with the universe and in which all trace of mental activity ceases. Similar trance states are described in the Chuang Tzu, although here the emphasis is less on the voiding (śūnyatā) of the mind than it is on "bodilessness" (videha) or exteriorization.

Liu Xingdi of the Leigutai Temple in Shaanxi says:

Zuowang is allowing everything to slip from the mind, not dwelling on thoughts, allowing them to come and go, simply being at rest. It is important to take a good posture to still the body and calm the mind. Otherwise qi disperses, attention wanders, and the natural process is disturbed. Just remain empty and there is no separation from Dao. Then wisdom will arise and bring forth light, which is the clear qi of the person. Do not think too much about the theory of this, otherwise you are sure to disturb the mind. It is like the sun rising in the east and setting in the west. To think about stopping it halfway is a futile exercise. Just trust the inherent natural process.

Shi Jing, leader of the British Taoist Association, explains:

Zuowang is to sit and forget. What we forget is the thing we hold most dearly: self, with all its opinions, beliefs, and ideals. We can be so caught up in the concept of self that we only see the world as a place to fulfill personal ambition and desire.

Eva Wong, author and Quanzhen practitioner, says:

Zuowang is a dropping of conceptions. When we drop conceptions, what we have is the natural emergence of the natural self, the natural celestial mind, which has been with us all the time. It is only because of our conceptions that we can't experience it. So when we practice zuowang, we are simply saying that here is a method where we can begin to drop conceptions.

Louis Komjathy, Daoist studies scholar and ordained Daoist priest states:

Apophatic meditation focuses on emptiness and stillness. It is contentless, non-conceptual, and non-dualistic. One simply empties the heart-mind of all emotional and intellectual content...

...First, one withdraws from sensory engagement with the phenomenal world. Then one empties the heart-mind of intellectual and emotional content. Finally, one enters the state of cosmological integration, wherein qi, subtle breath or one's vital force, is the primary layer of being that one listens to. This condition is described as "unity" (一; yi), "emptiness" (空; kong or 虚; xu), and "identification" (同; 通; tong). As the Dao is Stillness from the Daoist prospective, by entering one's own interior silence one returns to one's innate nature, which is the Dao.

== Modern research ==
Research on meditation has examined basic zuòwàng relaxation techniques such as deep breathing and attentional control, which Kohn says, "have a profound impact on human physiology and neurology, activating the parasympathetic nervous system and creating an inner state of receptivity and caIm."

Santee compares Herbert Benson's "Relaxation Response" with Daoist zuòwàng meditation practices. Benson (2000:104-106) cites the classic Zhuangzi passage on Yan Hui's zuòwàng as an example of culturally diverse methods for evoking the relaxation response and reducing chronic stress.

The psychiatrist Charles E. Stroebel's "Quieting Reflex" also uses concentration for healing. Kohn describes it as "somewhat closer to Daoist practice," notably the notion of qi circulating through meridians and organs.

The holistic psychologist John Diamond's "Behavioral Kinesiology" (1978), which is based upon the controversial applied kinesiology, involves social, physical, and psychological measures to enhance bodily well-being, which Kohn finds to be "very much in agreement with those described by Sun Simiao and Sima Chengzhen."

Livia Kohn concludes:

To sum up, while many of the practices associated with oblivion as an integrated system are still present today—as much as zuòwàng itself is still practiced in Daoist communities—the focus for the most part has shifted toward the more immediate gratification of modern desires: stress release, pain control, healing, and enhanced success and well-being. In addition, there are certain branches of modern science: such as kinesiology and energy medicine, that allow the integration of traditional Daoist views of body and mind into a contemporary scientific framework and are shaping current new developments.

== See also ==
- Ego death
- Samadhi
- Fana (Sufism)
- Mushin
