= Zhang Junfang =

Zhang Junfang may refer to:

- Zhang Junfang (poet), Tang dynasty poet
- Zhang Junfang (writer), Northern Song dynasty writer
