= Alan K. L. Chan =

Chinese philosopher

Alan Kam-leung Chan

Education
- Education: University of Winnipeg (BA); University of Manitoba (MA); University of Toronto (PhD)

Philosophical work
- Era: 21st-century philosophy
- Region: Western philosophy
- Institutions: Chinese University of Hong Kong, Nanyang Technological University, National University of Singapore, University of Manitoba
- Main interests: Chinese culture, philosophy of religion

Alan Kam-leung Chan is a Chinese philosopher and the provost at Singapore Management University. Previously, he has served as provost and J.S. Lee Professor of Chinese Culture at the Chinese University of Hong Kong, and vice-president of the Nanyang Technological University and Toh Puan Mahani Idris Daim Chair Professor of Humanities at this university. Chan is known for his works on Chinese culture and daoist philosophy.

== Books ==
- Philosophy and Religion in Early Medieval China (Lead editor; with Y.K. Lo). Albany: State University of New York Press, 2010
- Interpretation and Literature in Early Medieval China (Lead editor; with Y.K. Lo). Albany: State University of New York Press, 2010
- Filial Piety in Chinese Thought and History (Lead editor; with Sor-hoon Tan). London: Routledge, 2004
- Historical Perspectives on East Asian Science, Technology, and Medicine (Lead editor; with G. Clancey and H.C. Loy). Singapore: Singapore University Press and World Scientific Publishing Company, 2002
- Mencius: Contexts and Interpretations (Editor). Honolulu: University of Hawaii Press, 2002
- Taoism: Outlines of a Chinese Religious Tradition (in Chinese and English; co-authored with C.Y. Lee and T. Tsu). Singapore: Taoist Federation, 1994
- Two Visions of the Way: A Study of the Wang Pi and the Ho-shang Kung Commentaries on the Lao-tzu. New York: State University of New York Press, 1991
