= Zuowanglun =

Taoist meditative text

- Traditional Chinese: 坐忘論
- Simplified Chinese: 坐忘论
- Literal meaning: sitting forgetting discussion
Transcriptions
Standard Mandarin
- Hanyu Pinyin: Zuòwànglùn
- Wade–Giles: Tso-wang lun

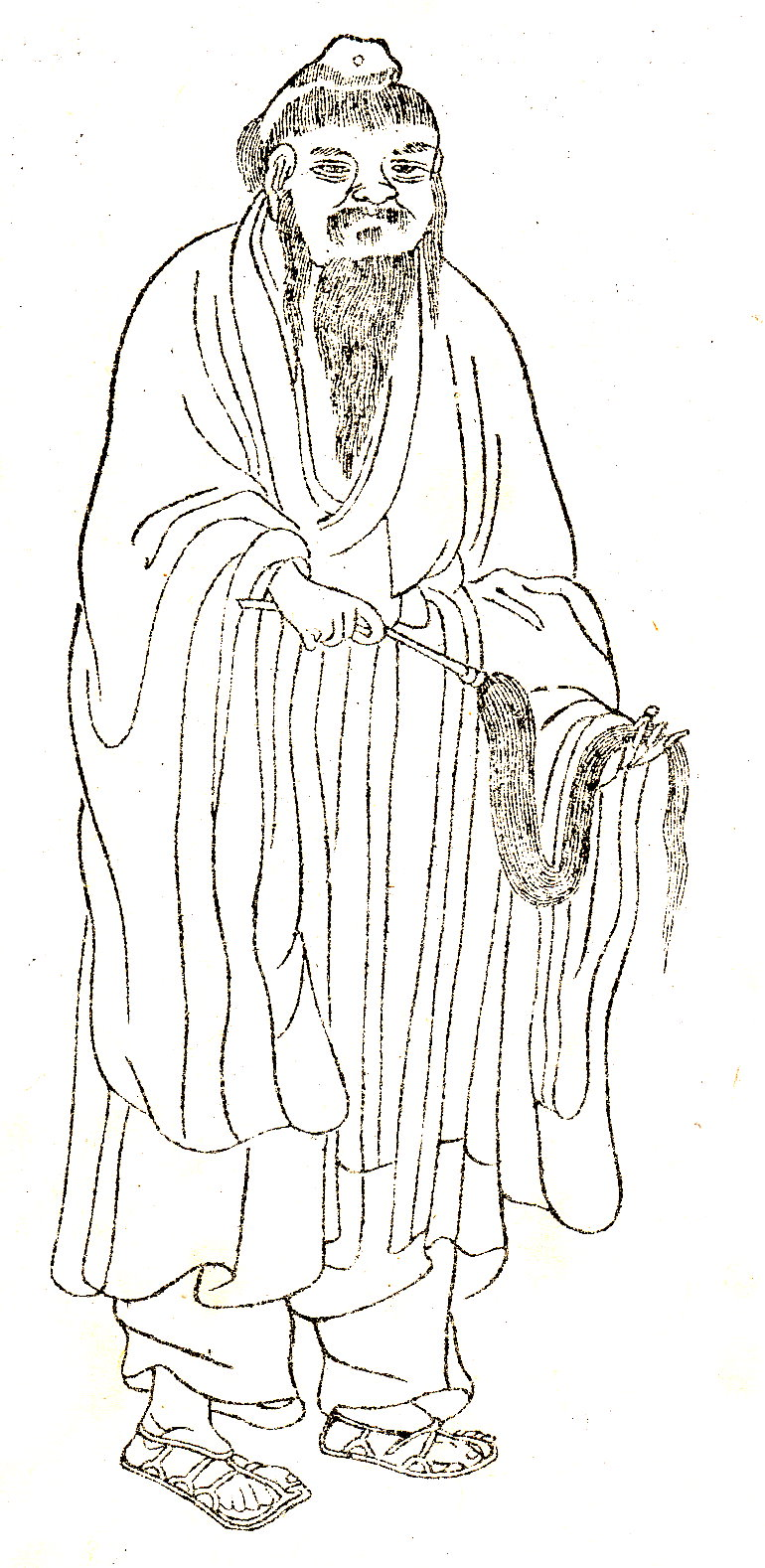
Image of Sima Chengzhen.

The Zuowanglun or Zuowang lun is a Taoist meditative text that was written by the Shangqing School patriarch Sima Chengzhen (647–735). During the Tang dynasty (618-907) Taoism incorporated many different practices for example reinterpreting the imported Buddhist practices from India with culturally accepted and trusted terminology, rites and rituals reshaping the face of this philosophy to be introduced and accepted by East Asia. The Zuowanglun combined meditation techniques from Taoism (e.g., 坐忘 zuòwàng "sitting forgetting", and 觀 guān "observation"), Buddhism (śamatha "calm abiding", and vipaśyanā "insight") and the Confucian concept (正心誠意).

== Author ==
Sima Chengzhen (or Si-ma Ch'eng-chen) 司馬承禎 (647–735), also known as Daoyin 道隐 "Recluse of the Tao" and Baiyunzi 白雲子 "Master of the White Cloud", was a native of Henan. He was a descendant of the Jin dynasty (266–420) imperial house, and his family included many high-ranking scholar-officials. Although Sima received a traditional education in the Confucian classics, he converted to Taoism, and was ordained by the Shangqing "Highest Clarity" School in 669. Sima was promoted to Shangqing Grand Master in 684, and became a favorite of the imperial court and aristocracy. Russell Kirkland (2008:911) describes Sima Chengzhen as "perhaps the most important Taoist of Tang times."

== Textual versions ==
There are two received Zuowanglun editions and a stone inscription on Mount Wangwu.

=== Received editions ===
The Zuowanglun text exists in two main editions. One is in Zhang Junfang's (1019) Yunji Qiqian 雲笈七籤 " Seven Cloudy Satchel" and Xu Song's (1819) Quan Tangwen 全唐文 "Complete Tang Literature". Another is in the (1444) Daozang "Taoist Canon" and (1796–1820) Daozang jiyao 道藏輯要 "Essentials of the Taoist Canon".

There are two prefaces with the text, one by the author Sima Chengzhen and another by the otherwise unknown recluse Zhenjing (真靜).

=== Stele inscription ===
A shorter Zuowanglun inscription on a stele, dated to the year 829, was placed in front of a temple dedicated to Sima Chengzhen erected in Jiyuan on Mount Wangwu, his last residence. It summarizes the key features of the text. Kohn says it "is probably an early forerunner", and translates this "Inscription on Oblivion".

== Content ==
The Zuowanglun elucidates seven steps, involving various practices, "including Buddhist-inspired concentration, observation, and absorption", that gradually lead one from ordinary consciousness to dedao 得道 "attaining the Dao; becoming enlightened".

1. Jingxin 敬信 "Respect and Faith"
2. Duanyuan 斷緣 "Interception of karma"
3. Shouxin 收心 "Restraining the Mind"
4. Jianshi 簡事 "Detachment from Affairs"
5. Zhenguan 真觀 "True Observation"
6. Taiding 泰定 "Intense Concentration"
7. Dedao 得道 "Realizing the Dao"

The Zhenjing preface explains.

As the author's understanding and viewpoint are extraordinary indeed, he clarifies Dao very well. First he leads the reader to feel "respect and faith" so that his mind may be no longer in mad confusion. Then he makes him "break off his karmic conditions" and factors, "tame his mind," and "detach himself from affairs" so that he can be serene in his physical structure and illuminated within. By the next step of "perfect observation" of center and periphery, being and nonbeing, he can then step into the "stability of cosmic peace," where the qi is peaceful and the spirit stable. Thus it is called "attaining Dao."

== Translations ==
There are English translations of the Zuowanglun by Livia Kohn, Thomas Cleary., and Wu Jyh Cherng, that originally translated to Brazilian Portuguese.

The title is translated as:

- Discourse on (Taoist) Meditation
- Seven Steps to the Tao
- Essay on Sitting in Oblivion
- Treatise on Abiding in Forgetfulness
- Discourse on Sitting-in-Forgetfulness
- On Sitting in Oblivion
- Discourse on Sitting and Forgetting

Kohn explains choosing "oblivion" instead of "forgetfulness".

I translate wang as "oblivion" and "oblivious" rather than "forgetting" or "forgetful" because the connotation of "forget" in English is that one should remember but doesn't do so, or – if used intentionally – that one actively and intentionally does something in the mind. None of these holds true for what ancient and medieval Daoists were about. This is borne out both by the language and the writings: the word wang in Chinese consists of the character xin for "mind-heart," usually associated with conscious and emotional reactions to reality and the word wang for "obliterate" or "perish." The implication is – as indeed described in the sources – that one lets go of all kinds of intentional and reactive patterns and comes to rest in oneness with spirit and is ready to merge completely with Dao.

== Related texts ==
The Zuowanglun is associated with six contemporaneous texts by Daoist mediation masters from the Chongxuan 重玄 "Twofold Mystery" and Shangqing "Highest Clarity" Schools. Sima Chengzhen led an influential school of Buddho-Daoist meditation centered on Mount Tiantai, which was also the headquarters of the Tiantai school of Buddhism.

The (early 8th century) Dingguanjing 定觀經 "Scripture on Concentration and Observation", or Dongxuan lingbao dingguanjing 洞玄靈寶定觀經 "Scripture on Concentration and Observation of the Numinous Treasure from the Cavern Mystery", appears three times in the Daoist Canon: as an appendix to the Zuowanglun edition, as a separate text (DZ 400), and in the Yunji Qiqian anthology. This 49-stanza text outlines the psychological transition from an ordinary perspective with emotions and desires to a mental state of stability and quietude. The popular Dingguanjing was summarized under the title Guanmiaojing 觀妙經 "Scripture on Concentration on the Mystery" (DZ 326).

The Cunshen lianqiming 存神鍊氣銘 "Inscription on Visualizing Spirit and Refining Qi" (DZ 834) is attributed to the Daoist physician and alchemist Sun Simiao (d. 682). This text first records five phases in taming the mind and seven stages in transforming the body into immortality, which the Zuowanglun appendix and Dingguanjing repeat.

The Tianyinzi 天隱子 "[Book of the] Master of Heavenly Seclusion" was allegedly transmitted by Wu Yun 吳筠 (d. 778) and edited by Sima Chengzhen, who wrote the "Oral Instructions" postface. This text is contained in the Daoist Canon (DZ 1026), and has been republished many times in non-Daoist collections. The Tianyinzi emphasizes gradual progress toward the Dao through simplicity, fasting, seclusion, visualization, sitting in forgetfulness, and spirit liberation. Present day qigong practitioners consider the Tianyinzi to be a core text.

The Xinmulun 心目論 "Treatise on Mind and Eyes", also by Wu Yun, is an imaginary dialogue between the heart-mind and eyes (DZ 1038). The mind accuses the eyes (representing the senses) of causing confusion and agitation, but the eyes argue that the mind is ultimately responsible. The mind resolves to eliminate thoughts with zuowang in order to achieve liberation. Wu Yun uses various water metaphors (frequently written with the water radical 水 or 氵) to describe mental activities. He emphasizes the distraught and unhappy state of mind with words like luan亂 "chaotic; confused" and Iun 淪 "engulfed; muddled"; and uses images like cheng hundun 乘混沌 "ride on pure chaos" and become one with the hanman 汗漫 "vast expanse of water" to express the mind's longing for clarity and freedom. Abstract purity and defilement are also expressed in water-terms of qing 清 "clarity; standing water that is lucid to the bottom" and zi 滓 "dregs; sediments; defilements".

The (late 6th century) Neiguanjing 內觀經 "Scripture of Inner Observation" (DZ 641), is written in the words of Laozi (deified as Lord Lao 老君). This treatise describes inner meditations on the human body, Buddho-Daoist psychological terms, and internal purification.

The Wuchujing 五廚經 "Scripture of the Five Kitchens" (DZ 763), was edited and annotated by Yin Yin 尹愔 and presented to the Tang court in 736. This mystical poem is devoted to the Five Zang "Organs", with "Kitchens" figuratively meaning qi processing in neidan "internal alchemy". The text is also transmitted in a Buddhist version. Modern Daoists consider the Wuchujing as talismanic and chant it for protection.
