= Daoxue =

Daoxue (simplified Chinese: 道学; traditional Chinese: 道學), sometimes translated as Taology, may refer to:

- Taoist philosophy
- Neo-Confucianism

== See also ==
- Taoism
- Confucianism
