= Neiye =

Oldest Chinese received text describing Daoist breath meditation techniques

- Ancient Large Seal Script for neiye 內業

Chinese name
- Traditional Chinese: 內業
- Simplified Chinese: 内业
- Literal meaning: inside business
Transcriptions
Standard Mandarin
- Hanyu Pinyin: nèiyè
- Bopomofo: ㄋㄟˋㄧㄝˋ
- Gwoyeu Romatzyh: neyyeh
- Wade–Giles: nei-yeh
- IPA: /neɪ̯⁵¹jiːp̚²/
Yue: Cantonese
- Jyutping: noi^{6}jip^{6}
Southern Min
- Hokkien POJ: lǎigia̍p
Middle Chinese
- Middle Chinese: njowH- ngjæp
Old Chinese
- Baxter–Sagart (2014): nˁəp-s-m-qʰap

Korean name
- Hangul: 내업
- Hanja: 內業
Transcriptions
- Revised Romanization: naeeop
- McCune–Reischauer: naeŏp

Japanese name
- Kanji: 内業
- Hiragana: ないぎょう
Transcriptions
- Revised Hepburn: naigyō

The c. 350 BCE Neiye (Chinese: 內業; trans. "Inward Training") is the oldest Chinese received text describing Daoist breath meditation techniques and qi circulation. After the Guanzi, a political and philosophical compendium, included the Neiye around the 2nd century BCE, it was seldom mentioned by Chinese scholars until the 20th century, when it was reevaluated as a "proto-Daoist" text that clearly influenced the Daode jing, Zhuangzi, and other classics. Neiye traditions also influenced Chinese thought and culture. For instance, it had the first references to cultivating the life forces jing "essence", qi "vital energy", and shen "spirit", which later became a fundamental concept in Daoist Neidan "internal alchemy", as well as the Three Treasures in traditional Chinese medicine.

Alluded to by Mencius and others, including other parts of the Guanzi, the Neiye was the most influential and detailed of the preserved older texts on self cultivation until the Mawangdui silk texts. The Mawangdui's texts on cultivation only went into broad circulation much later, a couple generations after the late Warring States period Han Feizi.

== Book ==
Sinologist A. C. Graham regarded the Neiye as "possibly the oldest 'mystical' text in China". Professor of religious studies Harold D. Roth describes it as "a manual on the theory and practice of meditation that contains the earliest references to breath control and the earliest discussion of the physiological basis of self-cultivation in the Chinese tradition", and perhaps the oldest extant text of Daoism.

=== Title ===
The title is a compound of two common Chinese words: nèi (内) meaning "inside; inner; internal" and yè (業; "work; deed; achievement; production").

In ancient Old Chinese that was used when the Neiye was compiled, the two titular component words had complex meanings. Bernhard Karlgren's classic Grammata Serica Recensa dictionary translates nèi (內) as "enter; to bring in, to present; take to heart"; and says the early characters for yè (業) depicted a "horizontal board of a bell stand or frame", which was used as a phonetic loan character for "initiate; work; action; deed; profession; fortune, inheritance; strong; terrible".

While many English-language authors transliterate the 內業 title as Neiye or Nei-yeh, some translate it as:

- The Workings of the Inner
- Inner Workings
- Operation of the Inner
- Inner Cultivation or Inner Development
- Inward Training
- Inner Training
- The Inner Enterprise

A. C. Graham's and Harold D. Roth's Inward Training is apparently the most common English title, owing to Roth's Neiye articles and translation.

=== Literary form ===
The Neiye 內業 is a collection of poetic verses describing a method of guided breathing meditation and the underlying cosmology of the Dao on which it is based. Roth calls the mystical method "inner cultivation", the goal of which is to directly apprehend this "all-pervading cosmic force".

The text contains a total of 1,622 characters, and the verses are written almost exclusively in rhymed prose. Most of the lines of verse are tetrasyllabic, that is, they contain four syllables each of which is represented by one character, but other patterns of five or more syllables sometimes occur. The rhymes occur most often at the end of every second line. Both the Neiye's rhymed literary form and philosophical content are similar to the more renowned Daode jing, which is about three times longer.

Take for example, Verse 2 (with rhyme words shown in Old Chinese reconstruction) discussing jing "vital energy":

Therefore this vital energy is:
Bright!—as if ascending the heavens [天 *ten];
Dark!—as if entering an abyss [淵 *wen];
Vast!—as if dwelling in an ocean [海 *xməɣ];
Lofty!—as if dwelling on a mountain peak [屺 *kiəɣ].
Therefore this vital energy
Cannot be halted by force, [力 *liək]
Yet can be secured by inner power [德 *tək].
Cannot be summoned by speech,
Yet can be welcomed by the awareness [意 *ˑiəɣ].
Reverently hold onto it and do not lose it:
This is called "developing inner power" [德 *tək].
When inner power develops and wisdom emerges,
The myriad things will, to the last one, be grasped [得 *tək].

Scholars infer two kinds of contextual evidence that the redactor of an initial written Neiye edition brought together a series of originally distinct verses: the variety of meter and rhyme in the lines, and the two usages of the conjunction shìgù 是故 “therefore". Riegel proposes that these poetic features of the Neiye would have facilitated memorization and recitation, suggesting that they might have been transmitted orally for a period of time before the compiler assembled and wrote them down.

Although extant editions of the Neiye text have only two or three general divisions, it is possible to identify distinct units based on semantic, syntactic, and phonological criteria. Some different proposed textual separations are: fifteen separate verses with some subdivisions; eighteen verses plus four subdivisions; and twenty-six separate verses.

=== Dating ===
The date when the Neiye was compiled is uncertain. Rickett dated the text to the late 4th or early 3rd century BCE, Graham to the 4th century BCE, and Roth to the mid-4th century BCE; it is thus generally dated to around 350–300 BCE. Campany rejects Roth's arguments for dating the Neiye to the 4th century BCE because they are based on his "speculative and wishful assumption" that political considerations were added only later to an "original Dao".

The problem of the dating of the Neiye is connected to some other texts within the Guanzi. Four chapters (篇; piān) have descriptions of meditation practices: 心術; Xinshu "Techniques of the Mind I and II" (chapters 36 and 37), 白心; Baixin "The Purified Mind" (38), and 內業; Neiye "Inward Training" (49). The Guanzi is a heterogenous collection of writings by diverse Legalist, Confucianist, and Daoist authors; compilation probably began around 300 BCE and material may have been added until 26 BCE when Liu Xiang edited the received text.

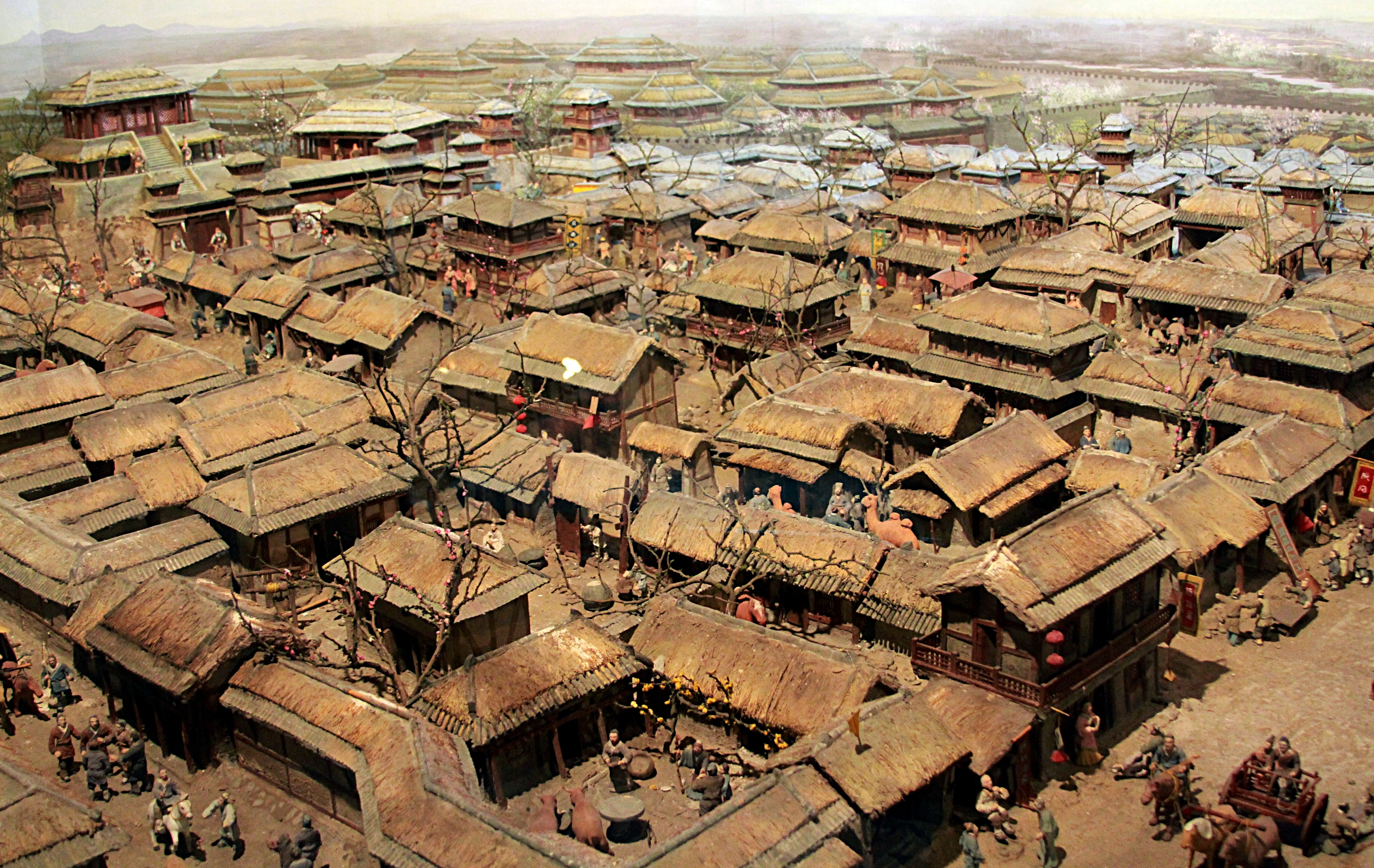
Model of ancient Linzi.

Since these four texts are the only Guanzi chapters to mention the significance of breath meditation, researchers tend to consider them together (Roth 1999: 18). Furthermore, all four exhibit the irregular rhyme patterns thought to be characteristic of the Chu region variety of Chinese. Many scholars have debated over the relationship between Neiye, Xinshu I and II, and Baixin. Most concur that these texts were written by Huang-Lao Daoist philosophers at the Jixia Academy in the Qi capital of Linzi, but many disagree over the dating of the texts and identity of the redactors. After analyzing the structure and rhetorical characteristics of the Daode jing, Neiye, Xinshu I, and Baixin, The Chinese linguist William H. Baxter proposed that they constitute a specific literary genre, which emerged from "a distinctive tradition of philosophical verse with strong oral elements and little concept of individual authorship".

In order to estimate the dates of compilation for these Guanzi writings about breath circulation techniques, Roth analyzed the linguistic features of the Neiye, Xinshu I and II, and Baixin; and concluded that the Neiye is a genuine 4th-century BCE text while the others are derived from it. The first three works have close conceptual and textual parallels, but the Baixin—which is a mostly prose essay on how a sage ruler can apply the meditation techniques to governing—is considered the latest work in the group. Three types of evidence support the antiquity of the Neiye. First, its distinctive literary structure as a composition of originally independent, rhythmic and rhymed verse is a sign of oral transmission before literacy became widespread in the latter half of the 4th century BCE. Second, the Neiye does not contain the kind of sustained argumentation typically found in 3rd-century BCE philosophical essays, and it shows only a loose principle of organization between its verses. Third, the absence of the correlative cosmology of yin and yang and the Five Phases, characteristic of 3rd-century BCE texts. Using redaction criticism – analyzing the production a text from how the redactors (editors, compilers) combined and arranged the source materials – Roth found that the Xinshu II is an original prose essay in which the redactor deliberately extracted and rearranged Neiye verses for the purpose of advocating the political benefits of inner cultivation methods. It thus complements Xinshu I and accounts for the Guanzi labeling them as parts of one essay.

More specifically, Roth proposes that the Neiye's exclusively verse format and absence of political thought would support a date of mid-4th century BCE at the latest. The first part of Xinshu I contains verses that are almost as old, but since they begin to advocate applying inner cultivation techniques to the task of governing and show evidence of interaction with rival intellectual positions, he dates them to about 300 BCE. The commentary contained in the second part of Xinshu I shows the influence of the Daodejing and so must be dated to a later time after this work became influential in intellectual circles about 250 BCE.

A 45-character inscription on a Warring States era jade artifact may possibly be an earlier record of breath meditation than the Neiye. This rhymed passage entitled xingqi (行氣; "circulating the vital breath") was inscribed on a dodecagonal block of jade, with nine trisyllabic phrases describing the stages of breath cultivation. While the dating is uncertain, estimates range from earlier than 400 BCE (Joseph Needham), 380 BCE (Guo Moruo), to late 4th century BCE (Harper). In any case, some scholars claim that it contains the earliest Chinese epigraphical evidence on the practice of breath meditation.

== Basic concepts ==
The ancient Neiye presents a "seamless web … connecting the psychological, physiological, and spiritual aspects of the human being". It is the earliest known text that explains self-cultivation through daily, practiced regulation of a group of life forces. Namely, qi "vital energy" (the universal force that gives life to all things), jing "vital essence" (one's innate reservoir of qi), xin "heart-mind", shen "spirit; spiritual consciousness", dao "the Way", and de "inner power". These terms later became keywords in Chinese philosophy, but the Neiye sometimes used them idiosyncratically, for instance, dao was effectively interchangeable with shen and qi.

Qi, which Roth translates as "vital energy" or "vital breath", integrates the physical with the psychological. Kirkland describes qi "life-energy" in the Neiye as "a powerful salubrious reality" that is present everywhere and within all things. According to the Neiye, human beings are made up of systems containing various manifestations of qi; the wǔzàng (五臟) Five Orbs/Viscera system includes not only the physical organs (lungs, kidneys, liver, gallbladder, and spleen), but also the psychological range of mental and emotional states—presciently similar to the contemporary idea of neural correlates for consciousness.

Jing "vital essence" is a central concept in the Neiye, with meanings that span from the universal life-giving essence contained in all creatures to the particular physiological substrate that allows sages to achieve profound tranquility. Within each person, qi energy is centered in the jing essence, which Roth describes as "the source of the vital energy in human beings [and] the basis of our health, vitality, and psychological well-being". Verse 8 provides the following clear equation: "The vital essence [精; jing]: it is the essence [精] of the vital energy [氣; qi]." Thus, it is concentrated and subtle form of vital energy.

The original meaning of jing (written 精 with the "rice radical" 米) "finest and purest rice" was a religious concept. Pure and refined things were considered as the "stuff of spirits; quintessence; essence", referring either to sacrificial offerings suitable for the gods/spirits or the potency of the spirits themselves. In later usage jing came to mean "germinal essence; energy that nourishes the human body; vitality". Harper translates this term both as "essence" and "specter, spectral" in the Neiye.

The two most important philosophical concepts in the "Neiye" are the closely related notions of the vital essence and the Way. The power of the Way to generate all things is manifested as the vital essence, which is the procreative principle within all phenomena. The first lines of the text compare heavenly and earthly jing.

The vital essence of all things:
It is this that brings them to life.
It generates the five grains below
And becomes the constellated stars above.
When flowing amid the heavens and earth,
We call it ghostly and numinous.
When stored within the chests of human beings,
We call them sages.

By storing jing within the heart/mind, one can become sagely. The sage's cultivation does not occur only at the spiritual level but rather sets into motion physiological changes, causing the human body to become thoroughly transformed and renewed.

Xin "heart; mind" is regularly translated by Roth as "mind" with a concrete connotation of not just the physical "heart" but also the entire sphere of vital energy that flows through it. The xin is described as the ruling agency in an individual's "biospiritual nexus, i.e., in the entire personal complex of body/mind/heart/spirit". The 'xin can become agitated by excessive thought or emotion, which leads to dissipation of one's jing (精; "vital essence"), and can result in sickness and death. To preserve health and vitality, the Neiye says that jing (靜; "stabilizing; calming") the xin will draw in the external realities of shen and dao.

Shen is usually translated as English "spirit; spiritual", but in order to avoid the connotative ambiguities of spirit, Roth uses "numen; numinous" in reference to a layer of mystical awareness that lies within the human body. Shen comprises perception, cognition, and higher forms of awareness. The original meaning of shen "god; spirit; deity" was also a religious concept. External spirits were believed to occasionally descend to human beings (particularly shamans), or humans could draw them down with the power of de "inner power; virtue".

Verse 13 describes the aspects of shen "numen; numinous":

There is a numinous [mind] naturally residing within [有神自在身];
One moment it goes, the next it comes,
And no one is able to conceive of it.
If you lose it you are inevitably disordered;
If you attain it you are inevitably well ordered.
Diligently clean out its lodging place [敬除其舍]
And its vital essence will naturally arrive [精將自來].
Still your attempts to imagine and conceive of it.
Relax your efforts to reflect on and control it.
Be reverent and diligent
And its vital essence will naturally stabilize.
Grasp it and don't let go
Then the eyes and ears won't overflow
And the mind will have nothing else to seek.
When a properly aligned mind resides within you [正心在中],
The myriad things will be seen in their proper perspective.

Verse 14 describes this shen "numinous [mind]" as a nondual awareness of the Way: "Within the mind there is yet another mind. / That mind within the mind: it is an awareness that precedes words." This statement means the mind can be divided into two levels: empirical and transcendent. The former awaits transformation by the latter. The Neiye's privately practiced meditation, in which the shen settles into the practitioner's body, directly descends from the trance of the professional wu "shaman; spirit medium".

Dao "the Way" is a well-known Chinese loanword in English meaning "an absolute entity which is the source of the universe" (OED), but the ancient Neiye sometimes used it as an equivalent of the qi, jing, and shen that a practitioner works to cultivate. The 'Neiye describes the Way as a force that can enter or leave a person, and by engaging in specific self-cultivation practices one can make it come into direct experience or can keep it from going away.

Clear! as though right by your side.
Vague! as though it will not be attained.
Indiscernible! as though beyond the limitless.
The test of this is not far off:
Daily we make use of its inner power [de 德].
The Way is what infuses the body,
Yet people are unable to fix it in place.
It goes forth but does not return,
It comes back but does not stay.
Silent! none can hear its sound.
Suddenly stopping! it abides within the mind.
Obscure! we do not see its form.
Surging forth! it arises with us.
We do not see its form,
We do not hear its sound,
Yet we can perceive an order to its accomplishments.
We call it "the Way."

Thus, the term dao refers to a transient reality that a person needs to attract and to retain. The Neiye warns that forceful efforts cannot make the dao arrive or stay, only one's de "inner power" (see below) can attract it and other life forces.

Neiye verse 4 above depicts the Way as the ineffable cosmic power familiar from other early Daoist texts like the Daodejing, yet it has a much more tangible presence in the Neiye. Verse 5 says the Way is a constantly moving power that seems to come and go within the human mind.

The Way has no fixed position;
It abides within the excellent mind [善心].
When the mind is tranquil and the vital breath is regular [心靜氣理],
The Way can thereby be halted.
That Way is not distant from us;
When people attain it they are sustained
That Way is not separated from us;
When people accord with it they are harmonious.
Therefore: Concentrated! as though you could be roped together with it.
Indiscernible! as though beyond all locations.
The true state of that Way:
How could it be conceived of and pronounced upon?
Cultivate your mind, make your thoughts tranquil [修心靜意],
And the Way can thereby be attained.

Although constantly moving in and out of one's mind, the Way can stay within it when one cultivates tranquility through the regular and systematic practice of breathing meditation. While the Way is always present, one is aware of this presence within the mind only when it is properly cultivated.

De "inner power" is a basic concept in traditional Daoism meaning "inherent character; inner moral power; virtue; integrity", but the Neiye used de to mean the "acquisitional agency" through which one can receive qi, jing, shen, and dao. Thus, de "inner power" (which is cognate with 得; de; "get; acquire"), is something that we "acquire" when all elements of the body/heart/mind are peaceful and aligned. Unlike other Daoist classics such as the Daodejing and Zhuangzi that describe de as intrinsic to everyone, the Neiye says one should practice daily self-control of thoughts and actions in order to build up one's de. Inner power is a distinct quality of mental concentration that arises naturally, along with tranquility, through the practice of proper posture and breathing meditation.

When your body is not aligned [形不正],
The inner power will not come.
When you are not tranquil within [中不靜],
Your mind will not be well ordered.
Align your body, assist the inner power [正形攝德],
Then it will gradually come on its own.

This inner power can be thought of as a psychological condition of "focused and balanced awareness from which the adept is able to respond spontaneously and harmoniously to whatever arises".

"Neiye" physiological concepts developed in the intellectual background of the 4th century BCE, a period when Chinese philosophers, notably the ethical egoist Yang Zhu, first considered the question of maintaining one's own physical wellbeing. The chief innovation made in the "Neiye" is equating jing vital essence and qi vital breath/energy, which unites vital energy and essence with shen spirit/numen—thus naturalizing the old religious connotations of jing and shen into new physical meanings. This inventive physiological theory merged a person's physical and spiritual components, and made vital breath/energy the source of each. The "Neiye" opens with the statement that jing "vital essence" is the source of life. Then the text identifies the mind as the "lodging place for the vital essence", defines vital essence as the "essence of vital breath/energy", and links jing with the indwelling shen "spirit". De "inner power; virtue" serves as the mechanism by which the triad of vital energy, vital essence, and spirit are drawn to the body where they must be stored and concentrated in order to create a wellspring of vitality. The "Neiye" introduced the physiological theory that one could transform oneself into a sage through heartmind training that cultivates qi vital breath/energy, jing vital essence, and shen spirit/numen in the body.

From a modern perspective, these 2500-year-old Neiye concepts seem enigmatic; qi "vital breath" constitutes both matter and energy, while xin "body/heart/mind" or bodymind circumvents Cartesian dualism. Owing to a semantic gap in the English lexicon, there is no standard word denoting the ancient Chinese Neiye worldview that spiritual life involves activities that also have physical components. Suggested protologisms include "biospiritual", "physio-spiritual", "psychophysiological", and "psychospiritual.

According to the Neiye, there is a set of elusive life forces that enter and leave the human body, but will only remain within a person who has transformed him/herself into an efficient receptacle. For instance, "Cultivate your mind, make your thoughts tranquil, / And the Way can thereby be attained." (Verse 5), and "Diligently clean out [spirit's] lodging place / And its vital essence will naturally arrive." (13). Kirkland says a good analogy for these forces might be radio waves that continually flow through us but can only be utilized by a device that is properly tuned. Figuratively, we are all radios that were originally fully operational, but now are experiencing electromagnetic interference caused by excessive heart/mind activity, and we need to retune ourselves to eliminate the disturbance and begin functioning properly again.

== Practices ==
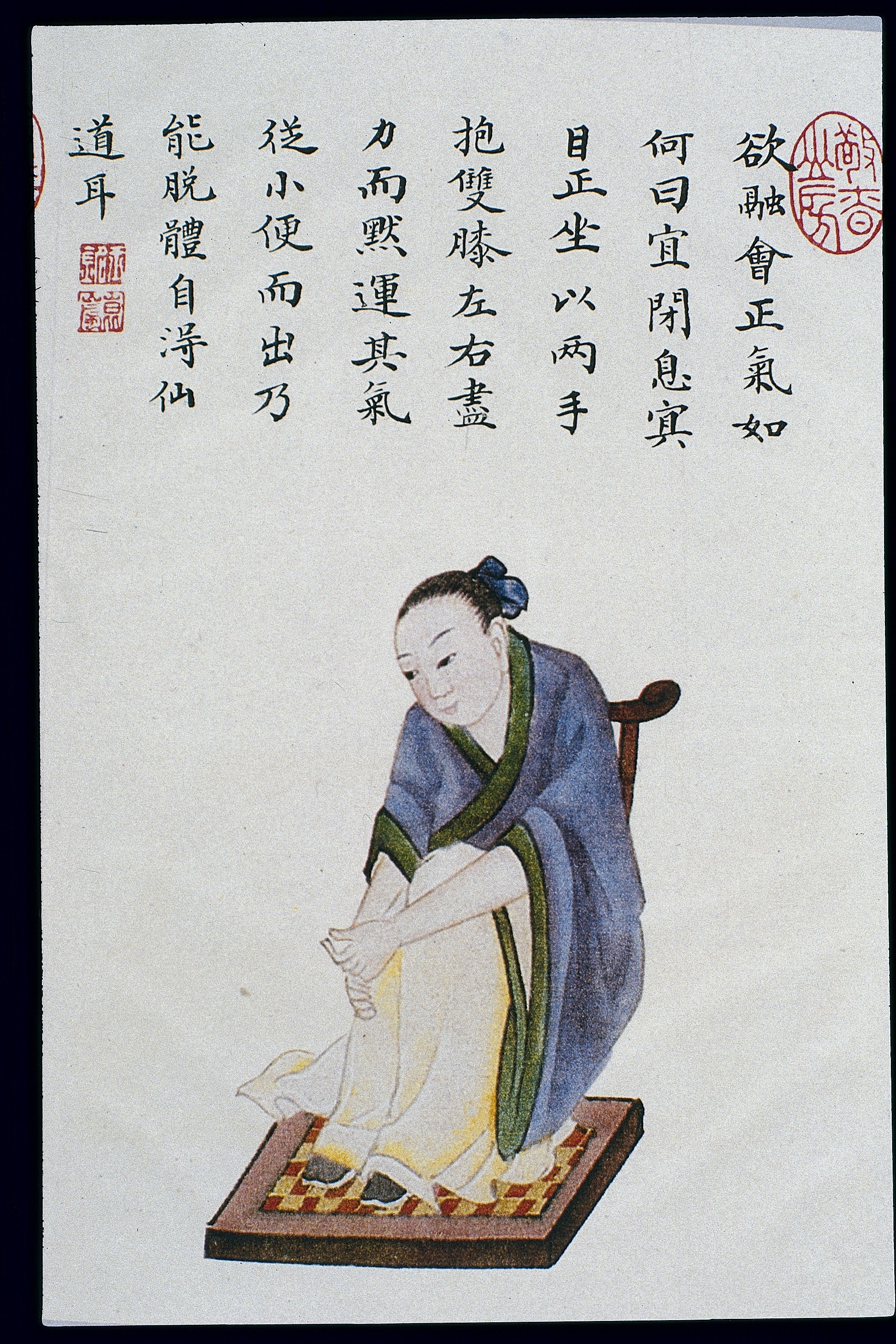
Qing dynasty illustration of modern Daoyin technique for zhengqi (正氣; "aligning the vital energy")

The Neiye acclaims a variety of practices and techniques for acquiring, or metaphorically "tuning in" to, the subtle forces of the Way. Basic daily practices include proper alignment of one's body/heart/mind, breath meditation, and moderation in thinking and eating.

Practicing zhèng (正; "alignment") of bodymind in order to attain jìng (靜; "tranquility") (cf. later jingzuo "tranquil sitting" meditation) is one of the most important aims in the Neiye, where the word zheng "to rectify; to square up; to center; to align" appears in 9 of the 26 verses and jing "still; quiet; calm; tranquil" in 11. "Fourfold Aligning" is the basic method of Neiye practice: zhengxing (正形; "aligning the body"), zhengsiti[zhi] (正四體[肢]; "aligning the four limbs"), zhengqi (正氣; "aligning the vital energy"), and zhengxin (正心; "aligning the mind"). Komjathy discusses this as the "Four Alignments." Since the human body is believed to be imbued with qi vital energy, the term zhengxing refers to aligning or harmonizing the flow of vital energy within the physical form (xing, while zhengxin refers to aligning the flow of vital energy within the mind.

"Aligning the body" and "aligning the four limbs" are closely related. The former appears in Verse 11 (above): "When your body is not aligned [形不正], / The inner power will not come. / When you are not tranquil within [中不靜], / Your mind will not be well ordered. / "Align your body, assist the inner power [正形攝德], / Then it will gradually come on its own." The latter alignment of arms and legs creates a figurative she (舍; "guest-house; lodging") for jing "vital essence" in Verse 8.

If you can be aligned and be tranquil [能正能靜],
Only then can you be stable.
With a stable mind at your core [定心在中],
With the eyes and ears acute and clear,
And with the four limbs firm and fixed [四枝堅固],
You can thereby make a lodging place for the vital essence [可以為精舍].
The vital essence: it is the essence of the vital energy.
When the vital energy is guided, it [the vital essence] is generated,
But when it is generated, there is thought,
When there is thought, there is knowledge,
But when there is knowledge, then you must stop.
Whenever the forms of the mind have excessive knowledge,
You lose your vitality.

In both these verses, being aligned precedes being tranquil, and thus developing a stabilized mind. Neiye "alignment" apparently refers to sitting in a steady posture with the limbs aligned or squared up with one another, comparable to the vajrasana posture in Buddhist meditation.

This Neiye metaphor of "make a lodging place for the vital essence" refers to the primary mystical praxis, which Verse 13 (above) symbolically describes, "Diligently clean out its [the bodily shen's] lodging place [敬除其舍] / And its vital essence will naturally arrive [精將自來]". The method of "cleaning out [chú (除; "eliminate; remove; clean out")] the lodging place of the numinous" is essentially an apophatic process in which one "gradually and systematically removes the normal feelings, desires, thoughts, and perceptions that commonly occupy consciousness".

Xinshu I repeats this Neiye metaphor: "The Tao is not far off, but it is hard to reach its limit. It rests together with man, but it is hard to grasp. Empty out your desires, and the numen will enter its abode. If the abode is not thoroughly swept clean, the numen will not remain there." It also adds recommendations to "open its doors" (the senses), "relinquish selfishness", and "stop talking" in order to give the practitioner shenming (神明; "numinous clarity").

Systematic breath meditation practices in the Neiye usually involve sitting in a stable position, circulating and refining the qi "vital breath", in order to produce concentrated jing "vital essence", which is thought of as the material counterpart of psychological tranquility. Since vital essence is expended in everyday activities such perceiving, thinking, and feeling, one should minimize them. Aligning the body and emptying the mind will maximize physical vitality and psychological well-being.

Neiye Verse 24 describes breath meditation practice in which the adept shouyi (守一; "maintains the One") and yunqi (運氣; "revolves the qi"), which brings about a profound tranquility.

When you enlarge your mind and let go of it,
When you relax your vital breath and expand it,
When your body is calm and unmoving:
And you can maintain the One and discard the myriad disturbances.
You will see profit and not be enticed by it,
You will see harm and not be frightened by it.
Relaxed and unwound, yet acutely sensitive,
In solitude you delight in your own person.
This is called "revolving the vital breath":
Your thoughts and deeds seem heavenly.

Roth says this ancient reference to shouyi, which later became a central tenet of Daoist and Chinese Buddhist meditation, describes a contemplative technique in which one sits calmly and exclusively concentrates on the Way, which enables one to set aside all the "disturbances of perceptions, thoughts, emotions, and desires that normally fill your conscious mind".

Verse 17 provides specific details about regularized breath meditation. Breathing is said to "coil and uncoil" (周; zhōu; "encircle; surround" and 寬; kuān; "let go; release; stretch out; extend") or "contract and expand" (密; mì; "snug; condense; squeezed together" and 舒; shū; "stretch; spread out; expand; unfold"), with coiling/contracting referring to exhalation and uncoiling/expanding to inhalation.

For all [to practice] this Way:
You must coil, you must contract,
You must uncoil, you must expand,
You must be firm, you must be regular [in this practice].
Hold fast to this excellent [practice]; do not let go of it.
Chase away the excessive; abandon the trivial.
And when you reach its ultimate limit
You will return to the Way and its inner power.

In addition to discussing mystical transformation through vital breath circulation, the Neiye recommends moderation in thought and diet so that the vital energy can flow freely and harmony can be achieved. For instance,

Deep thinking generates knowledge.
Idleness and carelessness generate worry.
Cruelty and arrogance generate resentment.
Worry and grief generate illness.
When illness reaches a distressing degree, you die.
When you think about something and don't let go of it,
Internally you will be distressed, externally you will be weak.
Do not plan things out in advance
Or else your vitality will cede its dwelling.
In eating, it is best not to fill up;
In thinking, it is best not to overdo.
Limit these to the appropriate degree
And you will naturally reach it [vitality].

The Neiye also discusses common health concerns such as the "way of eating".

For all the Way of eating [食之道] is that:
Overfilling yourself with food will impair your vital energy
And cause your body to deteriorate.
Overrestricting your consumption causes the bones to wither
And the blood to congeal.
The mean between overfilling and overrestricting:
This is called "harmonious completion."
It is where the vital essence lodges
And knowledge is generated. ...

These holistic descriptions of harmonizing body, mind, and spirit are early references to the practice later called yǎngshēng 養生 "nourishing one's vital principle".

== Influences ==
The c. 4th-century BCE Neiye had long-reaching effects on Daoism and Chinese culture. It influenced classic texts such as the Daodejing and Zhuangzi, as well as what later became Daoist meditation, Neidan "internal alchemy", Daoyin, and Daoist diet practices. It also influenced theories about the Three Treasures (精氣神; jīng-qì-shén; "essence, vital energy, and spirit") in traditional Chinese medicine, and may have impacted the Confucian teachings of Mencius (c. 372-c. 289 BCE) about cultivating the xin "heartmind".

=== Daoism ===
The Neiye had a unique position in the history of Chinese philosophy. Compared with other Hundred Schools of Thought texts from the Warring States period (475–221 BCE), the Neiye does not mention many basic philosophical theories such as yin and yang. The text is unconcerned with political philosophy; unlike the Daodejing, which contains many passages discussing the problems involved with ruling a state. Nor does the Neiye criticize Confucianism, as the Daodejing and Zhuangzi frequently do. The Neiye contains no evidence that its authors or compilers were aware of the teachings from other current philosophical traditions, neither Confucianism, Mohism, Legalism, nor the School of Yin Yang.

Another distinctive feature of the Neiye is that it lacks the early Chinese idea of Tian "Heaven" as a beneficent agency overseeing and guiding life. Both the Confucians and the Mohists shared ideas about Tian Heaven as the divine ruler and the Tianzi Son of Heaven as the earthly ruler. The character 天; tian appears in a number of Neiye passages, in which Roth translates it in the naturalistic sense as "the heavens" (for instance, "Bright!—as if ascending the heavens", Verse 2 above) rather than the usual deified "Heaven".

To illustrate the c. 4th-century BCE Neiye's effects on early Daoism, examples are given below from the c. 3rd-century BCE Daodejing and the c. 3rd/2nd-century BCE Zhuangzi.

The Neiye and Daodejing have parallels as well as differences. Both texts contain teachings that originated in an oral tradition. The Neiye, like much of the Daodejing, is primarily composed in rhymed verse, and some scholars believe that certain sections may have been borrowed from an early Daoist hymn. Harper suggests both texts were "canons of physical cultivation theory" meant for recitation by initiates who could have received fuller knowledge of its meaning either orally or in supplementary texts.

Both texts also share a conception of Dao "the Way" as the ultimate power through which everything generates and develops. Compare how they describe the Way and the wanwu (萬物; "myriad things"): "The myriad things are generated by it" and "The myriad things are completed by it" (Neiye verse 6) and "The Way gives birth to them, nourishes them, matures them, completes them, rests them, rears them, supports them, and protects them" (Daodejing chapter 51). Both texts also similarly describe the concept of de "inner power". In the Neiye (verses 4 and 2), de is the aspect of the Way that we "daily make use of" and which we develop through refining the qi vital breath into the jing vital essence through breath meditation. The Daodejing (chapter 55) also links de and jing comparing one "who is filled with an abundance of inner power" with the newborn babe in whom the vital essence is maximized. The Neijing's emphasis on the importance of attaining jing tranquility through breath meditation is also found in the Daodejing, where the term occurs in 7 of the 81 chapters, for instance, to "maintain tranquility is the central (practice)".

The most explicit Daodejing reference to practicing breath meditation contains three phrases with close parallels to the Neiye.

Amid the daily activity of the psyche, can you embrace the One and not depart from it?
When concentrating your vital breath until it is at its softest, can you be like a child?
Can you sweep clean your Profound Mirror so you are able to have no flaws in it?
In loving the people and governing the state, can you do it without using knowledge?
When the Gates of Heaven open and close, can you become feminine?
In clarifying all within the Four Directions, can you do it without using knowledge?

First, this Daodejing term baoyi (抱一; "embracing the One") parallels the Neiye zhiyi (執一; "hold fast to the One"), and both terms refer to retaining a sense of union with the Way in everyday life. Second, zhuanqi (專氣; "concentrating the vital breath (until it is at its softest)") closely resembles tuanqi (摶氣; "concentrating your vital breath (as if numinous)") denoting to the practice of breath meditation. Combining the Daodejing and Neiye passages and explicitly critiquing Roth's theory of "breath meditation," Louis Komjathy suggests that both phrases rather point towards a larger Daoist "energetics of being and experiencing" that informs and is informed by Daoist apophatic and quietistic (emptiness-/stillness-based) meditation. Third, dichu xuanjian (滌除玄覽; "sweep clean your Profound Mirror") and the distinctive Neiye metaphor jingchu qi she (敬除其舍; "diligently clean out its lodging place") share the same syntax and verb chu "eliminate; remove". These three textual counterparts demonstrate that the redactors of both the Neiye and Daodejing shared knowledge of traditional proto-Daoist meditation techniques through which one could directly experience the Way and its inner power.

Notwithstanding these similarities and parallels, there are significant differences between the two texts. As already mentioned, the Neiye contains virtually no political philosophy, which is a major focus in the Daodejing. There is no trace in the Neiye of many now-famous themes of the Daodejing, such as wu "non-being", ziran "naturally; spontaneously", wuwei "non-interference", pu "uncarved; unhewn", xian "transcendent; immortal", and xu (虛; "emptiness"). Unlike the Daodejing gender-based concepts of the Dao as mother, the Mysterious Female, and "feminine" behaviors such as humility or yielding, the Neiye has nothing to say about gender, which hints that women as well as men may have engaged in mediation practices.

In addition, the authors/compilers of the Zhuangzi were clearly familiar with Neiye inner cultivation practices. The Zhuangzi text contains both weak and strong evidence of meditation techniques shared with the Neiye. Some passages contain similar terminology and others use sentences that are almost identical with those in the Neiye. Here are two examples.

In the first passage, the character Wearcoat (被衣) instructs Gnaw Gap (齧缺) about the Way.

You must align your body [正汝形],
Unify your vision,
And the heavenly harmony will arrive.
Gather in your knowledge,
Unify your attention,
And the numinous will enter its lodging place [神將來舍],
The inner power will beautify you,
And the Way will reside in you.
You will see things with the eyes of a newborn calf
And will not seek out their precedents.

Zhengxing (正形; "aligning the body") is a basic Neiye practice, and jing chu qi she (敬除其舍; "cleaning out the lodging place of the numinous") resembles this shen jianglai she (神將來舍; "the numinous will enter its lodging place").

In the second Zhuangzi passage, Laozi instructs Nanrong Zhu (南榮趎) about meditation practices by paraphrasing, if not quoting, the Neiye.

The practice for guarding vitality [衛生之經]:
Can you embrace the One [能抱一乎]?
Can you not lose it [能勿失乎]?
Can you not resort to divining by tortoise or milfoil [能無卜筮]?
Yet know good and bad fortune [而知吉凶乎]?
Can you be still? Can you cease [能止乎能已乎]?
Can you quit (seeking for) it in others [能舍諸人]
And seek for within yourself [而求諸己乎]?
Can you be casual?
Can you be naive?
Can you be like a child?
The child howls all day but its throat does not become hoarse.

These Zhuangzi instructions are an almost verbatim repetition of Neiye Verse 19.

By concentrating your vital breath as if numinous,
The myriad things will all be contained within you.
Can you concentrate? Can you unite with them [能一乎]?
Can you not resort to divining by tortoise or milfoil [能無卜筮]?
Yet know bad and good fortune [而知吉凶乎]?
Can you stop? Can you cease [能止乎能已乎]?
Can you not seek it in others [能勿求諸人]?,
Yet attain it within yourself [而得之己乎]? ...

Based upon the remarkable correspondences between these contexts, the authors of this Zhuangzi chapter were unquestionably familiar with the Neiye or a similar text.

The contents of the Neiye are distinct from either the Daodejing or the Zhuangzi, despite the striking similarities among the texts. Since the Neiye was written earlier than the Daodejing, Kirkland proposes that it could be interpreted as an example of the earliest known Daoist teachings. Since the compilers of the Daodejing were clearly interested in the same social and political issues that concerned members of other philosophical schools, one could reasonably characterize the teachings of the Neiye as "original Daoism," and the teachings of the Daodejing as "applied Daoism." Although both texts apparently developed from the same general tradition, the Neiye compilers were primarily interested in self-cultivation practices, the Daodejing compilers were also interested in the broader issues of living in human society.

=== Mencius ===
There is evidence that the Neiye also influenced the teachings of Mencius (c. 370-c. 290 BCE) on cultivating the xin heartmind and building up qi, which later developed into Neo-Confucian ideals of self-cultivation. In the Mencius, Mencius tells his disciple Gongsun Chou 公孫丑, "At forty, I attained to an unperturbed mind [budong xin 不動心]" adding that attaining it is not difficult and another disciple Gaozi achieved it at a younger age. Mencius also says, "I am good at nourishing my flood-like ch'i [haoran zhi qi 浩然之氣]". When asked what that means, he explains,

A hard thing to speak of. It is the sort of ch'i which is utmost in vastness, utmost in firmness. If by uprightness you nourish it and do not interfere with it, it stuffs the space between heaven and earth. It is the sort of ch'i which matches the right with the Way; without these it starves. It is generated by accumulation of rightdoing, it is not that by sporadic rightdoing one makes a grab at it. If anything in conduct is dissatisfying to the heart it starves. That is why I say that [Gaozi] has never understood the right, because he thinks it external. There must be work for it, but do not adjust its course; do not let your heart forget it, but do not help it to grow.

Mencius's description of a sage's qi vital energy as haoran (浩然; "flood-like") was likely taken from this Neiye passage:

For those who preserve and naturally generate vital essence
On the outside a calmness will flourish.
Stored inside, we take it to be the well spring.
Floodlike, it harmonizes and equalizes [浩然和平]
And we take it to be the fount of the vital energy.

Graham dates the Neiye from the 4th century BCE, and says its practices may predate the hypothetical split between Confucianism and Daoism.

Another Neiye-Mencius' textual parallel exists between "By concentrating your vital breath as if numinous, / The myriad things will all be contained within you [摶氣如神萬物備存]." and "Mencius said, 'The myriad things are all here at my disposal in myself [萬物皆備於我矣]. There is no greater joy than to look back into oneself and find integrity'."

Both the Neiye and Mencius assume that one is born with an inherently perfect heartmind, and when one becomes confused that perfection is lost, but one can return to the original state of heart/mind by allowing an inherent harmony to replace the confusion. Kirkland reasons that since these ideas seem more integral to the teachings of the Neiye, it is logical to conclude that the ideas, if not the text itself, may have been known to Mencius or at least to his text's compilers.

=== Excavated texts ===
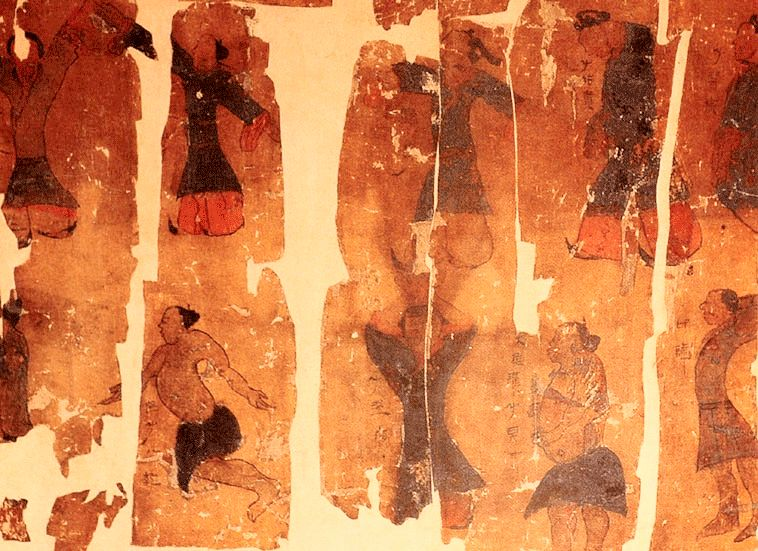
Portion of the Daoyintu Drawings of Guiding and Pulling in the Mawangdui Silk Texts

The c. 4th century BCE Neiye is connected with a corpus of 2nd century BCE medical and physical cultivation texts that archaeologists discovered in Western Han dynasty tombs. The c. 168 BCE Mawangdui Silk Texts, excavated in 1973 near Changsha, Hunan, include several previously-unknown medical texts, such as the Wushi'er Bingfang "Recipes for Fifty-Two Ailments" and Shiwen (十問; "Ten Questions"). The c. 186 BCE Zhangjiashan Han bamboo texts, excavated in 1983 near Linyi, Hubei, include additional writings on medicine and health. One of the most widely known Mawangdui silk texts is the Daoyintu (導引圖; "Drawings of Guiding and Pulling") that illustrates 44 sitting and standing daoyin exercises.

The psychophysiological cultivation practices in the Neiye and the Mawangdui and Zhangjiashan texts have numerous parallels. They share technical vocabulary for breath cultivation, particularly the three basic elements of human physiology: qi vital energy, jing vital essence, and shen spirit. The texts also similarly describe circulating the vital energy in a stable, sitting posture with the spine erect. Furthermore, the Neiye and the Mawangdui Four Texts manuscript share a rhyme scheme associated with the state of Chu, and contain identical passages, thus indicating "an affinity that is too close to be a matter of chance".

However, the Neiye and the excavated texts give different purposes for practicing inner cultivation. The Mawangdui and Zhangjiashan manuscripts are primarily concerned with goals of better health and longer life; although the Neiye occasionally mentions the physical benefits of breath cultivation, its goals are more psychological and spiritual. For example, the Mawangdui text that most closely resembles the Neiye is the Shiwen Ten Questions. While both mention tuanqi (摶氣; "concentrating your vital breath"), it is done in order to attain the Way in the Neiye but to achieve longevity in the Shiwen. Both texts describe jing as being like a quanyuan (泉原; "wellspring"), but in the Neiye vital essence is generated in order to attain tranquility, while in the Shiwen it is generated by "sucking in vital energy" and circulating it into the extremities.

Unlike the "Neiye" that discourses on philosophical and mystical concepts of human physiology, the Mawangdui and Zhangjiashan texts focus on teaching practical techniques for bodily care and long life. Based on the "Neiye" text, Harper thinks that Warring States cultivation theory and practice was an esoteric tradition with few actual practitioners. The Mawangdui and Zhangjiashan texts suggest that physical cultivation was popular in the 3rd and 2nd centuries BCE. While the excavated texts do not mention how many people practiced the techniques and recipes, the literature was clearly available and represented a kind of "baseline macrobiotic hygiene for the elite".
