= Zhang Junfang (poet) =

Tang dynasty poet

Zhang Junfang (Chinese: 張君房, fl. 7th century) was a Tang dynasty poet. A native of Nanyang, Henan, he flourished as a poet under the reigns of the Emperors Taizong and Gaozong.
