= Jing zuo =

Meditation practice

Jing zuo (Chinese: 靜坐; lit. 'quiet sitting') refers to the Neo-Confucian meditation practice advocated by Zhu Xi and Wang Yang-ming. Jing zuo can also be described as a form of spiritual self-cultivation that helps a person achieve a more fulfilling life ("6-Great Traditions").

== Terminology ==
The term Jing zuo simply means 'sitting quietly'. The collocation soon acquired more specific meanings, referring to methods of quiet sitting that were practiced for medical or spiritual purposes. In early sources, such as the philosophical work Hanfeizi in the 3rd century BCE, Jing zuo seems to have been mainly understood as being a health benefit, but some centuries later spiritual practices were also referred to using this term. At the outset, it was not limited to Confucianism, but could equally be used about Buddhist and Daoist practices. The term became widely used in the Song dynasty and became the preferred term for seated meditation among Neo-Confucians, who tended to avoid more narrowly Buddhist or Daoist terms. In modern Western parlance, it often refers specifically to Neo-Confucian forms of meditation, but it is also used for other religious and non-religious practices.

== Confucian meditation and Buddhist meditation ==
The concept of meditation was not a major aspect of the Confucian life until the Neo-Confucian era. At this time Buddhism and Daoism had begun to expand into China and started to influence some aspects of Chinese culture. Even though there are some similarities, there are also some fundamental differences. Confucian meditation, unlike Daoist and Buddhist meditation, does not require the stopping of rational thought but instead relies upon disciplined attention to one's current situation and mental phenomena. Its purpose is to develop an individual to find full realization. (Johnston 2006) As Zhu Xi notes in [Reflections on Things at Hand]: "Whenever you have to attend to your daily affairs or undertake any matter, always spend some time in meditation and everything will be all right" (Zhu Xi, 4:25). There is a fundamental difference between Neo-Confucian and Buddhist or Daoist meditation, in respect to Jing zuo (quiet sitting). "Neo-Confucians argued that quiet sitting was oriented to this world and aimed at perfecting one's self, whereas Buddhist and Daoist meditation focused on forgetting the world and abandoning one's self." (Yao 2000, p. 222). Furthermore, "Neo-Confucian scholars take quiet sitting (Jing zuo) to be only a way to help understand one's gain in self-cultivation and they do not see it as a means to isolate oneself from human affairs. They believe that it is only within this world and among worldly affairs that one can progress in the path of spiritual cultivation." (Yao 2000, p. 223).

== Significant figures in Confucian meditation ==
There are two central concepts and schools of thought when it comes to Jing zuo. The two schools of thought were started by Zhu Xi (Chu Hsi) and Wang Yang-Ming. Each individual took a different approach; most would say an opposing approach. Here, each approach is examined separately.

=== Zhu Xi ===
Zhu Xi was very influential in the Rational School of thought. Zhu Xi's concept of li was that it is the constitution of all things, the way by which the world runs its course. This way of thinking and looking at li, when applied to Jing zuo, was that a person needed to combine both thinking and action to achieve enlightenment. Investigation of things and the world around you were very important aspects and teachings of Zhu Xi. "He also believed that knowledge and action always required each other."(Yao, p 220). According to Zhu Xi, to achieve enlightenment, an individual must actively seek knowledge, investigate ideas/events, meditate upon them, and then investigate some more. "According to this understanding, spiritual meditation is like a circular journey of tranquility and activity, or of preserving the mind and investigating the principle, or of knowledge and action." (Yao, p 220). For Zhu Xi, Jing zuo "does not mean to 'sit still like a blockhead, with the ear hearing nothing, the eye seeing nothing, and the mind thinking of nothing."(Yao p 220). It meant actively searching out, investigating, and exploring the world that a person lives in.

=== Wang Yangming ===
Wang Yangming was very influential in the Idealistic School of thought. Wang Yang-Ming disagreed with the approach that Zhu Xi had towards quiet sitting. His concept of li was that it is inside every person, and reflection on li, which is manifested in you, is the only way to enlightenment. Wang Yang-Ming believed that "it was right to search for sagehood within and there was no need to seek it in things and affairs outside. Self-examination and inward exploration are enough for one to gain true knowledge and to be a sage." (Yao, p 221). Even though Wang Yang-Ming thought quiet sitting would be useful for his students, he did not want it to be the only thing that they tried to accomplish. Quiet sitting was only good if it would help them grow in virtue and learn/reflect on how they, as a moral person, should grow.

== Purpose ==
It is said that those who practice Jing zuo can "perceive the pristine ethical basis of human nature" and also be able to "grasp the essential emptiness of everything." (Johnston 2000). The neo-Confucians were also using Jing zuo as a method of "practical retreat" to grow and develop as individuals. This included spiritual growth as well as the personal improvement and full realization of the practitioner (Johnston 2000). It allows Confucians to practice veneration for the basic human nature and it allows them to "nourish the seeds of moral virtue" (Berthrong 1998). Meditation embodies the state of serenity and calmness, where the practitioner can free themselves from and/or become unaffected by their surroundings. They can clear and settle the heart-mind completely and are then able to assess their knowledge in an open-minded and unbiased manner (Wilson 1991): "The Master said, 'Hui is capable of occupying his whole mind for three months on end with no thought but that of Goodness. The others can do so, some for a day, some even for a month, but that is all.'" (Analects 6.5) Jing zuo is said to be the "complement to prayer" (Wilson 1991) because "While prayer directs the heart to Ultimate Reality as a transcendent object, meditation cleanses the heart of all finite objects which obscure Reality so that its ultimate point may be found within." (Wilson 1991). Both prayer and Jing zuo are practiced and are essential parts of Confucian spirituality.

Jing zuo is understood to complement Zhu Xi's dictum to "investigate things" (to penetrate the principle (li) of the cosmos):

Choose what is good and firmly hold onto it. If we extend our knowledge and investigate the phenomena of things then this is choosing what is good. If we make our thoughts sincere, maintain an upright mind, and cultivate ourselves, this is firmly holding on. These two principles are all that we need.

— Zhu Xi, 2:17

For some, the reflection and meditation of Jing zuo must be balanced with studying the Confucian texts. It is beneficial when Jing zuo is used alongside Confucian scholarship, as it causes the Confucian to "center the self in service to others." (Berthrong 1998). Confucius himself advised against spending too much time sitting quietly and reflecting, stressing the fact that Confucians should find a balance in their lives where they would study and reflect upon what one studies equally (Stanford Encyclopedia of Philosophy, n.d.): "'He who learns but does not think is lost. He who thinks but does not learn is in great danger.' (Lunyu 2.15)" (Stanford Encyclopedia of Philosophy, n.d.).

== Forms of meditation ==
"The Confucian transformation model starts with individual meditation and goes through personal enhancement, self-discipline, personality integrity, family integration, state governance, and reaches the excellence of universal commonwealth". To achieve personal meditation, "one must learn to rest the energy (chu chu) to be stabilized (ting), be still and calm (ching), reach peace (an) and be mindful (li)". To have mindful energy, one must be "ready to learn the truth and reveal the virtue (te)".

One form of meditation is personal meditation Qigong. Qigong is when 'one sits still and frees their own character in order to get in touch with their true or real self.'. Qigong "is a process of training the mind, body, and spirit with the aim of guiding ones thoughts so that they can prepare for further development. It aims to internalize and calm the energy (qi) and to calm the mind, body and spirit". Another component is to desire and "reach a peaceful state so that one can become a thoughtful person to themselves and others" around them through practicing qigong.

Another form of Confucian meditation is called Chou Won. "Chou means to sit and Won means to forget one's self ". The person simply sits, "lets go and allows God to work". (Wilson 1991). Chou Wong's main focus is to "detach the character from one's self and reach mental freedom". This form of Confucian meditation is "important because it teaches the practitioner many things to do with one's self: self-awareness, self-enhancement, self-discipline, and self-actualization as well as learning how to find the truth and create social change".

The "mental processes aim to rejuvenate internal virtue that leads to the insight of real self-awareness and universal energy interconnection". The main focus of these meditations is to "aim to incorporate mind, body and spirit for healing with the three main goals; disease prevention, healing, and human capacity development". Confucian meditation is used as "an empowerment tool for the Confucians and their family members by teaching them stress management, personal enhancement, family integration and career development".

== Influence on Confucian society ==
Both schools of thought, Zhu Xi and Wang Yangming, influenced Confucian society. Both schools edited and rewrote different aspects of Confucian volumes and texts, tried to clarify concepts and ideas of Confucianism, and helped to develop the spiritual dimension of Confucians. Furthermore, both saw that it was very important to try to be a moral person; developing wisdom, loyalty, filial piety, compassion for humanity, and propriety; they lead to better morals in society in general. Confucian Meditation from the Great Learning

"The Way of learning to be great consists in manifesting the clear character, loving the people, and abiding in the highest good. Only after knowing what to abide in can one be calm. Only after having been calm can one be tranquil. Only after having achieved tranquility can one have peaceful repose. Only after having peaceful repose can one begin to deliberate. Only after deliberation can the end be attained. Things have their roots and their branches. Affairs have their beginnings and their ends. To know what is first and what is last will lead one near the Way." (Wilson 1991)

== See also ==
- Zazen
- Zuowang

== Works cited ==
- 6-Great Traditions. Retrieved October 20, 2008
- Berthrong, John H. (1998). Transformations of the Confucian Way. Westview Press.
- Johnston, William M. (2000). Monasticism: Volume 1 A-L. London, Fitzroy, Dearborn Publishers.
- Riegel, Jeffrey. (n.d.) Confucius. In The Stanford Encyclopedia of Philosophy online. Retrieved October 23, 2008, from
- Wilson, Dr. Andrew (1991). World Scripture: A Comparative Anthology of Sacred Texts. New York: Paragon House Publishers. Retrieved October 22, 2008 from
- Wilson, Dr. Andrew (1991). World Scripture: A Comparative Anthology of Sacred Texts. New York: Paragon House Publishers. Retrieved October 22, 2008 from
- Wittenborn, Allen (1991). Zhu Xi Chu Hsi: Further Reflections on Things at Hand. Trans. and commentary by Allen Wittenborn. Lanham, MD: University of America Press.
- Yao, Xinzhong (2000). An Introduction to Confucianism. United Kingdom: Cambridge University Press.
