= Yunji Qiqian =

C. 1029 literary anthology

- Traditional Chinese: 雲笈七籤
- Simplified Chinese: 云笈七签
- Literal meaning: Cloudy Bookbag Seven Slips
Transcriptions
Standard Mandarin
- Hanyu Pinyin: Yúnjí qīqiān
- Wade–Giles: Yun-chi ch'i-ch'ien

The Yunji qiqian is a (c. 1029) anthology of the (1016) Taoist Canon, which the Taoist scholar-official Zhang Junfang compiled for Emperor Zhenzong of Song. The Yunji qiqian records many early Taoist texts that have been lost since the 11th century, and is an important resource for understanding medieval Taoism.

== History ==
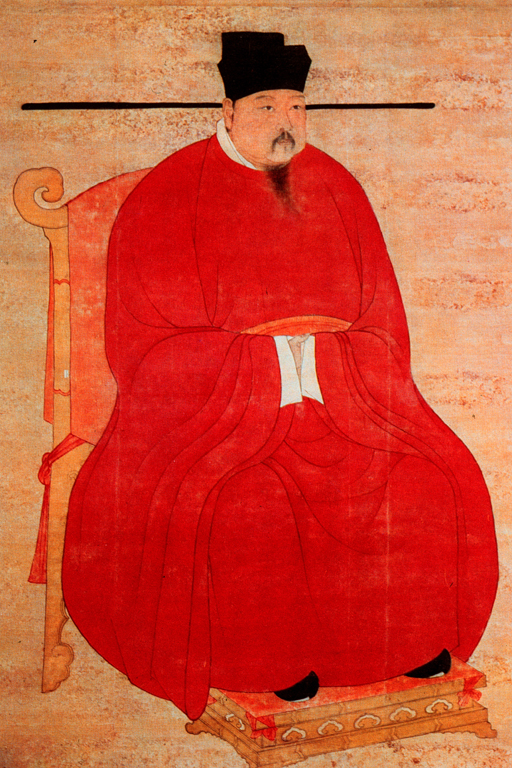
Emperor Zhenzong of Song.

The Yunji qiqian compendium was a "byproduct" of editing the 1016 edition Daozang "Taoist Canon" – the Da Song tiangong baozang 大宋天宮寳藏 "Great Song Celestial Palace Precious Canon". In 1012, the Northern Song Emperor Zhenzong (r. 997–1022) ordered the compilation of a revised and enlarged Canon. He put Chancellor Wang Qinruo in charge of the project, selected ten Taoist masters, and ordered Perfect Qi Guan 戚綸 to oversee the compilation of the Daozang. In 1016, the scholar-official Zhang Junfang (961?–1042?), who had replaced Qi Guan, completed the revised Da Song tiangong baozang edition, which comprised 4,565 juan 卷 "scrolls; volumes". In 1019, Zhang presented emperor Zhenzong with seven manuscript sets of the new Taoist Canon.

Zhang Junfang subsequently selected Canonical texts for the Yunji qiqian anthology, which he dedicated to Zhenzong, and presented to Emperor Renzong of Song (r. 1022–1063). Zhang's preface, dated circa 1028–1029, explains "[After having completed the Canon, I hence] selected the essentials of the seven sections of Taoist literature, in order to provide an imperfect treasury of the profound writings of various Taoist masters." Zhang submits the book to Zhenzong as a "bedside companion" (literally yiye zhi lan 乙夜之覽, "[for] perusal during the second watch [around 10 PM]").

== Title ==
The title uses the common Chinese words yun 雲 "cloud" and qi 七 "seven" with the Classical Chinese terms ji 笈 "bamboo box used for travelling (esp. to carry books); book box; satchel" and qian 籤 "bamboo slip; book marker; lot (used for divination); oracle" (both made from bamboo and written with the "bamboo radical" ⺮).

Zhang's preface explains that he chose among yunji qibu zhi ying 雲笈七部之英 "outstanding [books] from the seven components in the cloudy bookbag". Boltz explains that yunji is a "well-established poetic trope for a bagful of Taoist writings" and qibu refers to the sandong 三洞 "Three Caverns" and sibu 四部 "Four Supplements" into which the Canon was organized.

Translating the opaque Yunji qiqian title into English is difficult.

- "The Seven Bamboo Tablets of the Cloudy Satchel"
- "The Bookcase of the Clouds with the Seven Labels"
- "The Essentials or Outlines of the Seven Sections of the Taoist Canon"
- "Seven Lots from the Bookbag of the Clouds"
- "The Seven Tablets in a Cloudy Satchel"

An alternative name for the Yunji qiqian is xiao Daozang 小道藏 "little Daoist Canon".

== Contents ==
The received Yunji qiqian has 37 bu sections, 122 juan chapters (several of which are divided into two parts), and quotes more than 700 early Taoist texts. Zhang's preface mentions 120 juan; one explanation for the discrepancy is if the 122-chapter Ming edition came from compiling various 120-chapter Song editions.

In Chinese bibliographic terminology, the Yunji qiqian is classified as a leishu (reference work arranged by category; encyclopedia). English descriptions of the text include anthology, encyclopedia, handbook, and encyclopedic anthology.

Source materials come almost exclusively from Six Dynasties (220–589) and Tang dynasty (618–907) Taoist works. Many texts are quoted extensively, some are abridged, and others are made into new compositions. Lin suggests the text represents the "crystallization" of religious Taoism from the late Han to early Song periods.

Schipper describes the Yunji qiqian as a handbook to the mystical and yangsheng 養生 "nourishing life" Taoism of the Tang, and the religion of the poets Li Bai, Li Shangyin, and Han Yu, which "provides a key to the understanding of the arts and the literature of this period."

== Editions ==
The (1445) Ming dynasty edition Zhengtong daozang 正統道藏 "Zhengtong Emperor's Taoist Canon" contains the earliest known complete copy of the Yunji qiqian, which subsequent Canon editions reproduced. This Ming edition inconsistently uses alternate Chinese characters to avoid Song dynasty (960–1279) naming taboos, which "suggests that the editors of the Canon drew from a combination of editions in print or manuscript form". Such taboos were not observed in fragments of pages from the Yuan Canon of 1244.

Zhang Xuan 張萱 published a copy of the Yunji qiqian in 1609, and it was reproduced by the (1773–1782) Siku quanshu and (1919–1922) Sibu Congkan collections. The (1929) edition Sibu Congkan reproduced the superior copy in the Ming Canon, which was not marred by lacuna.

In the modern era, Kristofer Schipper compiled an index to the Yunji qiqian, and linguistic scholars at the Chinese Academy of Social Sciences produced a definitive edition.

== Problems ==
Schipper claimed the Yunji qiqian text had four problems, all of which Lin dismisses.

First, Schipper says Zhang's preface "surprisingly mentions Manichean works among those that entered into the compilation of the Canon," which has drawn the attentions of historians studying Manichaeism, but the actual Yunji qiqian "contains no identifiable Manichean material." Lin notes the preface "only mentioned that [Zhang] had "received" some Manichean scriptures when he was editing the Canon. He did not tell us whether those Manichean scriptures had been compiled into the Canon or not."

Second, Schipper notes that despite the title and preface, the Yunji qiqian "is not divided into seven parts; it does not even contain the slightest trace of such an arrangement." Lin cites Chen Guofu 陳國符 that the titular qiqian means "seven sections" of the Taoist Canon and not sections of the Yunji qiqian.

Third, Schipper says the most remarkable problem "is the total absence of the liturgical forms of Taoism", which are abundant in the 1016 Taoist Canon edited by Zhang. Since the Yunji qiqian does not contain any Daoist rituals for retreats, petitions, or memorials, and "it contains only the merest handful of talismans, charts, and diagrams", the present text "cannot be considered as an anthology of the Sung Canon." Comparing contents of the text's 37 bu 部 "sections" with the 12 bu of the Taoist Canon, Lin concludes that except for weiyi 威儀 "public rituals" and zhangbiao 章表 "petitions and memorials", the topics of the Yunji qiqian represent all the major features of Taoist literature.

Fourth, Schipper concludes that the received text, despite having underdone changes such as 120 to 122 juan, is probably descended from the original Yuynji qiqian. "It appears therefore impossible, at the present stage, to explain the discrepancies between the preface and the actual encyclopedia. But there are strong indications that the latter corresponds, by and large, to Chang's work."
