= Xin (heart-mind) =

Concept in Chinese philosophy

In Chinese philosophy and East Asian thought more generally, xin (Chinese: 心; pinyin: xīn, Vietnamese: tâm, Japanese: jin) refers to the "heart" and "mind". Translated directly, xin refers to the physical heart, though it also refers to the "mind" as the ancient Chinese believed the heart was the center of human cognition. However, emotion and reason were not considered as separate, but rather as coextensive; xin is as much cognitive as emotional, being simultaneously associated with thought and feeling. For these reasons, it is also often translated as "heart-mind". It has a connotation of intention, yet can be used to refer to long-term goals.

== Confucianism ==
Xunzi, an important early Confucian thinker, considered xin (心) to be cultivated during one's life, in contrast to innate qualities of xing (Chinese: 性; pinyin: xìng), or human nature.

== Daoism ==
A Daoist view described by Zhuang Zhou, describes xin (心) as being socialised, with environmental pressures influencing personal intentions, sometimes in such a way that can provoke disagreements and conflict. Whereas Confucians viewed it necessary to cultivate xin to develop de, or moral virtue, Zhuang Zhou considered this socialisation to be detrimental to one's personal nature.

== Buddhism ==
In East Asian Buddhism, the term "心" - "heart-mind," encompasses a holistic understanding of the mind, integrating thoughts, emotions, and consciousness as a unified entity. In the East Asian tradition, it is often seen as the core of one's being and the source of perception, emotion, and volition.

The East Asian conception of 心 is rooted in the Indian Buddhist concept of citta, which refers to the mind or consciousness but carries connotations of the innermost intention or mental state. In Indian Mahayana texts, one's citta is often regarded as the starting point of spiritual practice and the site of both defilement and potential awakening. The Indian idea of the inherently pure mind popular in Mahayana influenced East Asian interpretations, which expanded on it by emphasizing the innate purity and potential enlightenment of the heart-mind. This evolution of citta into the East Asian heart-mind reflects a synthesis of Indian Buddhist teachings with native philosophical ideas, resulting in a unique understanding central to various East Asian Buddhist schools.

Zen Buddhism emphasizes the direct experience of the ultimate source of the heart-mind, described as the "One Mind" in sources like Awakening of Faith. The practice of zazen (seated meditation) and the use of kōans are methods to transcend dualistic thinking and realize one's true nature, which is the "true mind" (真心) or the "Buddha-mind" i.e. buddha-nature. In Zen, awakening is often described as a direct realization of the true heart-mind, free from delusions.

Pure Land Buddhism meanwhile emphasizes the role of a mind of faith. In this tradition, the sincere and faithful invocation of Buddha Amitābha's name is seen as an expression of one's pure and devoted heart-mind, leading to rebirth in the Pure Land. This idea becomes the central soteriological concern in Japanese Pure Land Buddhism, especially Jodo Shinshu which emphasizes the "mind of true entrusting" (Shinjin 信心).
