= Zhang Junfang (writer) =

Zhang Junfang (Chinese: 張君房, fl. 10th and 11th century) was a Taoist practitioner and scholar of the Northern Song dynasty.

A native of Anlu (安陸) in Hubei, who served under the Emperor Zhenzong. He was noted as a wine drinker and a bibliophile. He compiled the Taoist encyclopedia Yunji Qiqian (雲笈七籤; translated as Seven Slips of the Cloudy Satchel, Seven Tablets in a Cloudy Satchel, or Seven Lots from the Bookbag of the Clouds.
