= Fan (Daoism) =

Daoist concept of reversion

- Shang-era oracle bone script for 反; fǎn

Chinese name
- Chinese: 反
- Literal meaning: return, reverse, repeat
Transcriptions
Standard Mandarin
- Hanyu Pinyin: fǎn
- Wade–Giles: fan
Hakka
- Romanization: fán
Yue: Cantonese
- Jyutping: faan^{2}
Middle Chinese
- Middle Chinese: /pjonX/
Old Chinese
- Baxter–Sagart (2014): /*Cə.panʔ/

Vietnamese name
- Vietnamese: phản

Korean name
- Hangul: 반
- Hanja: 反
Transcriptions
- Revised Romanization: ban
- McCune–Reischauer: pan

Japanese name
- Kanji: 反
- Hiragana: はん
- Katakana: ハン
Transcriptions
- Revised Hepburn: han

In ancient China, the term fan (反; fǎn; 'return'', ''reversion'', ''inversion') became associated with a basic concept within Daoism: the Daodejing remarks "Reversal is the movement of the Way ... Being is born from nonbeing." Daoist texts use fan in three interconnected meanings: as 'return to the root', 'cyclical return', and 'return to the contrary'. In Chinese cosmology, everything in the universe emerges from the primordial Dao, continually transforms, and inevitably returns to it, which parallels the eternal return in philosophy or cyclic model in physical cosmology. Fan is also significant in Chinese alchemy and Daoist meditation.

== Terminology ==
The word 反; fǎn is relatively common in both ancient and modern Chinese, and is semantically complex. A dictionary of pre-modern Chinese lists five translated meanings:

1. 'turn over', 'invert', 'turn upward'
2. 'turn back', 'reverse', 'go back', 'revert', 'return', 'turn round', 'repeat', 'do again'
3. go counter to', 'contrary', 'opposite', 'oppose; rebel', 'revolt
4. look inside', 'introspection
5. on the contrary', 'nevertheless', 'despite (the foregoing)'

The second meaning is also unambiguously written as 返; fǎn, a phono-semantic compound combining 反 as a phonetic element with the radical 辶 'WALK'. This 反 character has two alternate pronunciations: 反; fān; 'annul'', ''reverse'', ''overturn', and 反; fàn; 'trade'', ''peddle'', ''traffic in'', ''buy cheap and sell dear'—also written as 販, with the radical ⾙ 'SHELL'.

The Chinese character 反; fǎn; 'return'', ''turn over' was originally a compound ideograph with a 又; yòu; 'hand' and a line 𠂆, interpreted as representing either some item that the hand is turning over, or the turning motion itself.

Axel Schuessler's dictionary of Chinese etymology reconstructs Old Chinese *panʔ for pinyin: fǎn 反; 'to turn'', ''return'', ''turn around'', ''turn against'', ''rebel'', ''on the contrary'', ''however', which is cognate with pinyin: fàn < *pans 販; 'to trade', pinyin: fān < *phan 番; 'a turn'', ''a time'', ''turn'', ''change', and probably pinyin: pán < *bân 般; 'turn around'. The Sino-Tibetan etymology is evident in Tibetan pʰar ཕར '(monetary) interest', 'exchange', and Lepcha far 'price' and par 'buy'.

=== Related terminology ===
Hexagram 24: 復; fù Return (The Turning Point)

Early Daoist texts use fan with two near synonyms. 歸; guī has translation equivalents of: "1. Return home; return whence one came, originally or recently; go back to, retreat to; come full circle; recede; withdraw. 2. Take refuge with, as though going home; bring allegiance to; find haven with, resort to. 3. A daughter going to her new home in marriage. 4. Give back, return to its proper place or owner; restore, make restitution...". 复; fù or 復 "tautologically enlarged" (Karlgren) by the radical 彳 translates as meaning: "1. Go back over the same road, retrace; return, repair to; repeat(edly), duplicate; again, once more; resume restart, start over... 2. Return to earlier state, restore, renew. 3. Reply to, respond... 7. "Return" name of 24th hexagram of Yijing."

Fan (反) and huan (還) both have the significance of 'reaction' or 'return', as "when some kind of reverse change takes place as the result of a former action, or when a cyclical process brings back the phenomena to a state similar to that at the beginning, or identical with it."

== Daodejing ==
In the classic Daodejing the terms 反; fǎn, 歸; guī, and 复; fù each share the semantic field of 'reversal', 'return', 'reversion', 'renewal'. The philologist Victor H. Mair says that all three "suggest the continual reversion of the myriad creatures to the cosmic principle whence they arose", which corresponds with the philosopher Mircea Eliade's "myth of the eternal return".

Fan occurs four times in the Daodejing:

"Reversal is the movement of the Way [反者道之動]; Weakness is the usage of the Way [弱者道之用]. All creatures under heaven are born from being; Being is born from nonbeing."

— 40, tr. Mair (1990), p. 8

"Being great implies flowing ever onward, Flowing ever onward implies far-reaching, Far-reaching implies reversal [遠曰反]"

— 25, tr. Mair (1990), p. 90

"Deep and distant is this mysterious integrity! It runs counter to things [與物反矣] until it reaches the great confluence"

— 65, tr. Mair (1990), p. 36

"He who bears abuse directed against the state is called 'lord of the altars for the gods of soil and grain'; He who bears the misfortunes of the state is called the 'king of all under heaven.'" True words seem contradictory [正言若反]"

— 78, tr. Mair (1990), p. 54

Fan expresses the idea of reversal. Things constantly changing into their opposites, winter turns into summer, day into night, similar to yin-yang processes: yin becomes yang, yang again becomes yin. It is the cyclical motion of history and natural processes, implying that things and situations eventually change into their counterparts.

復; fù occurs fourteen times in eight sections of the text. Six occurrences are in the word 復歸; fùguī; 'return', which is a compound of two synonyms.

"Infinitely extended and unnamable, It [the Way] returns to nonentity [復歸於無物]."

— 14, tr. Mair (1990), p. 74

"The myriad creatures arise side by side, thus I observe their renewal [吾以觀復]. Heaven's creatures abound, but each returns to its roots [各復歸其根], which is called "stillness" [歸根曰靜]. This is termed "renewal of fate [是謂復命]." Renewal of fate is perpetual [復命曰常] – To know the perpetual is to be enlightened"

— 16, tr. Mair (1990), p. 78

"By being a ravine for all under heaven, Eternal integrity will never desert you. If eternal integrity never deserts you, You will return to the state of infancy [復歸於嬰兒]. Know you are innocent, Remain steadfast when insulted, and be a valley for all under heaven. By being a valley for all under heaven, Eternal integrity will suffice. If eternal integrity suffices, You will return to the simplicity of the unhewn log [復歸於樸]. Know whiteness, Maintain blackness, and be a model for all under heaven. By being a model for all under heaven, Eternal integrity will not err. If eternal integrity does not err, You will return to infinity [復歸於無極]."

— 28, tr. Mair (1990), p. 93

"Everything under heaven has a beginning which may be thought of as the mother of all under heaven. Having realized the mother, you thereby know her children. Knowing her children, go back to abide with the mother [復守其母]. ... Seeing what is small is called insight, Abiding in softness is called strength. Use your light to return to insight [復歸其明], Be not an inheritor of personal calamity. This is called "following the constant."

— 52, tr. Mair (1990), p. 21

The remaining occurrences are simply of fu alone.

"Abolish sagehood and abandon cunning, the people will benefit a hundredfold; Abolish humaneness and abandon righteousness, the people will once again be filial and kind [民復孝慈]; Abolish cleverness and abandon profit, bandits and thieves will be no more."

— 19, tr. Mair (1990), p. 81

"Disaster is that whereon good fortune depends, Good fortune is that wherein disaster lurks. Who knows their limits? When there is no uprightness, correct reverts to crafty [正復為奇], good reverts to gruesome [善復為妖]. The delusion of mankind, How long have been its days!"

— 58, tr. Mair (1990), p. 27

"The sage desires to be without desire and does not prize goods that are hard to obtain; He learns not to learn and reverts to what the masses pass by [復衆人之所過]. Thus, he can help the myriad creatures be natural, but dares not act."

— 64, tr. Mair (1990), p. 35

"Let the people go back to tying knots to keep records [使民復結繩而用之]. Let their food be savory, their clothes beautiful, their customs pleasurable, their dwellings secure."

— 80, tr. Mair (1990), p. 39

Fu or fugui is a return to one's origin, as in the biblical saying "... for dust thou art, and unto dust shalt thou return" (Genesis 3:19). It expresses the transitory nature of all existence; beings appear, exist for a while, and then disappear to make room for new beings.

Gui occurs eleven times in the Daodejing, including the six fugui and 歸其根; guīqígēn; 'return to its roots' mentioned above.

"Motionless am I, without any sign, as a baby that has yet to gurgle. How dejected! as though having nowhere to return [儽儽兮若無所歸]"

— 20, tr. Mair (1990), p. 83

"The old saying about the bent being preserved intact is indeed close to the mark! Truly, he shall be returned intact [誠全而歸之]"

— 22, tr. Mair (1990), p. 88

"Eternally without desire, It [the Way] may be named among the small; The myriad creatures return to it [萬物歸焉], But it does not act as their ruler; It may be named among the great"

— 34, tr. Mair (1990), p. 101

"It is not merely that their spirits do not harm people, but that the sage also does not harm them. Now, When neither harms the other, integrity accrues to both [故德交歸焉]"

— 60, tr. Mair (1990), p. 30

The Chinese philosopher and historian Fung Yu-lan said that fan meaning 'reversion' and fu meaning 'return' refer to the greatest of all the laws underlying phenomenal change: "if any one thing moves to an extreme in one direction, a change must bring about an opposite result".

== Zhuangzi ==
The c. 4th-2nd centuries BCE Zhuangzi reiterates the Daodejing concerning the importance of returning or reversing.

反; fǎn; 'return' occurs 90 times in the text, such as:

"All things that flourish are born of the soil and return to the soil. [皆生於土而反於土]"

— tr. Mair (1994), p. 99

"If they [ancient "hidden scholars"] had received the mandate of the times and been able to carry it out widely for all under heaven, they would have returned to the unity that leaves no traces [則反一無跡]. Not having received the mandate of the times and greatly stymied by all under heaven, they sunk their roots deep in utter tranquillity and waited. That is the Way they preserved in their persons."

— 16, tr. Mair (1994), p. 150

"The principles by which they follow in sequence upon one another, The mutual causation through which they conspicuously revolve, Their reversal after reaching an extreme, Their beginning after coming to an end [窮則反，終則始], These are the qualities inherent in things."

— 25, tr. Mair (1994), p. 26

The text uses the 'return' synonyms fu, gui, and fugui 50 times, 34 times, and twice, respectively. The Zhuangzi mentions the Daodejing theme of 'returning to the root', 'origin', or 'beginning'.

"Release your mind, Free your spirit; Be impassively soulless. The myriad things abound, Yet each returns to its roots [各復其根]. Each returns to its roots without being aware that it is doing so."

— 11, tr. Mair (1994), p. 99

"Culture destroyed substance, and erudition drowned mind. After that, the people began to be confused and disordered, without any means to return to their natural emotions or to revert to their origins [無以反其性情而復其初]."

— 16, tr. Mair (1994), p. 149-150

"Those who would mend their nature through vulgar learning, seeking to restore its original condition [復其初], and those who would polish their desires through vulgar thinking, seeking to perfect their intelligence, may be called deluded persons."

— 16, tr. Mair (1994), p. 148

"Now, is it not difficult for what has already become a thing to return to its roots [欲復歸根]? Could anyone but the great man find it easy? For life is the disciple of death and death is the beginning of life. Who knows their regulator? Human life is the coalescence of vital breath. When it coalesces there is life; when it dissipates there is death."

— 22, tr. Mair (1994), p. 212

"The true man of old knew neither fondness for life nor aversion to death, was neither elated by going forth nor reluctant to return. Casually he went and casually he came. He neither forgot what his beginning had been nor sought what his end would be. Happily he received and forgetfully he returned [忘而復之]."

— 6, tr. Mair (1994), p. 52

Two chapters mention "returning to the simplicity of the unhewn log" (cf. Daodejing 28 above).

"He [i.e., Liezi] took no sides in affairs and whittled himself back to the simplicity of the unhewn log [彫琢復樸]. Clodlike, he stood alone in his physical form. Sealed off against perplexity, in this manner he remained whole to the end."

— 7, tr. Mair (1994), p. 70

"After all the carving and chiseling, Return to the simplicity of the unhewn log [復歸於樸]."

— 20, tr. Mair (1994), p. 190

== Huainanzi ==
The c. 139 BCE Huainanzi ('Writings of the Huainan Masters'), a collection of essays by scholars in the court of Liu An, Prince of Huainan. It quotes from many pre-Han schools of thought, including Huang–Lao Daoism, Confucianism, and Legalism.

Fan is a key concept in the Huainanzi. The text conceives all cosmic and human realms in terms of the basic 本末; běnmò; 'root and branch', i.e. the 'fundamental peripheral' framework in which any move from a 'branch' state back toward a 'root' state is marked as a 'return' or 'reversion'. On a cosmic level, fan characterizes the Dao itself, as all phenomena tend over time (through death, decay, or destruction) to revert to the undifferentiated root from which they emerged. Second, on a human level, the return or reversion process can unlock great potential power in the adept of Daoist cultivation.

The Huainanzi uses several near-synonyms with fan referring to the Daoist doctrine of "returning to one's original, undifferentiated nature", a pervasive theme that occurs more than ninety times in fifteen of the twenty-one chapters. They include 反己; fanji; 'return to the self', 反本; fanben; 'return to one's root', 反性; fanxing; 'return to one's nature', and 反其初; fanqichu; 'return to one's beginning'. Non-differentiation refers to the "perfect beginning before distinction, division, multiplicity and separateness emerged: everything was smoothly and harmoniously blended into one compact whole; everything was simultaneously 'together'."

The Huainanzi describes the ability of a zhenren ('genuine/true person') to "return to the origin — the state of primordial undifferentiation, the perfect beginning before things appeared as distinct and separate".

"In antiquity, at the Grand Beginning, human beings came to life in "Non-being" and acquired a physical form in "Being." Having a physical form, [human beings] came under the control of things. But those who can return to that from which they were born, as if they had not yet acquired a physical form, are called the "Genuine." The Genuine are those who have not yet begun to differentiate from the Grand One [真人者未始分於太一者]"

— 14.1, tr. Major et al. (2010), p. 537

The text frequently transfers specific attributes of the Daoist zhenren genuine person to the sage ruler. For instance, the Huainanzi says:

"Only the sage can leave things aside and return to himself [惟聖人能遺物而反己] ... those who have not heard the Way have no means to return to nature [是故不聞道者無以反性]."

— 11.5, tr. Major et al. (2010), p. 404

"Thus the sage embodies the Way and returns to nature [故聖人體道反性]; he does not transform in facing transformation, thus he comes close to withdrawal"

— 11.15, tr. Major et al. (2010), p. 419

"Thus, the heart is the root of the self; the self is the root of the state [故心者身之本也身者國之本也]. There has never been a person who gained "the self" and lost the people; there has never been a person who lost "the self" and gained the people. ... the root of reducing endeavors lies in regulating desires; the root of regulating desires lies in reverting to nature [節用之本在於反性]"

— 20.28, tr. Major et al. (2010), p. 825

Even though the text asserts that certain changes, such as developments in human social and political institutions, are not ultimately reversible, it concedes that effective governance depends upon political leaders returning to the root by through personal cultivation.

Daodejing (16) "Heaven's creatures abound, but each returns to its roots [各復歸其根]" is quoted in one 'Huainanzi passage:

"Completely indifferent, as if lacking ethereal and material souls, he causes the myriad things all to return to their own roots [使萬物各復歸其根]"

— 6.9, tr. Major et al. (2010), p. 230

== Interpretations ==
The French sinologist Isabelle Robinet analyzed how commentators and interpreters broadly understand fan (反) in three interrelated meanings: "return to the root", "return cyclically", and "return to the contrary".

=== Return to the root ===
First, fan indicates 'returning to the root'. 歸根; guigen; 'going back to the root' is a basic Daoist expression, as seen in the Daodejing and Zhuangzi above. In a literal sense, "fan is the root" (Heshang Gong), it is 'to return to the root' (Lin Xiyi), and "to return to the beginning" (Deng Yi). In contexts that identify the Dao with the human spirit or nature, Shao Ruoyu speaks of fan "returning 心; xīn; 'spirit' to the interior", Li Yue suggests "to return to the empty spirit," and Su Che says "to return to xing (性; "nature")". An early example of this first meaning is the c. 300 BCE Guodian Chu Slips manuscript entitled Taiyi Shengshui (太一生水, The Great One Generated Water), which states that Water, after being generated, returns (fan) to the Great One (Taiyi) [水反輔大一] to assist it in forming Heaven.

The Daodejing translator D. C. Lau refuted the usual interpretation that fan "turn back" in "turning back is how the way moves" refers to endless cycles of development and decline; Something weak inevitably develops into something strong, but when this process reaches its limit, the opposite process of decline sets in and what is strong once again becomes something weak, until decline reaches its lowest limit only to give way once more to development. Lau reasoned that if change is cyclic and a thing that reaches the limit in one direction will revert to the opposite direction, then the central Daoist precept that "To hold fast to the submissive is called strength" becomes both "useless" because if both development and decline are inevitable, the purpose of the former is to avoid latter, and "impracticable" because it advocates that we should remain stationary in a world of incessant change. Instead of "cyclic return", Lau reinterpreted fan to mean "return to one's roots". The Daodejing says that once a thing has reached the limits of development, it will inevitably return to its roots and decline, but says nothing about redevelopment being equally inevitable after the return.

=== Return cyclically ===
Second, Robinet cited a Chinese cosmogonic interpretation is that fan means "cyclic return; beginning anew", referring to the reversal of a force that, when it arrives at its apogee, then declines, due to a complementary force in cyclical alternation "like a ring" (e.g., Chen Xianggu, Zhang Sicheng, and Lin Xiyi). On a phenomenological level, fan is the rhythm of life's movements. When something has grown to its ji (極; 'utmost point'), it decreases or reverses to its contrary, as do Yin and Yang or night and day. For instance, the Liezi says, "Death and life are one [time] going and one [time] returning", and the Yijing's Xici (繫辭; "Appended Statements") explains that the Dao is "one [time] Yin and one [time] Yang." The first and second meanings are essentially identical (Lin Xiyi's commentary gives both), but in different realms. For the universe, fan denotes returning to its cosmic Origin, the Dao, or the Void. Analogically, for people, fan is returning to the original Void that is the basis for their xing (性; "individual nature").

Norman J. Girardot says the Dao is a living thing that follows a "law of cyclic return", which manifests creative activity and life-giving force. Beginning in its primordial condition of hundun chaos, the Dao "goes out" (逝; shi or 出; chu) giving birth to all phenomenal things, finally reaching an "apogee" (遠; yuan or 徼; jiao) of movement, at which point it reverses itself and "returns" (fan) to its beginning state. The "life" of the Dao is generated by and returning in on itself, going out and coming back in a spontaneous and creative way characterized by its ziran (lit. "self-so") freedom of movement.

According to the Encyclopædia Britannica, the Return to the Dao is one of the most important basic concepts of Daoism: within the universe's rhythmic fluctuations and transformations, all things eventually return or revert to the Dao from which they emerged.

The law of the Dao as natural order refers to the continuous reversion of everything to its starting point. Anything that develops extreme qualities will invariably revert to the opposite qualities: “Reversion is the movement of the Dao” (Laozi). Everything issues from the Dao and ineluctably returns to it; Undifferentiated Unity becomes multiplicity in the movement of the Dao. Life and death are contained in this continuing transformation from Nothing into Something and back to Nothing, but the underlying primordial unity is never lost.

=== Return to the contrary ===
Third, Robinet said fan can metaphysically mean "return to the contrary initial state", by which the cause of a thing is not the same as the thing itself, but rather its opposite. Wang Bi says "in movement, if we know that there is non-being (無; wu), all things interpenetrate". He also describes fan as the "Dao of ziran", which is to say that it is a natural law of motion for renewing the source. Lu Xisheng says fan is the reversal that form begins from the formIess. Fan has different ontological meanings according to whether it refers to our closed world, in which everything is finite and forever reverses to its opposite or initial state, or refers to the absolute Dao that is infinitely void and limitless, transcending changes and reversals.

The sinologist Bryan W. Van Norden says fan "reversal" in the Daodejing is the fact that things tend to change over to their opposites, for example, "things may be diminished by being increased, increased by being diminished". Another context asks a rhetorical question about ji (極; "limits', 'extremes")) to illustrate the unpredictability of reversals. "It is on disaster that good fortune perches; It is beneath good fortune that disaster crouches. Who knows the limit? There is no straightforwardness. The straightforward changes once again into the crafty, and the good changes once again into the monstrous." Van Norden says any conscious effort to anticipate changes in the world is doomed to failure, because no one knows the "limits" or points at which reversal will occur. One should instead avoid self-conscious thinking and rely on mystical insight into the Dao. He agrees with D. C. Lau that cyclical change is not inevitable, the Daodejing says disaster "crouches" beneath good fortune, but it does not "necessarily follow" it. For instance, it is possible that a person can overcome the strong by being weak, yet avoid becoming strong themself, while maintaining wuwei, for "reversal is the movement of the Dao."

A professor of Chinese philosophy and religion says notion of fan suggests not only the need to "return" to the Dao, but also that the Daoist way of life would inevitably "appear the very opposite of 'normal' existence, and that it involves a complete revaluation of values".

Eric Sean Nelson philosophically interprets fan (反; "reversal") as "unending transversal without a terminating synthesis". The Dao is characterized by motility and reversibility, "reversal is the dao's movement", but reversibility does not end with the first fan reversal, whether it is a return to the root, nature, or the origin. "All reversal is itself further reversible, as the source returns to and moves toward itself repeatedly without finality or a concluding synthesis." The dialectic of non-identity and the mutuality of opposites means that reversal can be infinitely transversed.

== Daoist alchemy and meditation ==
Cosmogenic reversion or inversion (反; fan, 還; huan) is central to Chinese alchemy, which comprises elixir-compounding waidan ("external alchemy") and psychophysiological neidan ("internal alchemy"). Notions range from a general fan ("returning") to cosmic unity to more specific guigen (歸根; "returning to the root") or huanyuan (還元; "returning to the origin"). Huanyuan in Daoist neidan is equated with the goal of returning to one's benxin' (本心; "original mind") in Chan Buddhism.

=== Waidan ===
External waidan alchemy conceives of the cosmos as the outcome of spontaneous processes. Daoist cosmogony typically involves the progression from Nonbeing to Oneness, followed by the emergence of the yin and yang principles, which join in generating and differentiating the myriad beings. Inversion, return, or reversion to the original state can be achieved by reversing the cosmogonic process through re-enacting its developmental stages in inverse order. These notions are the basis for all main waidan practices. Through cyclical refining and smelting, the alchemical ingredients revert to their original condition, and yield their jing (精, "pure essences"). This In this way, the cosmos is restored to its original, timeless state, allowing the adept to gain access to the corresponding state of timelessness or immortality.

=== Neidan ===
Internal neidan alchemy uses cosmological language both to explain the fundamental cosmic configurations and to guide adepts to a primordial order, with the belief that inverting the cosmogonic process will fan ("return") to the pre-cosmological state of existence. Daoist mystics not only ritually and physiologically adapt themselves to the alternations of nature, but are said to create an internal void that permits them to return to nature's origin.

==== Returning to the embryo ====
"Return" is an essential term in Daoist neidan alchemical literature, for example, the term fantai (反胎; "returning to the embryo") refers to mentally repeating one's embryonic development, emphasizing "the return of the physical freshness and perfect vital force of infancy, childhood, and even fetal life". As mentioned above, the Daodejing (28, cf. 55) says, "If eternal integrity never deserts you, You will return to the state of infancy", which suggests that "human vitality is fully charged upon parturition and constantly discharges with every natural cycle of breath". Returning to the origin, the womb, or the embryo implies the idea of "rebirth and renewal as a kind of countercurrent to ordinary life".

==== Physiological alchemy ====
One of the most central ideas in physiological alchemy is "retracing one's steps along the road of bodily decay"; in addition to the above fan (反) and huan (還) meaning "regeneration; reversion", other technical terms include xiu (修; "restoration"), xiubu (修補; "repair"), and fu (復; "replenishment"). A related neidan theory is making certain bodily fluids, particularly products of the salivary and testicular glands, flow in a direction opposite to the usual, which is expressed by such terms as niliu (逆流) or nixing (逆行). Authors of Daoist alchemical texts repeatedly give cosmogony as the chief example for the process of shun (順; "continuation"), a series of stages that lead to degeneration and ultimately to death, whereas neidan is based on the opposite notion of ni (逆; "inversion"). The ultimate task of a neidan alchemist is to diandao (顛倒; "turn upside down") the normal processes of the cosmos.

==== Hui ====
The term hui (回 or 迴, "return; turn backwards; reverse") is regularly used in Taoist expressions such as huiyuan (回元; "to return to the principle") and huiben (回本; "to return to the root"). In neidan terminology, huixin (回心; 'turn one's heart toward') means "to convert", while huijing (回精; 'reverse the sperm/essence') connotes flowing against the current and refers to a Daoist sexual practice that supposedly "makes the essence go up" into the brain. Hui is synonymous with fan ("turn back; reverse"), exemplified by the chengyu idiom huiguang fanzhao (回光反照; "to reverse one's light and turn back one's gaze", colloquially meaning "last glow before sunset").

=== Meditation ===
In Daoist meditation, fan ("return; turn back; revert") takes on a more technical meaning in terms such as fanzhao (反照; "turn back one's light" of sight") or fanting (反聽; 'turn back one's hearing'), both of which denote turning one's attention and perceptions inwardly. Fanzhao figuratively means "turn back one's gaze; turn one's sight inward", which neidan adepts practice in order to "illuminate the plethora of anthropomorphized cosmic elements that make up the inner pantheon".

== Non-Daoist traditions ==
Besides Daoist inner alchemical texts, the notion of turning inward (fan 反 or 返) is also prevalent in Buddhist and Confucian traditions. For example, the Ming dynasty Neo-Confucian Zhou Rudeng (周汝登, 1547–1629) urged his followers to practice a number of contemplative practices: self-reflection (反思; fansi; 反照; fanzhao), inner contemplation (反觀; fanguan), and self-regulation (自調; zi tiao).
