= Pu (Taoism) =

Metaphor for humanity's natural state

Chinese name
- Traditional Chinese: 樸
- Simplified Chinese: 朴
- Literal meaning: unworked wood
Transcriptions
Standard Mandarin
- Hanyu Pinyin: pǔ
- Wade–Giles: p'u
Yue: Cantonese
- Yale Romanization: buk6, pok3
- Jyutping: buk6, pok3
Southern Min
- Hokkien POJ: phoh
Middle Chinese
- Middle Chinese: pʰåk

Vietnamese name
- Vietnamese alphabet: phác
- Chữ Hán: 朴

Korean name
- Hangul: 복, 박
- Hanja: 樸
Transcriptions
- Revised Romanization: bok, pak
- McCune–Reischauer: pok, pak

Japanese name
- Kanji: 朴
- Hiragana: ぼく, ほお
Transcriptions
- Revised Hepburn: boku, hō

Pu is a Chinese word meaning "unworked wood; inherent quality; simple" that was an early Daoist metaphor for the natural state of humanity, and relates with the Daoist keyword ziran (literally "self so") "natural; spontaneous". The scholar Ge Hong (283–343 CE) immortalized pu in his pen name Baopuzi "Master who Embraces Simplicity" and eponymous book Baopuzi. It occurs in some of the earliest Chinese classics, including the Daodejing and the Zhuangzi.

== Terminology ==
Pu can be written with either of the variant Chinese characters 樸 or 朴, which are linguistically complex.

=== Characters ===
Both 樸 and 朴 are classified as radical-phonetic characters, combining the semantically significant "tree" radical 木 (commonly used for writing names of trees and wooden objects) with the phonetic indicators pu 菐 or bu 卜.

The Chinese character pu 樸 was first recorded on Chinese bronze inscriptions from the Spring and Autumn period (771-476 BCE), and the character pu 朴 was first recorded in Chinese classics from the Warring States period (475-221 BCE).

When the People's Republic of China promulgated simplified Chinese characters in 1956, the established variant pu 朴 (with 6 strokes) was chosen to replace the traditional Chinese character pu 樸 (with 16 strokes).

One of the two (c. 168 BCE) Mawangdui silk manuscript versions of the Daodejing, discovered in 1973 by archeologists excavating a tomb, uses a rare textual variant character for pu 樸: wò 楃 "a house tent (esp. with a wooden roof)", written with the "tree radical" and wu 屋 "room; house" phonetic. The "B" text, like the received version, uses pu 樸 8 times in 6 chapters; the "A" text uses wò 楃 6 times in 4 chapters and has lacunae in chapters 19 and 57. The (c. 121 CE) Shuowen jiezi defines wo 楃 as muzhang 木帳 "wood canopy", and the (early 3rd century) Guangya defines it as choumu 幬幕 "curtain; cover". These variant words pú < *phrôk 樸 "unworked wood" and wò < *ʔôk 楃 "house tent" are semantically and phonologically dissimilar.

=== Pronunciations and meanings ===
The comprehensive Chinese character dictionary Hanyu Da Zidian lists 2 pronunciations and 8 meanings for the character 樸, and 6 pronunciations and 11 meanings for 朴; which are summarized below.

The glyph 樸 can be read:

- pǔ
1. "unworked wood",
2. "cut down; fell trees"
3. "nature; essence; intrinsic quality" (compare English in the rough)
4. "simple; plain; unadorned; unaffected"
5. "(economics) net cost"
- pú
1. "grow thickly (of plants); shrub"
2. "an oak tree"
3. "attached; affixed"

The glyph 朴 can be read to mean:

- pǔ
1. "unworked wood; natural; plain; etc." (= pǔ 樸)
2. "large"
3. "uncured meat"
- pū
1. "root; basis; origin"
2. "beat; hit; an instrument of torture" (= pū 撲)
- pò
1. "tree bark; (esp.) magnolia bark" in houpo 厚朴 "Magnolia officinalis bark (used in Traditional Chinese medicine)"
2. in pòshù 朴樹 "Celtis sinensis, Chinese hackberry"
- pō
1. in pōdāo 朴刀 "a kind of two-handed sword"
- Pú
1. "a surname", namely Park (Korean surname)
- Piáo
1. "a surname"

The Erya, which is the oldest Chinese dictionary, defined pu 樸 and supu 樕樸 as "oak" names (in "Explaining Trees" chapter 14). First, pu 樸 is defined as bao 枹 (14:45). Guo Pu's Erya commentary identified this pu tree as yupu 棫樸 "Quercus acutissima, saw-tooth oak" (which occurs in the Shijing below). Bao 枹 is usually read fu "drumstick", and Guo noted this name bao denoted "a kind of oak [樸] that grew in clumps", and quotes the Shijing usage as baoli 枹櫟 instead of baoli 苞櫟 "bushy oak" (see below). The Bencao Gangmu says there are two varieties of hu 槲 "Quercus mongolica, Mongolian oak", the bao 枹 is small and grows in clumps while the li 櫟 is tall and has large leaves. Second, supu 樕樸 is defined as xin 心 "heart; mind" (14:64). Guo identifies supu (cf. reverse pusu 樸樕 in the Shijing below) as husu 槲樕 (with hu 槲 "Mongolian oak"), the "Quercus dentata, daimyo oak". While xin "heart; mind" is a common Chinese word, this Erya definition is the only known context in which it names a tree. The Yijing uses xin to mean "thorn; prick": "Among varieties of wood it means those which are firm and have much pith".

The Shuowen Jiezi, the first Chinese dictionary of characters, simply defines pu 朴 as mupi 木皮 "tree bark; wood with bark", and pu 樸 as musu 木素 "plain wood; unworked lumber" (later meaning "lignin" in scientific terminology).

Returning to the central Daoist meaning of pu, Pas and Leung challenge the stereotyped "uncarved block" translation of pu: "The idea implied in it comes closer to 'wholeness', which is also contained in 'uncarved block', except that 'uncarved block' has been reified. As a result, what was an excellent analogy of the Tao has become sterile and counterproductive." Citing the pu translations of Séraphin Couvreur "wood that has not been worked on; simple, without ornament, without disguise" and Bernhard Karlgren "wood in its natural state, not worked: rough, plain, natural, simple"; Pas and Leung conclude: "it is obvious where the expression 'uncarved block' came from, but the addition of 'block' is an interpretation. The term means 'plain wood, uncarved wood'."

=== Etymology ===
Reconstructions of Old Chinese pronunciations have transformed Chinese etymology. Old Chinese reconstructions of pu or bu 樸 include:

- bú < *pûk or *b'ûk
- bú < *puk or *b'uk "shrubby trees", pŭ < *p'uk "rough; unadorned", and pò < *p'ǔk "trim unworked wood; robust, solid"
- pú < *phruk
- bú < *puk or *buk
- pú < *phrôk "to trim wood", "in a natural state, unworked"
- pŭ < *pʰˤrok "unworked wood"

Victor Mair suggests that pu < *phluk 樸 "unhewn log" is "almost certainly related to the English word "block," which probably derives from the Indo-European root bhelk (beam)".

Axel Schuessler says the etymology of pú < *phrôk "to trim wood" could either be an "aspirated iterative derivation" from bāo < *prôk 剝 "cut up, peel, pluck", or "belong to the homophonous etymon with the basic meaning 'in a natural state, unworked', as in pú 樸 'in a natural state', 璞 'unworked precious stone' ".

== Early textual references ==
Pu occurs in some of the earliest Chinese classics, frequently in Daoist ones.

=== Shijing ===
Two odes in the Shijing "Classic of Poetry" use pu 樸 compounds to mean "an oak".

Pusu 樸樕 occurs in Ode 23: "scrubby oaks", "a clump of oaks", "low shrubby trees". The Mao commentary describes the pusu as a 小木 "small tree". The Erya (above) writes this reversible compound as supu 樕樸.

Yupu 棫樸 is the name of Ode 238, which records using this tree for firewood: "the yih and the p'oh", "the oak clumps". Commentaries describe the yupu as a "dense and shrubby tree".

In addition, Ode 132 has baoli 苞櫟: "the bushy oaks", "a clump of oaks", "luxuriant oaks". The Erya has baoli 枹櫟, writing bao as 枹 "an oak" instead of 苞 "bushy; luxuriant".

=== Shujing ===
The Shujing "Classic of History" (Zhoushu 周書, Zicai 梓材 "Chinese catalpa lumber" section) uses pu once in the compound pozhou 樸斫 (po "trim unworked wood" and zhuo "hack; chop off"): "as in working with the wood of the rottlera, when the toil of the coarser and finer operations has been completed, they have to apply the paint of red and other colours", "It is as when one works on catalpa wood; when he has toiled in trimming and carving it, he should take measures for making it red or green". Legge notes that pu means "the rough fashioning of the work" and zhou means "the fine finish given to it". Karlgren quotes the Han commentator Ma Rong that po 樸 denotes "wood that has not yet been worked into a utensil; unworked wood", and concludes po means "to treat the unworked wood (in the first rough cutting); to trim" is a variation of the same stem as pu 樸 "in a natural state; simple".

=== Daodejing ===
Six Daodejing chapters use pu 樸, two of them twice, for a total of 8 occurrences.

Chapter 19 parallels the near-synonyms su 素 "raw silk; white; plain; simple; quiet" and pu 樸 "unworked wood; plain; simple", and was the source for Ge Hong's pen-name Baopuzi "Master who Embraces Simplicity".

- Evince the plainness of undyed silk, Embrace the simplicity of the unhewn log; Lessen selfishness, Diminish desires; Abolish learning and you will be without worries. (19)

Holmes Welch describes pu "the Uncarved Block" and su "Raw Silk" as symbols that Laozi used to expound his basic doctrine of "the return to our original nature". In modern usage, pu and su mean "plain," but originally pu "was wood as it came from the tree before man had dressed it", while su "was silk that man had never dyed or painted."

Chapters 28 and 57 mention simple pu in reference to shengren 聖人 "sages", Chapter 15 similarly refers to ancient Daoist adepts and describes pu as dun 敦 "sincere; honest; plain".

- If eternal integrity suffices, You will return to the simplicity of the unhewn log. ... When the unhewn log is sawn apart, it is made into tools; When the sage is put to use, he becomes the chief of officials. For Great carving does no cutting. (28)
- The sage has a saying: "I take no action, yet the people transform themselves; I do not interfere in affairs, yet the people enrich themselves; I desire not to desire, yet the people of themselves become simple as unhewn logs." (57)
- Those of old who were adept in the Way were … hesitant, as though crossing a stream in winter; cautious, as though fearful of their neighbors all around; solemn, as though guests in someone else's house; shrinking, as ice when it melts; plain, as an unhewn log; muddled, as turbid waters; expansive, as a broad valley. (15)

Among all the Daodejing occurrences of pu, chapter 28 is the only case in which the transmitted and excavated versions are significantly different – the transmitted text has an extra grammatical particle zhi 之 "a possessive marker; a 3rd person pronoun" after yong 用 "use; employ". Robert G. Henricks explains this small grammatical change between the standard text saying the sage yong zhi "uses it" and the excavated silk text saying yong "is used". The transmitted version 樸散則為器聖人用之則為官長 "When the uncarved wood is broken up, it is turned into concrete things. But when the sage uses it, he becomes the leading official." should be read 樸散則為器聖人用則為官長 "When uncarved wood is cut up, it's turned into vessels. When the Sage is used, he becomes the Head of Officials." D. C. Lau says the traditional passage "seems to say that when the uncarved block shatters it becomes vessels. A vessel is a specialist who is only fitted to be an official. Hence the sage when he makes use of these vessels becomes the lord over the officials.", but in Mawangdui passage, "The meaning is very different. The uncarved block is a symbol for the sage. Just as the uncarved block becomes vessels when it shatters so does the sage become the chief of the officials when he allows himself to be employed, and just as the uncarved block is ruined when it becomes useful, so does a sage become ruined when he becomes useful." The word qi 器 "vessel; utensil" is translated here as "tools", "concrete things", "vessels", "specialists", and "officials".

Chapters 32 and 37 both address houwang 侯王 "feudal lords and kings" and describe the Dao as wuming 無名 "nameless", while 37 also calls pu "nameless".

- The Way is eternally nameless. Though the unhewn log is small, No one in the world dares subjugate it. If feudal lords and kings could maintain it, The myriad creatures would submit of themselves. (32)
- The Way is eternally nameless. If feudal lords and kings preserve it, The myriad creatures will be transformed by themselves. After transformation, if they wish to rise up, I shall restrain them with the nameless unhewn log. By restraining them with the nameless unhewn log, They will not feel disgraced; Not feeling disgraced, They will be still, Whereupon heaven and earth will be made right by themselves. (37)

Chapter 37 has a minor textual difference between buyu 不欲 "not desire" in the standard version and buru 不辱 "not disgrace" in the Mawangdui version.

Lau explains pu in the Daodejing primarily means "the uncarved block is in a state as yet untouched by the artificial interference of human ingenuity and so is a symbol for the original state of man before desire is produced in him by artificial means".

The (c. 3rd century CE) Heshang Gong commentary version of this Daoist text interchangeably writes pu as both 樸 and 朴. Three chapters (28, 32, 37) use 樸 in both text and commentary, and one (15) uses 朴 in both. One (19) uses 樸 in text and 樸朴 in commentary, and another (57) uses 朴 in text and 樸 in commentary.

- "If they change and want to rise, the ego will suppress them by means of the [樸] simplicity of the nameless."; "The ego is the personality. The [樸] simplicity of the nameless is Tao. If all beings change into their selves, but afterwards revert to desire and exhibit shrewdness and hypocrisy, the princes and the king are obliged to suppress personality by means of Tao and Te." (37)
- "Simple like [朴] unworked wood."; "What is simple is material and firm. The form of unworked wood is not yet carved. Within one ought to take care of the spirits, outwards one ought not to be pretentious." (15)
- "Look at simplicity and hold fast to [樸] naturalness."; "To look at simplicity corresponds to holding fast to simplicity and keeping to truth as well as to not looking at externals. To hold fast to [朴] naturalness corresponds to looking at real naturalness in order to show it to the subjects. Thereby one may become a model." (19)
- "I am without desires, and the people are [朴] simple of themselves."; "If I am always without desires, if I do away with externals, then the people will follow me and remain [樸] simple and natural." (57)

Of nine Daodejing chapters without 樸 or 朴 in the text, three (3, 38, 41) use 樸 in commentary, and six (17, 64, 68, 71, 80, 81) use 朴. For examples,

- "He [the saint] always induces the people not to know and not to desire."; "Return to [樸] simplicity and retain purity." (3)
- "Sincere words are not beautiful."; "Sincere words are true words. What is not beautiful is [朴] simple and real." (81)

Welch paraphrases the Daodejing relationship among pu, de "inherent character; inner power", and wuwei "non-action; non-doing". Outwardly, one cannot achieve de "until you have erased the aggressive patterns etched by society into your nature. You must return to your natural self, to [pu]. You must discard morality and ambition, for if you keep these you will never be capable of compassion, moderation, and humility. When you discard some of your wishes, you will have them all." Inwardly, one performs several cultivations. "For, to achieve the outward [pu] you will have to cultivate a [wuwei] of the mind. And when the mind is quiet, [pu] will deepen. It will become a faculty for intuitively sensing the order of the universe — the [Dao] that can be named."

=== Zhuangzi ===
Pu occurs 20 times in the (ca. 3rd century BCE) Daoist classic Zhuangzi. The standard Zhuangzi text writes pu both with the 16–stroke character 樸 six times in three chapters (9, 13, and 31) and with the 6–stroke variant character 朴 fourteen times in six chapters (7, 10, 12, 14, 16, and 20), which evidences the heterogeneous textual origins. For instance, the word pubi (with bi 鄙 "low; mean; vulgar; unsophisticated") is written both 樸鄙 "crude, mean [heart]" (chapter 31) and 朴鄙 "simple and unsophisticated [people]" (10).

A frequently occurring Zhuangzi metaphor contrasts returning to pu 樸 "unhewn log" with carving qi 器 "vessels" (which means "specialist; official" in Daodejing 28).

- In a world of ultimate integrity, men would dwell together with the birds and the beasts. ... Equally without desire, this is called [素樸] "the simplicity of the unhewn log". With [素樸] the simplicity of the unhewn log, the people would attain their nature. ... Therefore, if [純樸] the simple, unhewn log remained intact, who would carve a sacrificial vessel from it? ... The [殘樸] carving of the unhewn log into [器] instruments is the fault of the craftsman; the impairment of the Way and integrity with humaneness and righteousness is the error of the sage. (9)
- Liezi "came to believe that he had barely begun to learn. ... He took no sides in affairs and [彫琢復朴] whittled himself back to the simplicity of the unhewn log. Clodlike, he stood alone in his physical form. Sealed off against perplexity, in this manner he remained whole to the end." (7)
- "I have heard it said, 'After all the carving and chiseling, [復歸於朴] Return to the simplicity of the unhewn log'." (20)

Another Zhuangzi chapter uses this term fupu 復朴 "return to simplicity".

- If you were to meet someone who understands great plainness, who subscribes to nonaction and [復朴] returns to the simplicity of the unhewn log, who embodies his nature and embraces his spirit, so as to wander through the common world, you would really be surprised! (12)

== See also ==
- Buddhist ethics
- Tabula rasa
- Ziran
