= Ziran =

Key concept in Taoism and East Asian Buddhism

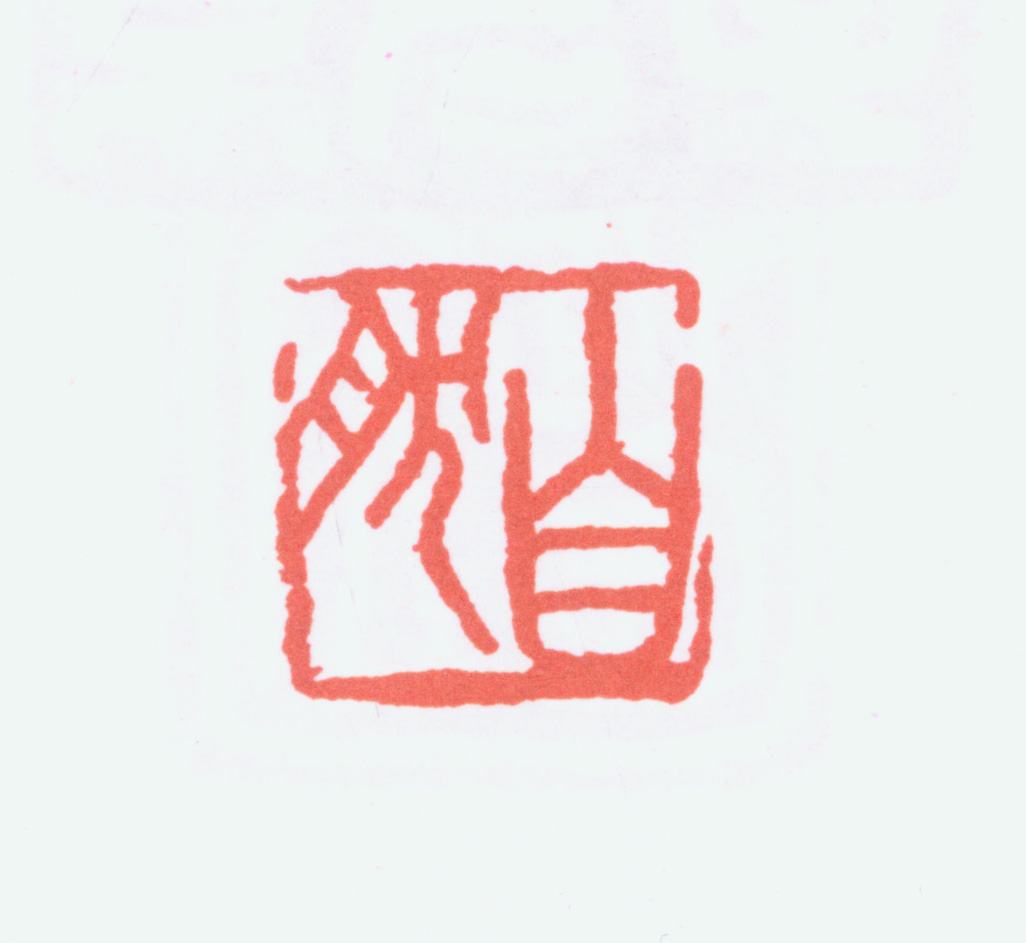
- Seal of ziran

Chinese name
- Chinese: 自然
Transcriptions
Standard Mandarin
- Hanyu Pinyin: zìrán
- Bopomofo: ㄗˋ ㄖㄢˊ
- Wade–Giles: tzŭ^{4}-jan^{2}
- IPA: [tsɨ̂.ɻǎn]
Yue: Cantonese
- Yale Romanization: jihyìhn
- Jyutping: zi6 jin4
- IPA: [tsi˨.jin˩]

Vietnamese name
- Vietnamese alphabet: tự nhiên

Korean name
- Hangul: 자연
Transcriptions
- Revised Romanization: jayeon
- McCune–Reischauer: chayŏn

Japanese name
- Kanji: 自然
- Kana: じねん, しぜん
Transcriptions
- Romanization: jinen, shizen

Ziran, also rendered in the Wade-Giles romanization as tzu-jan, is a key concept in Taoism and East Asian Buddhism that literally means 'of its own' or 'by itself' and thus "naturally; natural; spontaneously; freely; in the course of events; of course; doubtlessly."

== Etymology ==
This Chinese word is a two-character compound of zì (自; 'self', 'oneself', 'from', 'since') and rán (然; 'right', 'correct', 'so', 'yes'), which is used as a -ran suffix marking adjectives or adverbs (roughly corresponding to English -ly). According to the Shuo Wen lexicon, the character 自 zi means "nose." In Chinese culture, the nose (or zi) is a common metaphor for a person's point of view.

== Ziran in Daoism ==
Ziran is a central concept in Daoism, closely tied to the practice of wuwei (non-action). Ziran refers to a state of "just-so-ness" or "as-it-is-ness," a quality of naturalness and spontaneity which can be seen as a specific personal virtue, as well as a description of the unfolding of natural processes. The term ziran first appears in early Daoist sources, like the Dao De Jing (chapters 17, 23, 25, 51, 64), the Zhuangzi and the Taipingjing. Early Daoist sources depict sages who cultivate ziran by abandoning unnatural and contrived influences, returning to an entirely natural, spontaneous state. Ziran is thus related to developing an "altered sense of human nature and of nature per se".

=== In early Daoist works ===
The Dao De Jing (DDJ) contains various passages which mention ziran, such as the following:

(Chapter 25): The Dao is great, heaven is great, earth is great, and the king is also great. In the country there are four great things, and the king sits as one. People are ruled by the earth, the earth is ruled by heaven, and the Dao is ruled by itself (ziran).

According to Wang Bi’s commentary and the Heshanggong commentary, ziran here refers to the very nature of the Dao. In another other passage, the DDJ uses the term to describe how actions happen spontaneously in a well ruled kingdom:

Merits were achieved and matters were finished smoothly, even though the people said we are this by ourselves (ziran).

Other passages of the DDJ discuss the ethical side of ziran, indicating how true virtue is not something that occurs through education or through unnaturally forcing people to be virtuous:

Honoring the Dao and revering virtue, there is no order for this but this is always so by itself (ziran).

Ziran is also the way of the sages, which coincides with the meaning of non-action (wuwei), as described in this further passage from chapter 64:

With this the sage wants not wanting, does not value rare treasures; he learns non-learning. He returns to the places where others have passed by; he is able to help all things as they are (ziran), while in fact taking no action.

In the Zhuangzi meanwhile, ziran only appears twice in the inner chapters. In one passage in chapter seven, ziran is described thus:

Let your heart enjoy simplicity, have your essence be one with indifference, follow things themselves as they are [ziran] without placing yourself among them, and the world will be governed well.

According to Robert James King, in this passage, the term refers to "things of this world, in that their characteristics dictate the correct order of the world around us, and a ruler may only need to pay attention to these and let them be as they are in order to correctly rule." In the late Han religious Daoist text called Taipingjing (Scripture of Great Peace) the term ziran takes on a more cosmological and metaphysical significance, one which would influence later Daoist philosophy. In one passage, the text states:

Heaven fears the Dao, the Dao fears nature (ziran). Heaven fearing the Dao is that heaven holds the ultimate deeds. The Dao removes those deeds that are not of this, this being the destruction and corruption of the way of heaven. With the corruption and destruction of heaven, there danger and death, and there will be no restoring of law and order again. Therefore, nature (ziran) makes heaven and earth protect the Dao, act with the Dao without being negligent, then ying and yang both spread, both come together, and both are born. The Dao fears nature (ziran) is that if the way of heaven is not based on nature (ziran) then it is not possible to form things. Therefore, the myriad of things are all based on nature to be formed, and without nature they will form with difficulty.

In this text, ziran is seen as a natural principle that shapes the creation of the natural, being equal to or even beyond the Dao itself. This view of ziran as a creative primordial principle or law can also be seen in the following quote from the Great Peace:

The primordial energy with nature (ziran) and the energy of supreme harmony spread together, they together with their power and make their essence one, at this time the universe is chaotic and there is nothing that has shape. These three energies come together in to one and together they give birth to heaven and earth.

According to King then, the Taipingjing sees ziran as representing a kind of natural law essential for the creation of the world. It is also essential for government and for sages to revere and to respect.

=== In Neo-Daoism ===
In Neo-Daoist (Xuanxue) philosophy, the term ziran becomes even more central. For the key Xuanxue thinker Wang Bi, ziran refers to the ultimate nature, that which is both the true reality of the natural world as also the ultimate nature of humanity, which are the same "just-so-ness." Wang also notes that ziran is not a thing or a creator deity, but a concept referring to the ultimate, the nature of the Dao itself, which is the source of all things. Thus in his commentary to the DDJ, Wang Bi writes that ziran, that which is "self-so," "is a term [that we use] to speak of that which has no designation; it is an expression that seeks to lay bare [the meaning of] the ultimate." Regarding the nature of sagehood, Wang Bi argues that sages do not artificially transform themselves, nor do they lack ordinary human emotions. Instead, the sage is merely someone who effortlessly (wuwei) abides in ziran in a simple manner, allowing all things to follow their natural course, and thus imitating the growths of uncarved wood. This type of natural behavior is ideal for all forms of activity, from ruling a nation to running a family.

The ideal of ziran was further promoted by later Daoists such as Ji Kang (223–262, or 224–263) and the other “Seven Worthies of the Bamboo Grove”. Like Wang Bi, Ji Kang held there was a natural order to all things, underpinned by the natural unfolding of vital energies (qi). Through self-cultivation, Ji held one could enhance one's energies and lifespan as long as it followed the ways of nature. He also applied ziran to ethical cultivation. For Ji, moral purity was best achieved through abandoning self-interest and calculations about self-benefit. In this one, could be completely authentic about one's feelings and intentions.

Guo Xiang (d. 312) is another key Neo-Daoist figure who was influential in the development of the concept of ziran. Unlike Wang Bi, who emphasized non-being, Guo Xiang emphasized ziran, which he glosses as spontaneous “self-production” (zi sheng) and “self-transformation” (zi hua or du hua). For Guo Xiang, ziran is the most fundamental reality. Thus at the ontological basis of all things is being "so of itself," which is also in everything as its real nature. As Guo writes in his Commentary to the Zhuangzi: “Generally, we may know the causes of certain things and affairs near to us. But tracing their origin to the ultimate end, we find that without any cause, they of themselves come to be what they are. Being so of themselves, we can no longer question the reason or cause of their being, but should accept them as they are.” This applies not just to nature, but to civilization. All the norms and rites of a society also flow naturally and spontaneously from nature's ziran.

== In Chan Buddhism ==
Within Chinese Buddhism, ziran initially appears in pre-Chan materials. It can be found in the writings of the monk Daosheng (c. 360–434), who identified ziran with buddha-nature. Daosheng was well known for having defended an early doctrine of sudden awakening. According to Daosheng, enlightenment is sudden or without stages as ultimate reality is self-so (ziran) and does not admit of any gradations. As ultimate reality is indivisible, it can only be grasped by an equally indivisible means, with its ontological nature dictating its epistemological mode. Daosheng's preface to the Nirvāṇa Sūtra states:

The true principle is tzu-jan [Taoist naturalness, spontaneity; Buddhist suchness]. Enlightenment occurs when one is mysteriously united with it. Since the truth allows no variance, how can enlightenment involve stages? The unchanging essence is always quiescent and shining [chao ‘reflecting’, as a mirror does]. It is only because of the delusions obscuring it that it appears to be beyond our reach.

Ziran was later taken up in Chan Buddhist sources as well. For example, in the Xiuxin yao lun, after providing an analogy in which buddha-nature is likened to the sun hidden behind the clouds of false thoughts, Hongren goes on to give the analogy of a mirror: when its dust has been removed, its nature, or brightness, becomes manifest naturally (ziran). (Note: There are variations among the different versions of this text in its original manuscripts. Several contain the compound chien-hsing here, "see the [Buddha] Nature." However, manuscript P3559 has tzu-jan ming hsien, "naturally the brightness is manifested," while the Korean text has the similar ming tzu-jan hsien.) The teachings of Shenhui, the famous Southern School proponent of sudden enlightenment, contain references to ziran as well. According to Yanagida Seizan, Shenhui's understanding of no-thought (wunian) as sudden awakening is based on the notion of a "natural knowledge" (自然知; ziran zhi), or "original knowledge" (本知; ben zhi). Shenhui also speaks of a "natural wisdom" (自然智; ziran zhi), or "wisdom that occurs naturally from on top of the essence" (從體上有自然智; cong ti shang you ziran zhi). (Note: Liebenthal gives svayambhūjñāna as a Sanskrit equivalent of natural wisdom.)

Shenhui criticized Buddhist monks who held to causes and conditions without acknowledging naturalness (自然; ziran), while also criticizing Taoists who held to naturalness without acknowledging causes and conditions. When pressed as to what the naturalness of the Buddhists and the causes and conditions of the Taoists might be, Shenhui responds that Buddhist naturalness refers to the fundamental nature of sentient beings, as well as to the "natural wisdom and teacherless wisdom" spoken of in the sutras; while the Taoists' causes and conditions refers to the teaching that "the Way gives birth to the one, the one gives birth to the two, the two gives birth to the three, and from the three are born the myriad things" found in the Tao Te Ching.

According to Henrik Sorensen, one of the most salient features of the Xin Ming (Mind Inscription) and Jueguan lun (Treatise on Cutting Off Contemplation), two texts associated with the Oxhead School of Chan, is their "taoistic" flavor. He observes the appearance in these texts of concepts commonly found in Taoism, such as wuwei, and the valuation of spontaneity, ziran, over the vinaya, or Buddhist disciplinary code. Sorensen points out, however, that this should not be taken to mean that the Oxhead School was a kind of synthesis of Neo-Taoism and Chan Buddhism, but simply that the Oxhead School expressed the "practical realization of universal emptiness" of Chinese Madhyamaka partly in Taoist terminology.

Ziran occurs twice in the Xin Ming, both times in connection with brightness (明; míng):

Without unifying, without dispersing
Neither quick nor slow
Bright, peaceful and naturally so [明寂自然; míng jì zìrán]
It cannot be reached by words

And also:

Do not extinguish ordinary feeling
Only teach putting opinions to rest
When opinions are no more, the heart ceases
When heart is no more, practice is cut off
There is no need to prove the Void
It is naturally bright and penetrating [自然明徹; zìrán míng chè] (Note: Compare with the following, attributed to Baozhi: "Seekers clinging to method sitting in meditation are like silkworms spitting out thread binding themselves. The essence of reality is originally completely clear [明; míng]; when the sickness is healed, what is the need to cling to the medicine?")

Additionally, ziran can be found in the famous Xinxin Ming (Faith-Mind Inscription), a text which bears a close similarity to the Xin Ming (Mind Inscription). According to Dusan Pajin, this work contains influences from Taoism. For example, he notes the inclusion in the text of the term ziran, which Pajin says "has a completely Taoist meaning." Pajin writes that this aligns with the Chan tendency, influenced by Taoism, "to stress spontaneity, at the expense of rules, or discipline." The Xinxin Ming says, "The essence of the Great Way is spaciousness / It is neither easy nor difficult / Small views of foxy doubts / Are too hasty or too late / Attach to them, the measure will be lost / Certain to enter on a deviant path / Letting go of them, it goes naturally [放之自然; fàng zhī zìrán]." Although the Xinxin Ming is traditionally attributed to the third Chan patriarch Sengcan (d. 606?), this is not taken seriously by scholarship, and both it and the slightly earlier Xin Ming have been associated with the Oxhead School. Both are likely products of the eighth or early ninth century.

Naturalness appears in another text which exhibits connections with the Oxhead School known as the Baozang lun (Treasure Store Treatise). For instance: "When body and mind are both gone, numinous wisdom alone remains. When the sphere of existence and nonexistence is destroyed, and the abode of subject and object is obliterated, there is only the naturalness of the dharma-realm radiating resplendent functions, yet without any coming into being." According to Robert Sharf, this text contains influences from the Chongxuan School of Taoism.

Ziran also occurs in material attributed to the Liang dynasty Buddhist figure Baozhi. For example: "The uncontrived Great Way is natural and spontaneous [自然; ziran]; you don't need to use your mind to figure it out." (Note: Alternative translation by Randolph Whitfield: "Wuwei, the great Dao, self-existent [自然; ziran] No use to weigh it with the heart") According to Jinhua Jia, although a number of Chan teachings, including this, have been attributed to Baozhi of the Liang, these are likely products of the Hongzhou school of Chan, which flourished during the Tang dynasty. Ziran can be found in the teachings of Huangbo Xiyun of the Hongzhou School as well. For example: "Once body and mind are spontaneous [自然; ziran], you will reach the Way and know the mind." And:

If you leave behind all dharmas that are subject to existence and nonexistence, your mind will become like the orb of the sun that is always present in the sky, its radiance shining naturally without [making any effort to] shine [光明自然不照而照; guāngmíng zìrán bù zhào ér zhào]. Isn’t that a situation where you should conserve your strength?

According to Jinhua Jia, the view of the Hongzhou School was that "The spontaneous state of human mind is the Way or the state of enlightenment. Chan practice involves nothing more than keeping the mind in a complete state and releasing it from all artificially imposed restraints, free to act naturally and spontaneously." The Chan master Daowu, who studied under Mazu Daoyi, founder of the Hongzhou School, said: "Give rein to your innate nature and its transcendental roamings. Act according to the exegencies of circumstances in perfect freedom and without any attachment. Just do nothing else but follow the dictates of your ordinary heart-mind."

Guifeng Zongmi of the Heze school of Chan was critical of the Hongzhou School for its emphasis on spontaneity, ziran, as he felt this undermined ethical and religious cultivation. Like the Hongzhou school, Zongmi advocated for sudden awakening. However, he argued that sudden awakening must still be followed up by a "gradual cultivation" in which one's lingering habitual tendencies are progressively eliminated in stages, as the practitioner integrates the experience of sudden awakening into every aspect of their life. According to Zongmi, because the Hongzhou School believed that "Simply allowing the mind to act spontaneously is cultivation," they were at risk of erasing the distinction between enlightenment and delusion altogether and liable to fall into antinomianism. Nonetheless, Zongmi himself maintained that the nature of mind was characterized by an awareness, or knowing (知; zhi), which is spontaneous. As he writes in the Chan Prolegomenon:

The mind of voidness and calm is a spiritual Knowing that never darkens. It is precisely this Knowing of voidness and calm that is your true nature. No matter whether you are deluded or awakened, mind from the outset is spontaneously Knowing. [Knowing] is not produced by conditions, nor does it arise in dependence on any sense object. (Note: See also Peter Gregory's translation of a parallel passage from Zongmi's Chan Chart: "The Mind which is empty and tranquil is numinously aware (ling-chih) and unobscured (pu-mei). This very Awareness which is empty and tranquil is the empty tranquil Mind transmitted previously by Bodhidharma. Whether deluded or enlightened, the Mind is intrinsically aware in and of itself. It does not come into existence dependent upon conditions nor does it arise because of sense objects." "Aware in and of itself" (or "spontaneously Knowing") is 自知 zizhi in the CBETA editions of both the Chan Prolegomenon and the Chan Chart.)

For Zongmi, this knowing or awareness is a "direct manifestation of the very essence itself" (t'ang-t'i piao-hsien). He identifies this with the "intrinsic functioning of the self-nature," contrasting it with the "responsive functioning-in-accord-with-conditions" which he connects with psycho-physical operations such as speech, discrimination, and bodily movements. Where the latter type of functioning is likened to the appearance in response to stimuli of myriad images reflected in a mirror, the intrinsic functioning is likened to the mirror's luminous reflectivity itself, which is not changed by the images it reflects.

According to Visvader and Doub, the Chan view is that true spontaneity is acting in accord with one's innate nature. Therefore, without awakening, i.e. without the realization of what this innate nature is, whatever action one takes which one deems to be spontaneous will necessarily be a kind of pseudo-spontaneity. They write, "Merely because one does not deliberate before one acts does not mean that one's actions come from the original mind; there are all sorts of other levels of one's mind that can produce this kind of behavior."

== Contemporary interpretations ==
Ziran has been interpreted and reinterpreted in a numerous ways over time. Most commonly, it has been seen as the greatest spiritual concept that was followed by lesser concepts of the Tao, Heaven, Earth, and Man in turn, based on the traditional translation and interpretation of Chapter 25 of the Tao Te Ching.

Qingjie James Wang's more modern translation eliminates the logical flaw that arises when one considers that to model oneself after another entity may be to become less natural, to lose the 'as-it-isness' that ziran refers to. Wang reinterprets the words of Chapter 25 to be instructions to follow the model set by Earth's being Earth, by Heaven's being Heaven, and by the Tao being the Tao; each behaving perfectly in accordance with ziran. This interpretation reaffirms that the base nature of the Tao is one of complete naturalness.

Wing-Chuek Chan provides another translation of 'ziran': "It is so by virtue of its own". This brings up ziran's link to another Taoist belief, specifically that the myriad things exist because of the qualities that they possess, not because they were created by any being to fulfill a purpose or goal. The only thing that a being must be when it exists in accordance with ziran is ultimately natural, unaffected by artificial influences.

Ziran and Tianran are related concepts. Tianran refers to a thing created by heaven that is ultimately untouched by human influence, a thing fully characterized by ziran. The two terms are sometimes interchangeably used. It can be said that by gaining ziran, a person grows nearer to a state of tianran.

Ziran can also be looked at from under Buddha's influence, "non-substantial". It is then believed to mean 'having no nature of its own'. In this aspect it is seen as a synonym of real emptiness.

D. T. Suzuki, in a brief article penned in 1959, makes the suggestion of ziran as an aesthetic of action: "Living is an act of creativity demonstrating itself. Creativity is objectively seen as necessity, but from the inner point of view of Emptiness it is 'just-so-ness,' (ziran). It literally means 'byitself-so-ness,' implying more inner meaning than 'spontaneity' or 'naturalness'".

== See also ==
- Zhenren, a true person i.e. a master of the Tao
- Pu (Taoism), a metaphor for naturalness
- Tathātā or "suchness" in Mahayana Buddhism
- Sahaja, "coemergent; spontaneously or naturally born together" in Indian and Tibetan Buddhism
- True Will, a concept in Thelema
- Rta, cosmic principle of natural order
- Svabhava, concept of "one's own nature"
