= Deng Yi =

Deng Yi may refer to:

- Deng Yi (government official) (born 2nd century), Chinese government official in the Eastern Han dynasty
- Deng Yi (racing driver) (born 2002), Chinese racing driver
