= Xin Ming =

Chinese text of Chan Buddhism, attributed to Niutou Farong (594–657)

The Xin Ming, or "Mind Inscription" (Chinese: 心銘), also rendered in the Wade-Giles romanization as Hsin ming, is a Chan Buddhist text attributed to Niutou Farong (牛頭法融; 594–657), whom the Oxhead School regarded as its founder. The Xin Ming can be found in chapter thirty of the Jingde chuandeng lu. It is not to be confused with the famous Xinxin Ming, or "Faith-Mind Inscription" (also found in chapter thirty of the Jingde chuandeng lu), which is a related but separate text.

== Question of authorship and relationship to other texts ==
Although attributed to Niutou Farong (牛頭法融; 594–657), the Xin Ming can be grouped together with a number of early Chan texts which were probably composed sometime during the eighth or ninth century. These texts exhibit a similarity of lexical terms and doctrinal content, and include: the Jueguan lun (絶觀論, 'Treatise on Cutting Off Contemplation'), the Wuxin lun (無心論, 'Treatise on No-mind'), the Xinwang Ming (心王銘, 'Mind King Inscription'), and the Xinxin Ming (信心銘, 'Faith-Mind Inscription').

John McRae doubts that the Xin Ming can be attributed to Niutou Farong. According to Henrik Sorensen, although no definitive proof exists that the Xin Ming was authored by Niutou Farong, a number of points, as well as style and content, allow for the text to be associated with Farong and the Oxhead School. Sorensen also observes the similarity between it and the Jueguan lun, and says, "there seems to be little doubt that they are both the product, if not by the same author, then at least by followers of the same type of Ch'an doctrine." According to Yanagida Seizan, the Jueguan lun is either by Farong or one of his close disciples.

Sorensen further notes the close affinity, both in content and style, between the Xin Ming and the famous Xinxin Ming (Faith-Mind Inscription). Additionally, Robert Sharf points out that the well-known Xinxin Ming closely resembles the Xin Ming and it has been suggested by some scholars that the Xinxin Ming was intended as an "improvement" on the earlier Xin Ming. Although the famous Xinxin Ming is traditionally attributed to the third Chan patriarch Sengcan, this is not taken seriously by scholarship, and both it and the earlier Xin Ming are considered to be associated with the Oxhead School.

== Excerpts and analysis of contents ==
Sharf observes that the Xin Ming and the slightly later, and more famous, Xinxin Ming (Faith-Mind Inscription), bear a close resemblance to each other, and points to the Oxhead School associations of both texts. A term that occurs in both works is self-illumination (自照, zizhao), and in the Xin Ming one finds the following:

Bodhi exists originally
It has no need of being preserved
Afflictions have no intrinsic existence
They do not need to be eradicated
Numinous knowing is self-illuminated [自照, zizhao]
The myriad dharmas return to Thusness
There is no return, no receiving
Cut off contemplation, forget preservation (Note: See here for the same term, self-illumination (自照, zizhao), in the related Xinxin Ming (Faith-Mind Inscription): "Nothing remains Nothing is harboured in memory Void, clear, self-illumining [自照, zizhao] The heart-strength does not struggle It is not the place of calculated thinking Difficult for understanding and sentiment to fathom In the Dharma realm of true Suchness There is no other, no self")

One can also find in this passage a rejection of the notion of "maintaining" or "preserving" (守, shou). According to Kuno, the Xin Ming exhibits opposition to "maintaining mind" (守心, shouxin), a contemplative practice of the Northern School. Henrik Sorensen likewise observes that the Xin Ming contains references to, and rejections of, the practice of shouxin. For example: "By grasping the mind and maintaining [守, shou] stillness, one will still not be able to leave behind the sickness (of clinging)." Commenting on the points in common between the Xin Ming and the Xinxin Ming, Dusan Pajin observes the similarity between the Xin Ming's admonition against using the mind to maintain tranquility and a stanza in the Xinxin Ming in which one finds: "To use the mind to hold the mind / Is it not a great mistake?" (Note: Compare with the words of Zhitong in the Platform Sutra: "All [deliberate] activation of cultivation is false activity. To guard one’s abiding is not true serenity.")

Sorensen notes the presence of terms commonly associated with Daoism in the Xin Ming, such as wuwei (無為, 'non-doing'):

Enjoying the Dao is calming
Wandering at ease in the truly real
Nothing to do [無為, wuwei], nothing to attain
Relying on nothing, appearing naturally

Sorensen also observes the appearance in the Xin Ming of the Daoist term ziran (自然, 'naturalness, spontaneity'). This term occurs twice in the text, both times in connection with brightness (明, míng):

Without unifying, without dispersing
Neither quick nor slow
Bright, peaceful and naturally so [明寂自然, míng jì zìrán]
It cannot be reached by words

And also:

Do not extinguish ordinary feeling
Only teach putting opinions to rest
When opinions are no more, the heart ceases
When heart is no more, practice is cut off
There is no need to prove the Void
It is naturally bright and penetrating [自然明徹, zìrán míng chè] (Note: For another example of the terms wuwei and ziran in a Chan Buddhist source, see the following, attributed to Baozhi: "Wuwei, the great Dao, self-existent [自然, ziran] No use to weigh it with the heart" Alternative translation by Cleary: "The uncontrived Great Way is natural and spontaneous; you don't need to use your mind to figure it out." According to Jinhua Jia, although a number of Chan verses, including the above, have been attributed to the Liang dynasty figure Baozhi, these are likely products of the Hongzhou school, which flourished during the Tang dynasty.)

== English translations ==
The Xin Ming has been translated into English by Henrik H. Sorensen in the Journal of Chinese Philosophy Vol.13, 1986, pp. 101–120; and also by Chan Master Sheng Yen in Song of Mind: Wisdom from the Zen Classic Xin Ming, Shambhala Publications 2004. See also Sheng Yen, The Poetry of Enlightenment, Poems by Ancient Chan Masters, pages 31–43, Shambhala Publications, 2006. Most recently, it has been translated into English by Randolph S. Whitfield in Records of the Transmission of the Lamp, Volume 8, Chan Poetry and Inscriptions, pages 89–95, Books on Demand, 2020.
