= Niaoke Daolin =

Tang dynasty Chan Buddhist monk

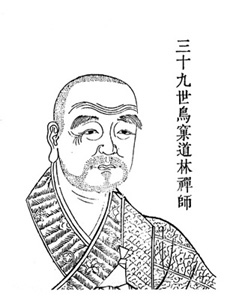
- Chinese: 鳥窠道林

Information
- Attributes: Chan Buddhism
- Birth name: Pan
- Birthplace: Fuyang, Hangzhou

Niaoke Daolin (also spelt Niaoge Daolin, Chinese: 鳥窠道林; 741–824) was a Chan Buddhist monk who lived in Tang dynasty. He reportedly practiced sitting meditation while perched on the branches of a coniferous tree, and this earned him the nickname "Master Bird's Nest". He was a famous disciple of Jingshan Daoqin in the Niutou lineage of Chinese Chan Buddhism.

== Life ==
Niaoke Daolin was born in 741 in Fuyang, Hangzhou with the family name Pan. His mother, whose maiden name was Zhu, had a dream of the rays of the sun entering her mouth, which led to her conceiving. When Niaoke was born, a strange fragrance filled the room, and he was given the name "Fragrant Light". He left his home at the age of nine and received the full precepts at Guoyuan Temple in Jing (Jingling, Hubei) when he was twenty-one years old. Later, he went to Ximing Monastery in Chang'an to study the Avataṃsaka Sūtra and the Śāstra on the Arising of Faith (Śraddhotpada Śāstra, Aśvagoa) under the guidance of Dharma teacher Fuli. Fuli also introduced him to the "Song of the Real and Unreal" and taught him meditation practices.

Niaoke once asked Fuli, "Can you explain how to meditate and exercise the heart?". Fuli remained silent for a long time, so Niaoke bowed three times and left. Around that time, Emperor Taizong of Tang summoned Jingshan Daoqin, the first teacher of the Empire, to the Imperial Palace. Niaoke visited him and received the True Dharma.

After returning south, Niaoke stopped at Yongfu Temple on Mount Gu (Zhejiang), where a stupa was dedicated to the Pratyekabuddhas. Monks and laypeople were gathered for a Dharma talk, and Niaoke entered the hall with his walking stick, which made a clicking sound. Taoguang, a Dharma teacher from the Lingyin Temple, asked him, "Why do you make noise in this Dharma meeting?". Niaoke replied, "Without making a sound, how would anyone know it's a Dharma meeting?".

Later, on Qinwang Mountain, the master settled himself in an old pine tree with lush foliage and branches shaped like a lid, which was why the people of that time called him Chan Master Niaoke (Bird's Nest). Magpies also made their nest by his side and became quite tame through the intimacy with a human, which is why he was also referred to as the Magpie Nest Monk.

He has a special way of teaching his disciples:

One day, the master's attendant, Huitong, expressed his wish to leave. "Where are you headed?" asked the master.

"I left my worldly life for the sake of the Dharma, but the venerable monk has not given me any instruction. So now I am wandering to study the Buddha-dharma," replied Huitong.

"If there is such a thing as Buddha-dharma," said the master, "I have a little here," and he plucked a hair from his robe, blowing it away. Suddenly, Huitong understood the profound meaning behind it.

On the tenth day of the second month in the fourth year of Changqing's reign period (824), the master uttered his final words to his attendant, saying "Now my time is up." After speaking, he sat on his cushion and peacefully died. At the time of his passing, the master was eighty-four years old and had been a monk for sixty-three years.

== Notable dialogues with Bai Juyi ==
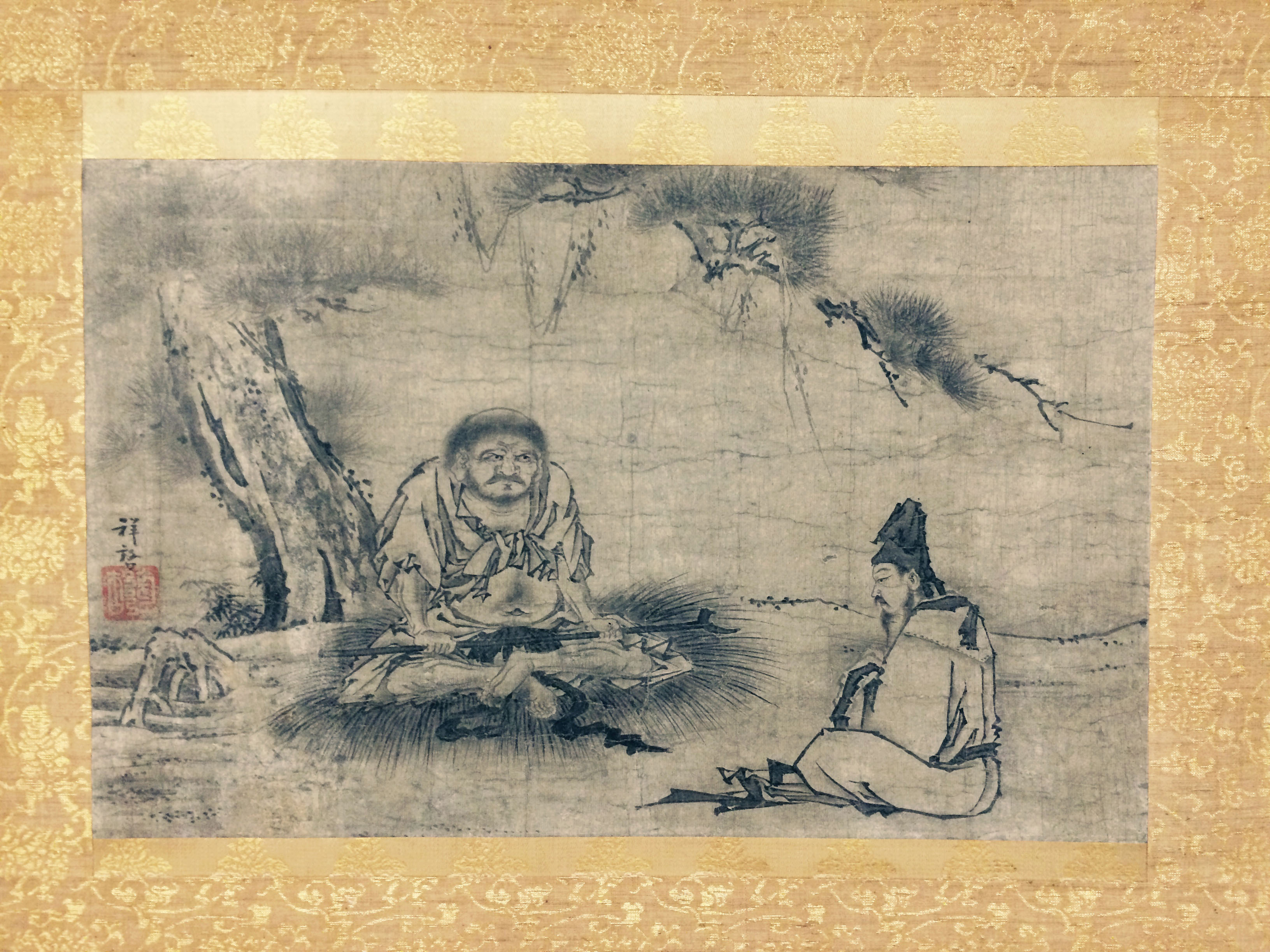
"Zen Encounter (Niaoke Daolin and Bai Juyi)" by Kenkō Shōkei (16th century)

Bai Juyi, a famous poet and government official, was a student of Niaoke Daolin and once visited him while he was meditating in a tree.

Bai asked, "Master, isn't it dangerous up there?"

The master replied, "Isn't your position more dangerous?"

Later, the master was asked by Bai Juyi, "What is the essence of the teaching?"

The master replied, "Not to commit evils, but to practise all good, and to keep the heart pure. This is the teaching of the Buddhas."

Bai Juyi said, "Yes, even a three-year-old child knows this concept."

The master said, "A three-year-old can say it, but an eighty-year-old man cannot do it."

== Journey to the West ==
A mysterious character, Zen Master Wuchao (烏巢禪師), believed to be based on Niaoke Daolin, appears in the Chinese classical novel Journey to the West as an enlightened Zen monk who practices in the firewood nest located at Futu Mountain (浮屠山).

After Tang Sanzang accepted Zhu Bajie as his disciple, they traveled through high mountains and dense forests for about a month. While passing by Futu Mountain, Bajie recognized the area and introduced it to Sanzang, explaining that a Zen master named Wuchao resided on the mountain and practiced his teachings there. Bajie also shared that Zen Master Wuchao had once wanted to accept him as a disciple, but he had already promised Guanyin Bodhisattva to become Sanzang's apprentice, so he had declined the offer.

They saw that there was a firewood nest on the fragrant juniper tree, surrounded by elk holding flowers, and apes offering fruits. Sanzang went under the tree, and the Zen master left the nest to meet Sanzang. Upon encountering the group, Zen Master Wuchao had never met Sanzang before but was able to recognize him instantly. Interestingly, he was not aware of the renowned Monkey King but recognized Zhu Bajie instead. Zen Master Wuchao imparted the teachings of a volume of Prajñāpāramitāhṛdaya (The Heart Sūtra) to Sanzang, who listened to it only once but remembered it forever. Tang Sanzang's recitation of the Prajñāpāramitāhṛdaya is mentioned multiple times in subsequent chapters, including Chapter 20, Chapter 32, Chapter 43, and more.

The novel Seven Great Sages (七大聖) describes the origin of Zen Master Wuchao, who is said to have been transformed by the last remaining three-legged golden crow left behind by Hou Yi after he shot down nine suns.
