= Xinxin Ming =

Chinese poem of Chan Buddhism (6th century)

Xinxin Ming (alternate spellings Xin Xin Ming or Xinxinming) (Chinese: 信心銘; Pīnyīn: Xìnxīn Míng; Wade–Giles: Hsin Hsin Ming; Rōmaji: Shinjinmei), meaning literally: "Faith-Mind Inscription," is a poem attributed to the Third Chinese Chán Patriarch Jianzhi Sengcan (Chinese: 鑑智僧璨; Pīnyīn: Jiànzhì Sēngcàn; Wade–Giles: Chien-chih Seng-ts'an; Romaji: Kanchi Sōsan) and one of the earliest Chinese Chan expressions of the Buddhist mind training practice. It is located in section T2010 of the Taisho Tripitaka.

The poem expresses the practice of taking pleasant and unpleasant life experiences with a sense of equanimity. Broadly speaking, the Xinxin Ming deals with the principles and practice of non-duality, that is, with the application of nonduality and the results of its practice. As an early expression of Chan Buddhism, the Inscription on Faith in Mind reveals the Buddhist missionary use of expedient means (upaya) in China by adapting Daoist terminology to the Buddhist context of awakening. It also draws on the Wisdom sutras as well as the Avatamsaka Sutra and Lankavatara Sutra to express the essential unity of opposites and the basic nature of emptiness (śūnyatā). (Note: The early great proponent of the Buddhist analysis of emptiness was Nagarjuna (c. 150–250 AD) (Chinese: 龍樹).) The Xinxin Ming has been much beloved by Chan (Zen) practitioners for over a thousand years and is still studied in Western Zen circles.

== Authorship ==
Although Sengcan has traditionally been attributed as the author, modern scholars believe that the work was written well after Sengcan's death, probably during the Tang dynasty (Chinese: 唐朝; pinyin: Tángcháo) (618–907) (Dumoulin, p 97). Some scholars note the similarity with a poem called the Xin Ming (Mind Inscription or Song of Mind) attributed to Niu-t'ou Fa-jung (594–657) of the Oxhead school of Chan and have speculated that the Xinxin Ming is an abridged version of the Mind Inscription. Sharf observes that the Xinxin Ming may have been intended as an "improvement" on the earlier Xin Ming (Mind Inscription). The Xinxin Ming can be found in chapter 30 of the Transmission of the Lamp (Chinese: 景德傳燈錄; Pinyin: Jǐngdé Chuándēng-lù; Wade–Giles: Ching-te Ch'uanteng-lu; Japanese: Keitoku Dentō-roku).

== Themes ==
Bernard Faure observes that the Xinxin Ming exhibits criticism of the Northern School practice known as "maintaining the one" or "guarding the one" (shouyi 守一), which was falling out of fashion with the eclipse of Northern Chan. Such criticism can be seen in the following passage from the Xinxin Ming: "If there is even a trace of ‘is’ or ‘is not,’ the mind will be lost in confusion. Although the two comes from the One, do not guard even this One." It has also been pointed out that the Xinxin Ming closely resembles the short Oxhead School work, the Xin Ming (Mind Inscription), a text taken to contain criticisms of the similar Northern School practice of "maintaining (or guarding) the mind" (shouxin 守心) by some scholars, such as Kuno Hōryū and Henrik Sorensen.

Likewise, Dusan Pajin observes that both the Xinxin Ming and the Xin Ming contain similar admonitions against using the mind to hold the mind and using the mind to maintain tranquility. Pajin also points out that the Xinxin Ming exhibits influences from Daoism and he notes the inclusion in the text of such terms as wuwei (non-action), as well as ziran (naturalness, spontaneity), which Pajin says "has a completely Taoist meaning." Pajin writes that this aligns with the Chan tendency, influenced by Daoism, "to stress spontaneity, at the expense of rules, or discipline." Pajin also writes that the Xinxin Ming's emphasis on faith in mind could be understood as a Chan response to Pure Land practice in which one puts one's faith in Buddha Amitābha. (Note: From the Chan/Zen point of view, Buddha and Mind are one (即心即佛), as expressed in Mazu's famous dictum "Mind is Buddha." Accordingly, one finds emphasis on taking refuge in one's inner Buddha over outward Buddhas in Chan (see the Platform Sutra of the Sixth Patriarch, 六祖壇經).)

== Meaning of xinxin ==
Xinxin has commonly been interpreted as "faith" or "trust." For example, one translation is "Faith in Mind" (See The Poetry of Enlightenment: Poems by Ancient Ch'an Masters, Ch'an Master Sheng-Yen).

Yoshida Osamu translates xinxin as "faith-mind," and says, "Although xin (faith) and xin (mind) in the conventional sense are concerned respectively with object and subject, in ultimate reality they are not different." Similarly, Joanne Miller writes, "Xinxin refers to the conviction that the searching mind is the object of its own search i.e., buddha nature. In terms of a process or a practice, this faith is the experience of the mind when we experience non-duality. In this state, the trusting mind itself becomes the object of trust." R.H. Blyth also says that the believing mind is not a belief in something. It is not a matter of one thing believing in another. Rather, Blyth quotes the Nirvāṇa Sūtra which says, "The Believing Mind is the Buddha nature." Blyth comments that, "It is perfect because it is single, unique, complete, all-including." (Note: See also the following from Sung Bae Park's Buddhist Faith and Sudden Enlightenment: "Unlike Western theistic religions, which are based on a dualistic subject-object structure, as expressed in the 'faith in ______' construction (e.g. faith in God), the East Asian tradition of Mahāyāna Buddhism is based on a nondual t'i-yung, or 'essence-function' construction. According to East Asian Mahāyāna Buddhism, faith does not require an object; rather, it is a natural function (yung) of one's own (originally enlightened) Mind, understood as t'i, or 'essence.'")

McRae translates xin 信 as "to rely on," noting this entails faith or conviction. However, he also points out, following Yanagida, that in the compound xinxin 信心, the first character can also have a meaning similar to "true," and should be translated along the lines of "perfected." (Note: A reading of the text which translates xinxin as "truthful mind," can be found at: . Because xinxin (信心) usually means "trust", "confidence", or "believing mind", it is often forgotten that xinxin can also be understood as the truthful mind. This is consistent with the traditional view of Buddha nature being there all the time. It just waits to be rediscovered.) He suggests that the title Xinxin Ming be translated either as Inscription on Relying on the Mind or Inscription on the Perfected Mind.

From the Chan/Zen point of view, the true mind is perfect as it is. It is only false views that obscure the true mind's inherent perfection. As the text states,

Any degeneration of your previous practice on emptiness arises because of false perspectives. There is really no need to go after the Truth but there is indeed a need to extinguish biased views. (Note: Chinese: 前空轉變 皆由妄見 不用求真 唯須息見)

Moreover, the passage that follows immediately after explicitly warns against losing the original, true mind:

Do not dwell in the two biased views. Make sure you do not pursue. The moment you think about right and wrong, that moment you unwittingly lose your true mind. (Note: Chinese: 二見不住 慎勿追尋 才有是非 紛然失心)

Whether translated as Faith in Mind, Believing in Mind, Trust in Mind, or The Truthful Mind, the central message of the Xinxin Ming is the same: to point directly to Mind by giving up one-sided views so we can see the One Suchness of reality as it is. (Note: Chinese: 心若不異 萬法一如)

== Excerpts ==
=== Opening verse ===
The opening verse, variously translated, sets out the fundamental principle:

The best way [Great Way, the Tao] is not difficult
It only excludes picking and choosing
Once you stop loving and hating
It will enlighten itself.
(trans. D. Pajin)

Alternatively:

The Perfect Way knows no difficulties
Except that it refuses to make preferences;
Only when freed from hate and love,
It reveals itself fully and without disguise
(trans. by D.T. Suzuki)

And also:

There is nothing difficult about the Great Way,
But avoid choosing!
Only when you neither love nor hate,
Does it appear in all clarity.
(trans. R.H. Blyth, Zen and Zen Classics)

=== Last verse ===
The poem ends with:

Emptiness here, Emptiness there,
but the infinite universe stands always before your eyes.
Infinitely large and infinitely small;
no difference, for definitions have vanished
and no boundaries are seen.
So too with Being
and non-Being.
Don't waste time in doubts and arguments
that have nothing to do with this.
One thing, all things:
move among and intermingle, without distinction.
To live in this realization
is to be without anxiety about non-perfection.
To live in this faith is the road to non-duality,
Because the non-dual is one with the trusting mind.
Words! The Way is beyond language,
for in it there is

no yesterday
no tomorrow
no today.

(trans. Richard B. Clarke)

Alternatively:

One in All,
All in One—
If only this is realized,
No more worry about your not being perfect!

Where Mind and each believing mind are not divided,
And undivided are each believing mind and Mind,
This is where words fail;
For it is not of the past, present, and future.
(trans. D.T. Suzuki)

And also:

One thing is all things;
All things are one thing.
If this is so for you,
There is no need to worry about perfect knowledge.
The believing mind is not dual;
What is dual is not the believing mind.
Beyond all language,
For it there is no past, no present, no future.
(trans. R.H. Blyth, Zen and Zen Classics)
