= Professor of Chinese, University of London =

The Professor of Chinese is the oldest endowed position in Chinese in the United Kingdom. The first professor of Chinese at the University of London was held by Samuel Kidd at the University College London, 1837–1842. However the position was not renewed, and while the matter was still under discussion, Kidd died.

A new position, now held by King's College, was endowed in 1845 by, or at least through the good offices of, Sir George Staunton.

In 1904 this position was merged with a chair of Chinese subsequently endowed at University College London, with a donation from the China Association. In 1916 the position was moved to the newly created School of Oriental and African Studies. Scholars to have held the position include Denis Twitchett (1960–68), D. C. Lau (1970–1978), David Pollard (1979–1989), Hugh Baker (1990–2002), and Michel Hockx (2002–2016).
