= Wu wei =

Concept in Chinese philosophy favouring inaction

Chinese name
- Traditional Chinese: 無為
- Simplified Chinese: 无为
Transcriptions
Standard Mandarin
- Hanyu Pinyin: wúwéi
- Wade–Giles: wu^{2}-wei^{2}
- IPA: [ǔ.wěɪ]
Yue: Cantonese
- Yale Romanization: mòuhwàih
- Jyutping: mou4-wai4
- IPA: [mɔw˩.wɐj˩]

Vietnamese name
- Vietnamese: vô vi

Korean name
- Hangul: 무위
- Hanja: 無爲
Transcriptions
- Revised Romanization: muwi

Japanese name
- Kanji: 無為
- Hiragana: むい
Transcriptions
- Revised Hepburn: mui

Wu wei (traditional Chinese: 無為; simplified Chinese: 无为; pinyin: wúwéi; Jyutping: mou4-wai4) is a concept from ancient Chinese philosophy that literally means not-acting or non-doing, variously interpreted and translated as actionlessness, inaction, or effortless action. In Taoism, it denotes the nature of Tao, meaning that while Tao (the way, path, or flow of nature) is the source of all existence and manifestation of all phenomena, its intrinsic formless essence is that it acts or moves in a silent, invisible, ineffable, often-unnoticed manner that may even seem motionless and effortless. Accordingly, Taoists aspire to live their lives in alignment with such a harmonious state of free flowing and unforced activity. In a political context, it also refers to an ideal form or principle of spontaneous and non-aggressive governance.

Wu wei appears as an idea as early as the Spring and Autumn period, with early literary examples in the Classic of Poetry. It became an important concept in the Confucian Analects, linking a Confucian ethic of practical morality to a state of being which harmonizes intention and action. It would go on to become a central concept in Legalist statecraft and Daoism, in Daoism as a concept emphasizing alignment with the natural Dao in actions and intentions, avoiding force or haste against the natural order.

Sinologist Jean François Billeter describes wu-wei as a "state of perfect knowledge (understanding) of the coexistence of the situation and perceiver, perfect efficaciousness and the realization of a perfect economy of energy".

== Early scholarship ==
The early scholarship of Feng Youlan suggested a distinction between philosophical and religious Daoism. Following him, sinologist Herrlee G. Creel further divided philosophical Daoism into "contemplative Daoism", which emphasized a deep understanding of the nature of the universe; and "purposive Daoism", emphasizing control over phenomena. Accordingly, Creel differentiates wu wei as found in the Zhuangzi and Tao te Ching, respectively as:

1. An "attitude of genuine non-action, motivated by a lack of desire to participate in human affairs" and
2. A "technique by means of which the one who practices it may gain enhanced control of human affairs."

The contemplative Daoism of the Zhuangzi portrays wu wei as a source of serenity, rather than something to help people gain political power. Creel takes the Zhuangzi's idea of wu wei as rooted in its transcendental idea of the Dao, which views life and death as an "indissoluble unity". As such, the ideal of the Zhuangzi is the sage who avoids worldly affairs. Whether seeking gain or fame, the Zhuangzi regards "small" and "superior" men largely the same, inasmuch as they abandon the "normal feelings of men" and "proper human course" in favor of "strange and unnatural endeavors". Although the second idea of wuwei is traditionally said to have been influenced by Laozi, Creel suggests that Daoists might have adopted it from Shen Buhai (400 BCE – c. 337 BCE) as they became interested in rulers' use of power.

While it would be difficult to say in fact whether either Shen Buhai or the Tao te Ching influenced each other, Shen Buhai and the Han Feizi are more evidently a major influence on the Huainanzi's idea of wuwei in the Han dynasty, in the sense of delegating responsibilities to subordinates. Called "rule by non-activity" and strongly advocated by the Han Feizi, during the Han dynasty until the reign of Han Wudi, rulers confined their activity "chiefly to the appointment and dismissal of his high officials". This "conception of the ruler's role as a supreme arbiter, who keeps the essential power firmly in his grasp" while leaving details to ministers, has a "deep influence on the theory and practice of Chinese monarchy", playing a "crucial role in the promotion of the autocratic tradition of the Chinese polity", ensuring the ruler's power and the stability of the polity.

Although the Inner Zhuangzi chapters may precede the Outer Zhuangzi, much of the latter derives from at least the later part of the Warring States period and ridicules Confucian moralization. Only appearing three times in the second half of the Zhuangzi, Creel supposed that early Daoists may have avoided the term for its association with Legalism before ultimately co-opting its governmental sense as well, regarding this as attempted in the Outer Zhuangzi's chapter 13, 天道; Tiāndào; 'Way of Heaven'. In the more "purposive" Daoism of the Daodejing, likely written after the early Zhuangzi, wu wei becomes a major "guiding principle for social and political pursuit", in which the Daoist "seeks to use his power to control and govern the world".

== Confucian development ==
Sinologist Roger T. Ames regards attempts to determine the origin of wu wei as strained speculation. But while Shen Buhai bears a "striking" resemblance to the Tao te Ching, it would still be difficult to date the Tao te Ching back to the time of Confucius, even if it predated the third century BCE. While Shen Buhai's idea of wu wei is already quite different from Confucianism, he did use it in a similar sense of employing ministers.

Apart from Shen Buhai, the Analects of Confucius (Lun-yu) are the only preserved text prior to the Zhuangzi that directly use the term. More modernly, Edward Slingerland believes the idea of wu wei predated the term, dating it back to the era of the Classic of Poetry. With older sinologists more focused on terms, Creel believed that an important clue to the idea of wu wei existed in the Analects.

A saying attributed to Confucius reads: "The Master said, 'Was it not Shun who did nothing and yet ruled well? What did he do? He merely corrected his person ("made himself reverent" – Slingerland) and took his proper position (facing south) as ruler'". The concept of a divine king whose "magic power" (virtue) "regulates everything in the land" (Creel) pervades early Chinese philosophy, particularly "in the early branches of Quietism that developed in the fourth century B.C."

Unable to find his philosopher-king, Confucius placed his hope in virtuous ministers. Apart from the Confucian ruler's "divine essence" (ling) "ensuring the fecundity of his people" and fertility of the soil, Creel notes that he was also assisted by "five servants", who "performed the active functions of government". Xun Kuang's Xunzi, a Confucian adaptation to Qin Legalism, defines the ruler in much the same sense, saying that the ruler "need only correct his person" because the "abilities of the ruler appear in his appointment of men to office": namely, appraising virtue and causing others to perform.

=== Slingerland ===
Slingerland argues wu wei in the Confucian sense has to be attained. But in the Confucian conception of virtue, virtue can only be attained by not consciously trying to attain it. The manifestation of virtue is regarded as a reward by Heaven for following its will – as a power that enables them to establish this will on earth. In this, probably more original sense, wu wei may be regarded as the "skill" of "becoming a fully realized human being", a sense which it shares with Daoism. This "skill" avoids relativity through being linked to a "normative" metaphysical order, making its spontaneity "objective". By achieving a state of wu wei (and taking his proper ritual place), Shun "unifies and orders" the entire world, and finds his place in the "cosmos". Taken as a historical fact demonstrating the viable superiority of Confucianism (or Daoism, for Daoist depictions), wu wei may be understood as a strongly "realist" spiritual-religious ideal, differing from Kantian or Cartesian realism in its Chinese emphasis on practice.

The "object" of wu wei "skill-knowledge" is the Way, which is – to an extent regardless of school – "embodying" the mind to a "normative order existing independently of the minds of the practitioners". The primary example of Confucianism – Confucius at age 7 – displays "mastery of morality" spontaneously, his inclinations being in harmony with his virtue. Confucius considers training unnecessary if one is born loving the Way, as with the disciple Yan Hui. Mencius believed that men are already good, and need only realize it not by trying, but by allowing virtue to realize itself, and coming to love the Way. Training is done to learn to spontaneously love the Way. Virtue is compared with the grain seed (being domesticated) and the flow of water. On the other hand, Xun Kuang considered it possible to attain wu wei only through a long and intensive traditional training.

== Daoist development ==
Following its developments elsewhere, Zhuang Zhou and Laozi turn towards an unadorned "no effort". Laozi, as opposed to carved Confucian jade, advocates a return to the primordial Mother and to become like uncarved wood. He condemns doing and grasping, urging the reader to cognitively grasp oneness (still the mind), reduce desires and the size of the state, leaving human nature untouched. In practice, wu wei is aimed at through behaviour modification; cryptically referenced meditation and more purely physical breathing techniques as in the Guanzi, which includes just taking the right posture. While the modern edition of Guanzi may have been compiled even after the Han Feizi, its contents may be of much earlier origin.

When your body is not aligned,
The inner power will not come.
When you are not tranquil within,
Your mind will not be well ordered.
Align your body, assist the inner power,
Then it will gradually come on its own.

Though, by still needing to make a cognitive effort, perhaps not resolving the paradox of not doing, the concentration on accomplishing wu wei through the physiological would influence later thinkers. The Daodejing became influential in intellectual circles around 250 BCE. Included in the 2nd century Guanzi, the likely older Neiye (or Inward Training) may be the oldest recovered Chinese text, describing what would become Daoist breath meditation techniques and qi circulation, with Harold D. Roth considering it to be a genuine 4th-century BCE text.

When you enlarge your mind and let go of it,
When you relax your qi; vital breath and expand it,
When your body is calm and unmoving:
And you can maintain the One and discard the myriad disturbances.
You will see profit and not be enticed by it,
You will see harm and not be frightened by it.
Relaxed and unwound, yet acutely sensitive,
In solitude you delight in your own person.
This is called "revolving the vital breath":
Your thoughts and deeds seem heavenly.

Verse 13 describes the aspects of shén; 'numen'', ''numinous', attained through relaxed efforts.

There is a numen [shén]; naturally residing within;
One moment it goes, the next it comes,
And no one is able to conceive of it.
If you lose it you are inevitably disordered;
If you attain it you are inevitably well ordered.
Diligently clean out its lodging place;
And its vital essence will naturally arrive.
Still your attempts to imagine and conceive of it.
Relax your efforts to reflect on and control it.
Be reverent and diligent
And its vital essence will naturally stabilize.
Grasp it and don't let go
Then the eyes and ears won't overflow
And the mind will have nothing else to seek.
When a properly aligned mind resides within you,
The myriad things will be seen in their proper perspective.

=== Yin (passive mindfulness) ===
Adherence to the use of technique in governing requires the ruler not engage in any interference or subjective consideration. Sinologist John Makeham explains: "assessing words and deeds requires the ruler's dispassionate attention; (yin is) the skill or technique of making one's mind a tabula rasa, non-committaly taking note of all the details of a man's claims and then objectively comparing his achievements of the original claims."

A commentary to the Shiji cites a now-lost book as quoting Shen Buhai saying: "By employing (yin), 'passive mindfulness', in overseeing and keeping account of his vassals, accountability is deeply engraved." The Guanzi similarly says: "Yin is the way of non-action. Yin is neither to add to nor to detract from anything. To give something a name strictly on the basis of its form – this is the Method of yin." Yin also aimed at concealing the ruler's intentions, likes and opinions.

== Wuwei in Chan Buddhism ==
In early Chinese Buddhism, wuwei was used as a translation of nirvāṇa, which was understood to be unproduced and inactive. Although this translation was eventually abandoned in favor of niepan, a phonetic transliteration of nirvāṇa, wuwei continued to be used in Chinese Buddhist scholastic contexts as a translation of the Sanskrit term asaṃskṛta, or "unconditioned". Wuwei appears in the writings of Sengzhao (374–414), an early Chinese Buddhist who was an influence on the later Chan movement. Sengzhao argued that action (wei) and non-action (wu-wei) are identical for the sage. For Sengzhao, the sagely mind is neither existent nor nonexistent in that it is neither a deliberate mind of thought nor a lack of mind resembling a hollow space. Accordingly, Sengzhao writes that "the sage's 'action' cannot be taken to mean that he engages in deliberate activity, nor can speaking of his 'non-action' be taken to mean that he simply does not act."

In Chan sources, wuwei retains its native Chinese sense of "nonaction" and "without intent", although the term can also have multiple senses in one and the same source. Perhaps the earliest occurrence of the term in Chan can be found in the Two Entrances and Four Practices of Bodhidharma, located in the Long Scroll (dubbed the "Bodhidharma Anthology" by Jeffrey Broughton), which contains the earliest known records of Chan. There Bodhidharma says, "Principle is the obverse of the conventional; quiet mind and practice no-action; forms follow the turnings of fate; the ten thousand existences are thus void; wish for nothing."

Wuwei also appears in teachings of the East Mountain school. For example, in the Xiuxin yao lun, Hongren explains that the ignorant mind's learning is useless compared to the learning of the mind which is inactive or unconditioned (wuwei). This is called "true learning" in which there is ultimately nothing that is learned. Henrik Sorensen also observes that wuwei and other concepts commonly associated with Daoism appear in the two Oxhead School texts, the Jueguan lun (Treatise on Cutting Off Contemplation) and the Xin Ming (Mind Inscription). For example, the Xin Ming says:

Enjoying the Dao is calming
Wandering at ease in the truly real
Nothing to do [無為, wuwei], nothing to attain
Relying on nothing, appearing naturally

According to Robert Sharf, the Jueguan lun and the Xin Ming can be grouped together with a number of other early Chan texts probably composed sometime during the eighth or ninth century which exhibit a similarity of lexical terms and doctrinal content. This group of texts includes such works as the Xinwang Ming (Mind King Inscription) and the well known Xinxin Ming (Faith-Mind Inscription), as well as the Dunhuang manuscript, the Wuxin lun (Treatise on No-Mind). Wuwei occurs in these texts as well, as the Xinwang Ming says, "The Dharma-jewel of unbiased activity [無為, wuwei] / Is neither shallow nor profound," and in the Xinxin Ming one finds: "The wise are without interfering activity [無為, wuwei] / Foolish men entangle themselves." The Wuxin lun says, "Engaged in actions day in and day out, [I] do without doing—which is nothing other than no-mind," and "No perception, no activity: that’s wuwei." According to Urs App, the use of wuwei here resembles that of chapter 3 of the Daodejing, which says, "[The perfect man] acts without acting; thus everything is taken care of."

Wuwei also occurs several times in another text associated with the Oxhead School known as the Baozang lun (Treasure Store Treatise), where it appears alongside the East Asian philosophical concept of ganying, or "sympathetic resonance". In a Buddhist context, this relates to the idea of ying-shen, the resonant or response body of a Buddha. It is that by which the Buddhist sage is able to respond to external stimuli and the needs of suffering beings spontaneously and "without any premeditation or will of his own." According to Sharf, this combines the early Chinese ideal of the sage-king with Indian Buddhist notions of Bodhi as free of karmic activity. The Baozang lun says: "Some call it holy, some call it brilliant; there are many ways to refer to it, as each employs its own name. But in reality its essential principle is nonaction, and its appearance is the absence of attributes." (Note: Also from the Baozang lun: "Its greatness is vast and boundless; it is the single substance of all sentient life, equally embracing the myriad things. It responds, giving rise to a thousand transformations; it changes, producing a multitude of manifestations. It neither comes forth nor passes away, yet it functions without pause. There is mind but no form, functioning but no human agency. It manifests as birth, yet there is no birth; it manifests as a body, yet there is no body. Always reckoning but never reckoned, always perceiving but never perceived, there is action without intention, and attainment without anything attained.") Sharf observes that the Baozang lun contains influences from Twofold Mystery Daoism (ch’ung-hsüan).

Wuwei appears in verses attributed to the Liang dynasty figure Baozhi. For example: "The uncontrived [無為, wuwei] Great Way is natural and spontaneous; you don't need to use your mind to figure it out." (Note: Alternative translation by Randolph Whitfield: "Wuwei, the great Dao, self-existent No use to weigh it with the heart") It also appears in the famous Zhengdao ge (Song of Attaining the Way), attributed to Huineng's disciple Yongjia Xuanjue: "The leisurely person of the Way who has ceased all learning and has nothing more to do (wuwei/muwi 無為), / neither removes deluded thoughts nor seeks truth." According to Jinhua Jia, although the above have been attributed to Baozhi of the Liang and Yongjia Xuanjue respectively, these are likely products of the Hongzhou school of Chan, which flourished during the Tang dynasty.

Hongzhou sources also caution against grasping onto non-doing itself as some object of attachment. For example, as Baizhang Huaihai points out: "The principle is the principle of nonseeking; seek it and you lose it. If you cling to nonseeking, this is still the same as seeking; if you cling to nondoing, this is the same again as doing." In a similar vein, the Hongzhou master Dazhu Huihai explains that a prediction of Buddhahood will be obtained neither by relying on deeds nor even by refraining from methods. Instead, he says, "You must just avoid letting your minds dwell upon anything whatsoever, which implies (being unconcerned about) either deeds or no deeds—that is what we call 'receiving a prediction of Buddhahood'." (Note: See also the following, attributed to Baozhi: "Action and inaction—abolishing both is peace forever")

One can also find in Chan sources the similar term, wú shì (無事), often translated as "nothing-to-do", but which also has the meaning of no affairs, no concerns, no matters, and no business. For instance, Huangbo Xiyun states, "the person of the Way is the one who has nothing to do [wú shì], who has no mind at all and no doctrine to preach. Having nothing to do, such a person lives at ease." Likewise, Huangbo's student Linji Yixuan says, "Followers of the Way, as to buddhadharma, no effort is necessary. You have only to be ordinary, with nothing to do—defecating, urinating, wearing clothes, eating food, and lying down when tired." Linji also connects non-doing with "turning one's light around" (返照; fǎn zhào). That is, according to Linji, when one stops seeking externally and turns one's own light in upon oneself, one will on that very instant have nothing to do. (Note: Compare with the Xinxin Ming: "In self-illumination, vast and clear, The mind’s power exerts itself no more.")

During the Tokugawa period in Japan, Hakuin Ekaku criticized the Zen style of the unconventional master Bankei Yōtaku as "Do-nothing Unborn Zen". According to Bankei's teaching, as one's unborn Buddha Mind is marvelously illuminating (reimei 霊明) and "smoothly manages each and every thing," there is no need to rely on one's own cleverness or shrewdness. According to Bankei, because one's Buddha Mind is unborn and marvelously illuminating, it recognizes and distinguishes all phenomena naturally and without any forethought. He likens this function to that of a bright mirror, which reflects without conscious intention. As Bankei explains, "With the dynamic function of the marvelously illuminating Buddha Mind, every object that comes before your eyes is individually recognized and distinguished without your doing a thing. So, even though you're not trying to do so, you recognize thousands of different impressions by sight or by sound." As it is sufficient to simply realize this clearly, Bankei held that it was unnecessary to engage in practices such as sitting in zazen or investigating koans. For Bankei, one has only to leave everything to the unborn Buddha Mind and function with it in all one's affairs. Bankei also wrote:

Chasing after words, pursuing phrases, when will you ever be done?
You run yourself ragged amassing knowledge, becoming widely informed
Self-nature is empty and illuminating, so let things take care of themselves
There's nothing else I have to pass on

In recent times, the Korean Sŏn master Daehaeng (1927–2012) taught "doing without doing" (ham i ŏpsi handa). According to her view, the fundamental reality, or natural state, is a nondual whole in which everything functions together as one. As such, no separate doer exists, since everything is "happening naturally, without a conscious effort on the part of the individual." In terms of a method of spiritual cultivation, "doing without doing" entails letting go of the thought of the individual as a separate doer. For Daehaeng, this requires faith in one's foundation, or fundamental mind, which is connected to all phenomena and functions together with them in a nondual way. As one knows that this foundation is doing all things, one entrusts everything to it with the faith that it is taking care of whatever arises in one's life. Thus, one is able to let go naturally and automatically. Daehaeng said:

When you let go unconditionally and go forward, the front thought disappears and the thought after that also disappears. Thus you can let go with mindless mind, without the thought of letting go. Only when you are able to do this, will you understand the principle that there is no hindrance anywhere, that you do not block coming things and do not hold leaving things, and the principle of doing without doing.

== Wuwei in Legalism ==
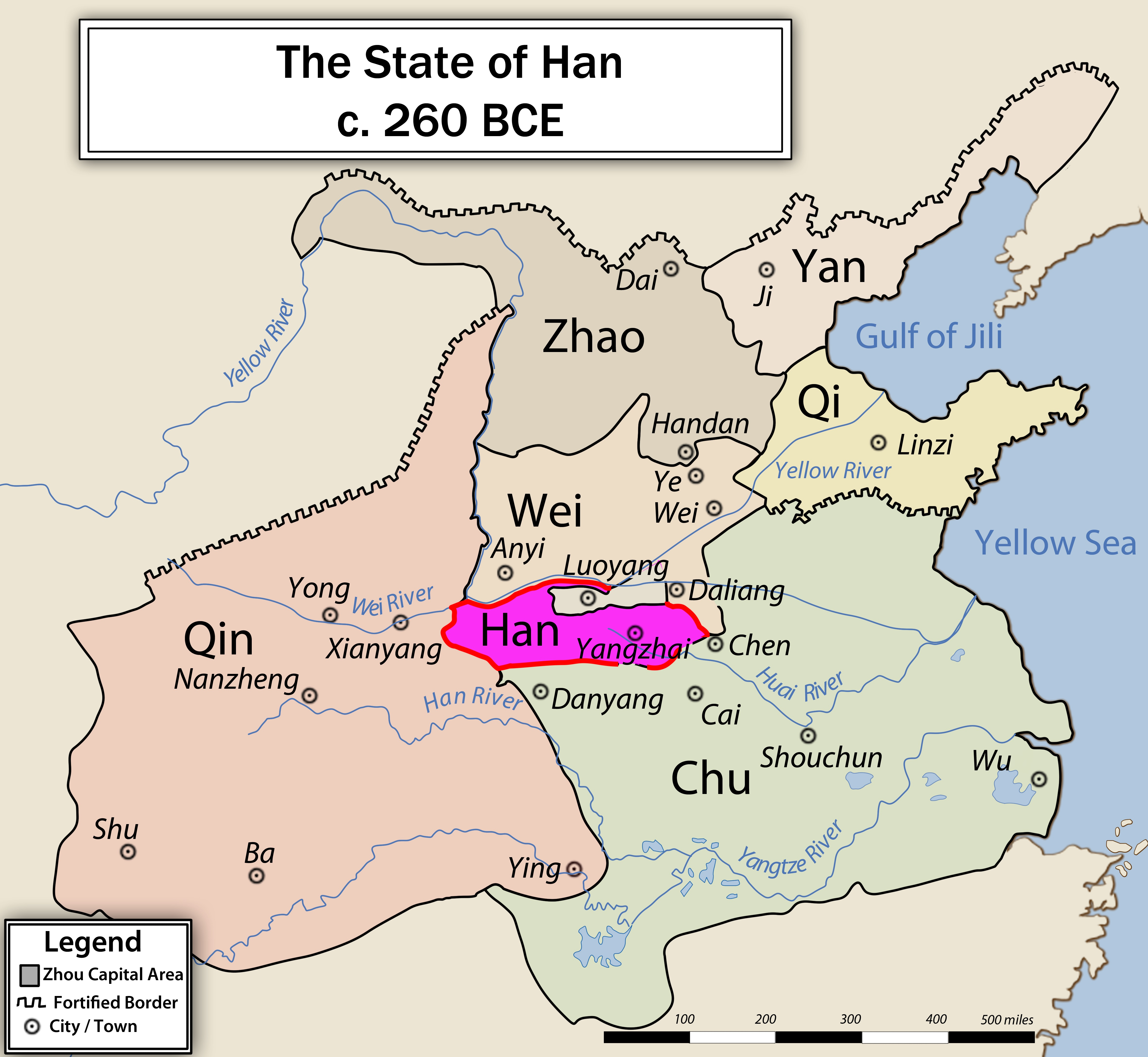

Important information lay in the recovery of the fragments of administrator Shen Buhai. Shen portrays Yao as using Fa (administrative method) in the selection and evaluation of men. Though not a conclusive argument against proto-Daoist influence, Shen's Daoist terms do not show evidence of Daoist usage (Confucianism also uses terms like 'Dao', meaning the 'Way' of government), lacking any metaphysical connotation. The later Legalist book, the Han Feizi has a commentary on the Daodejing, but references Shen Buhai rather than Laozi for this usage.

Shen is credited with the dictum "The Sage ruler relies on method and does not rely on wisdom; he relies on technique, not on persuasions", and used the term wu wei to mean that the ruler, though vigilant, should not interfere with the duties of his ministers, saying "One who has the right way of government does not perform the functions of the five (aka various) officials, and yet is the master of the government".

Since the bulk of both the Daodejing and Zhuangzi appear to have been composed at a later point, Creel argued that it may therefore be assumed that Shen influenced them, much of both appearing to be counter-arguments against Legalist controls. The "Way of Heaven" chapter of the Zhuangzi seems to follow Shen Buhai down to the detail, saying "Superiors must be without action in-order to control the world; inferiors must be active in-order to be employed in the world's business..." and to paraphrase, that foundation and principle are the responsibility of the superior, superstructure and details that of the minister, but then goes on to attack Shen's administrative details as non-essential.

Elsewhere, the Zhuangzi references another Legalist, Shen Dao, as impartial and lacking selfishness, his "great way embracing all things".

=== Non-action by the ruler ===
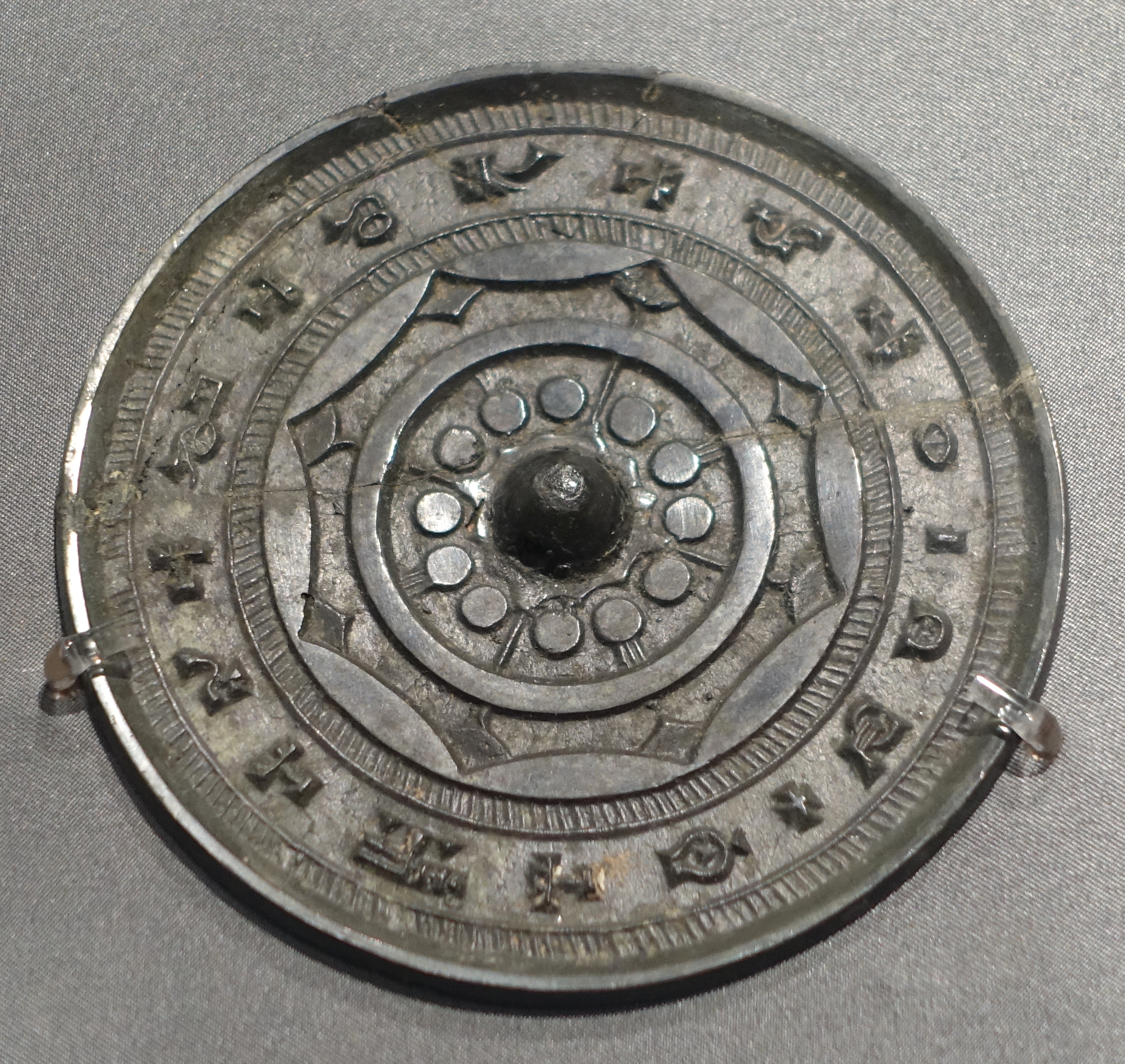
Zhaoming Mirror frame, Western Han dynasty

Shen Buhai argued that if the government were organized and supervised relying on proper method (Fa), the ruler needs to do little – and must do little. Apparently paraphrasing the Analects, Shen did not consider the relationship between ruler and minister antagonistic necessarily, but still believed that the ruler's most able ministers were his greatest danger, and was convinced that it was impossible to make them loyal without techniques. Sinologist Herrlee G. Creel explains: "The ruler's subjects are so numerous, and so on alert to discover his weaknesses and get the better of him, that it is hopeless for him alone as one man to try to learn their characteristics and control them by his knowledge... the ruler must refrain from taking the initiative, and from making himself conspicuous – and therefore vulnerable – by taking any overt action."

Emphasizing the use of administrative methods (Fa) in secrecy, Shen Buhai portrays the ruler as putting up a front to hide his weaknesses and dependence on his advisers. Shen therefore advises the ruler to keep his own counsel, hide his motivations, and conceal his tracks in inaction, availing himself of an appearance of stupidity and insufficiency. Shen says:

If the ruler's intelligence is displayed, men will prepare against it; if his lack of intelligence is displayed, they will delude him. If his wisdom is displayed, men will gloss over (their faults); if his lack of wisdom is displayed, they will hide from him. If his lack of desires is displayed, men will spy out his true desires; if his desires are displayed, they will tempt him. Therefore (the intelligent ruler) says 'I cannot know them; it is only by means of non-action that I control them.'

Acting through Fa, the ruler conceals his intentions, likes and dislikes, skills and opinions. Not acting himself, he can avoid being manipulated. The ruler plays no active role in governmental functions. He should not use his talent even if he has it. Not using his own skills, he is better able to secure the services of capable functionaries. Creel argues that not getting involved in details allowed Shen's ruler to "truly rule", because it leaves him free to supervise the government without interfering, maintaining his perspective. Seeing and hearing independently, the ruler is able to make decisions independently, and is, Shen says, able to rule the world thereby.

The ruler is like a mirror, reflecting light, doing nothing, and yet, beauty and ugliness present themselves; (or like) a scale establishing equilibrium, doing nothing, and yet causing lightness and heaviness to discover themselves. (Administrative) method (Fa) is complete acquiescence. (Merging his) personal (concerns) with the public (weal), he does not act. He does not act, and yet the world itself is complete.

— Shen Buhai

This wu wei might be said to end up the political theory of the "Legalists", if not becoming their general term for political strategy, playing a "crucial role in the promotion of the autocratic tradition of the Chinese polity". The (qualified) non-action of the ruler ensures his power and the stability of the polity.

=== Non-action in statecraft ===
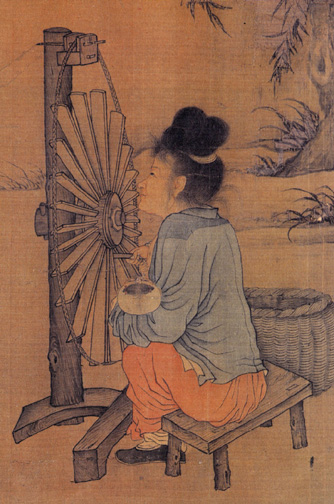
"The Way of Listening is to be giddy as though soused. Be dumber and dumber. Let others deploy themselves, and accordingly I shall know them." Right and wrong whirl around him like spokes on a wheel, but the sovereign does not complot. Emptiness, stillness, non-action—these are the characteristics of the Way. By checking and comparing how it accords with reality, [one ascertains] the "performance" of an enterprise. Han Fei Detail of The Spinning Wheel, by Chinese artist Wang Juzheng, Northern Song dynasty (960–1279)

Shen Buhai insisted that the ruler must be fully informed of the state of his realm, but couldn't afford to get caught up in details and in an ideal situation need listen to no one. Listening to his courtiers might interfere with promotions, and he does not, as Sinologist Herrlee G. Creel says, have the time to do so. The way to see and hear independently is the grouping together of particulars into categories using mechanical or operational method (Fa). On the contrary the ruler's eyes and ears will make him "deaf and blind" (unable to obtain accurate information). Seeing and hearing independently, the ruler is able to make decisions independently, and is, Shen says, able to rule the world thereby.

Despite this, Shen's method of appointment, Ming-shih, advises a particular method for listening to petitioners in the final analyses, which would be articulated as Xing-Ming by Han Fei. In the Han dynasty secretaries of government who had charge of the records of decisions in criminal matters were called Xing-Ming, which Sima Qian (145 or 135 – 86 BC) and Liu Xiang (77–6 BC) attributed to the doctrine of Shen Buhai (400 – c. 337 BC). Liu Xiang goes as far as to define Shen Buhai's doctrine as Xing-Ming. Rather than having to look for "good" men, ming-shih or xing-ming can seek the right man for a particular post by comparing his reputation with real conduct (xing "form" or shih "reality"), though doing so implies a total organizational knowledge of the regime.

More simply though, one can allow ministers to "name" themselves through accounts of specific cost and time frame, leaving their definition to competing ministers. Claims or utterances "bind the speaker to the realization a job" (Makeham). This was the doctrine, with subtle differences, favoured by Han Fei. Favoring exactness, it combats the tendency to promise too much. The correct articulation of 名; míng; 'name'', ''speech'', ''title' is considered crucial to the realization of projects.

Shen resolved hair-splitting litigation through wu wei, or not getting involved, making an official's words his own responsibility. Shen Buhai says, "The ruler controls the policy, the ministers manage affairs. To speak ten times and ten times be right, to act a hundred times and a hundred times succeed – this is the business of one who serves another as minister; it is not the way to rule." The correlation between wu wei and ming-shih likely informed the Taoist conception of the formless Tao that "gives rise to the ten thousand things."

=== Han Fei ===
Devoting the entirety of Chapter 14, "How to Love the Ministers", to "persuading the ruler to be ruthless to his ministers", Han Fei's enlightened ruler strikes terror into his ministers by doing nothing (wu wei). The qualities of a ruler, his "mental power, moral excellence and physical prowess" are irrelevant. He discards his private reason and morality, and shows no personal feelings. What is important is his method of government. Fa (administrative standards) require no perfection on the part of the ruler.

If the Han Fei's use of wu wei was derivative of proto-Daoist folk religion, its Dao nonetheless emphasizes autocracy ("Tao does not identify with anything but it non-self, the ruler does not identify with the ministers"). Accepting that Han Fei applies wu wei specifically to statecraft, professors Xing Lu argues that Han Fei still considered wu wei is still a virtue. As Han Fei says, "by virtue (De) of resting empty and reposed, he waits for the course of nature to force or unfold itself."

Dao is the beginning of the myriad things, the standard of right and wrong. That being so, the intelligent ruler, by holding to the beginning, knows the source of everything, and, by keeping to the standard, knows the origin of good and evil. Therefore, by virtue of resting empty and reposed, he waits for the course of nature to enforce itself so that all names will be defined of themselves and all affairs will be settled of themselves. Empty, he knows the essence of fullness: reposed, he becomes the corrector of motion. Who utters a word creates himself a name; who has an affair creates himself a form. Compare forms and names and see if they are identical. Then the ruler will find nothing to worry about as everything is reduced to its reality...

Dao exists in invisibility; its function, in unintelligibility. Be empty and reposed and have nothing to do-Then from the dark see defects in the light. See but never be seen. Hear but never be heard. Know but never be known. If you hear any word uttered, do not change it nor move it but compare it with the deed and see if word and deed coincide with each other. Place every official with a censor. Do not let them speak to each other. Then everything will be exerted to the utmost. Cover tracks and conceal sources. Then the ministers cannot trace origins. Leave your wisdom and cease your ability. Then your subordinates cannot guess at your limitations.

The Han Feizi's commentary on the Daodejing asserts that perspectiveless knowledge – an absolute point of view – is possible.

=== Shen Dao ===
Shen Dao espouses an impersonal administration in much the same sense as Shen Buhai, and argued for wu wei, or the non action of the ruler, along the same lines, saying

The Dao of ruler and ministers is that the ministers labour themselves with tasks while the prince has no task; the prince is relaxed and happy while the ministers bear responsibility for tasks. The ministers use all their intelligence and strength to perform his job satisfactorily, in which the ruler takes no part, but merely waits for the job to be finished. As a result, every task is taken care of. The correct way of government is thus.

Shen Dao eschews appointment by interview in favour of a mechanical distribution apportioning every person according to their achievement. Linking administrative methods or standards to the notion of impartial objectivity associated with universal interest, and reframing the language of the old ritual order to fit a universal, imperial and highly bureaucratized state, Shen cautions the ruler against relying on his own personal judgment, contrasting personal opinions with the merit of the objective standard as preventing personal judgements or opinions from being exercised. Personal opinions destroy standards, and Shen Dao's ruler therefore "does not show favoritism toward a single person".

When an enlightened ruler establishes [gong] ("duke" or "public interest"), [private] desires do not oppose the correct timing [of things], favoritism does not violate the law, nobility does not trump the rules, salary does not exceed [that which is due] one's position, a [single] officer does not occupy multiple offices, and a [single] craftsman does not take up multiple lines of work... [Such a ruler] neither overworked his heart-mind with knowledge nor exhausted himself with self-interest (si), but, rather, depended on laws and methods for settling matters of order and disorder, rewards and punishments for deciding on matters of right and wrong, and weights and balances for resolving issues of heavy or light...

The reason why those who apportion horses use ce-lots, and those who apportion fields use gou-lots, is not that they take ce and gou-lots to be superior to human wisdom, but that one may eliminate private interest and stop resentment by these means. Thus it is said: 'When the great lord relies on fa and does not act personally, affairs are judged in accordance with (objective) method (fa).' The benefit of fa is that each person meets his reward or punishment according to his due, and there are no further expectations of the lord. Thus resentment does not arise and superiors and inferiors are in harmony.

If the lord of men abandons method (Fa) and governs with his own person, then penalties and rewards, seizures and grants, will all emerge from the lord's mind. If this is the case, then those who receive rewards, even if these are commensurate, will ceaselessly expect more; those who receive punishment, even if these are commensurate, will endlessly expect more lenient treatment... people will be rewarded differently for the same merit and punished differently for the same fault. Resentment arises from this."

== Han dynasty ==
Legalism dominated the intellectual life of the Qin and early Han together with Daoism. Early Han dynasty Emperors like Emperor Jing (r. 157–141 BCE) would be steeped in a Daoistic laissez-faire. But Shen Buhai's book would be widely studied even from the beginning of the Han era. Jia Yi's (200–168 AD) Hsin-shu, undoubtedly influenced by the "Legalists", describes Shen Buhai's techniques as methods of applying the Dao, or virtue, bringing together Confucian and Daoist discourses under the imagery of the Zhuangzi. Many later texts, for instance in Huang-Lao, use similar images to describe the quiescent attitude of the ruler. The Huang-Lao text Huainanzi (Western Han dynasty 206 B.C. – 9 AD), although oriented toward state interest, would go on to include naturalist arguments in favour of rule by worthies on the basis that one needs their competence for such things as diplomacy, and defines wu wei as follows:

"What is meant ... by wu-wei is that no personal prejudice [private or public will,] interferes with the universal Tao [the laws of things], and that no desires and obsessions lead the true course ... astray. Reason must guide action in order that power may be exercised according to the intrinsic properties and natural trends of things."

The Huang–Lao text Jing fa says:

The right way to understand all these (things) is to remain in a state of [vacuity,] formlessness and non-being. Only if one remains in such a state, may he thereby know that (all things) necessarily possess their forms and names as soon as they come into existence, even though they are as small as autumn down. As soon as forms and names are established, the distinction between black and white becomes manifest... there will be no way to escape from them without a trace or to hide them from regulation... [all things] will correct themselves.

== Modern ==
Philosopher Alan Watts believed that wu wei can be described as "not-forcing". Watts also understood wu wei as "the art of getting out of one’s own way" and offered the following illustration: "The river is not pushed from behind, nor is it pulled from ahead. It falls with gravity."

Leo Tolstoy was deeply influenced by Daoist philosophy, and wrote his own interpretation of wu wei in his piece Non-Activity.

Psychoanalyst Robin S. Brown has examined wu wei in the context of Western psychotherapy. Brown links wu wei with the psychoanalytic notion of enactment.

In her translation of the Tao Te Ching, Ursula K. Le Guin defined wu wei as "'doing without doing': uncompetitive, unworried, trustful accomplishment, power that is not force. An example or analogy might be a very good teacher, or the truest voice in a group of singers."

== See also ==
- Tao
- No-mind
- Flow (psychology)
- Willpower paradox
- Sprezzatura
- Sahaja
- Samyama
- Tang ping (lying flat)
- Zuhd
