= Lie Yukou =

4th-century BCE Chinese philosopher and author

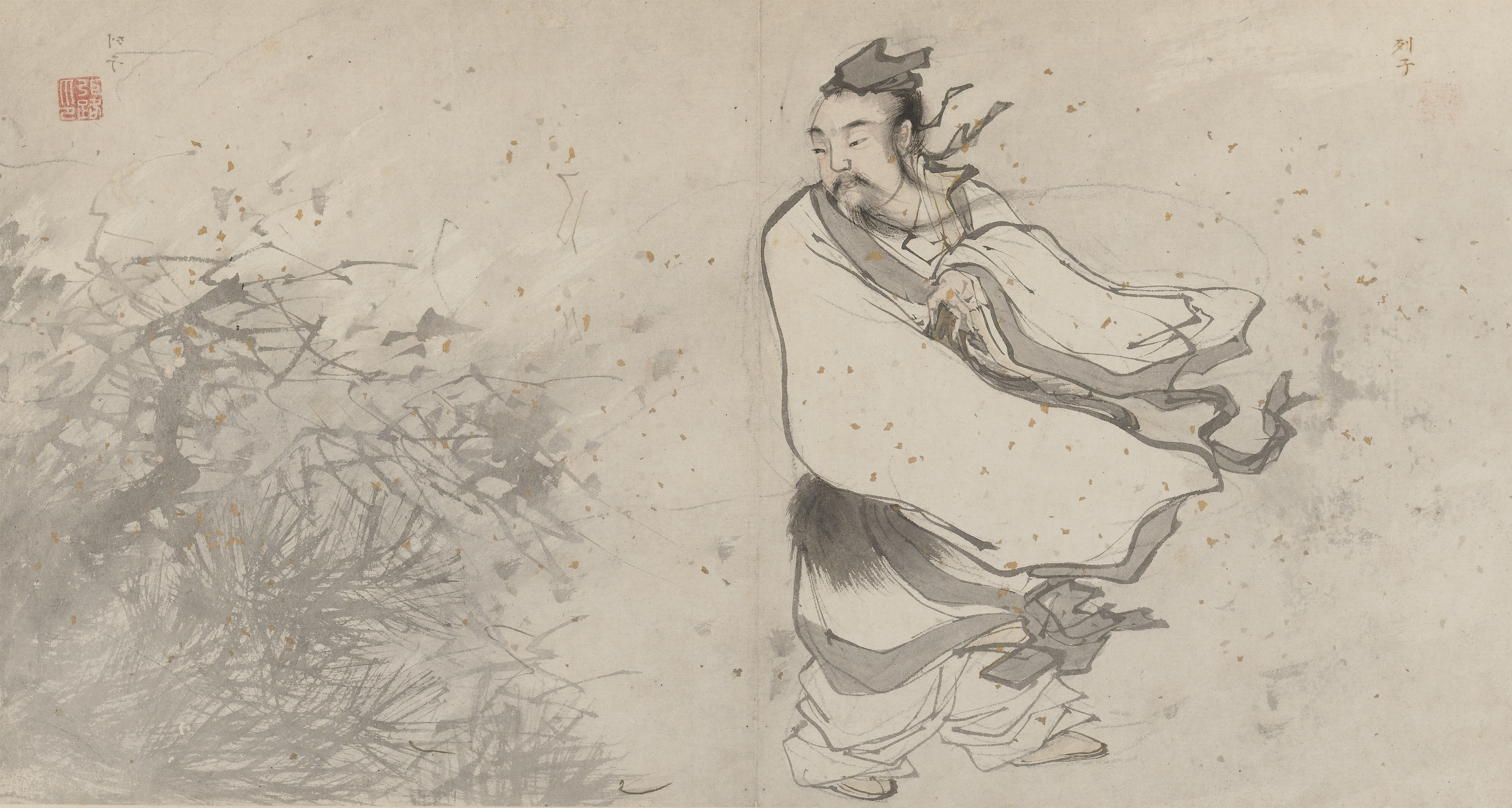
Zhang Lu's painting of Liezi, early 16th century

Lie Yukou (Chinese: 列禦寇/列圄寇; pinyin: Liè Yùkòu/Liè Yǔkòu; Wade–Giles: Lieh^{4} Yü^{4}-k‘ou^{4}/Lieh^{4} Yü^{3}-k‘ou^{4}; Jyutping: Lit6 Jyu6kau3/Lit6 Jyu5kau3; fl. c. 400 BCE) was a Chinese philosopher who is considered the author of the Daoist book Liezi, which uses his honorific name Liezi (Chinese: 列子; pinyin: Lièzǐ; Wade–Giles: Lieh^{4} Tzŭ^{3}; lit. 'Master Lie').

== Early life ==
Lie Yukou was born in the State of Zheng, near today's Zhengzhou, Henan Province.

== History ==
There is little historical evidence of Lie Yukou as a Hundred Schools of Thought philosopher during the Warring States period. This could be due to the burning of books and burying of scholars which occurred during the reign of Qin Shi Huang. However, some scholars believe that the Zhuangzi invented him as a Daoist exemplar. Frederic H. Balfour, who translated several Taoist texts, called Liezi "a philosopher who never lived" (1887:?) Lionel Giles expresses doubt in his Introduction:

Very little is known of our author beyond what he tells us himself. His full name was Lieh Yü-k'ou, and it appears that he was living in the Chêng State not long before the year 398 BC, when the Prime Minister Tzu Yang was killed in a revolution. He figures prominently in the pages of Chuang Tzu, from whom we learn that he could 'ride upon the wind'. On the insufficient ground that he is not mentioned by the historian Ssu-ma Ch'ien, a certain critic of the Sung dynasty was led to declare that Lieh Tzu was only a fictitious personage invented by Chuang Tzu, and that the treatise which passes under his name was a forgery of later times. This theory is rejected by the compilers of the great Catalogue of Ch‘ien Lung's Library, who represent the cream of Chinese scholarship in the eighteenth century.

In the above quote Mr. Lionel Giles may have been refuting his father Herbert Allen Giles, who wrote of Lie Yukou or Lieh-Tzu in his translation of Chuang Tzu. Here is his quote which runs as follows:

The extent of the actual mischief done by this " Burning of the Books " has been greatly exaggerated. Still, the mere attempt at such a holocaust gave a fine chance to the scholars of the later Han dynasty (A.D. 25-221), who seem to have enjoyed nothing so much as forging, if not the whole, at any rate portions, of the works of ancient authors. Some one even produced a treatise under the name of Lieh Tzu, a philosopher mentioned by Chuang Tzu, not seeing that the individual in question was a creation of Chuang Tzu's brain!
