= D. C. Lau =

Chinese sinologist and author (1921–2010)

- Lau Din-cheuk (劉殿爵)
- Born: March 8, 1921; Hong Kong, British Empire
- Died: April 26, 2010 (aged 89); Hong Kong, China

Academic background
- Education: King's College; University of Hong Kong; Glasgow University

Academic work
- Discipline: Sinology
- Institutions: S Oriental & African Studies; London University; Chinese U of Hong Kong; TT Ng Chinese Language Research Centre

D. C. Lau
- Traditional Chinese: 劉殿爵
- Simplified Chinese: 刘殿爵
Transcriptions
Standard Mandarin
- Hanyu Pinyin: Liú Diànjué
Yue: Cantonese
- Yale Romanization: Làuh Din-cheuk

Din Cheuk Lau (Chinese: 劉殿爵; pinyin: Liú Diànjué; Cantonese Yale: Lau Din Cheuk; 8 March 1921 – 26 April 2010), commonly known by initials as D. C. Lau was a Hongkonger sinologist and author of the widely read translations of Tao Te Ching, Mencius and The Analects and contributed to the Proper Cantonese pronunciation movement.

D. C. Lau studied Chinese under Xu Dishan at the University of Hong Kong, but fled to Mainland China in 1941 just before the Japanese occupied Hong Kong. In 1946, he was offered one of the first scholarships for a British university and studied Western philosophy in Glasgow University (1946–49). In 1950, Lau would take up a post at London University's School of Oriental and African Studies, developing SOAS into a world-renowned centre for the study of Chinese philosophy.

He was appointed in 1965 to the newly created Readership in Chinese Philosophy and in 1970 became Professor of Chinese in the University of London. In 1978 he returned to Hong Kong to take up the Chair of Chinese Language and Literature at the Chinese University of Hong Kong. On his retirement in 1989, he began to computerise the entire body of extant ancient Chinese works, with a series of sixty concordances.

== Bibliography ==
- Lau, D. C. (1963). Tao Te Ching. London: Penguin Books. ISBN 978-0140441314.
- Lau, D. C. (1970). Mencius. London: Penguin Books. ISBN 978-0140449716.
- Lau, D. C. (1979). The Analects. London: Penguin Books. ISBN 978-0140443486.
- Lau, D. C. (2000). The Analects (New Bilingual ed.). Hong Kong: Chinese University Press. ISBN 978-9622019805.
- Lau, D. C. (2001). Tao Te Ching (New Bilingual ed.). Hong Kong: Chinese University Press. ISBN 978-9622019928.
- Lau, D. C. (2003). Mencius (New Bilingual ed.). Hong Kong: Chinese University Press. ISBN 978-9622018518.
