= Oxhead school =

Chan Buddhist tradition

The Oxhead school (牛頭宗 niútóu zōng) was an important tradition of Chan Buddhism in the Tang dynasty, which claimed to have been founded by Niutou Farong 牛頭法融 (594–657), regarded as a Dharma heir of the Fourth Patriarch Daoxin (580–651). However, the connection between the two monks is tenuous, and the actual formation of the Oxhead School as a lineage independent of both Northern and Southern Chan has been credited to the monk Zhiwei (646–722).

Their main temple was located at Oxhead Mountain (Niu-t'ou shan) in Chiang-su, near modern Nanjing, hence the name. The school throve throughout the Tang and into the early years of the Song dynasty (10th century). Sharf observes that the Oxhead School played a central role in the development of early Chan. According to John R. McRae, the original text of the Platform Sutra may have originated within the Oxhead school.

== Teachings ==
An important text associated with the Oxhead School is the Jueguan lun 絶觀論, the Treatise on the Transcendence of Cognition (alternatively, the Treatise on Cutting Off Contemplation). According to Robert Sharf, this work is "the single most extensive surviving document associated with Ox Head Ch’an." The text consists of a dialogue between two hypothetical characters, Professor Enlightenment and his student, Conditionality. The Jueguan lun opens the dialogue between Enlightenment and Conditionality with the following exchange:

"What is the mind? What is it to pacify the mind (an-hsin 安心)?" [The master] answered: "You should not posit a mind, nor should you attempt to pacify it—this may be called 'pacified.'"

According to Whalen Lai, this is to be taken as a jab at the East Mountain School, which was known to have taught a practice called "pacifying the mind" (anxin 安心). Sharf also observes that the Oxhead text known as the Wuxin lun (Treatise on No-Mind) seems to be "uninterested in techniques for quieting or discerning the mind; such energy is misplaced since there is no mind to discern." For Sharf, such Oxhead texts offer an alternative to "mindfulness," and critique the reification of mind on both philosophical and soteriological grounds. Delusions are not to be eradicated, as the Jueguan lun points out in the conclusion to its first section:

Emmon: “How can delusions of sentient beings be eradicated?”
Nyuri: “As long as one sees delusions and their eradication, one cannot shed them.”

Emmon: “Is it possible to be at one with the Way without having eradicated the delusions?”
Nyuri: “As long as one thinks of being at one with and not being at one with, one is not free of delusions.”

Emmon: “What should one do then?”
Nyuri: “Not doing anything—that’s it!”

According to Kuno, the Oxhead School was opposed to Northern School contemplative practices, such as "maintaining [awareness of] the mind" (shouxin 守心). Sorensen also notes the reference to, and rejection of, the Northern School practice of shouxin in the short Oxhead text, the Xin Ming (Mind Inscription). This work says, "By grasping the mind and maintaining stillness, one will still not be able to leave behind the sickness (of clinging)." (Note: Compare with Zhitong's words in the longer Platform Sutra: "All [deliberate] activation of cultivation is false activity. To guard one’s abiding is not true serenity." Much of the content of chapters seven, eight, and nine of the longer Platform Sutra, including the Zhitong material, was imported into the text from the Jingde Chuandeng lu.) Similarly, Faure observes that the Xinxin Ming (Faith-Mind Inscription), traditionally attributed to the third patriarch Sengcan though likely a product of the Oxhead School, exhibits criticism of the Northern School practice known as "maintaining the one" or "guarding the one" (shou yi 守一): "If there is even a trace of 'is' or 'is not,' the mind will be lost in confusion. Although the two comes from the One, do not guard even this One."

On the other hand, McRae's view is that the Oxhead School did not fundamentally disagree with the Northern School in terms of mental contemplation and the need for constant practice, but differed in its extensive use of negation. McRae also understands the Oxhead School as having had a transitional nature which sought to transcend the divide between Northern and Southern Chan. Yanagida saw the Oxhead School as a protest movement against the Northern School, but which lacked the factionalist spirit of the Southern School.

In his accounts and critiques of the various schools of Tang-era Chan, Zongmi describes the axiom of the Niutou (Oxhead) as "cutting off and not leaning on anything," and its practice as "forgetting feelings" (wangqing), which Zongmi associates with the Madhyamaka praxis of being unfixed and without support. Sharf also observes that Oxhead monks were influenced by the Sanlun School of Chinese Madhyamaka. Both Oxhead and Sanlun accepted the Buddha-nature of insentient things, such as grasses and tiles, as well.

== Writings ==
Important texts associated with the Oxhead School include:

- Jueguan lun 絶觀論 (Treatise on the Transcendence of Cognition), translated into English in The Ceasing of Notions, an Early Zen Text from the Dunhuang Caves with Selected Comments, Wisdom Publications, 2012; and A Dialogue on the Contemplation-Extinguished, translated by Gishin Tokiwa, Institute for Zen Studies, 1973.
- Wuxin lun 無心論 (Treatise on No-mind), translated into English by Urs App in the Eastern Buddhist, New Series, Volume 28, No. 1, Spring 1995 (see here).
- Xin Ming 心銘 (Mind Inscription), which has been translated into English by Henrik H. Sorensen in the Journal of Chinese Philosophy Vol.13, 1986, pp.101-120 (see here and here); and also by Chan Master Sheng Yen in Song of Mind: Wisdom from the Zen Classic Xin Ming, Shambhala Publications 2004; as well as in Sheng Yen, The Poetry of Enlightenment, Poems by Ancient Chan Masters, pages 31-43, Shambhala Publications, 2006. Most recently, the Xin Ming has been translated by Randolph S. Whitfield in Records of the Transmission of the Lamp, Volume 8, Chan Poetry and Inscriptions, pages 89-95, Books on Demand, 2020.
- Xinxin Ming 信心銘 (Inscription on the Faith-Mind), of which many English translations exist.
- Xuemai lun 血脈論 (Bloodstream Sermon), which has been translated into English by Red Pine in Zen Teachings of Bodhidharma, North Point Press 1987.
- Baozang lun 寶藏論 (Treasure Store Treatise), translated into English by Robert Sharf in Coming to Terms with Chinese Buddhism: A Reading of the Treasure Store Treatise, University of Hawai'i Press 2002.

== Posthumous influence ==
The Oxhead lineage was incorporated into the Japanese Tendai sect by Saichō, who had studied under Shunian, who resided at Chanlinsi Temple; however, the main Oxhead lineage died out after eight generations.

== See also ==
- Niaoke Daolin (741–824)

== Sources ==
- Koole, Boudewijn (1997), Dōgen Kigen: De Schatkamer van het Oog van de Ware Leer. Eerste selectie uit de Shōbōgenzō, met toelichtende informatie, Utrecht/Antwerpen: Kosmos-Z&K Uitgevers
