= Deng Yi (government official) =

Government official in Han dynasty China

- 鄧羲

Administrator (治中) (荊州牧)
- Monarch: Emperor Xian of Han

Personal details
- Born: unknown Zhangling (章陵)
- Occupation: Official

Deng Yi (birth and death year unknown) was a government official and administrator who lived in the late Eastern Han dynasty of China. Deng Yi served under the warlord Liu Biao in Jing Province (covering present-day Hubei and Hunan). After the death of Liu Biao and his son Liu Cong's surrender to Cao Cao, Deng served as an official (侍中) under Cao Cao.

== Life ==
The 漢晉春秋 records that in 196, Deng advised Liu Biao not to form an alliance with Yuan Shao. Liu did not heed this advice and dismissed Deng from office.

In 208, Liu Biao died and his son Liu Cong surrendered to the rival warlord Cao Cao. Cao Cao appointed Deng as an official.

== See also ==
- Lists of people of the Three Kingdoms
