= Heshang Gong =

Famous writer during the 1st century

Heshang Gong (also Ho-Shang Kung) is the reputed author of one of the earliest commentaries on the Tao Te Ching of Laozi to survive to modern times, which is dated to the latter part of the Han dynasty. While reputedly a reclusive Chinese hermit contemporary to Emperor Wen of Han (203/02 – 6 July 157 BCE), the commentaries attributed to Heshang Gong are in fact safely datable to around 130 CE.

Little is known about the life of Heshang Gong; however the impact of his writing is extensive in regards to the understanding and translation of the Dao De Jing, and is considered one of the earliest proponents of Taoist meditative practices which cultivate the “three treasures” of vitality, energy, and spirit, and the "dual cultivation" of spiritual nature (Chinese: 性; pinyin: xìng) and life-and-destiny (Chinese: 命; pinyin: mìng).

The Heshang Gong would become the dominant commentary on the Tao Te Ching from the early Tang dynasty onward, alongside Wang Bi. Though most known as a commentary as the Tao Te Ching, the scholarly State Council of the Tang dynasty considered it to have value as its own accessible, encompassing teaching, and not just a commentary. They did not consider his legendary status paramount, seeing his text as principally aiming to nurture the spirit, and in the grand scale, to bring peace to the state.

== Biography ==
Heshang Gong's name is only known as the epithet Riverside Elder (Chinese: 河上公; pinyin: héshàng gōng), being an early form of anshang 岸上, meaning on the bank or shore. What we know of Heshang Gong comes from the preface written by Ge Xuan 葛玄, a Taoist of the third century AD.

According to Ge Xuan, Emperor Wen of Han, a keen student of the Tao Te Ching, had heard that Heshang Gong was an expert on that text, and sent for him to come to the emperor to teach him. The hermit declined the invitation to teach the emperor, saying, "Tao is esteemed and Te honored, one cannot ask much about them." Annoyed, the emperor went to the hermit and sternly informed him that as he resided within the bounds of the Empire, and the emperor had the power to make him rich or poor. Heshang Gong immediately rose into the air and replied, "above: "Now above I have not reached heaven, in the middle I am not bound to men, below I am not staying on earth. How do I belong to the people? How could your Majesty want to make me rich and honored or poor and despised?"

The emperor realized that he was speaking to a divine emissary, repented of his brusque manner, and begged of the hermit to be instructed in the work. Thereupon Heshang Gong presented his commentary to the emperor.

== Commentary on the Tao Te Ching ==
Dan G. Reid says, "Heshang Gong’s insights into Taoist wisdom, history, cosmogony, and meditative practices, have been an essential aid to understanding the meaning, applicability, and cultural context of the Tao Te Ching throughout Chinese history. He was the first to explain, in written form, its many paradoxical idioms and place them in context of the time and culture in which they were written. Every subsequent commentary, re-editing, and translation of the Tao Te Ching has absorbed some degree of influence from his work."

Heshang Gong provides what Kohn calls the "first evidence for Taoist meditation" and "proposes a concentrative focus on the breath for harmonization with the Tao." Eduard Erkes says the purpose of the Heshang Gong commentary was not only to explicate the Tao Te Ching, but chiefly to enable "the reader to make practical use of the book and in teaching him to use it as a guide to meditation and to a life becoming a Taoist skilled in meditative training."

Most of the subtitles of each chapter of Yang Jwing Ming's English translation of the Tao Te Ching were borrowed from Heshang Gong's commentary. He states that this "was the earliest, most widespread, and most influential book in Chinese scholar society..."

Solala Towler's interpretation of the Tao Te Ching ("Practicing the Tao Te Ching: 81 Steps on the Way"), acknowledges a heavy dependence on Heshang Gong's commentary, and quotes from it frequently throughout.

== See also ==
- Tao Te Ching
- Taoist meditation
- Ge Xuan
- Wang Bi
- Xiang'er
- Mawangdui Silk Texts
- Guodian Chu Slips
- Yinqueshan Han Slips
