= Ancient philosophy =

Philosophy in the ancient world

This page lists some links to ancient philosophy, namely philosophical thought extending as far as early post-classical history (c. 600 CE).

== Overview ==
Genuine philosophical thought, depending upon original individual insights, arose in many cultures roughly contemporaneously. Karl Jaspers termed the intense period of philosophical development beginning around the 7th century BCE and concluding around the 3rd century BCE an Axial Age in human thought.

In Western philosophy, the spread of Christianity in the Roman Empire marked the ending of Hellenistic philosophy and ushered in the beginnings of medieval philosophy, whereas in the Middle East, the spread of Islam through the Arab Empire marked the end of Old Iranian philosophy and ushered in the beginnings of early Islamic philosophy.

== Ancient Greek and Roman philosophy ==
Graphical relationship among the various pre-Socratic philosophers and thinkers; red arrows indicate a relationship of opposition.

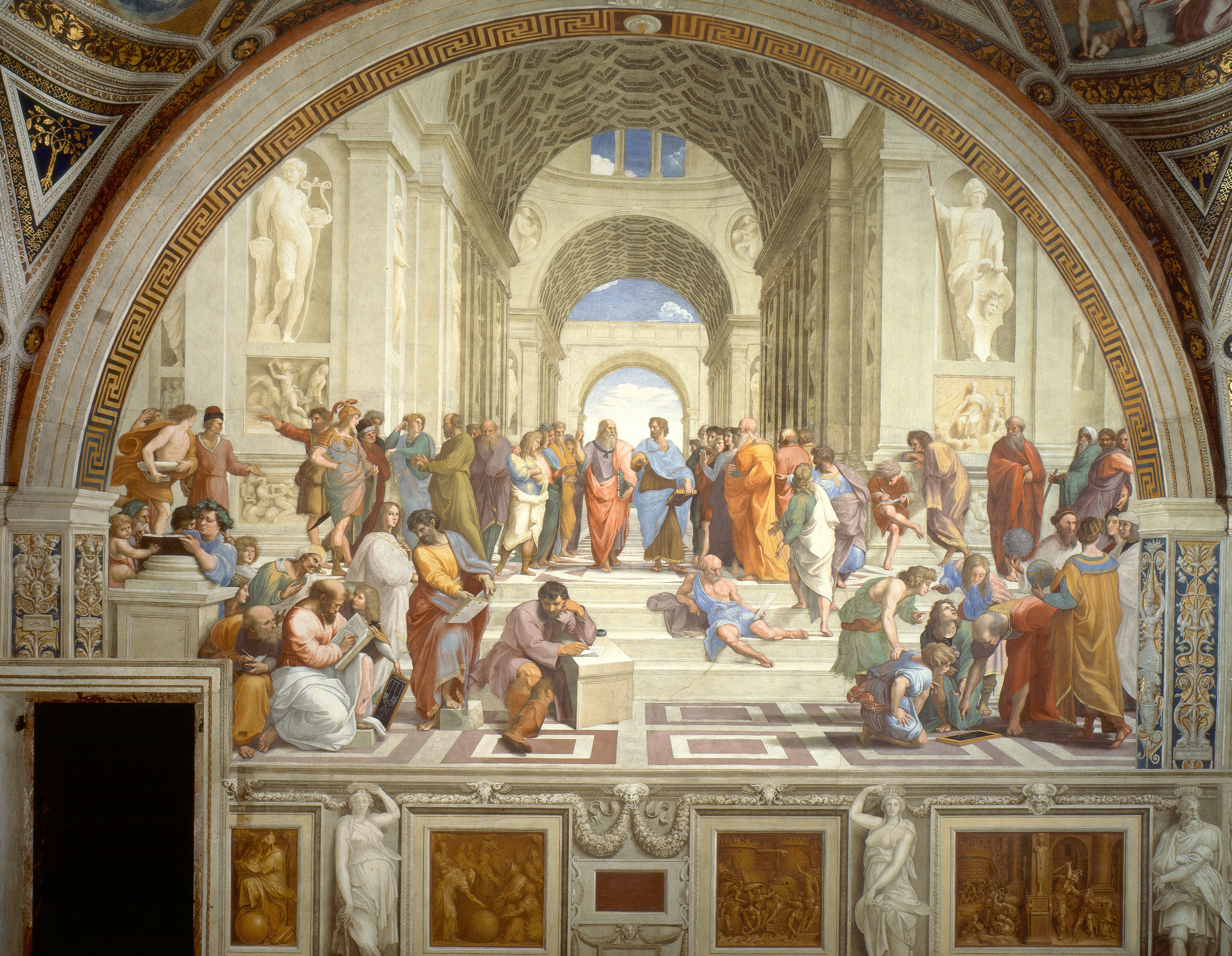
Raphael's School of Athens, depicting an array of ancient Greek philosophers engaged in discussion.

=== Philosophers ===
==== Pre-Socratic philosophers ====
- Milesian School

Thales (624 – c 546 BCE)
Anaximander (610 – 546 BCE)
Anaximenes of Miletus (c. 585 – c. 525 BCE)

- Pythagoreans

Pythagoras (582 – 496 BCE)
Philolaus (470 – 380 BCE)
Alcmaeon of Croton
Archytas (428 – 347 BCE)

- Heraclitus (535 – 475 BCE)
- Eleatic School

Xenophanes (570 – 470 BCE)
Parmenides (510 – 440 BCE)
Zeno of Elea (490 – 430 BCE)
Melissus of Samos (c. 470 BCE – ?)

- Pluralists

Empedocles (490 – 430 BCE)
Anaxagoras (500 – 428 BCE)

- Atomists

Leucippus (first half of 5th century BCE)
Democritus (460 – 370 BCE)
Metrodorus of Chios (4th century BCE)

- Pherecydes of Syros (6th century BCE)
- Sophists

Protagoras (490 – 420 BCE)
Gorgias (487 – 376 BCE)
Antiphon (480 – 411 BCE)
Prodicus (465/450 – after 399 BCE)
Hippias (middle of the 5th century BCE)
Thrasymachus (459 – 400 BCE)
Callicles
Critias
Lycophron

- Diogenes of Apollonia (c. 460 BCE – ?)

==== Classical Greek philosophers ====
- Socrates (469 – 399 BCE)
- Euclid of Megara (450 – 380 BCE)
- Antisthenes (445 – 360 BCE)
- Aristippus (435 – 356 BCE)
- Plato (428 – 347 BCE)
- Speusippus (407 – 339 BCE)
- Diogenes of Sinope (400 – 325 BCE)
- Xenocrates (396 – 314 BCE)
- Aristotle (384 – 322 BCE)
- Stilpo (380 – 300 BCE)
- Theophrastus (370 – 288 BCE)

==== Hellenistic philosophy ====
- Pyrrho (365 – 275 BCE)
- Epicurus (341 – 270 BCE)
- Metrodorus of Lampsacus (the younger) (331 – 278 BCE)
- Zeno of Citium (333 – 263 BCE)
- Cleanthes (c. 330 – c. 230 BCE)
- Timon (320 – 230 BCE)
- Arcesilaus (316 – 232 BCE)
- Menippus (3rd century BCE)
- Archimedes (c. 287 – 212 BCE)
- Chrysippus (280 – 207 BCE)
- Carneades (214 – 129 BCE)
- Clitomachus (187 – 109 BCE)
- Metrodorus of Stratonicea (late 2nd century BCE)
- Philo of Larissa (160 – 80 BCE)
- Posidonius (135 – 51 BCE)
- Antiochus of Ascalon (130 – 68 BCE)
- Aenesidemus (1st century BCE)
- Agrippa (1st century CE)

=== Hellenistic schools of thought ===
- Academic skepticism
- Cynicism
- Cyrenaicism
- Eclecticism
- Epicureanism
- Middle Platonism
- Neo-Platonism
- Neopythagoreanism
- Peripatetic School
- Pyrrhonism
- Stoicism
- Sophism

=== Early Roman and Christian philosophy ===
- Neoplatonism in Christianity
- School of the Sextii

=== Philosophers during Roman times ===
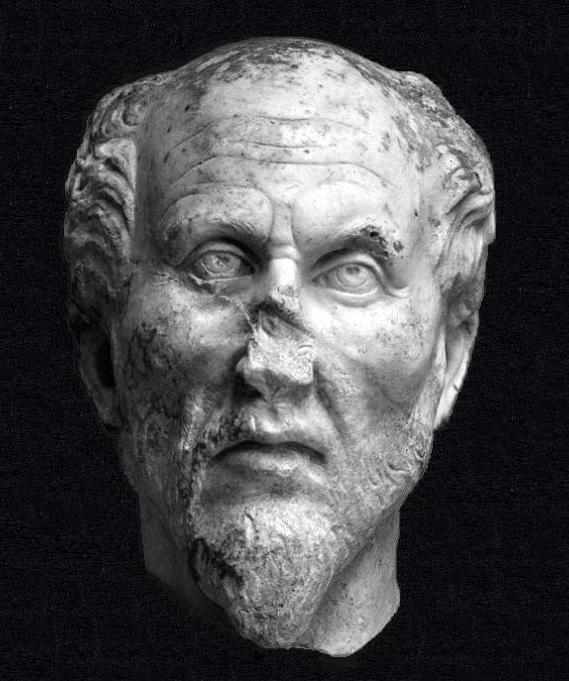
Plotinus

- Cicero (106 – 43 BCE)
- Lucretius (94 – 55 BCE)
- Seneca (4 BCE – 65 CE)
- Musonius Rufus (30 – 100 CE)
- Plutarch (45 – 120 CE)
- Epictetus (55 – 135 CE)
- Favorinus (c. 80 – c. 160 CE)
- Marcus Aurelius (121 – 180 CE)
- Clement of Alexandria (150 – 215 CE)
- Alcinous (philosopher) (2nd century CE)
- Sextus Empiricus (3rd century CE)
- Alexander of Aphrodisias (3rd century CE)
- Ammonius Saccas (3rd century CE)
- Plotinus (205 – 270 CE)
- Porphyry (232 – 304 CE)
- Iamblichus (242 – 327 CE)
- Themistius (317 – 388 CE)
- Ambrose (340 – 397 CE)
- Hypatia of Alexandria (350 – 415 CE)
- Augustine of Hippo (354 – 430 CE)
- Proclus (411 – 485 CE)
- Damascius (462 – 540 CE)
- Boethius (472 – 524 CE)
- Simplicius of Cilicia (490 – 560 CE)
- John Philoponus (490 – 570 CE)

== Ancient Iranian philosophy ==
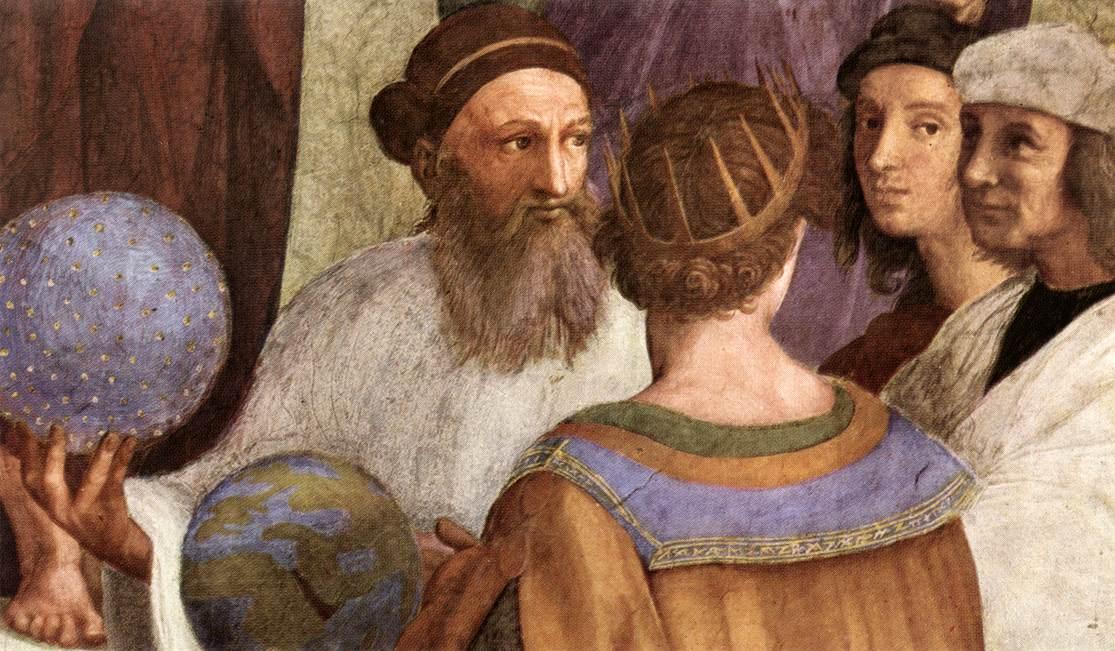
Zarathustra as depicted in Raphael's The School of Athens beside Raphael who appears as the ancient painter Apelles of Kos.

See also: Dualism, Dualism (philosophy of mind)

While there are ancient relations between the Indian Vedas and the Iranian Avesta, the two main families of the Indo-Iranian philosophical traditions were characterized by fundamental differences in their implications for the human being's position in society and their view of man's role in the universe. The first charter of human rights by Cyrus the Great as understood in the Cyrus cylinder is often seen as a reflection of the questions and thoughts expressed by Zarathustra and developed in Zoroastrian schools of thought of the Achaemenid Era of Iranian history.

=== Schools of thought ===
Ideas and tenets of Zoroastrian schools of Early Persian philosophy are part of many works written in Middle Persian and of the extant scriptures of the Zoroastrian religion in Avestan language. Among these are treatises such as the Shikand-gumanic Vichar by Mardan-Farrux Ohrmazddadan, selections of Denkard, Wizidagīhā-ī Zātspram ("Selections of Zātspram") as well as older passages of the book Avesta, the Gathas which are attributed to Zarathustra himself and regarded as his "direct teachings".

==== Zoroastrianism ====
- Zarathustra
- Jamasp
- Ostanes
- Mardan-Farrux Ohrmazddadan
- Adurfarnbag Farroxzadan
- Adurbad Emedan
- Avesta
- Gathas

Anacharsis

==== Pre-Manichaean thought ====
- Bardesanes

==== Manichaeism ====
- Mani (c. 216 – 276 CE)
- Ammo

==== Mazdakism ====
- Mazdak the Elder
- Mazdak (died c. 524 or 528 CE)

==== Zurvanism ====
- Aesthetic Zurvanism
- Materialist Zurvanism
- Fatalistic Zurvanism

=== Philosophy and the Empire ===
- Political philosophy
  - Tansar
- University of Gundishapur
  - Borzouye
  - Bakhtshooa Gondishapuri
- Emperor Khosrau's philosophical discourses
  - Paul the Persian

=== Literature ===
- Pahlavi literature

== Ancient Jewish philosophy ==
- Qohelet (c. 450-180 BCE)
- Pseudo-Aristeas (c. 2nd century BCE)
- Ben Sira (fl. 180–175 BCE)
- Aristobulus of Alexandria (181–124 BCE)
- Philo of Alexandria (30 BCE – 45 CE)
- Wisdom of Solomon (c. 1st century BCE - 1st century CE)
- 4 Maccabees (c. 1st century CE)
- Rabbi Akiva (c. 40 – c. 137 CE)

== Ancient Indian philosophy ==
The ancient Indian philosophy is a fusion of two ancient traditions: the Vedic tradition and the śramaṇa tradition.

=== Vedic philosophy ===
Indian philosophy begins with the Vedas wherein questions pertaining to laws of nature, the origin of the universe, and the place of man in it are asked. In the famous Rigvedic Hymn of Creation (Nasadiya Sukta) the poet asks:

"Whence all creation had its origin,
he, whether he fashioned it or whether he did not,
he, who surveys it all from highest heaven,
he knows—or maybe even he does not know."

In the Vedic view, creation is ascribed to the self-consciousness of the primeval being (Purusha). This leads to the inquiry into the one being that underlies the diversity of empirical phenomena and the origin of all things. Cosmic order is termed rta and causal law by karma. Nature (prakriti) is taken to have three qualities (sattva, rajas, and tamas).

- Vedas
- Upanishads
- Hindu philosophy

=== Sramana philosophy ===
Jainism and Buddhism are a continuation of the Sramana school of thought. The Sramanas cultivated a pessimistic worldview of the samsara as full of suffering and advocated renunciation and austerities. They laid stress on philosophical concepts like Ahimsa, Karma, Jnana, Samsara and Moksa. Cārvāka (Sanskrit: चार्वाक) (atheist) philosophy, also known as Lokāyata, it is a system of Hindu philosophy that assumes various forms of philosophical skepticism and religious indifference. It is named after its founder, Cārvāka, author of the Bārhaspatya-sūtras.

=== Classical Indian philosophy ===
In classical times, these inquiries were systematized in six schools of philosophy. Some of the questions asked were:

- What is the ontological nature of consciousness?
- How is cognition itself experienced?
- Is mind (chit) intentional or not?
- Does cognition have its own structure?

The six schools of Indian philosophy are:

- Nyaya
- Vaisheshika
- Samkhya
- Yoga
- Mimamsa (Purva Mimamsa)
- Vedanta (Uttara Mimamsa)

=== Ancient Indian philosophers ===
==== 1st millennium BCE ====
- Parashara – writer of Viṣṇu Purāṇa.

==== Philosophers of Vedic Age (c. 1500 – c. 600 BCE) ====
- Rishi Narayana – seer of the Purusha Sukta of the Rig Veda.
- Seven Rishis – Atri, Bharadwaja, Gautama, Jamadagni, Kasyapa, Vasishtha, Viswamitra.
- Other Vedic Rishis – Gritsamada, Sandilya, Kanva etc.
- Rishaba – Rishi mentioned in Rig Veda and later in several Puranas, and believed by Jains to be the first official religious guru of Jainism, as accredited by later followers.
- Yajnavalkya – one of the Vedic sages, greatly influenced Buddhistic thought.
- Lopamudra
- Gargi Vachaknavi
- Maitreyi
- Parshvanatha
- Ghosha
- Angiras – one of the seers of the Atharva Veda and author of Mundaka Upanishad.
- Uddalaka Aruni – an Upanishadic sage who authored major portions of Chāndogya Upaniṣad.
- Ashvapati – a King in the Later Vedic age who authored Vaishvanara Vidya of Chāndogya Upaniṣad.
- Ashtavakra – an Upanishadic Sage mentioned in the Mahabharata, who authored Ashtavakra Gita.

==== Philosophers of Axial Age (600–185 BCE) ====
- Gotama (c. 600 BCE), logician, author of Nyaya Sutra
- Kanada (c. 600 BCE), founded the philosophical school of Vaisheshika, gave theory of atomism
- Mahavira (599–527 BCE) – heavily influenced Jainism, the 24th Tirthankara of Jainism.
- Purana Kassapa
- Ajita Kesakambali
- Payasi
- Makkhali Gośāla
- Sañjaya Belaṭṭhiputta
- Mahavira
- Dandamis
- Nagasena
- Lakulisha

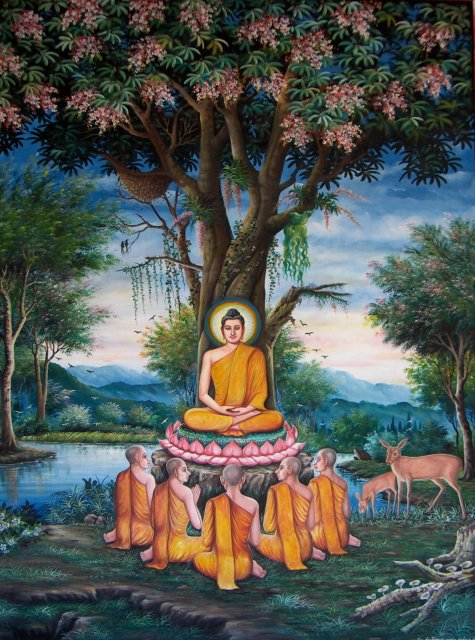
Buddha.

- Pakudha Kaccayana
- Pāṇini (520–460 BCE), grammarian, author of Ashtadhyayi
- Kapila (c. 500 BCE), proponent of the Samkhya system of philosophy.
- Badarayana (lived between 500 BCE and 400 BCE) – Author of Brahma Sutras.
- Jaimini (c. 400 BCE), author of Purva Mimamsa Sutras.
- Pingala (c. 500 BCE), author of the Chandas shastra
- Gautama Buddha (c. 480 – c. 400 BCE), founder of Buddhist school of thought
- Śāriputra
- Chanakya (c. 350 – c. 275 BCE), author of Arthashastra, professor (acharya) of political science at the Takshashila University
- Patañjali (c. 200 BCE), developed the philosophy of Raja Yoga in his Yoga Sutras.
- Shvetashvatara – Author of earliest textual exposition of a systematic philosophy of Shaivism.

==== Philosophers of Golden Age (184 BCE – 600 CE) ====
- Aśvaghoṣa, believed to have been the first Sanskrit dramatist, and is considered the greatest Indian poet before Kālidāsa
- Vatsyana, known for "Kama Sutra"
- Samantabhadra, a proponent of the Jaina doctrine of Anekantavada
- Isvarakrsna
- Aryadeva, a student of Nagarjuna and contributed significantly to the Madhyamaka
- Dharmakirti
- Haribhadra
- Pujyapada
- Buddhaghosa
- Kamandaka
- Maticandra
- Prashastapada
- Bhāviveka
- Dharmapala
- Udyotakara
- Gaudapada
- Valluvar (c. 5th century CE), wrote the Kural text, a Tamil-language treatise on morality and secular ethics
- Dignāga (c. 500), one of the founders of Buddhist school of Indian logic
- Asanga (c. 300), exponent of the Yogacara
- Bhartrihari (c. 450–510 CE), early figure in Indic linguistic theory
- Bodhidharma (c. 440–528 CE), founder of the Zen school of Buddhism
- Siddhasenadivākarasuri (5th century CE), Jain logician and author of important works in Sanskrit and Prakrit, such as Nyāyāvatāra (on logic) and Sanmatisūtra (dealing with the seven Jaina standpoints, knowledge and the objects of knowledge)
- Vasubandhu (c. 300 CE), one of the main founders of the Indian Yogacara school
- Kundakunda (2nd century CE), exponent of Jain mysticism and Jain nayas dealing with the nature of the soul and its contamination by matter, author of Pañcāstikāyasāra (Essence of the Five Existents), the Pravacanasāra (Essence of the Scripture) and the Samayasāra (Essence of the Doctrine)
- Nagarjuna (c. 150 – 250 CE), the founder of the Madhyamaka (Middle Path) school of Mahāyāna Buddhism
- Umāsvāti or Umasvami (2nd century CE), author of first Jain work in Sanskrit, Tattvārthasūtra, expounding the Jain philosophy in a most systematized form acceptable to all sects of Jainism
- Adi Shankara – philosopher and theologian, most renowned exponent of the Advaita Vedanta school of philosophy

== Ancient Chinese philosophy ==
Chinese philosophy is the dominant philosophical thought in China and other countries within the East Asian cultural sphere that share a common language, including Japan, Korea, and Vietnam.

=== Schools of thought ===
==== Hundred Schools of Thought ====
The Hundred Schools of Thought were philosophers and schools that flourished from the 6th century to 221 BCE, an era of significant cultural and intellectual expansion in China. Even though this period – known in its earlier part as the Spring and Autumn period and the Warring States period – in its latter part was fraught with chaos and bloody battles, it is also known as the Golden Age of Chinese philosophy because a broad range of thoughts and ideas were developed and discussed freely. The thoughts and ideas discussed and refined during this period have profoundly influenced lifestyles and social consciousness up to the present day in East Asian countries. The intellectual society of this era was characterized by itinerant scholars, who were often employed by various state rulers as advisers on the methods of government, war, and diplomacy. This period ended with the rise of the Qin dynasty and the subsequent purge of dissent. The Book of Han lists ten major schools, they are:

- Confucianism, which teaches that human beings are teachable, improvable, and perfectible through personal and communal endeavors, especially including self-cultivation and self-creation. The main idea of Confucianism is the cultivation of virtue and the development of moral perfection. Confucianism holds that one should give up one's life, if necessary, either passively or actively, for the sake of upholding the cardinal moral values of ren and yi.
- Legalism. Often compared with Machiavelli, and foundational for the traditional Chinese bureaucratic empire, the Legalists examined administrative methods, emphasizing a realistic consolidation of the wealth and power of autocrat and state.
- Taoism (also called Daoism), a philosophy which emphasizes the Three Jewels of the Tao: compassion, moderation, and humility, while Taoist thought generally focuses on nature, the relationship between humanity and the cosmos; health and longevity; and wu wei (action through inaction). Harmony with the Universe, or the source thereof (Tao), is the intended result of many Taoist rules and practices.
- Mohism, which advocated the idea of universal love: Mozi believed that "everyone is equal before heaven" and that people should seek to imitate heaven by engaging in the practice of collective love. His epistemology can be regarded as primitive materialist empiricism; he believed that human cognition ought to be based on one's perceptions – one's sensory experiences, such as sight and hearing – instead of imagination or internal logic, elements founded on the human capacity for abstraction. Mozi advocated frugality, condemning the Confucian emphasis on ritual and music, which he denounced as extravagant.
- Naturalism, the School of Naturalists or the Yin-yang school, which synthesized the concepts of yin and yang and the Five Elements; Zou Yan is considered the founder of this school.
- Agrarianism, or the School of Agrarianism, which advocated peasant utopian communalism and egalitarianism. The Agrarians believed that Chinese society should be modeled around that of the early sage king Shen Nong, a folk hero which was portrayed in Chinese literature as "working in the fields, along with everyone else, and consulting with everyone else when any decision had to be reached."
- The Logicians or the School of Names, which focused on definition and logic. It is said to have parallels with that of the Ancient Greek sophists or dialecticians. The most notable Logician was Gongsun Longzi.
- The School of Diplomacy or School of Vertical and Horizontal [Alliances], which focused on practical matters instead of any moral principle, stressed political and diplomatic tactics, debate, and lobbying skills. Scholars from this school were good orators, debaters, and tacticians.
- The Miscellaneous School, which integrated teachings from different schools; for instance, Lü Buwei found scholars from different schools to write a book called Lüshi Chunqiu cooperatively. This school tried to integrate the merits of various schools and avoid their perceived flaws.
- The School of "Minor-talks" was not a unique school of thought but a philosophy constructed of all the thoughts discussed by and originated from ordinary people on the street.
- Another group is the School of the Military that studied strategy and the philosophy of war; Sunzi and Sun Bin were influential leaders. However, this school was not one of the "Ten Schools" defined by Hanshu.

==== Early Imperial China ====
The founder of the Qin dynasty, who implemented Legalism as the official philosophy, quashed Mohist and Confucianist schools. Legalism remained influential until the emperors of the Han dynasty adopted Daoism and later Confucianism as official doctrine. These latter two became the determining forces of Chinese thought until the introduction of Buddhism.

Confucianism was particularly strong during the Han dynasty, whose greatest thinker was Dong Zhongshu, who integrated Confucianism with the thoughts of the Zhongshu School and the theory of the Five Elements. He also was a promoter of the New Text school, which considered Confucius as a divine figure and a spiritual ruler of China, who foresaw and started the evolution of the world towards the Universal Peace. In contrast, there was an Old Text school that advocated the use of Confucian works written in ancient language (from this comes the denomination Old Text) that were so much more reliable. In particular, they refuted the assumption of Confucius as a godlike figure and considered him as the greatest sage, but simply a human and mortal.

The 3rd and 4th centuries saw the rise of the Xuanxue (mysterious learning), also called Neo-Taoism. The most influential philosophers of this movement were Wang Bi, Xiang Xiu and Guo Xiang. The main question of this school was whether Being came before Not-Being (in Chinese, ming and wuming). A peculiar feature of these Taoist thinkers, like the Seven Sages of the Bamboo Grove, was the concept of feng liu (lit. wind and flow), a sort of romantic spirit which encouraged following the natural and instinctive impulse.

Buddhism arrived in China around the 1st century AD, but it was not until the Northern and Southern, Sui and Tang dynasties that it gained considerable influence and acknowledgement. In the beginning, it was considered a sort of Taoist sect, and there was even a theory about Laozi, founder of Taoism, who went to India and taught his philosophy to Buddha. Mahayana Buddhism was far more successful in China than its rival Hinayana, and both Indian schools and local Chinese sects arose from the 5th century. Two chiefly important monk philosophers were Sengzhao and Daosheng. But probably the most influential and original of these schools was the Chan sect, which had an even stronger impact in Japan as the Zen sect.

=== Philosophers ===
- Taoism
  - Laozi (5th–4th century BCE)
  - Zhuangzi (4th century BCE)
  - Zhang Daoling
  - Zhang Jue (died 184 CE)
  - Ge Hong (283 – 343 CE)
- Confucianism
  - Confucius
  - Mencius
  - Xun Zi (c. 312 – 230 BCE)
- Legalism
  - Li Si
  - Li Kui
  - Han Fei
  - Mi Su Yu
  - Shang Yang
  - Shen Buhai
  - Shen Dao
- Mohism
  - Mozi
  - Song Xing
- Logicians
  - Deng Xi
  - Hui Shi (380–305 BCE)
  - Gongsun Long (c. 325 – c. 250 BCE)
- Agrarianism
  - Xu Xing
- Naturalism
  - Zou Yan (305 – 240 BCE)
- Neotaoism
  - Wang Bi
  - Guo Xiang
  - Xiang Xiu
- School of Diplomacy
  - Guiguzi
  - Su Qin (380 – 284 BCE)
  - Zhang Yi (bef. 329 – 309 BCE)
  - Yue Yi
  - Li Yiji (268 – 204 BCE)
- Military strategy
  - Sunzi (c. 500 BCE)
  - Sun Bin (died 316 BCE)

== See also ==
- Index of ancient philosophy articles
- Wisdom literature
- Axial Age
