= Shan Prefecture =

Shan Prefecture may refer to:

- Shǎn Prefecture (陝州), a prefecture between the 5th and 20th centuries in modern Henan and Shanxi, China
- Shān Prefecture (山州), a prefecture between the 6th and 7th centuries in modern Thanh Hóa, Vietnam and Guangxi, China
- Shàn Prefecture (單州), a prefecture between the 9th and 14th centuries in modern Shandong and Anhui, China

== See also ==
- Shanzhou District in Sanmenxia, Henan, China
- Shan County in Shandong, China
- Shan (disambiguation)
- 山州 (disambiguation)
- Shen Prefecture
