= Cui Zhuan =

Cui Zhuan (崔譔; pinyin: Cuī Zhuàn, Wade–Giles: Ts'ui Chuan, also 崔撰 (late third–early fourth centuries) was an early commentator on the Zhuangzi before Guo Xiang’s textual revision.

He was the author of a Zhuangzi commentary in ten scrolls (juan), covering 27 chapters (7 inner and 20 outer) which is lost, but fragments can be found in the Zhuangzi yinyi by Lu Deming (ca. 550–630).

Cui Zhuan’s commentary on the Zhuangzi is (partly) preserved in Lu Deming’s Jingdian shiwen, making him to one of the earliest among the commentators from the Wei-Jin 魏晋 period whose work has survived to this day. The Jingdian shiwen (Xulu) 经典释文·序录 states that Cui Zhuan commented on 27 chapters (7 Inner Chapters and 20 Outer Chapters), while Xiang Xiu commented on 26 chapters (some sources say 27 or 28, excluding the mixed chapters).

Based on the structure (Inner and Outer sections) and the number of chapters (27), it can be inferred that Cui Zhuan and Xiang Xiu 向秀 commented on the same version of the text, even though the specific chapters they annotated do not completely coincide.

== See also ==
- Glossary of Zhuangzi exegesis

== Bibliography ==
- Guan Feng 关锋: Zhuangzi neipian yijie he pipan 庄子内篇译解和批判. Zhonghua shuju, Beijing 1961
- Livia Knaul: Lost Chuang-Tzu Passages. pp. 53-79. Society for the Study of Chinese Religions, Bulletin Volume 10, 1982 - Issue 1. Journal of Chinese Religions
- Harold D. Roth: "Chuang tzu", in: Loewe, Michael (1993). Early Chinese Texts: A Bibliographical Guide. Berkeley: The Society for the Study of Early China and the Institute of East Asian Studies
