= Cheng Xuanying =

7th-century Chinese Taoist monk

Cheng Xuanying (Chinese: 成玄英; pinyin: Chéng Xuányīng; Wade–Giles: Ch'eng Hsüan-ying; fl. 631–655), courtesy name Zishi (子實), was a Taoist monk known to posterity as the "Master of Doctrines at Xihua Abbey" (西華法師) and was one of the principal representatives of the "School of Double Mystery" (Chongxuan) during the reigns of the emperors Taizong and Gaozong of the Tang dynasty. He is mainly known for his commentaries to the Daodejing and the Zhuangzi (also known as the Nanhua Zhenjing).

== Life ==
Cheng Xuanying was born sometime around the first decade of the seventh century, in Shan Prefecture in modern-day Henan. He lived in Donghai in seclusion until 631, when he was summoned to the Tang capital Chang'an and appointed the head monk of Xihua Abbey by the imperial decree of Emperor Taizong. The New Book of Tang does not mention being accorded the title of Master of Doctrines (法師), and it is likely that this was a later fabrication of the Song period. Prior to his summoning, he was a philosopher well known for his commentary on the popular Lingbao scripture, the Clarified Meaning of the Scripture of Universal Salvation (度人經疏義). Some scholars alternatively maintain that Cheng was summoned to the capital to serve as the disciple of Liu Jinxi 劉進喜 (fl. 620), a major representative of (Chongxuan) Daoist thought at the Institute of Education (文學館).

In 636 and 638 Cheng was present for a series of debates between Daoists and Buddhists at the temple of the monk Huijing (慧凈 b.578) along with Cai Zihuang (蔡子晃), a fellow Chongxuan adherent.

Cheng, again along with Cai, participated in the translation of the Daodejing into Sanskrit in 647, headed by the eminent Buddhist monk Xuanzang. Cheng was responsible for explaining the meaning of the Daodejing to Xuanzang in order to translate it. Xuanying wanted to translate the term Dao as bodhi, but Xuanzang rejected it in favour of mārga (मार्ग "road/path"). He also requested that the Heshanggong commentary be translated as well, which Xuanzang similarly denied.

In 647 Cheng and Zhang Huiyuan (張惠元) were commissioned to investigate the major Daoist scripture known as the Sanhuangjing. They determined it was "an absurdly written document, in no way composed in the current time", and all copies of the text were then ordered burned by Emperor Taizong, leading to the near-total destruction of all copies of the scripture.

Cheng was banished to Yuzhou (郁州) around 653 following a drought during the Yonghui reign (650-655) of Emperor Gaozong, likely due to his interpretation of the Classic of Changes as explaining the occurrence of natural disasters, which the court saw as a prognostication of the drought. He died sometime between 685 and 690.

== Commentaries ==
Cheng wrote one of the more significant commentaries to the Zhuangzi, the Subcommentary to the Zhuangzi (Zhuāngzǐ shū 莊子疏). His commentary, valued for its concise explanations and character glosses, is a sub-commentary to Guo Xiang's; traditionally, both commentaries have been handed down together. Both commentaries have been handed down to posterity in the Daozang as the Commentary and Subcommentary on the True Scripture of Southern Florescence (Nánhúa Zhēnjīng Zhùshū 南華真經注疏) in 30 juan (chapters).

Cheng also wrote 2 juan of commentary on the Daodejing, and 7 juan of sub-commentary on the Laozi kaiti xujue (老子開題序訣義疏). Fragments of these texts have survived in quotations. Cheng's commentary focuses on first using the Mystery (玄 xuan) to transcend Being (有 you) and Nonbeing (無 wu), and then to transcend the Mystery itself. Cheng believed that the Dao "is eternally deep and still, it is neither form nor sound, neither personal name nor style; solitary, it alone surpasses the logic of the tetralemma, vague and indistinct it goes beyond the hundred negations".

Cheng's commentary on the Lingbao Scripture of Universal Salvation, the Clarified Meaning of the Scripture of Universal Salvation (度人經疏義), was extremely popular in its time and likely resulted in his summoning to Chang'an in 631. It is preserved in the Daozang. Additionally, Cheng composed a work in 5 juan on the Classic of Changes, the Diagram on the Circulation and Development of the Changes of Zhou (周易流演窮寂圖), which is lost and rarely-mentioned. Records of the work say it "examined across and synthesised all sixty-four hexagrams and explained the Nine Palaces, extrapolating the weal and woe of the state down to the months and days". This evaluation coincides with exegesis on the Changes found in Cheng's commentary on the Scripture of Universal Salvation.
