= Chongxuan School =

Taoist philosophical current

The Chongxuan School (Chinese: 重玄; pinyin: Chóngxuán) was a Taoist philosophical current influenced by Buddhist Madhyamaka thought. It first appeared in the fifth century, and was influential from the eighth to tenth centuries during the Tang dynasty. It was not a structured philosophical school; it was identified and named by the Daodejing commentator Du Guangting (杜光庭, 850–933). Chongxuan's most important representatives were Cheng Xuanying (成玄英, fl. 631–655) and Li Rong (李榮), both from the seventh century CE.

Chongxuan is also an appellation of the immortal embryo in internal alchemy, or Neidan, reflecting some influence of Chongxuan thought on Neidan.

== Thought ==
The Chongxuan authors continue the interpretation of a Daodejing phrase first used by the Xuanxue exegetical school, "mysterious and again mysterious". The Xuanxue thinkers deduced from this phrase the infinite depth, hence the transcendence of the Dao, and its empty nature (wú 無). The Chongxuan school, inspired by the Madhyamaka thought of the Sanlun School and the Buddhist philosopher and monk Jizang, considered the phrase to mean that there are two stages to attaining the Dao: first, to get rid of the mental illusion of being, and then that of nonbeing. A similar phrase in Daodejing chapter 48, "diminish and again diminish", is interpreted as meaning the erasure of desire in two stages: first, to eradicate desire, and then to eradicate the ultimate desire of wanting to have no desires. In practice, Jizang's "forgetfulness in two steps" (jiānwàng 兼忘) will be accomplished; this inspired the Shangqing patriarch Sima Chengzhen's seven-step instructions of the Zuowanglun. Similarity to Mahāyāna Buddhism and the soteriology of the Lingbao School is also found in some Chongxuan authors' idea that after the sage completes their spiritual path for their own benefit, they must benefit others.

On the other hand, Chongxuan thinkers also relied on the Zhuangzi, many of whose passages center around the overcoming of conceptual oppositions. Cheng Xuanying's commentary to the Zhuangzi is of great importance here.

Active at a time when the Tang state had great influence over and gave patronage to Daoist teachings, Chongxuan thinkers generally admitted the existence of social and spiritual inequality between humans, which they explain as divergence on the part of the Dao or Taiyi universal force received at birth, and by the interplay of qi, both of which depended on circumstances. This point of view already existed with Guo Xiang. On the level of chances for the advancement of spiritual progress, they distinguished brilliant minds who quickly reached the Dao, and lesser minds which needed to be guided step-by-step by a master. In politics, Chongxuan thinkers advocated a wuwei philosophy for the sovereign.

== Authors ==
Apart from Cheng Xuanying and Li Rong, the following people are also mentioned as Chongxuan thinkers: Sun Deng 孫登 (third century), Meng Zhizhou 孟智周 and Zang Xuanjing 臧玄靜 (fifth century), Zhu Rou 諸糅 and Liu Jinxi 劉進喜 (sixth century), Cai Zihuang 蔡子晃, Che Xuanbi 車玄弼, Zhang Huichao 張惠超, and Li Yuanxing 黎元興 (Tang dynasty), and Shao Ruoyu 邵若愚 and Dong Sijing 董思靖 (twelfth century).
