= Shenzhou =

Shenzhou may refer to:

- Shenzhou, or "Divine Land", one of the Chinese names of China
- Shenzhou program, a crewed spaceflight initiative by the People's Republic of China
- Shenzhou (spacecraft), spacecraft from China which first carried a Chinese astronaut into orbit in 2003
- 8256 Shenzhou, Main Belt asteroid
- Shenzhou (album), an album by ambient musician Biosphere
- Hasee, a Chinese computer company
- USS Shenzhou, a Federation starship on Star Trek: Discovery

== Locations ==
- Shenzhou City in Hebei, China
- Shen Prefecture, a prefecture between the 6th and 20th centuries in modern Hebei, China

== See also ==
- Shen Zhou (1427–1509), Ming dynasty painter
- Zhou Shen (born 1992), Chinese singer
