= Sanhuangjing =

The Sanhuangjing (三皇經, Book of Three Emperors), also known as the Sanhuang Neiwen (三皇內文) or the Sanhuangwen (三皇文), is a fundamental Daoist book which claims those who chant it can become an emperor.

The Daoist master Zheng Yin reportedly transmitted such texts as the Sanhuang Neiwen, which Zheng considered to be among the most important alchemical scriptures, to Ge Hong during the Jin dynasty. According to Ge, the Sanhuangjing was mainly about controlling and summoning ghosts and spirits, talismans and charts, and methods of meditation, and thus was a talismanic book.

All copies of the Sanhuangjing were ordered burned by Emperor Taizong of Tang in 647 CE, due to its supposed ability to bestow imperial status upon the reader. The Chongxuan school Daoist master Cheng Xuanying participated in its investigation.

Fragments of the Sanhuangjing exist in the Daozang.

== Notes ==
- 简述《三皇经》
- 第十二章 道教的主要經典及作者考
- 道符溯源－－搬至鬼神世界的权力凭证
- Ge Hong - historyofalchemy.com
- The Book of the Three Emperors - Daoinfo.org
- Forming the Image of Cheng Xuanying (ca.600-690)
