= Maoshi caomu niaoshou chongyu shu =

Chinese commentary work

Maoshi caomu niaoshou chongyu shu (simplified Chinese: 毛诗草木鸟兽虫鱼疏; traditional Chinese: 毛詩草木鳥獸蟲魚疏; lit. "Commentary on Plants, Birds, Beasts, Insects and Fish in the Mao Version of the Shijing") is an annotated commentary on botanical and zoological terms found in the Classic of Poetry (Shijing). It was written by Lu Ji 陆玑 of Eastern Wu during the Three Kingdoms period, as part of scholarship on the Mao Commentary of the text.

== Introduction ==
The work is among the earliest Chinese treatises concerned with biological topics. An appended essay discusses the transmission of the four major Shijing traditions, with particular emphasis on the Mao school. In many respects, its discussions differ markedly from those found in Lu Deming’s Jingdian shiwen 经典释文 ("Explanations of the Classics") of the Tang dynasty.

The work is included in the Gu jingjie huihan 古經解彙函, a congshu (collectaneum) compiled by the Qing scholar Zhong Qianjun 鍾謙鈞 (1805–1874).
