= Wangjiajing =

Wangjiajing may refer to:

- Wangjiajing, Shenzhou, town in Shenzhou City, Hebei, China
- Wangjiajing, Zhuji, town in Zhuji, Zhejiang, China
