= 山州 =

山州, literally "mountain prefecture", may refer to:

- Yamashiro Province of Japan located in what is today Kyoto Prefecture, for which a rare alternative name was Sanshū (山州)
- Shān Prefecture, a prefecture between the 6th and 7th centuries in modern Thanh Hóa, Vietnam and Guangxi, China
