= Dafengying Township =

Dafengying Township 大冯营乡
- Rural Township
- Dàféngyíng Xiāng
- Location in Hebei Location in China
- Coordinates: 38°00′13″N 115°43′29″E
- Country: People's Republic of China
- Province: Hebei
- Prefecture-level city: Hengshui
- County-level city: Shenzhou

Area
  - Total: 80.98 km^{2} (31.27 sq mi)

Population (2010)
  - Total: 31,908
  - Density: 394/km^{2} (1,020/sq mi)
- Time zone: UTC+8 (China Standard)

Dafengying Township (Chinese: 大冯营乡; pinyin: Dàféngyíng Xiāng) is a rural township located in Shenzhou, Hengshui, Hebei, China. According to the 2010 census, Dafengying Township had a population of 31,908, including 16,102 males and 15,806 females. The population was distributed as follows: 4,387 people aged under 14, 24,130 people aged between 15 and 64, and 3,391 people aged over 65.

== See also ==
- List of township-level divisions of Hebei
