= Bingcao Township =

Bingcao Township 兵曹乡
- Rural Township
- Bīngcáo Xiāng
- Location in Hebei Location in China
- Coordinates: 38°03′25″N 115°32′35″E
- Country: People's Republic of China
- Province: Hebei
- Prefecture-level city: Hengshui
- County-level city: Shenzhou

Area
  - Total: 30.86 km^{2} (11.92 sq mi)

Population (2010)
  - Total: 16,847
  - Density: 545.9/km^{2} (1,414/sq mi)
- Time zone: UTC+8 (China Standard)

Bingcao Township (Chinese: 兵曹乡; pinyin: Bīngcáo Xiāng) is a rural township located in Shenzhou, Hengshui, Hebei, China. According to the 2010 census, Bingcao Township had a population of 16,847, including 8,568 males and 8,279 females. The population was distributed as follows: 2,553 people aged under 14, 12,481 people aged between 15 and 64, and 1,813 people aged over 65.

== See also ==
- List of township-level divisions of Hebei
