= Xuanxue =

Post-classical Chinese philosophy bringing together Taoist and Confucian beliefs

Xuanxue (simplified Chinese: 玄学; traditional Chinese: 玄學; pinyin: Xuánxué; Wade–Giles: Hsüan^{2}-hsüeh^{2}), sometimes called Neo-Taoism or Neo-Daoism, is a metaphysical post-classical Chinese philosophy from the Six Dynasties (222-589), bringing together Taoist and Confucian beliefs through revision and discussion. The movement found its scriptural support both in Taoist and drastically reinterpreted Confucian sources. Xuanxue, or "Mystic Learning", came to reign supreme in cultural circles, especially at Jiankang during the period of division. The concept represented the more abstract, unworldly, and idealistic tendency in early medieval Chinese thought. Xuanxue philosophers combined elements of Confucianism and Taoism to reinterpret the I Ching, Daodejing and Zhuangzi.

== Definition ==
The name first compounds xuan (玄) "black, dark; mysterious, profound, abstruse, arcane." It occurs in the first chapter of the Daodejing ("玄之又玄，眾妙之門"). The word xuan literally depicts a shade of deep, mystical, dark red. Daodejing speaks of the Dao as Xuan, more specifically underpinning the depth, utter impenetrability, and the profound mystery of the Dao.

Xue (學) means "study, learn, learning"; thus, xuanxue is literally the "learning" or "study" of the "arcane", "mysterious", or "profound". Therefore, the meaning of xuanxue can be described as "study of the mysterious or profound".

In Modern Standard Chinese usage, xuanxue can mean "Neo-Taoism", "esoteric", "metaphysics", "spiritualism", or "mysticism". The New Treatise on the Uniqueness of Consciousness by Xiong Shili defines Xuanxue as "dark/obscure/mysterious/profound learning". The concept can be described by such abstractions as "to initiate no action", "emptiness", "one and the many", "root and branches", "having and not having", and the "emotional responses" and "pattern".

In modern Chinese, Xuanxue is also taken to refer to astrology, geomancy and other popular religious arts. Another translation of xuanxue could be "learning of the dark."

== History ==
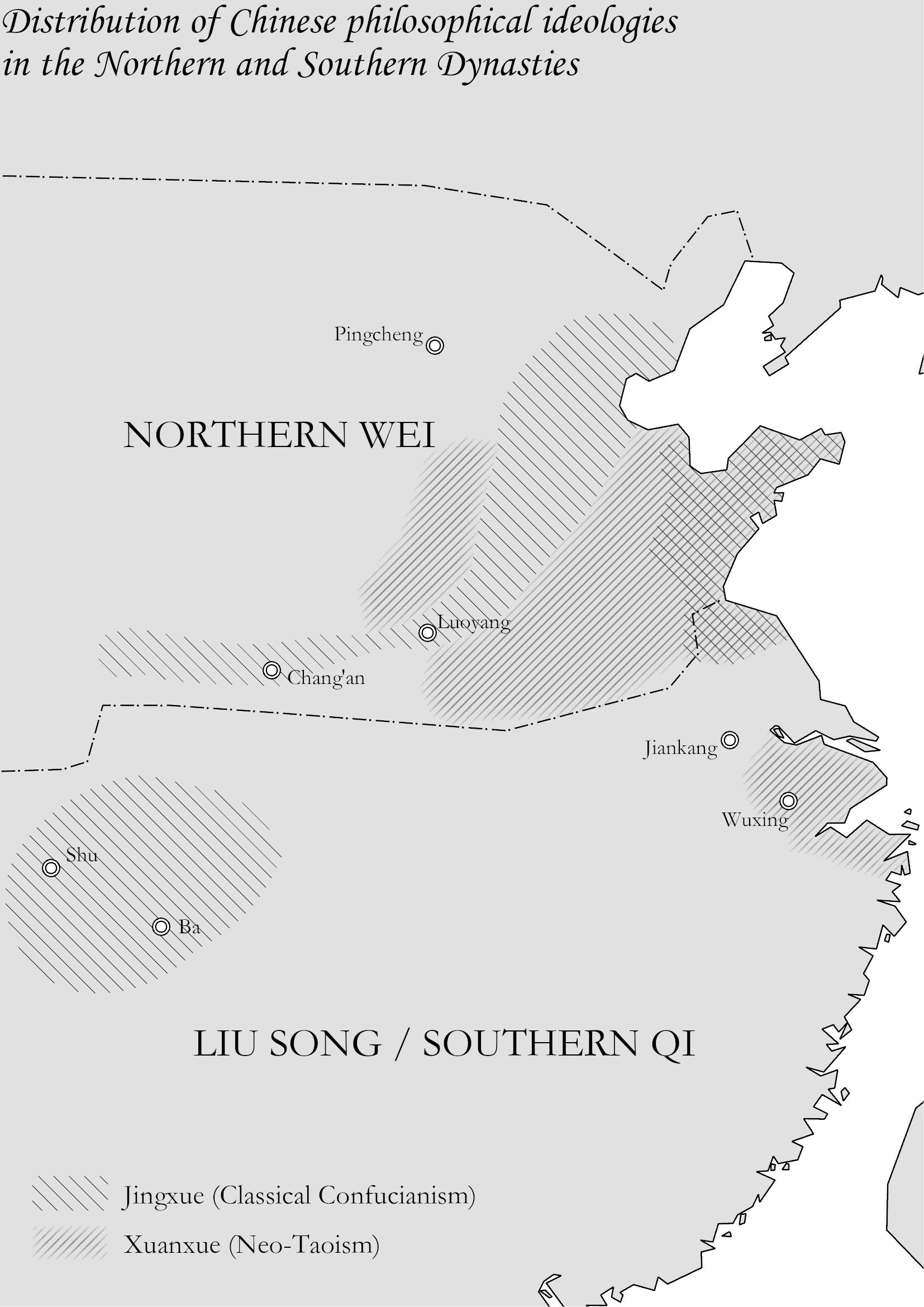
Distribution of philosophical ideologies (Jingxue and Xuanxue) during the Northern and Southern Dynasties

Xuanxue arose after the Han dynasty (206 BCE-220 CE) in early Medieval China. It is mainly represented by a few scholars, namely Wang Bi (226-249), He Yan (d. 249), Xiang Xiu (223?-300), Guo Xiang (d. 312) and Pei Wei (267-300). In general, these scholars sought to reinterpret the social and moral understanding of Confucianism in ways to make it more compatible with Taoist philosophy. Xuanxue philosophers of the Han dynasty were concerned with restoring unity and harmony to the land, not by condemning the teachings of the sages, but by interpreting them in new ways. Xuanxue thinkers thereby developed their theories by reinterpreting the relationship between Taoist and Confucian texts through an appreciation of their common themes. Through this syncretic movement, the "Way of Mysterious Learning" (Xuanxue) emerged. These post-Han Confucians saw Han Confucianism as restrictive and out of touch with ordinary society, and sought to incorporate Taoist ideas of natural human behaviour. However, such scholars did not agree on how this incorporation was to be accomplished: some argued that morality came from nature and should be aligned with nature; others argued that it was natural to bypass morality and follow nature directly; another group argued that morality itself was nature and simply needed to be purified from the hypocritical use of Confucianism to restrict individuality. Xuanxue constitutes a major stage in the development of Confucianism as some of their commentaries became standard interpretations of Confucianism during the Tang period.

Two influential Xuanxue scholars were Wang Bi and Guo Xiang, editors and leading commentators on the Daodejing and Zhuangzi, respectively. For instance, the Daodejing exists in two received versions named after the commentaries. While the "Heshang Gong version" explains textual references to Daoist meditation, the "Wang Bi version" does not. Richard Wilhelm said the Wang Bi commentary changed the Daodejing "from a compendiary of magical meditation to a collection of free philosophical aperçus."

One of the major defining features of Zhengshi Xuanxue is the "Pure Conversation" (清談) gatherings that took place among political and intellectual elites from the 3rd century onward, through which intellectuals questioned tradition and shared their ideas during the Wei-Jin and Six Dynasties periods. These sessions were transformed versions of the more politically charged "Pure Criticism" (清議) protests of the later Han, which were, in turn, continuations of political remonstration practices. Much of Xuanxue had become divorced from the realities of life and afforded an escape from it.

During the 5th-century CE, Xuanxue formed a part of the official curriculum at the Guozijian, together with Rú (Confucian learning), Literature, and History. Although Xuanxue does not represent one monolithic school of thought, it does encompass a broad range of philosophical positions.

== Function ==
The goal of Xuanxue is to bring to light the nature and function of Dao, which appears dark and impenetrable. It started from the assumption that all temporally and spatially limited phenomena (anything "nameable"; all movement, change, and diversity; in short, all "being") is produced and sustained by one impersonal principle, which is unlimited, unnameable, unmoving, unchanging, and undiversified. Rather than a school of set doctrines, Xuanxue is a broad, dynamic intellectual front. Many Xuanxue scholars argued that "words cannot fully express meaning," as meaning transcends the limiting confines of language. Xuanxue seeks to bring together Confucian and Daoist ideologies with fresh annotation and discourse, working with the classical definitions, doctrines, and rules set by previous philosophers.

The concept of Wú is central to Xuanxue. It is translated as "nothing", "nothingness", "non-being", and "negativity". The Tao can literally only be described as nameless and formless, not having any characteristics of things. That the Tao is the "mother of all life" is also central to Xuanxue ideology. Because of the Tao being the beginning of all things, while simultaneously being indescribable and non-being, the Tao is said to be "dark" or "mysterious" (xuan).

== Misinterpretations ==
Xuanxue should not be misinterpreted as interchangeable with the Dao. Rather, Xuanxue is the study of the mystery and darkness of the intangible. Dao represents xuan, the mystical that is central to the philosophy. The Dao supplies the subject matter/basis for the "Mystic Learning" that underpins the thinkings and teachings of Xuanxue.

Xuanxue aims at unlocking the mystery of the Dao, but should not be confused with a revival of preceding schools of Taoism. Xuanxue is committed to analytic rigor and clarity in explicating the meaning of Dao, employing the new, contemporary language of the time. However, critics sometimes condemn it as "dark" because they judge it as obfuscating and detrimental to the flourishing of Dao. They use phrases like "dark words" (xuanyan) or "dark discourse" (xuanlun) in a pejorative sense, indicating that to them Xuanxue was nothing but convoluted empty talk. In these contexts, xuan may be translated as "abstruse", "obscure", or words to that effect.

To classify Xuanxue as merely "Neo-Taoism" misleadingly reinforces suggestions that Wei-Jin thinkers were only "reinterpreting Confucianism through the lens of Taoism" (Chan 2010: 5). Chan points out that since xuan (玄) is already something "obscure" and "insubstantial" in Chinese, xuanxue can be left "untranslated, though not unexplained" (Chan 2010: 6). Xuanxue is also often classified as "Profound Learning". Although "profound" is more appropriate than "dark", ambiguity is still an issue with this classification.

Xuanxue is not a kind of scholasticism that pitches one school against another. Instead of seeing them as attempting to reconcile Confucianism with Taoism, it may be suggested that they were primarily concerned with the substantive issue of the relationship between mingjiao and ziran.
