= Chenshi =

Chenshi 辰时镇
- Town
- Chénshí Zhèn
- Location in Hebei Location in China
- Coordinates: 38°03′14″N 115°41′53″E
- Country: People's Republic of China
- Province: Hebei
- Prefecture-level city: Hengshui
- County-level city: Shenzhou

Area
  - Total: 105.5 km^{2} (40.7 sq mi)

Population (2010)
  - Total: 41,629
  - Density: 394.5/km^{2} (1,022/sq mi)
- Time zone: UTC+8 (China Standard)

Chenshi (Chinese: 辰时镇; pinyin: Chénshí Zhèn) is a town located in Shenzhou, Hengshui, Hebei, China. According to the 2010 census, Chenshi had a population of 41,629, including 21,168 males and 20,461 females. The population was distributed as follows: 5,905 people aged under 14, 31,281 people aged between 15 and 64, and 4,443 people aged over 65.

== See also ==
- List of township-level divisions of Hebei
