= Jingdian Shiwen =

Chinese exegetical dictionary (c. 583)

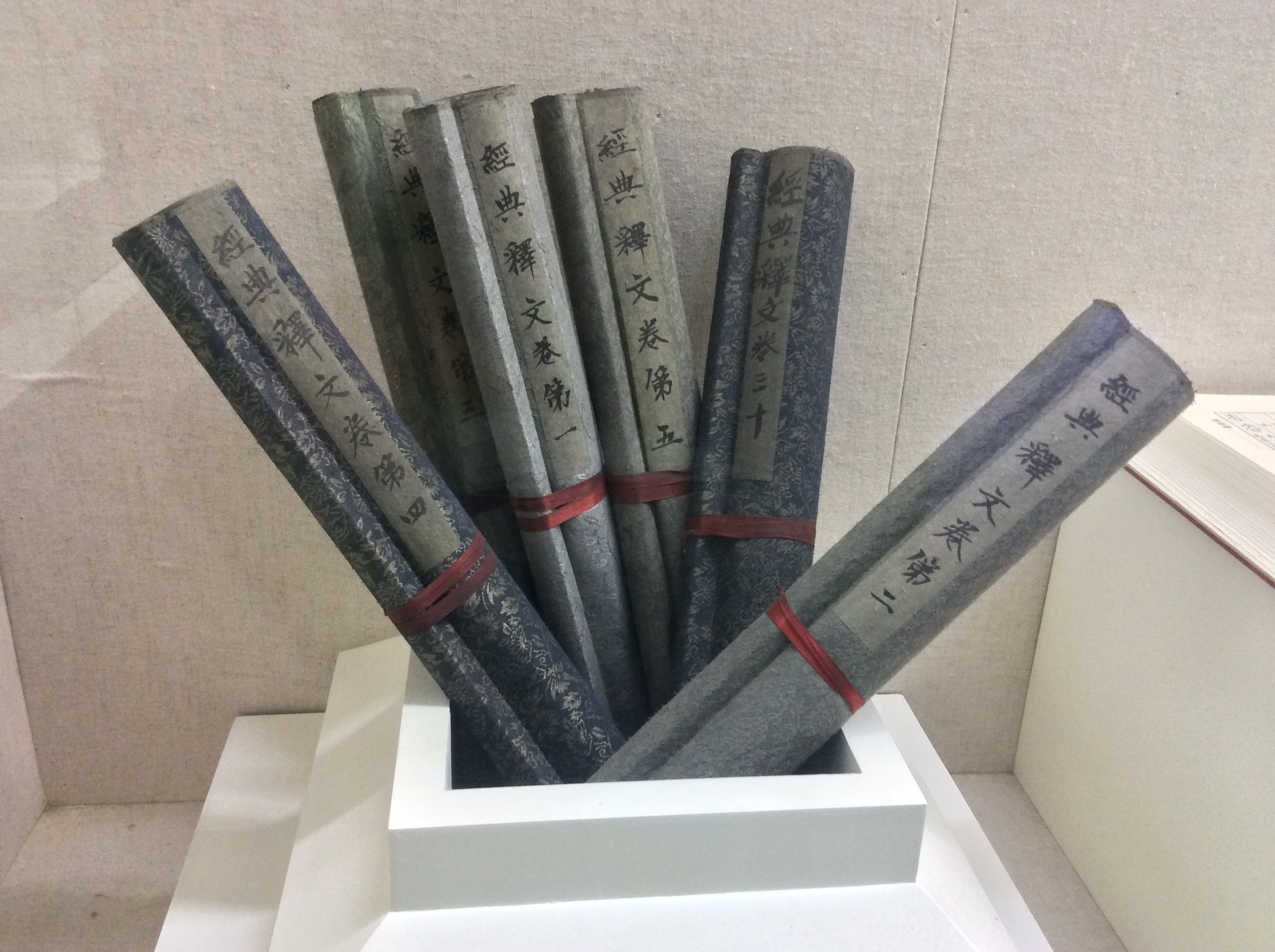
- Jingdian Shiwen scrolls in the Chinese Dictionary Museum, Jincheng, Shanxi

Chinese name
- Traditional Chinese: 經典釋文
- Simplified Chinese: 经典释文
- Literal meaning: Explaining words used in the classics
Transcriptions
Standard Mandarin
- Hanyu Pinyin: Jīngdiǎn shìwén
- Bopomofo: ㄐㄧㄥ ㄉㄧㄢˇ ㄕˋ ㄨㄣ
- Wade–Giles: Ching¹-tien³ shih⁴-wên²
Wu
- Suzhounese: Cin1tie3 seq7ven2
Yue: Cantonese
- Yale Romanization: Gīngdín sīkmàhn
- Jyutping: Ging1din2 sik1man4
Southern Min
- Hokkien POJ: Keng-tián siak-bûn
Middle Chinese
- Middle Chinese: keng tenX syek mjun
Old Chinese
- Baxter–Sagart (2014): *k-lˤeŋ tˤə[r]ʔ l̥Ak mə[n]

Korean name
- Hangul: 경전석문
- Hanja: 經典釋文
Transcriptions
- Revised Romanization: Gyeongjeon seongmun
- McCune–Reischauer: Kyŏngjŏn sŏngmun

Japanese name
- Kanji: 経典釈文
- Hiragana: けいてんしゃくもん
Transcriptions
- Romanization: Keiten shakumon

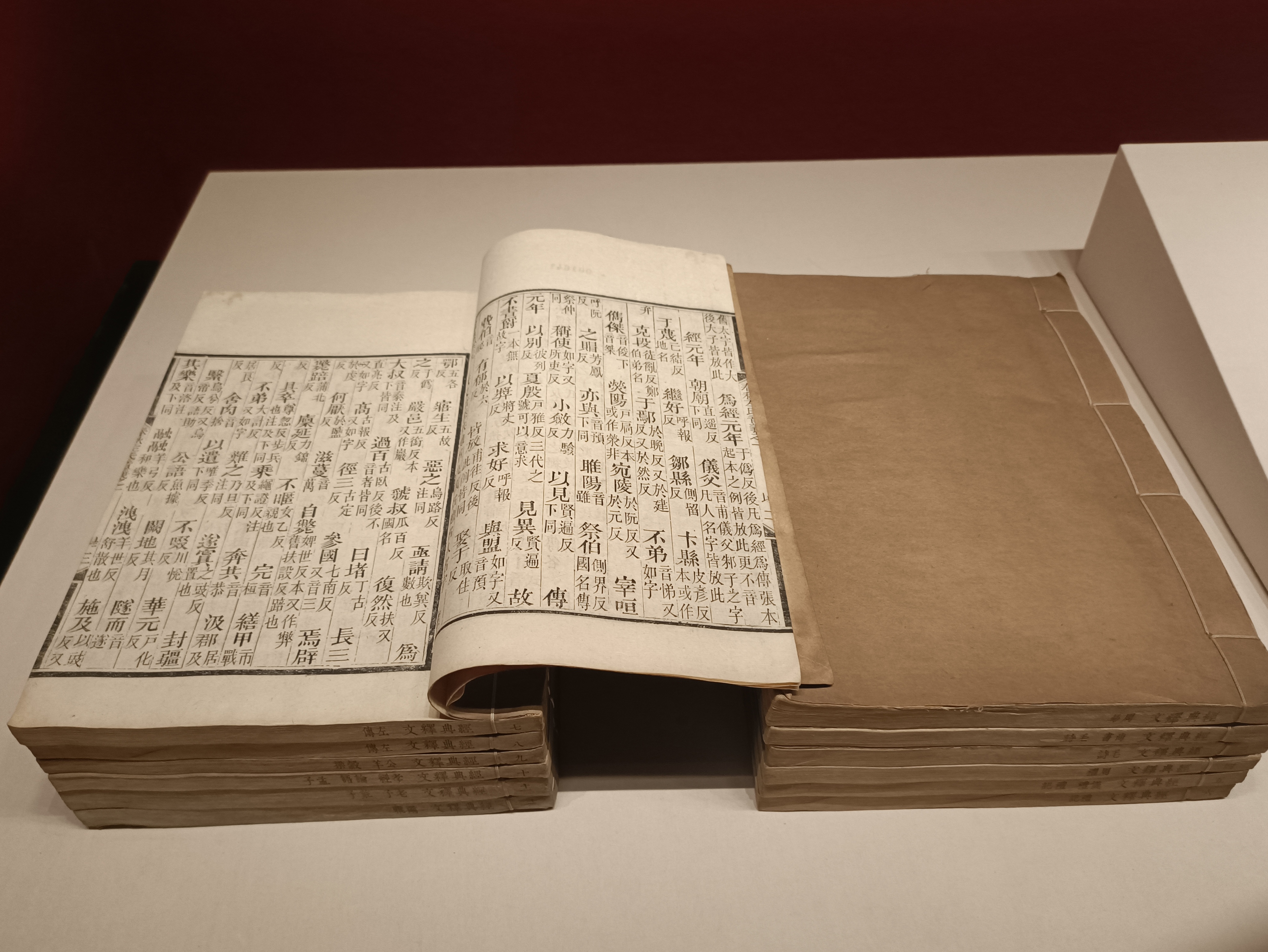
An exhibit of Jingdian Shiwen in the Chengdu Library

The Jingdian Shiwen, often simply referred to as the Shiwen by Chinese philologists, was a Chinese dictionary compiled by the scholar Lu Deming c. 583. Based on the works of 230 scholars whose work spanned the Han, Wei, and Six Dynasties periods, the work provides exegetical commentary on the evolution of words present in the Confucian Thirteen Classics and the Daoist Tao Te Ching and Zhuangzi. Namely, it tracks the gradual shifts in both the meaning and pronunciation of classical words. to It also cites numerous ancient works that no longer exist; citations which for some constitute the only documentary evidence of their previous existence.

The dictionary's pronunciations are given by fanqie annotations, and have proved invaluable for historical linguists studying the Middle Chinese stage of the language's history. Sinologist Bernhard Karlgren considered the Jingdian Shiwen and the Qieyun, a rime dictionary assembled in 601, as the two primary sources for the reconstruction of Middle Chinese. Many studies in Chinese historical linguistics use data from the Jingdian Shiwen .
