= Shen Prefecture =

Historical administrative division in Hebei, China

- Chinese: 深州
Transcriptions
Standard Mandarin
- Hanyu Pinyin: Shēn Zhōu
- Wade–Giles: Shên Chou

Shen Prefecture, also known by its Chinese name as Shen Zhou or Shenzhou, was a prefecture (zhou) of imperial China around modern Shenzhou in Hebei Province, China.

It existed intermittently from 596 to 1913. Under the late Tang, it formed part of the de facto independent Chengde Province that became the Zhao Kingdom between 910 and 922.

The modern city Shenzhou, established in 1994, retains its name.
