= Payasi =

Pāyāsi or Paesi is a legendary king mentioned in the ancient Buddhist and Jain texts of India. In these legends, he appears as a materialist who orders several experiments to conclude that the soul does not exist. A Jain or Buddhist monk proves him wrong in a debate, and converts him to their faith.

== Legends ==
Neither is there any other-world, nor are there beings reborn otherwise than from parents, nor is there fruit of deeds, well done or ill done.

— Payasi, in the Buddhist legend of Payasi-suttanta

According to Buddhist and Jain legends, Paesi ordered several cruel experiments to conclude that the soul does not exist. For example, he had a thief thrown alive in a brass pot, with a brass lid soldered over it, to see how his soul could escape after his death. Buddhist and Jain works mention similar accounts of other people conducting such experiments to deny the existence of soul. In all these accounts, a Buddhist or Jain monk defeats the person denying the existence of the soul in a debate. E.g. in Haribhadra's Samaraichcha Katha (Samarditya Katha), a man named Pingakesa states that a robber sentenced to death had been put in a sealed iron vessel, but no soul was observed escaping from the vessel after his death. Jain monk Vijaya-simha refutes this argument by stating that a conch-blower had similarlly been put into an iron vessel, but when he blew his conch, the sound was heard outside although it could not be seen being emitted from the sealed vessel. Such stories seem to be fabricated by the authors to promote their doctrine, and have no historical basis.

According to Willem Bollée, a comparison of the Buddhist and Jain versions of the legend suggests that one is not borrowed from the other: both legends seem to originate from a common ancient and popular legend.

=== Jain legend ===
The story of Paesi (Paesi-kahāṇayaṃ or Pradeśi-kathānaka) is the kernel of Rāya-paseṇiya, (Note: Also transliterated as Rāyapaseṇaijja or Rayapasenaiya (Sanskrit: Rājapraśnīya or Rāja-praśnī)) which is a part of the Śvetāmbara canon. Mahavira narrates the story to his pupil Goyama as follows (Sanskrit names in brackets):

In his last birth, the god Sūriyābha (Sūryābha) was born as Paesi (Pradeśin), the materialist ruler of Seyaviyā (Setavyā or Shravasti). One day, he met Kesi (Keśin), a princely renouncer. The two men engaged in a debate about the existence of a soul independent of the body. Kesi convinced Paesi to give up materialism. Paesi became a pious lay Jain, and stopped paying attention to the state affairs and his queens. His queen Sūriyakantā felt neglected and committed suicide. Paesi was then reborn as the god Sūriyābha in Sohammakappa. Mahavira tells Goyama that Paesi will attain the final emancipation in his next and final birth.

=== Buddhist legend ===
A dialogue between Pāyāsi and Kumāra Kassapa appears in the Payasi-suttanta of Digha Nikaya. Payasi states that there is no afterlife and that acts do not have any consequences. In the ensuing debate, Kassapa refutes his arguments. For example, Payasi says that he had requested his relatives on their deathbed to return or send a message to him from the afterlife, but there was no response. Kassapa argues that:

- the relatives did not have permission from the "infernal guardians" to return
- they did not want to return because the afterlife was better than this world
- a divine day and night equals a hundred human years, so Payasi should not expect a response so soon

Payasi doubts the existence of the Tavatimsa gods. Kassapa compares him to a blind man who denies the existence of the sun and the moon because he cannot see them.

Payasi questions if the afterlife is better, why don't pious people kill themselves and end their present lives. Kassapa gives the example of the pregnant second wife of a Brahmin, who was on his deathbed. The Brahmin's son from his first wife claimed his inheritance. The second wife cut open her belly hoping to bring her own son into the world before the Brahmin's death, to claim the inheritance. Because of this foolish act, she died: a person killing himself prematurely in order to attain afterlife would be behaving in a similar way.

Payasi then discusses several experiments that he had conducted on convicted criminals to prove that soul does not exist:

- Once he had a criminal thrown into a jar, closed the lid, and had the jar heated. When the man died, he had the lid opened, but did not see a soul escape. Kassapa argues that Payasi's servants cannot see his living soul, therefore, he should not expect to see the soul of a dead man.
- Once he had a criminal weighed, strangled to death, and then weighed again. The criminal's dead body was heavier than his living body (in another version of the legend, there is no difference in weight). Kassapa attributes this to the difference between the weight of the air and the life.
- Once he had a nearly-dead criminal hit (with stick and hand) and shaken, but he did not see a soul escaping the criminal's body. Kassapa states that merely hitting or shaking a conch does not produce a sound. Just like the blower's breath is necessary to produce a sound from the conch, a body needs vital power (ayu) to act.
- Once, he had a criminal flayed alive and cut up, but he did not see a soul. Kassapa compares him to a little boy who saw a fire getting extinguished, and attempted to find the fire in the remaining pieces of wood.

Payasi then states that he cannot give up his materialistic beliefs because he is afraid of being laughed at by foreign kings. Kassapa then narrates four short anecdotes to convince him otherwise. Ultimately, Payasi is convinced that he was wrong and converts to Buddhism.

== See also ==
- 21 grams experiment
