= Shān Prefecture =

Former prefecture in Guangxi, China

Shān Prefecture (Chinese: 山州) was a zhou (prefecture) in imperial China in modern Guangxi, China.
