= Xiang Xiu =

3rd-century Chinese scholar and writer

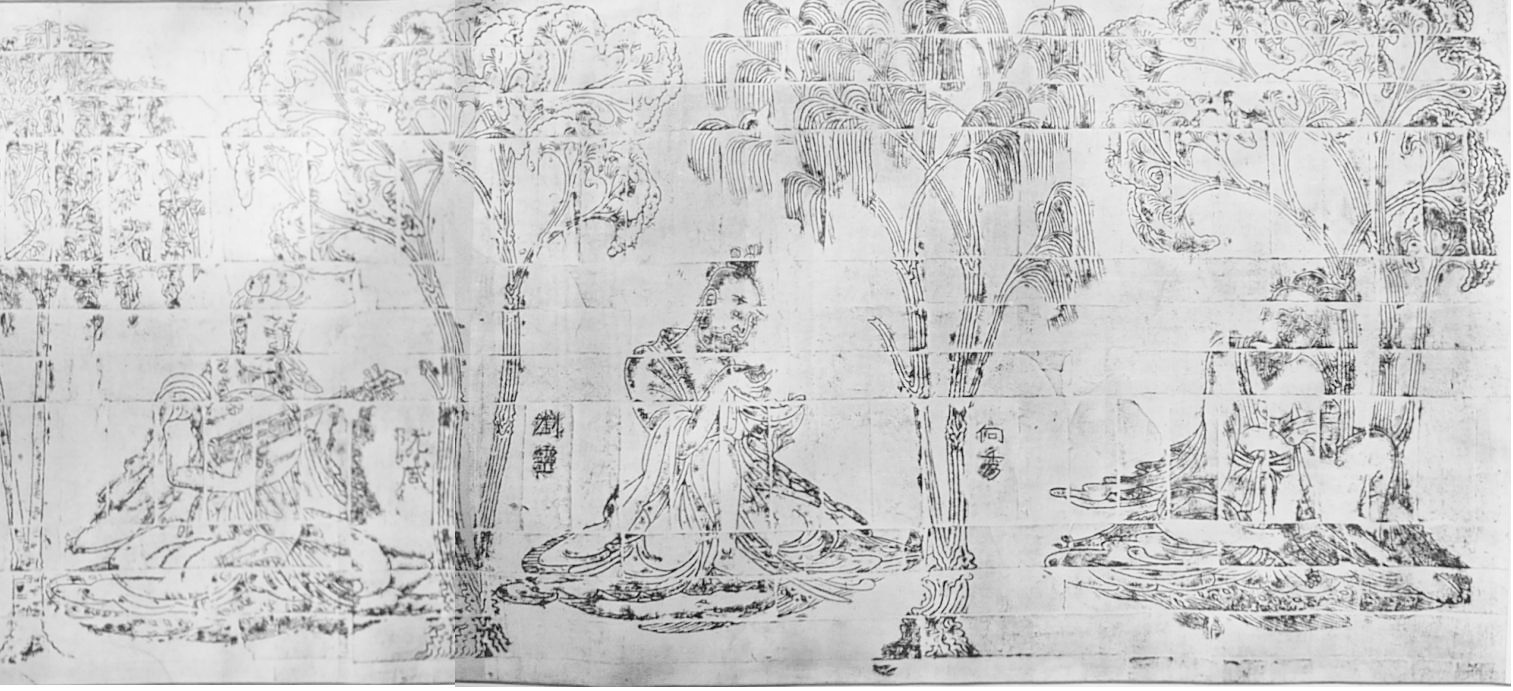
The Seven Sages of the Bamboo Grove

Xiang Xiu (Chinese: 向秀) is one of the Seven Sages of the Bamboo Grove. Members of Seven Sages of the Bamboo Grove sought to escape the corruption and dangers of political life by retreating to a rural setting to drink wine and compose poetry.

Xiang Xiu was known for his free-thinking and eccentric nature. He authored the work Sijiufu ("Reminiscence"). Alongside Guo Xiang, a contemporary Neo-Daoist philosopher, Xiang Xiu also contributed to the Zhuangzizhu, a significant commentary on the works of the early Daoist philosopher Zhuangzi. While Xiang Xiu's specific life details are less documented than some of the other Sages, his association with this group highlights his intellectual pursuits and his desire to live a life free from the constraints of court politics. The Sages' retreat served as an inspiration for later Chinese writers facing difficult times.

His most famous contribution is a commentary on the Zhuangzi, which was later used and amended by Guo Xiang. After his friend Xi Kang (Ji Kang) was killed by the ruling Jin dynasty, Xiang carefully interpreted his previous antagonistic words to the emperor, Sima Zhao in a new light. Thus he avoided the charge of treason, unlike his friend.

He wrote the work Xiang Xiu Biequan ("Separate Biography").

== See also ==
- Guo Xiang
