= Shǎn Prefecture =

Historical administrative division in Henan, China

Shanzhou or Shan Prefecture (陝州) was a zhou (prefecture) in imperial China, centering on modern Shan County, Henan, China. It was created in 487 by the Northern Wei and existed (intermittently) until 1913 after the establishment of the Republic.

== See also ==
- Shaanxi, a modern Chinese province
