= Shenzhou City =

Shenzhou 深州市
- County-level city
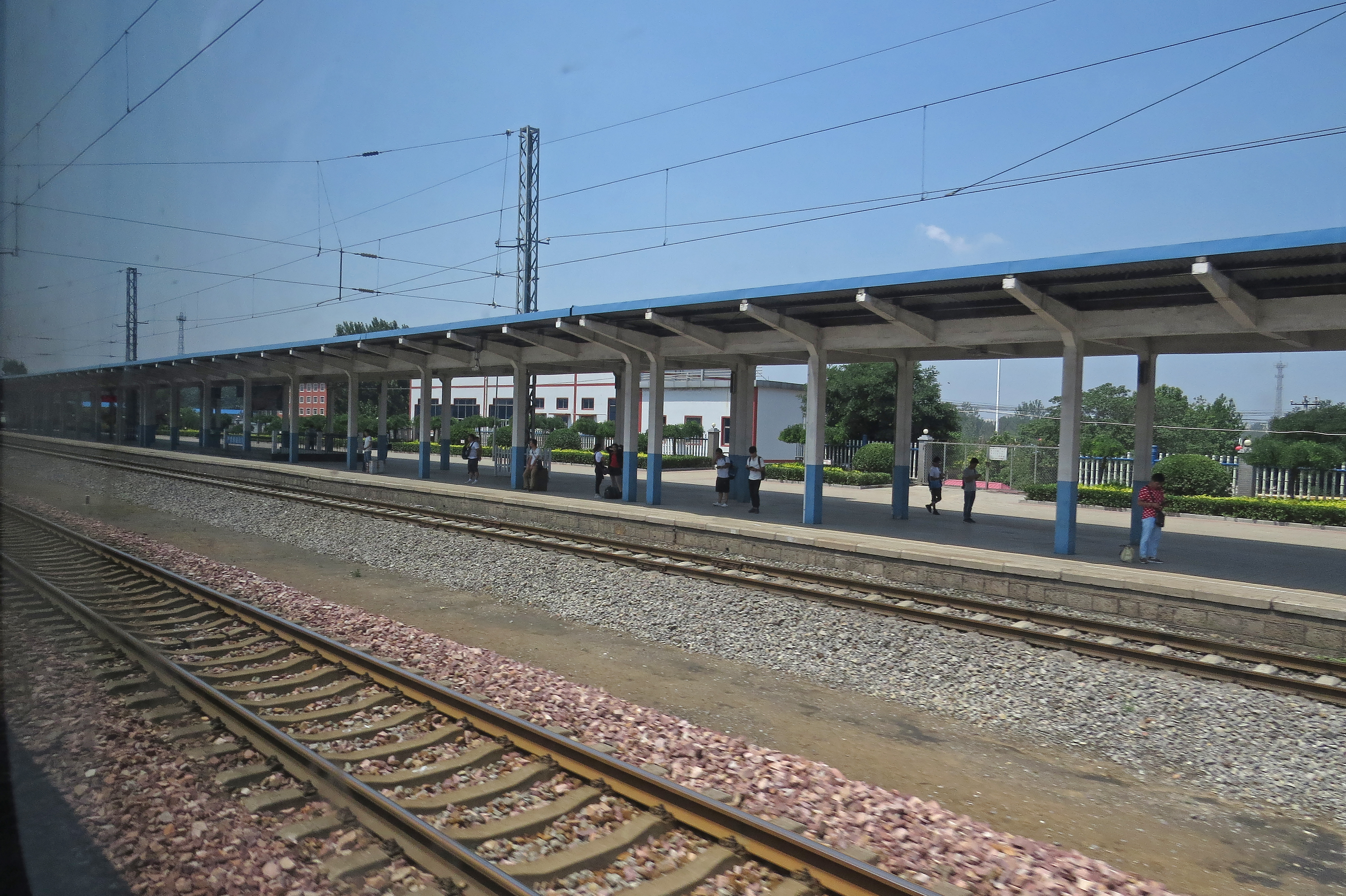
- Platform of Shenzhou railway station

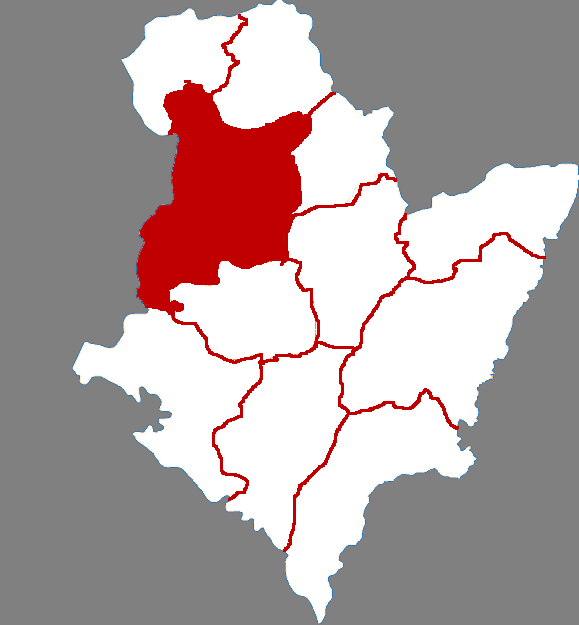
- Shenzhou in Hengshui

- Location in Hebei
- Coordinates: 38°00′07″N 115°33′36″E
- Country: People's Republic of China
- Province: Hebei
- Prefecture: Hengshui

Area
  - County-level city: 1,252.0 km^{2} (483.4 sq mi)
  - Urban: 83.19 km^{2} (32.12 sq mi)

Population (2017)
  - County-level city: 613,000
  - Density: 490/km^{2} (1,270/sq mi)
  - Urban: 191,000
- Time zone: UTC+8 (China Standard)
- Postal code: 053300

Shenzhou (Chinese: 深州; pinyin: Shēnzhōu) is a county-level city under the administration of the prefecture-level city of Hengshui, Hebei province, China.

== Administrative divisions ==
Towns:

- Tangfeng (唐奉镇), Shenzhou Town (深州镇), Chenshi (辰时镇), Yuke (榆科镇), Weiqiao (魏桥镇), Dadi (大堤镇), Qianmotou (前磨头镇), Wangjiajing (王家井镇), Hujiachi (护驾迟镇)

Townships:

- Bingcao Township (兵曹乡), Mucun Township (穆村乡), Dong'anzhuang Township (东安庄乡), Beixicun Township (北溪村乡), Dafengying Township (大冯营乡), Qiaotun Township (乔屯乡), Taiguzhuang Township (太古庄乡), Datun Township (大屯乡)

== Climate ==
Climate data for Shenzhou, elevation 26 m (85 ft), (1991–2020 normals, extremes 1981–present)
| Month | Jan | Feb | Mar | Apr | May | Jun | Jul | Aug | Sep | Oct | Nov | Dec | Year |
|---|---|---|---|---|---|---|---|---|---|---|---|---|---|
| Record high °C (°F) | 16.3 (61.3) | 22.5 (72.5) | 31.4 (88.5) | 33.1 (91.6) | 40.6 (105.1) | 39.9 (103.8) | 42.7 (108.9) | 37.6 (99.7) | 35.4 (95.7) | 31.6 (88.9) | 25.9 (78.6) | 18.3 (64.9) | 42.7 (108.9) |
| Mean daily maximum °C (°F) | 3.2 (37.8) | 7.5 (45.5) | 14.6 (58.3) | 21.8 (71.2) | 27.5 (81.5) | 32.1 (89.8) | 32.4 (90.3) | 30.7 (87.3) | 27.0 (80.6) | 20.7 (69.3) | 11.5 (52.7) | 4.6 (40.3) | 19.5 (67.1) |
| Daily mean °C (°F) | −2.2 (28.0) | 1.5 (34.7) | 8.2 (46.8) | 15.3 (59.5) | 21.3 (70.3) | 26.1 (79.0) | 27.4 (81.3) | 25.8 (78.4) | 21.3 (70.3) | 14.5 (58.1) | 6.0 (42.8) | −0.4 (31.3) | 13.7 (56.7) |
| Mean daily minimum °C (°F) | −6.3 (20.7) | −3.0 (26.6) | 3.0 (37.4) | 9.7 (49.5) | 15.6 (60.1) | 20.6 (69.1) | 23.0 (73.4) | 21.7 (71.1) | 16.8 (62.2) | 9.7 (49.5) | 1.9 (35.4) | −4.1 (24.6) | 9.1 (48.3) |
| Record low °C (°F) | −18.3 (−0.9) | −16.3 (2.7) | −11.2 (11.8) | −1.6 (29.1) | 5.9 (42.6) | 10.7 (51.3) | 16.7 (62.1) | 13.5 (56.3) | 5.3 (41.5) | −2.3 (27.9) | −15.8 (3.6) | −21.9 (−7.4) | −21.9 (−7.4) |
| Average precipitation mm (inches) | 1.6 (0.06) | 5.3 (0.21) | 8.1 (0.32) | 26.4 (1.04) | 37.0 (1.46) | 58.7 (2.31) | 126.9 (5.00) | 109.0 (4.29) | 39.1 (1.54) | 27.5 (1.08) | 13.2 (0.52) | 2.9 (0.11) | 455.7 (17.94) |
| Average precipitation days (≥ 0.1 mm) | 1.5 | 2.2 | 2.3 | 4.9 | 6.1 | 8.0 | 10.8 | 9.8 | 6.1 | 5.0 | 3.1 | 1.7 | 61.5 |
| Average snowy days | 2.8 | 2.8 | 0.8 | 0.2 | 0 | 0 | 0 | 0 | 0 | 0 | 1.3 | 2.3 | 10.2 |
| Average relative humidity (%) | 57 | 52 | 49 | 54 | 57 | 59 | 75 | 79 | 70 | 64 | 64 | 60 | 62 |
| Mean monthly sunshine hours | 164.5 | 170.4 | 223.1 | 249.7 | 274.3 | 250.6 | 212.0 | 216.6 | 211.8 | 200.4 | 166.3 | 159.5 | 2,499.2 |
| Percentage possible sunshine | 54 | 55 | 60 | 63 | 62 | 57 | 48 | 52 | 57 | 59 | 55 | 54 | 56 |
Source: China Meteorological AdministrationAll-time June low
