= Guo Xiang =

Chinese scholar (252–312)

Guo Xiang (Chinese: 郭象; pinyin: Guō Xiàng; Wade–Giles: Kuo Hsiang; 252–312) is credited with the first and most important revision of the text known as the Zhuangzi which, along with the Tao Te Ching, forms the textual and philosophical basis of the Taoist school of thought. He was also a scholar of xuanxue.

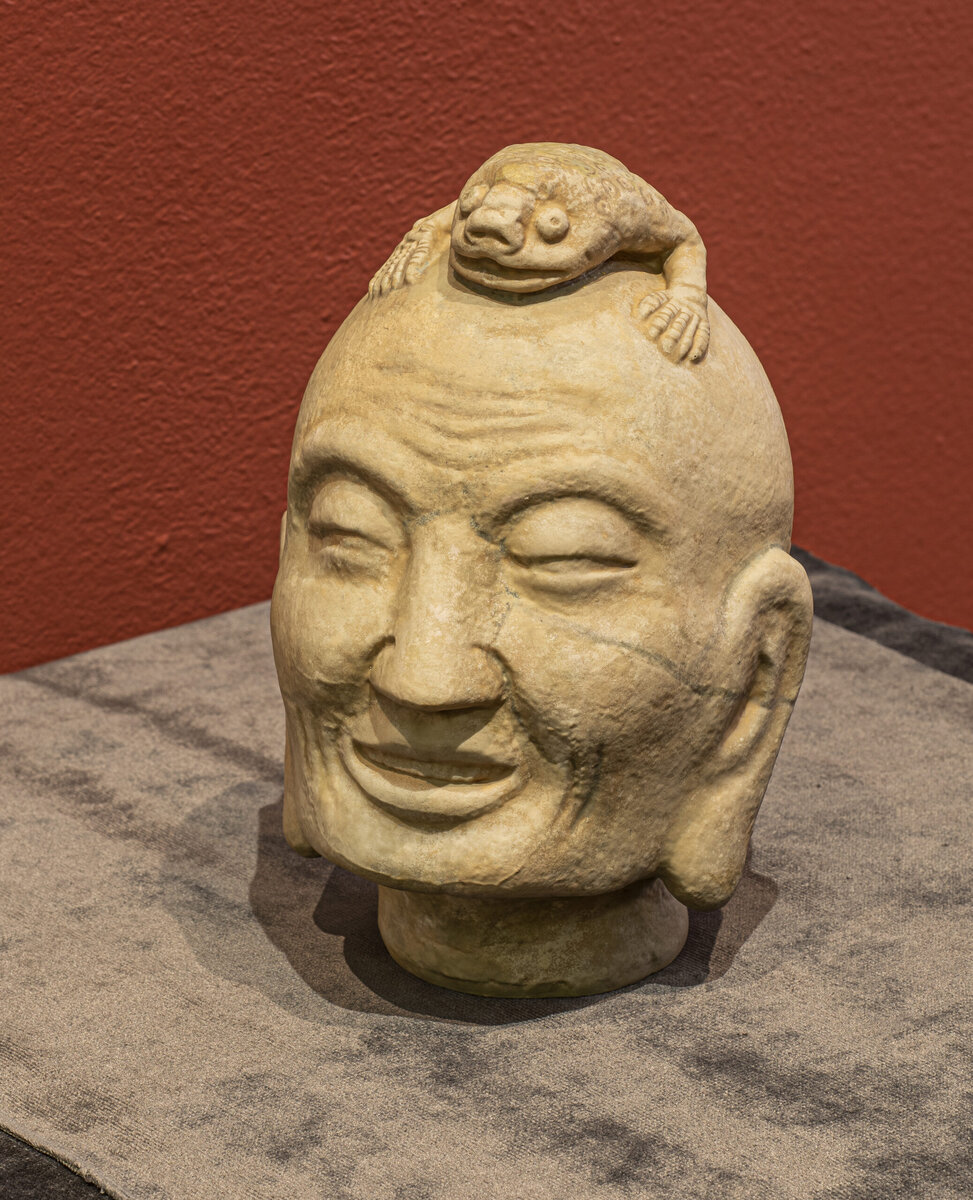
Guo Xiang Mask

== Zhuangzi ==
The Guo Xiang redaction of Zhuangzi revised a fifty-two chapter original by removing material he thought was superstitious and generally not of philosophical interest to his literati sensibilities, resulting in a thirty-three chapter total. He appended a philosophical commentary to the text that became famous, and within four centuries his shorter and snappier expurgated recension became the only one known.

This Zhuangzi recension is traditionally divided into three sections: ‘Inner Chapters’ (1-7), ‘Outer Chapters’ (8-22), ‘Miscellaneous Chapters’ (23-33). This division is quite old and is likely to have been part of the original recension.

Guo's redaction focuses on his understanding of Zhuangzi's philosophy of spontaneity (Chinese: 自然; pinyin: zìrán; Wade–Giles: tzu jan; literally "self so"). This practiced spontaneity is demonstrated by the story of Cook Ding, rendered as Cook Ting in the Burton Watson translation (which is itself ultimately derived from the Guo Xiang recension):

Cook Ting was cutting up an ox for Lord Wen-hui. At every touch of his hand, every heave of his shoulder, every move of his feet, every thrust of his knee, zip! zoop! He slithered the knife along with a zing, and all was in perfect rhythm, as though he were performing the dance of the Mulberry Grove or keeping time to the Ching-shou Music.

"Ah, this is marvelous!" said Lord Wen-hui. "Imagine skill reaching such heights!"

Cook Ting laid down his knife and replied, "What I care about is the Way, which goes beyond skill. When I first began cutting up oxen, all I could see was the ox itself. After three years I no longer saw the whole ox. And now I go at it by spirit and don't look with my eyes. Perception and understanding have come to a stop and spirit moves where it wants. I go along with the natural makeup, strike in the big hollows, guide the knife through the big openings, and follow things as they are. So I never touch the smallest ligament or tendon, much less a main joint."

"A good cook changes his knife once a year, because he cuts. A mediocre cook changes his knife once a month, because he hacks. I've had this knife of mine for nineteen years and I've cut up thousands of oxen with it, and yet the blade is as good as though it had just come from the grindstone. There are spaces between the joints, and the blade of the knife has really no thickness. If you insert what has no thickness into such spaces, then there's plenty of room, more than enough for the blade to play about it. That's why after nineteen years the blade of my knife is still as good as when it first came from the grindstone.

— Chapter 3 - The Secret of Caring for Life

The way in which Cook Ding is described cutting up the ox is both an example of the cognitive state of mind Zhuangzi associated with the Tao and the assertion that this state is accessible in everyday life.

== In popular culture ==
In 1990, a computer-generated image of Guo Xiang's head was used as the logo for the Russian television production company VID. In 2017, the old logo was heavily redesigned.

== See also ==
- Xiang Xiu
- Chan
- Chinese philosophy
- Laozi
- Zhuangzi (book)
- Xuanxue
