= Zhuangzi (book) =

Chinese Taoist text

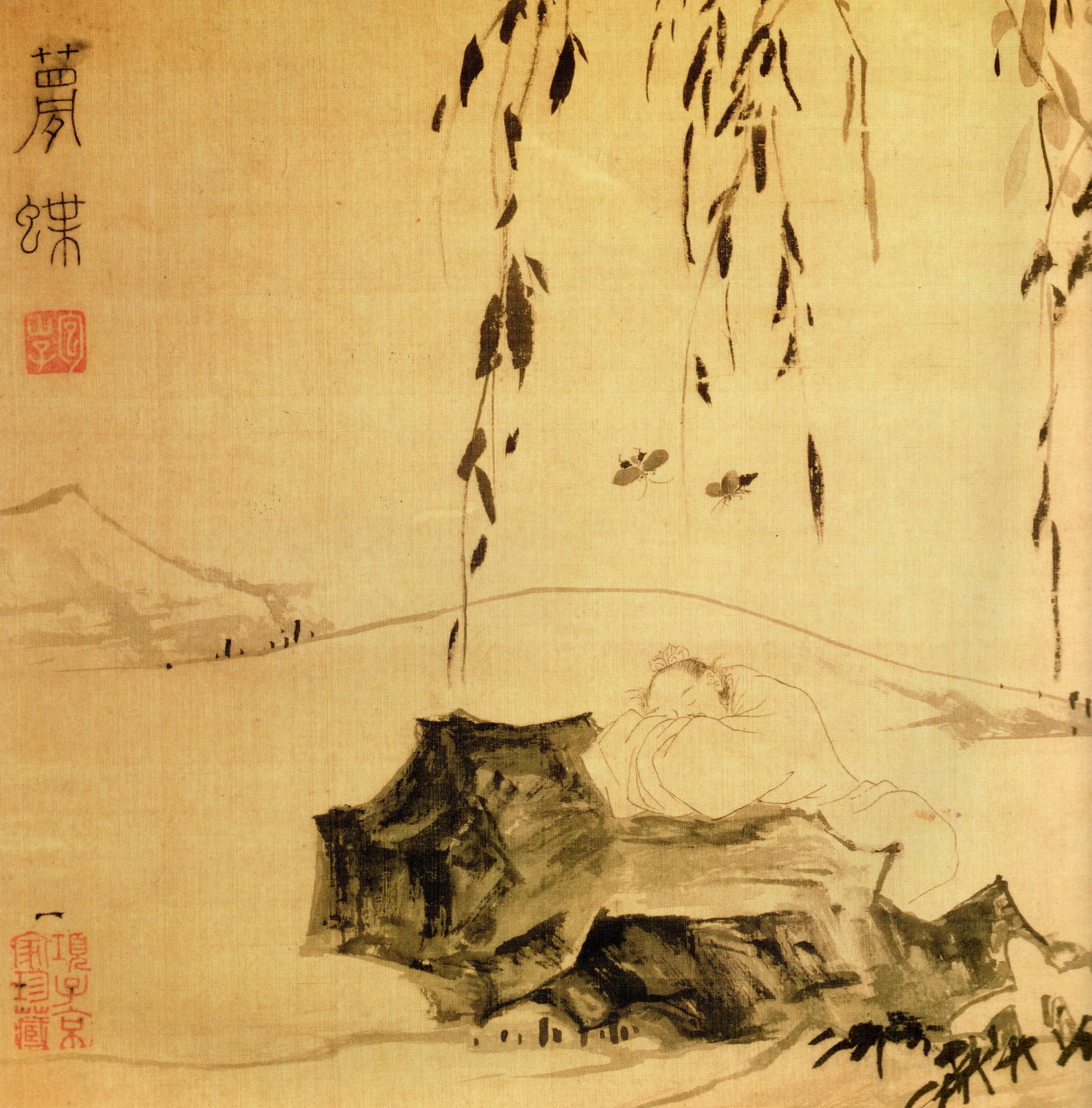
- The Butterfly Dream, by Chinese painter Lu Zhi (c. 1550)
- Author: (trad.) Zhuang Zhou
- Language: Classical Chinese
- Genre: Philosophy
- Publication place: China

Chinese name
- Traditional Chinese: 莊子
- Simplified Chinese: 庄子
- Literal meaning: "(The Writings of) Master Zhuang"
Transcriptions
Standard Mandarin
- Hanyu Pinyin: Zhuāngzǐ
- Bopomofo: ㄓㄨㄤ ㄗˇ
- Wade–Giles: Chuang^{1}-tzŭ^{3}
- Yale Romanization: Jwāngdž
- IPA: [ʈʂwáŋ.tsɹ̩̀]
Wu
- Suzhounese: Tsaon^{1}-tsy^{3}
Yue: Cantonese
- Yale Romanization: Jōngjí
- Jyutping: Zong1-zi2
- IPA: [tsɔŋ˥.tsi˧˥]
Southern Min
- Hokkien POJ: Chng-chú (col.); Chong-chú (lit.)
- Tâi-lô: Tsng-tsú (col.); Tsong-tsú (lit.)
Eastern Min
- Fuzhou BUC: Cŏng-cṳ̄
Middle Chinese
- Middle Chinese: [tʂjang-tzí]
Old Chinese
- Baxter (1992): *tsrjang-tsɨʔ
- Baxter–Sagart (2014): *[[ts]raŋ tsəʔ]

The Zhuangzi (historically romanized Chuang Tzŭ) is an ancient Chinese text that is one of the two foundational texts of Taoism, alongside the Tao Te Ching. It was written during the late Warring States period (476–221 BC) and is named for its traditional author, Zhuang Zhou, who is customarily known as "Zhuangzi" ("Master Zhuang").

The Zhuangzi consists of stories and maxims that exemplify the nature of the ideal Taoist sage. It recounts many anecdotes, allegories, parables, and fables, often expressed with irreverence or humor. Recurring themes include embracing spontaneity and achieving freedom from the human world and its conventions. The text aims to illustrate the arbitrariness and ultimate falsity of dichotomies normally embraced by human societies, such as those between good and bad, large and small, life and death, or human and nature. In contrast with the focus on good morals and personal duty expressed by many Chinese philosophers of the period, Zhuang Zhou promoted carefree wandering and following nature, through which one would ultimately become one with the "Way" (Tao).

Though appreciation for the work often focuses on its philosophy, the Zhuangzi is also regarded as one of the greatest works of literature in the Classical Chinese canon. It has significantly influenced major Chinese writers and poets across more than two millennia, with the first attested commentary on the work written during the Han dynasty (202 BC – 220 AD). It has been called "the most important pre-Qin text for the study of Chinese literature".

== History ==
=== Zhuang Zhou ===
The Zhuangzi is presented as the collected works of a man named Zhuang Zhou, traditionally referred to as "Zhuangzi" (莊子; "Master Zhuang"), using the ancient Chinese honorific -zi (子). Almost nothing is concretely known of Zhuang Zhou's life. Most of what is known comes from the Zhuangzi itself, which was subject to changes in later centuries. Most historians place his birth around 369 BC in a place called Meng (蒙) in the historical state of Song, near present-day Shangqiu, Henan. His death is variously placed at 301, 295, or 286 BC.

Sima Qian included a biography of Zhuang Zhou in the Han-era Shiji, saying that Zhuang Zhou is thought to have spent time in the southern state of Chu, as well as in the Qi capital of Linzi.(c. 91 BC). However, the biography seems to have been sourced mostly from the Zhuangzi itself. The American sinologist Burton Watson concluded: "Whoever Zhuang Zhou was, the writings attributed to him bear the stamp of a brilliant and original mind". University of Sydney lecturer Esther Klein observes: "In the perception of the vast majority of readers, whoever authored the core Zhuangzi text was Master Zhuang."

=== Textual history ===
The only version of the Zhuangzi known to exist in its entirety consists of 33 chapters originally prepared around AD 300 by the Jin-era scholar Guo Xiang (252–312), who reduced the text from an earlier form of 52 chapters. The first 7 of these, referred to as the 'inner chapters' (內篇; nèipiān), were considered even before Guo to have been wholly authored by Zhuang Zhou himself. This attribution has been traditionally accepted since, and is still assumed by many modern scholars. The original authorship of the remaining 26 chapters has been the subject of perennial debate: they were divided by Guo into 15 'outer chapters' (外篇; wàipiān) and 11 'miscellaneous chapters' (雜篇; zápiān).

Today, it is generally accepted that the outer and miscellaneous chapters were the result of a process of "accretion and redaction" in which later authors "[responded] to the scintillating brilliance" of the original inner chapters, although close intertextual analysis does not support the inner chapters comprising the earliest stratum. Multiple authorship over time was a typical feature of Warring States texts of this genre. A limited consensus has been established regarding five distinct "schools" of authorship, each responsible for their own layers of substance within the text. Despite the lack of traceable attribution, modern scholars generally accept that the surviving chapters were originally composed between the 4th and 2nd centuries BC.

Excepting textual analysis, details of the text's history prior to the Han dynasty (202 BC – 220 AD) are largely unknown. Traces of its influence on the philosophy of texts written during the late Warring States period, such as the Guanzi, Han Feizi and Huainanzi, suggest that the Zhuangzi's intellectual lineage had already been fairly influential in the states of Qi and Chu by the 3rd century BC. Sima Qian refers to the Zhuangzi as a 100,000-character work in the Shiji, and references several chapters present in the received text.

Many scholars consider a Zhuangzi composed of 52 chapters, as attested by the Book of Han in 111 AD, to have been the original form of the text. During the late 1st century BC, the entire Han imperial library—including its edition of the Zhuangzi—was subject to considerable redaction and standardization by the polymath Liu Xiang (77–6 BC) and his son Liu Xin (c. 46 BC – AD 23). All extant copies of the Zhuangzi ultimately derive from a version that was further edited and redacted to 33 chapters by Guo Xiang c. 300 AD, who worked from the material previously edited by Liu. Guo stated that he had made considerable edits to the outer and miscellaneous chapters in an attempt to preserve Zhuang Zhou's original ideas from later distortions, in a way that "did not hesitate to impose his personal understanding and philosophical preferences on the text". The received text as edited by Guo is approximately 63,000 characters long—around two-thirds the attested length of the Han-era manuscript. While none are known to exist in full, versions of the text unaffected by both the Guo and Liu revisions survived into the Tang dynasty (618–907), with the existing fragments hinting at the folkloric nature of the material removed by Guo.

=== Manuscripts ===
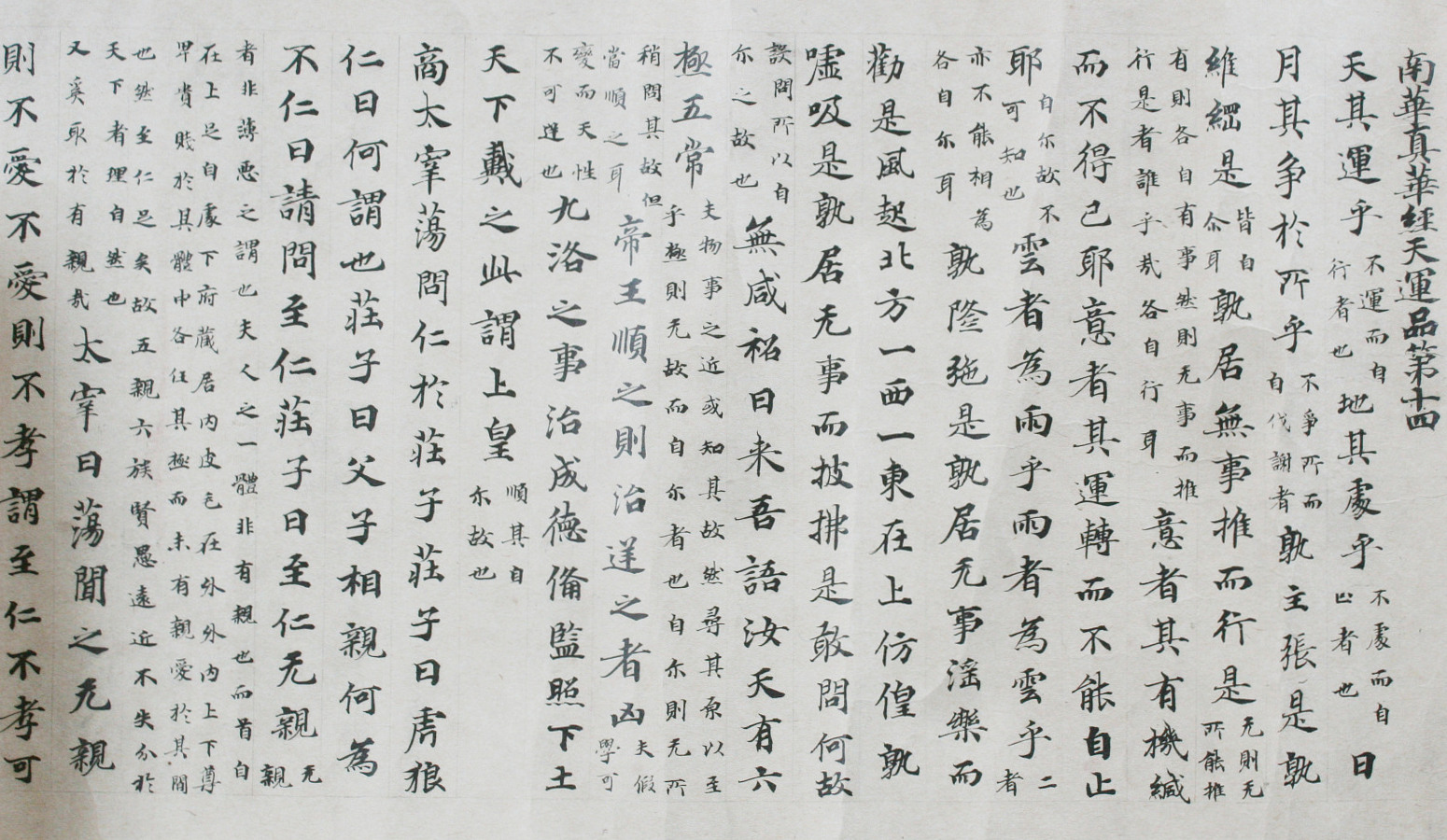
Replica of an 8th-century Tang dynasty manuscript of the "Heavenly Revolutions" chapter (No. 14), published in Tokyo in 1932

Portions of the Zhuangzi have been found among the bamboo slip texts discovered in tombs dating to the early Han dynasty, particularly at the Shuanggudui site near Fuyang in Anhui, and the Mount Zhangjia site near Jingzhou in Hubei. The earlier Guodian Chu Slips—unearthed near Jingmen, Hubei, and dating to the Warring States period c. 300 BC—contain what appears to be a short fragment parallel to the "Ransacking Coffers" chapter (No. 10 of 33).

The Dunhuang manuscripts—discovered in the early 20th century by Wang Yuanlu, then obtained and analyzed by the Hungarian-British explorer Aurel Stein and the French sinologist Paul Pelliot—contain numerous Zhuangzi fragments dating to the early Tang dynasty. Stein and Pelliot took most of the manuscripts back to Europe; they are presently held at the British Library and the Bibliothèque nationale de France. The Zhuangzi fragments among the manuscripts constitute approximately twelve chapters of Guo Xiang's edition.

A Zhuangzi manuscript dating to the Muromachi period (1338–1573) is preserved in the Kōzan-ji temple in Kyoto; it is considered one of Japan's national treasures. The manuscript has seven complete selections from the outer and miscellaneous chapters, and is believed to be a close copy of a 7th-century annotated edition written by the Chinese Taoist master Cheng Xuanying.

== Content ==
The Zhuangzi consists of anecdotes, allegories, parables, and fables that are often humorous or irreverent in nature. Most of these are fairly short and simple, such as the humans "Lickety" and "Split" drilling seven holes into the primordial "Wonton" (No. 7), or Zhuang Zhou being discovered sitting and drumming on a basin after his wife dies (No. 18). A few are longer and more complex, like the story of Lie Yukou and the magus, or the account of the Yellow Emperor's music (both No. 14). Most of the stories within the Zhuangzi seem to have been invented by Zhuang Zhou himself. This distinguishes the text from other works of the period, where anecdotes generally only appear as occasional interjections, and were usually drawn from existing proverbs or legends.

Some stories are completely whimsical, such as the strange description of evolution from "misty spray" through a series of substances and insects to horses and humans (No. 18), while a few other passages seem to be "sheer playful nonsense" which read like Lewis Carroll's "Jabberwocky". The Zhuangzi is full of quirky and fantastic character archetypes, such as "Mad Stammerer", "Fancypants Scholar", "Sir Plow", and a man who fancies that his left arm will turn into a rooster, his right arm will turn into a crossbow, and his buttocks will become cartwheels.

A master of language, Zhuang Zhou sometimes engages in logic and reasoning, but then turns it upside down or carries the arguments to absurdity to demonstrate the limitations of human knowledge and the rational world. Sinologist Victor H. Mair compares Zhuang Zhou's process of reasoning to Socratic dialogue—exemplified by the debate between Zhuang Zhou and fellow philosopher Huizi regarding the "joy of fish" (No. 17). Mair additionally characterizes Huizi's paradoxes near the end of the book as being "strikingly like those of Zeno of Elea".

=== Notable passages ===
==== "The Butterfly Dream" ====
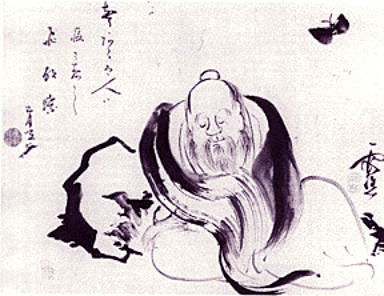
Zhuangzi Dreaming of a Butterfly, by 18th-century Japanese painter Ike no Taiga

The most famous of all Zhuangzi stories appears at the end of the second chapter, "On the Equality of Things", and consists of a dream being briefly recalled.

昔者莊周夢為胡蝶，栩栩然胡蝶也，自喻適志與。不知周也。
Once, Zhuang Zhou dreamed he was a butterfly, a butterfly flitting and fluttering about, happy with himself and doing as he pleased. He didn't know that he was Zhuang Zhou.

俄然覺，則蘧蘧然周也。不知周之夢為胡蝶與，胡蝶之夢為周與。周與胡蝶，則必有分矣。此之謂物化。
Suddenly he woke up and there he was, solid and unmistakable Zhuang Zhou. But he didn't know if he was Zhuang Zhou who had dreamt he was a butterfly, or a butterfly dreaming that he was Zhuang Zhou. Between Zhuang Zhou and the butterfly there must be some distinction! This is called the Transformation of Things.

— Zhuangzi, chapter 2 (Watson translation)

The image of Zhuang Zhou wondering if he was a man who dreamed of being a butterfly or a butterfly dreaming of being a man became so well known that whole dramas have been written on its theme. In the passage, Zhuang Zhou "[plays] with the theme of transformation", illustrating that "the distinction between waking and dreaming is another false dichotomy. If [one] distinguishes them, how can [one] tell if [one] is now dreaming or awake?"

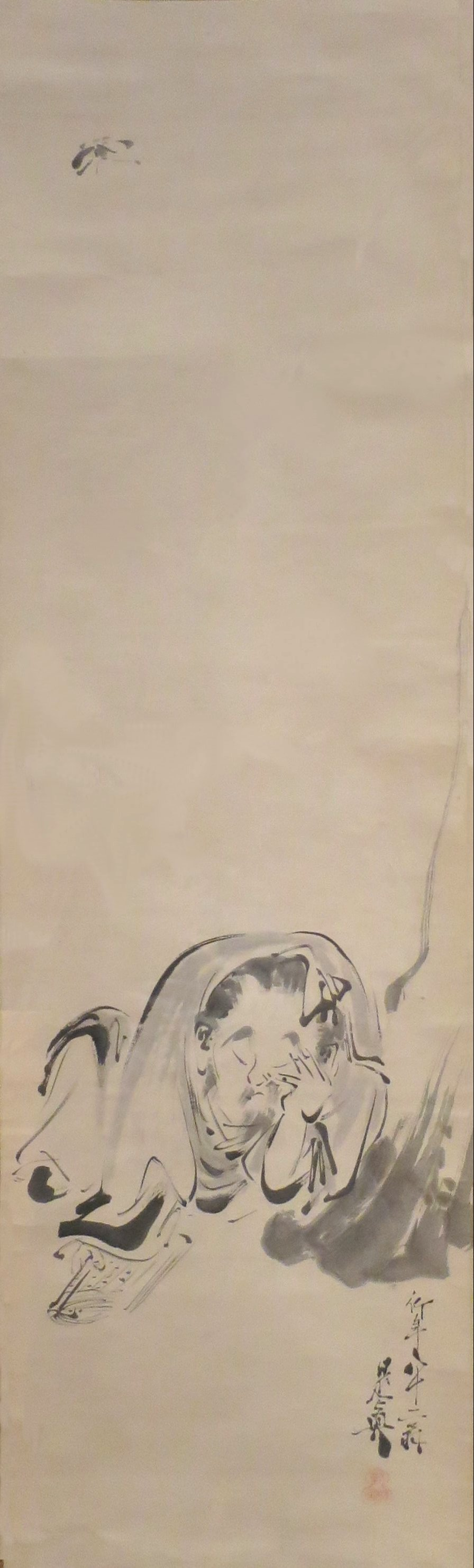
Zhuangzi Dreaming of a Butterfly, by Japanese painter Shibata Zeshin (1888)

==== "The Death of Wonton" ====
Another well-known passage dubbed "The Death of Wonton" illustrates the dangers Zhuang Zhou saw in going against the innate nature of things.

南海之帝為儵，北海之帝為忽，中央之帝為渾沌。儵與忽時相與遇於渾沌之地，渾沌待之甚善。儵與忽謀報渾沌之德，曰：人皆有七竅，以視聽食息，此獨無有，嘗試鑿之。日鑿一竅，七日而渾沌死。
The emperor of the Southern Seas was Lickety, the emperor of the Northern Sea was Split, and the emperor of the Centre was Wonton. Lickety and Split often met each other in the land of Wonton, and Wonton treated them very well. Wanting to repay Wonton's kindness, Lickety and Split said, "All people have seven holes for seeing, hearing, eating, and breathing. Wonton alone lacks them. Let's try boring some holes for him." So every day they bored one hole [in him], and on the seventh day Wonton died.

— Zhuangzi, chapter 7 (Mair translation)

Zhuang Zhou believed that the greatest of all human happiness could be achieved through a higher understanding of the nature of things, and that in order to develop oneself fully one needed to express one's innate ability.

==== "The Debate on the Joy of Fish" ====
Chapter 17 contains a well-known exchange between Zhuang Zhou and Huizi, featuring a heavy use of wordplay; it has been compared to a Socratic dialogue.

莊子與惠子遊於濠梁之上。莊子曰：儵魚出遊從容，是魚樂也。
Zhuangzi and Huizi were enjoying themselves on the bridge over the Hao River. Zhuangzi said, "The minnows are darting about free and easy! This is how fish are happy."

惠子曰：子非魚，安知魚之樂。莊子曰：子非我，安知我不知魚之樂。
Huizi replied, "You are not a fish. How (Note: In his translation, A. C. Graham notes Huizi's challenge as not using the broader Classical Chinese question word 何 ('how do you know?'), but rather a locative question word 安 ('whence do you know?'). These subtle differences in the original language give rise to a contemplation on perspective and the nature of knowing.) do you know that the fish are happy?" Zhuangzi said, "You are not I. How do you know that I do not know that the fish are happy?"

惠子曰：我非子，固不知子矣；子固非魚也，子之不知魚之樂全矣。
Huizi said, "I am not you, to be sure, so of course I don't know about you. But you obviously are not a fish; so the case is complete that you do not know that the fish are happy."

莊子曰：請循其本。子曰汝安知魚樂云者，既已知吾知之而問我，我知之濠上也。
Zhuangzi said, "Let's go back to the beginning of this. You said, How do you know that the fish are happy; but in asking me this, you already knew that I know it. I know it right here above the Hao."

— Zhuangzi, chapter 17 (Watson translation)

The precise point Zhuang Zhou intends to make in the debate is not entirely clear. The text appears to stress that "knowing" a thing is simply a state of mind: moreover, that it is not possible to determine whether "knowing" has any objective meaning. This sequence has been cited as an example of Zhuang Zhou's mastery of language, with reason subtly employed in order to make an anti-rationalist point.

==== "Drumming on a Tub and Singing" ====
A passage in chapter 18 describes Zhuang Zhou's reaction following the death of his wife, expressing a view of death as something not to be feared.

莊子妻死，惠子弔之，莊子則方箕踞鼓盆而歌。惠子曰：與人居長子，老身死，不哭亦足矣，又鼓盆而歌，不亦甚乎。
Zhuangzi's wife died. When Huizi went to convey his condolences, he found Zhuangzi sitting with his legs sprawled out, pounding on a tub and singing. "You lived with her, she brought up your children and grew old," said Huizi. "It should be enough simply not to weep at her death. But pounding on a tub and singing—this is going too far, isn't it?"

莊子曰：不然。是其始死也，我獨何能無概然。察其始而本無生，非徒無生也，而本無形，非徒無形也，而本無氣。雜乎芒芴之間，變而有氣，氣變而有形，形變而有生，今又變而之死，是相與為春秋冬夏四時行也。
Zhuangzi said, "You're wrong. When she first died, do you think I didn't grieve like anyone else? But I looked back to her beginning and the time before she was born. Not only the time before she was born, but the time before she had a body. Not only the time before she had a body, but the time before she had a spirit. In the midst of the jumble of wonder and mystery a change took place and she had a spirit. Another change and she had a body. Another change and she was born. Now there's been another change and she's dead. It's just like the progression of the four seasons, spring, summer, fall, winter."

人且偃然寢於巨室，而我噭噭然隨而哭之，自以為不通乎命，故止也。
"Now she's going to lie down peacefully in a vast room. If I were to follow after her bawling and sobbing, it would show that I don't understand anything about fate. So I stopped."

— Zhuangzi, chapter 18 (Watson translation)

Zhuang Zhou seems to have viewed death as a natural process of transformation to be wholly accepted, where a person gives up one form of existence and assumes another. The Zhuangzi contains no pessimism, nihilism, or indifference regarding life, death, and the self. All its stories about with death show quiet contentment and joy. In the second chapter, Zhuang Zhou makes the point that, for all humans know, death may in fact be better than life: "How do I know that loving life is not a delusion? How do I know that in hating death I am not like a man who, having left home in his youth, has forgotten the way back?" His writings teach that "the wise man or woman accepts death with equanimity and thereby achieves absolute happiness."

==== Zhuang Zhou's death ====
Zhuang Zhou's own death is depicted in chapter 32, pointing to the body of lore that grew up around him in the decades following his death. It serves to embody and reaffirm the ideas attributed to Zhuang Zhou throughout the previous chapters.

莊子將死，弟子欲厚葬之。莊子曰：吾以天地為棺槨，以日月為連璧，星辰為珠璣，萬物為齎送。吾葬具豈不備邪。何以加此。
When Master Zhuang was about to die, his disciples wanted to give him a lavish funeral. Master Zhuang said: "I take heaven and earth as my inner and outer coffins, the sun and moon as my pair of jade disks, the stars and constellations as my pearls and beads, the ten thousand things as my funerary gifts. With my burial complete, how is there anything left unprepared? What shall be added to it?"

弟子曰：吾恐烏鳶之食夫子也。莊子曰：在上為烏鳶食，在下為螻蟻食，奪彼與此，何其偏也。
The disciples said: "We are afraid that the crows and kites will eat you, Master!" Master Zhuang said: "Above ground I'd be eaten by crows and kites, below ground I'd be eaten by mole crickets and ants. You rob the one and give to the other—how skewed would that be?"

— Zhuangzi, chapter 32 (Kern translation)

=== List of chapters ===
	No.	Title	
	No.	English	Chinese
Inner chapters	1	"Carefree Wandering"	逍遙遊; Xiāoyáo yóu
Inner chapters	2	"On the Equality of Things"	齊物論; Qí wù lùn
Inner chapters	3	"Essentials for Nurturing Life"	養生主; Yǎngshēng zhǔ
Inner chapters	4	"The Human World"	人間世; Rénjiān shì
Inner chapters	5	"Symbols of Integrity Fulfilled"	德充符; Dé chōng fú
Inner chapters	6	"The Great Ancestral Teacher"	大宗師; Dà zōngshī
Inner chapters	7	"Responses for Emperors and Kings"	應帝王; Yìng dì wáng
Outer chapters	8	"Webbed Toes"	駢拇; Piān mǔ
Outer chapters	9	"Horses' Hooves"	馬蹄; Mǎtí
Outer chapters	10	"Ransacking Coffers"	胠篋; Qū qiè
Outer chapters	11	"Preserving and Accepting"	在宥; Zài yòu
Outer chapters	12	"Heaven and Earth"	天地; Tiāndì
Outer chapters	13	"The Way of Heaven"	天道; Tiān dào
Outer chapters	14	"Heavenly Revolutions"	天運; Tiān yùn
Outer chapters	15	"Ingrained Opinions"	刻意; Kè yì
Outer chapters	16	"Mending Nature"	繕性; Shàn xìng
Outer chapters	17	"Autumn Floods"	秋水; Qiū shuǐ
Outer chapters	18	"Ultimate Joy"	至樂; Zhì lè
Outer chapters	19	"Understanding Life"	達生; Dá shēng
Outer chapters	20	"The Mountain Tree"	山木; Shān mù
Outer chapters	21	"Sir Square Field"	田子方; Tiánzǐ fāng
Outer chapters	22	"Knowledge Wanders North"	知北遊; Zhī běi yóu
Misc. chapters	23	"Gengsang Chu"	庚桑楚; Gēngsāng Chǔ
Misc. chapters	24	"Ghostless Xu"	徐無鬼; Xú wúguǐ
Misc. chapters	25	"Sunny"	則陽; Zé yáng
Misc. chapters	26	"External Things"	外物; Wài wù
Misc. chapters	27	"Metaphors"	寓言; Yùyán
Misc. chapters	28	"Abdicating Kingship"	讓王; Ràng wáng
Misc. chapters	29	"Robber Footpad"	盜跖; Dào zhí
Misc. chapters	30	"Discoursing on Swords"	說劍; Shuō jiàn
Misc. chapters	31	"An Old Fisherman"	漁父; Yú fù
Misc. chapters	32	"Lie Yukou"	列禦寇; Liè Yùkòu
Misc. chapters	33	"All Under Heaven"	天下; Tiānxià

== Themes ==
The principles and attitudes expressed in the Zhuangzi form the core of philosophical Taoism. The text recommends embracing a natural spontaneity in order to better align one's inner self with the cosmic "Way". It also encourages keeping a distance from politics and social obligations, accepting death as a natural transformation, and appreciating things otherwise viewed as useless or lacking purpose. The text implores the reader to reject societal norms and conventional reasoning. The other major philosophical schools in ancient China—including Confucianism, Legalism, and Mohism—all proposed concrete social, political, and ethical reforms. By reforming both individuals and society as a whole, thinkers from these schools sought to alleviate human suffering, and ultimately solve the world's problems. Contrarily, Zhuang Zhou believed the key to true happiness was to free oneself from worldly impingements through a principle of 'inaction' (wu wei)—action that is not based in purposeful striving or motivated by potential gain. As such, he fundamentally opposed systems that sought to impose order on individuals.

The Zhuangzi describes the universe as being in a constant state of spontaneous change, which is not driven by any conscious God or force of will. It argues that humans, owing to their exceptional cognitive ability, tend to create artificial distinctions that remove them from the natural spontaneity of the universe. These include those of good versus bad, large versus small, and usefulness versus uselessness. It proposes that humans can achieve ultimate happiness by rejecting these distinctions, and living spontaneously in kind. Zhuang Zhou often uses examples of craftsmen and artisans to illustrate the mindlessness and spontaneity he felt should characterize human action. As Burton Watson described, "the skilled woodcarver, the skilled butcher, the skilled swimmer does not ponder or ratiocinate on the course of action he should take; his skill has become so much a part of him that he merely acts instinctively and spontaneously and, without knowing why, achieves success". The term "wandering" (遊; yóu) is used throughout the Zhuangzi to describe how an enlightened person "wanders through all of creation, enjoying its delights without ever becoming attached to any one part of it". The nonhuman characters throughout the text are often identified as being useful vehicles for metaphor. However, some recent scholarship has characterized the Zhuangzi as being "anti-anthropocentric" or even "animalistic" in the significance it ascribes to nonhuman characters. When viewed through this lens, the Zhuangzi questions humanity's central place in the world, or even rejects the distinction between the human and natural worlds altogether.

Political positions in the Zhuangzi generally pertain to what governments should not do, rather than what they should do or how they may be reformed. The text seems to oppose formal government, viewing it as fundamentally problematic due to "the opposition between man and nature". Zhuang Zhou attempts to illustrate that "as soon as government intervenes in natural affairs, it destroys all possibility of genuine happiness". It is unclear whether Zhuang Zhou's positions amount to a form of anarchism.

Western scholars have noted strong anti-rationalist themes present throughout the Zhuangzi. Whereas reason and logic as understood in Ancient Greek philosophy proved foundational to the entire Western tradition, Chinese philosophers often preferred to rely on moral persuasion and intuition. Throughout Chinese history, the Zhuangzi significantly informed skepticism towards rationalism. In the text, Zhuang Zhou frequently turns logical arguments upside-down in order to satirize and discredit them. However, according to Mair he does not abandon language and reason altogether, but "only wishe[s] to point out that over-dependence on them could limit the flexibility of thought". Confucius himself is a recurring character in the text—sometimes engaging in invented debates with Laozi, where Confucius is consistently portrayed as being the less authoritative, junior figure of the two. In some appearances, Confucius is subjected to mockery and made "the butt of many jokes", while in others he is treated with unambiguous respect, intermittently serving as the "mouthpiece" for Zhuang Zhou's ideas.

=== Comparison with the Tao Te Ching ===
The Zhuangzi and Tao Te Ching are considered to be the two fundamental texts in the Taoist tradition. It is accepted that some version of the Tao Te Ching influenced the composition of the Zhuangzi; however, the two works are distinct in their perspectives on the Tao itself. The Zhuangzi uses the word "Tao" (道) less frequently than the Tao Te Ching, with the former often using 'heaven' (天) in places the latter would use "Tao". While Zhuang Zhou discusses the personal process of following the Tao at length, compared to Laozi he articulates little about the nature of the Tao itself. The Zhuangzi's only direct description of the Tao is contained in "The Great Ancestral Teacher" (No. 6), in a passage "demonstrably adapted" from chapter 21 of the Tao Te Ching. The inner chapters and the Tao Te Ching agree that limitations inherent to human language preclude any sufficient description of the Tao. Meanwhile, imperfect descriptions are ubiquitous throughout both texts.

In the book, Zhuang Zhou also expresses his criticisms of the Tao Te Ching by abandoning Laozi's pragmatism, criticizing his rigid distinction between opposites, and appearing to destroy the doctrine that asserts the beginning of the world as "nonbeing":

有始也者，有未始有始也者，有未始有夫未始有始也者；有有也者，有无也者，有未始有无也者，有未始有夫未始有无也者。俄而有无矣，而未知有无之果孰有孰无也。 There is a beginning. There is a not yet beginning to be a beginning. There is a not yet beginning to be a not yet beginning to be a beginning. There is being. There is nonbeing. There is a not yet beginning to be nonbeing. There is a not yet beginning to be a not yet beginning to be nonbeing. Suddenly there is being and nonbeing. But between this being and nonbeing, I do not really know which is being and which is nonbeing.

== Influence ==
Of the texts written in China prior to its unification under the Qin dynasty in 221 BC, the Zhuangzi may have been the most influential on later literary works. For the period, it demonstrated an unparalleled creativity in its use of language. Virtually every major Chinese writer or poet in history, from Sima Xiangru and Sima Qian during the Han dynasty, Ruan Ji and Tao Yuanming during the Six Dynasties, Li Bai during the Tang dynasty, to Su Shi and Lu You in the Song dynasty were "deeply imbued with the ideas and artistry of the Zhuangzi".

=== Antiquity ===
Traces of the Zhuangzi's influence in late Warring States period philosophical texts such as the Guanzi, Han Feizi, and Lüshi Chunqiu suggest that Zhuang Zhou's intellectual lineage was already influential by the 3rd century BC. During the Qin and Han dynasties, with their respective state-sponsored Legalist and Confucian ideologies, the Zhuangzi does not seem to have been highly regarded. One exception is "Fu on the Owl" (鵩鳥賦; Fúniǎo fù)—the earliest known definitive example of fu rhapsody, written by the Han-era scholar Jia Yi in 170 BC. Jia does not reference the Zhuangzi by name, but cites it for one-sixth of the poem.

The Six Dynasties period (AD 220–589) that followed the collapse of the Han saw Confucianism temporarily surpassed by a resurgence of interest in Taoism and old divination texts such as the I Ching, with many poets, artists, and calligraphers of this period drawing influence from the Zhuangzi. The poets Ruan Ji and Xi Kang—both members of the Seven Sages of the Bamboo Grove—admired the work; an essay authored by Ruan entitled "Discourse on Summing Up the Zhuangzi" (達莊論; Dá Zhuāng lùn) is still extant.

==== Taoism and Buddhism ====
The Zhuangzi has been called "the most important of all the Daoist writings", with the inner chapters embodying the core ideas of philosophical Taoism. During the 4th century AD, the Zhuangzi became a major source of imagery and terminology for the Shangqing School, a new form of Taoism that had become popular among the aristocracy of the Jin dynasty (266–420). Shangqing School Taoism borrowed numerous terms from the Zhuangzi, such as "perfected man" (真人; zhēnrén), "Great Clarity" (太清; Tài Qīng), and "fasting the mind" (心齋; xīn zhāi). While their use of these terms was distinct from that found in the Zhuangzi itself, their incidence still demonstrates the text's influence on Shangqing thought.

The Zhuangzi was very influential in the adaptation of Buddhism to Chinese culture after Buddhism was first brought to China from India in the 1st century AD. Zhi Dun, China's first aristocratic Buddhist monk, wrote a prominent commentary to the Zhuangzi in the mid-4th century. The Zhuangzi also played a significant role in the formation of Chan Buddhism—and therefore of Zen in Japan—which grew out of "a fusion of Buddhist ideology and ancient Daoist thought." Traits of Chan practice traceable to the Zhuangzi include a distrust of language and logic, an insistence that the "Way" can be found in everything, even dung and urine, and a fondness for dialogues based on koans.

=== Medieval and modern eras ===
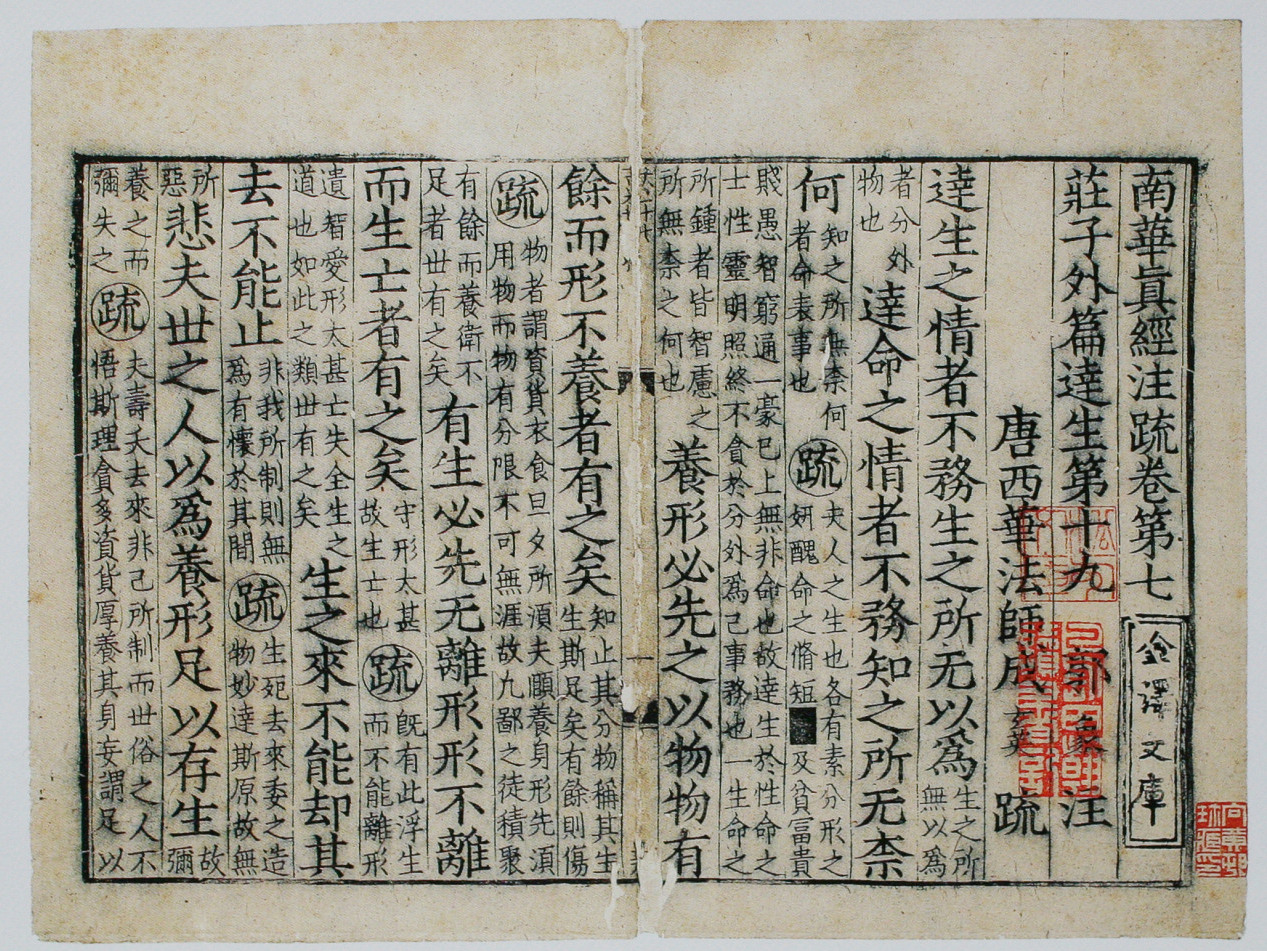
Opening pages of the "Understanding Life" chapter from a 13th-century printed edition

In 742, an imperial proclamation from Emperor Xuanzong of Tang (r. 712–756) canonized the Zhuangzi as one of the Chinese classics, awarding it the honorific title 'True Scripture of Southern Florescence' (南華真經; Nánhuá zhēnjīng). Nevertheless, most scholars throughout Chinese history did not consider it as being a "classic" per se, due to its non-Confucian nature.

Throughout Chinese history, the Zhuangzi remained the pre-eminent expression of core Taoist ideals. The 17th-century scholar Gu Yanwu lamented the flippant use of the Zhuangzi on the imperial examination essays as representing a decline in traditional morals at the end of the Ming dynasty (1368–1644). Jia Baoyu, the main protagonist of the classic 18th-century novel Dream of the Red Chamber, often turns to the Zhuangzi for comfort amid the strife in his personal and romantic relationships. The story of Zhuang Zhou drumming on a tub and singing after the death of his wife inspired an entire tradition of folk music in the central Chinese provinces of Hubei and Hunan called "funeral drumming" (喪鼓; sànggǔ) that survived into the 18th and 19th centuries.

=== 20th and 21st centuries ===
Cover of an edition of the Zhuangzi from the early 20th century

Outside of East Asia, the Zhuangzi is not as popular as the Tao Te Ching and is rarely known by non-scholars. A number of prominent scholars have attempted to bring the Zhuangzi to wider attention among Western readers. In 1939, the British sinologist Arthur Waley described it as "one of the most entertaining as well as one of the profoundest books in the world". In the introduction to his 1994 translation, Victor H. Mair wrote that he "[felt] a sense of injustice that the Dao De Jing is so well known to my fellow citizens while the Zhuangzi is so thoroughly ignored, because I firmly believe that the latter is in every respect a superior work."

Western thinkers who have been influenced by the text include Martin Heidegger, who became deeply interested in the oeuvres of Laozi and Zhuang Zhou during the 1930s. In particular, Heidegger was drawn to the Zhuangzi's treatment of usefulness versus uselessness. He explicitly references one of the debates between Zhuang Zhou and Huizi (No. 24) within the third dialogue of Country Path Conversations, written as the Second World War was coming to an end. In the dialogue, Heidegger's characters conclude that "pure waiting" as expressed in the Zhuangzi—that is, waiting for nothing—is the only viable mindset for the German people in the wake of the failure of national socialism and Germany's comprehensive defeat.

== See also ==
- Glossary of Zhuangzi exegesis

== Selected translations ==
- Herbert Giles (1889), Chuang Tzŭ: Mystic, Moralist and Social Reformer, London: Bernard Quaritch; 2nd edition, revised (1926), Shanghai: Kelly and Walsh; reprinted (1961), London: George Allen and Unwin.
- James Legge (1891), The Texts of Taoism, in Sacred Books of the East, vols. XXXIX, XL, Oxford: Oxford University Press.
- Fung Yu-lan (1933), Chuang Tzu, a New Selected Translation with an Exposition on the Philosophy of Kuo Hsiang, Shanghai: Shangwu.
- Burton Watson (1964), Chuang tzu: Basic Writings, New York: Columbia University Press; 2nd edition (1996); 3rd edition (2003) converted to pinyin.
- Burton Watson (1968), The Complete Works of Chuang Tzu, New York: Columbia University Press.
- A. C. Graham (1981), Chuang-tzu, The Seven Inner Chapters and Other Writings from the Book Chuang-tzu, London: George Allen and Unwin. Translation notes published separately in 1982 as Chuang-tzu: Textual Notes to a Partial Translation, London: School of Oriental and African Studies.
- Victor H. Mair (1994), Wandering on the Way: Early Taoist Tales and Parables of Chuang Tzu, New York: Bantam; republished (1997), Honolulu: University of Hawaiʻi Press.
- Brook Ziporyn (2009), Zhuangzi: The Essential Writings with Selections from Traditional Commentaries, Indianapolis: Hackett.
- Brook Ziporyn (2020), Zhuangzi: The Complete Writings, Indianapolis: Hackett.
- Richard John Lynn (2022), Zhuangzi: A New Translation of the Daoist Classic as Interpreted by Guo Xiang, New York: Columbia University Press.
- Christoph Harbsmeier & John R. Williams (2024), The Inner Chapters of the Zhuangzi: With Copious Annotations from the Chinese Commentaries, Wiesbaden: Harrassowitz Verlag.
- Chris Fraser (2025), The Complete Writings, Oxford: Oxford University Press.
