= Huangdi Sijing =

Chinese manuscripts

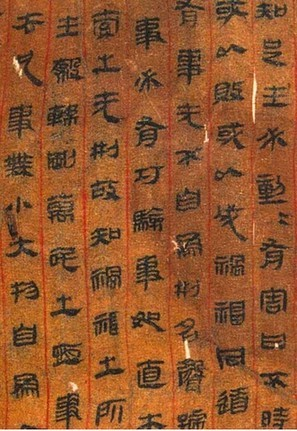
Part of the Yellow Emperor's Four Classics from the discovered Silk Texts

The Huangdi Sijing (simplified Chinese: 黄帝四经; traditional Chinese: 黃帝四經; pinyin: Huángdì sìjīng; lit. "Yellow Emperor's Four Classics") are ancient Chinese texts thought to be long-lost, manuscripts of which however are generally thought to have been discovered among the Mawangdui Silk Texts in 1973. Also known as the Huang-Lao boshu (simplified Chinese: 黄老帛书; traditional Chinese: 黃老帛書; pinyin: Huáng-Lǎo bóshū; lit. 'Huang-Lao Silk Texts'), or Huangdi shu 黄帝書 (Yellow Thearch Manuscripts), they are thought by modern scholars to reflect a lost branch of early syncretist Daoism, referred to as the "Huang–Lao school of thought" named after the legendary Huangdi (黃帝; "Yellow Emperor") and Laozi (老子; "Master Lao"). One finds in it "technical jargon" derived of Taoism, Legalism, Confucianism and Mohism.

== Translations ==
The first complete English translation of the Huangdi sijing was produced by Leo S. Chang (appended in Yu). Subsequent translations include scholarly versions by Yates, and by Chang and Feng, as well as some selected versions. Ryden provides an informative examination of "The Yellow Emperor's Four Canons".

A Complete Tao Te Ching with the Four Canons of the Yellow Emperor is translated by scholar Jean Levi (2011).

== Title ==
In the decades since 1973, scholars have published many Mawangdui manuscript studies. In 1974, the Chinese journal Wenwu (文物; "Cultural objects/relics") presented a preliminary transcription into modern characters. Tang Lan's influential article gave photocopies with transcriptions, analyzed the textual origins and contents, and cited paralleling passages from Chinese classic texts. Tang was first to identify these texts as the "Huangdi sijing", a no-longer extant text attributed to the Yellow Emperor, which the Hanshu's Yiwenzhi (藝文志) bibliographical section lists as a Daoist text in four pian (篇; "sections"). The "Huangdi sijing" was lost and is only known by name, and thus the Daoist Canon excluded it. While most scholars agree with Tang's evidence, some disagree and call the texts the Huang-Lao boshu or the Huangdi shu (黃帝書; "The Yellow Emperor's books").

== The four texts ==
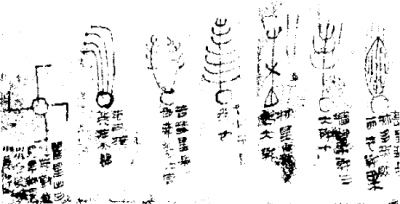
Part of the list of comet sightings from the Book of Silk (c. 400 BCE)

Mawangdui is an archeological site, comprising three Han-era tombs, found near Changsha in modern Hunan Province (ancient state of Chu). In December 1973, archeologists excavating "Tomb Number 3" (dated at 168 BCE) discovered an edifying trove of silk paintings and silk scrolls with manuscripts, charts, and maps.

These polymathic texts discussed philosophy, politics, medicine, Daoist neigong, Yin and Yang, and astronomy. Most were unknown in the received literature, ranging from a formulary that modern editors entitled Recipes for Fifty-Two Illnesses and two texts on cauterization – the Zubi Shiyi Mai Jiujing and Yin Yang Shiyi Mai Jiujing, both precursors of the Huangdi Neijing – to the unknown Book of Silk, which lists three centuries of comet sightings.

The Mawangdui manuscripts included two silk copies of the Daodejing, eponymously titled "Laozi". Both add other texts and both reverse the received chapter arrangement, giving the Dejing chapters before the Daojing. The so-called "B Version" included four previously unknown works, each appended with a title and number of characters (字):

1. Jing Fa (經法; "The Constancy of Laws"), 5000 characters
2. Shi Da jing (十大經; "The Ten Great Classics"), 4564
3. Cheng (稱; "Aphorisms"), 1600
4. Dao Yuan (道原; "On Dao the Fundamental"), 464
5. To note an additional work, Yates addends Jiu Zhu (The Nine Rulers), appended to the ‘A’ version of the Laozi

Due to textual lacunae, that is gaps in the written text due to the fragmentary preservation of the original ancient silk manuscripts, the original character counts are also uncertain.

The two longest texts are subdivided into sections. "The Constancy of Laws" has nine: 1. Dao fa (道法; "The Dao and the Law"), 2. Guo ci (國次; "The Priorities of the State"), 3. Jun zheng (君正; "The Ruler's Government").... "The Sixteen Classics", which some scholars read as Shi da jing (十大經; "The Ten Great Classics"), has fifteen [sic]: 1. Li ming (立命; "Establishing the Mandate"), 2. Guan (觀; "Observation"), 3. Wu zheng (五正; "The Five Norms")....

== Philosophical significance ==
The Huangdi sijing reveals some complex connections within Chinese philosophy. Take, for example, the first lines in "The Constancy of Laws":

The Way generates standards. Standards serve as marking cords to demarcate success and failure and are what clarify the crooked and the straight. Therefore, those who hold fast to the Way generate standards and do not to dare to violate them; having established standards, they do not dare to discard them. [Missing graph] Only after you are able to serve as your own marking cord, will you look at and know all-under-Heaven and not be deluded. (Dao fa, 1.1)

This passage echoes concepts from several rival philosophies, Daoism, Legalism, Mohism, Confucianism, and School of Names. De Bary and Lufrano describe Huangdi sijing philosophy as "a syncretism that is grounded in a cosmology of the Way and an ethos of self-cultivation".

"Prior to the Mawangdui discovery," says Peerenboom, "sinologists were more confused than clear about the school of thought known as Huang-Lao". Sima Qian's Records of the Grand Historian says many early Han thinkers and politicians favored Huang-Lao doctrines during the reigns (202-157 BCE) of Emperor Wen, Emperor Jing, and Empress Dou. Sima cites Han Fei, Shen Buhai, and Shen Dao as representative Huang-Lao philosophers, advocating that sagely rulers should use wu wei to organize their government and society. However, after Emperor Wu of Han (r. 141-87 BCE) declared Confucianism the official state philosophy, Huang-Lao followers dwindled and their texts largely vanished.

The Huangdi sijing texts provide newfound answers to questions about how Chinese philosophy originated. Carrozza explains that, "For a long time, the focal point in the study of early Chinese thought has been the interpretation of a rather limited set of texts, each attributed to a 'Master' and to one of the so-called 'Hundred Schools'." For instance, tradition says Mozi founded Mohism and his students compiled the Mozi text. Conversely, Mawangdui textual syncretism reveals "the majority of the ancient texts" are not written by individual authors, "but rather collections of works of different origins."

== Comparable works ==
Apart from the fourth text, Yates considered the first essay of Jingfa ("The Canon: Law"), the first text, most prominently comparable with Laozi (Tao te Ching, later considered a Daoist classic)); the rest of Jingfa is "for the most part, tightly argued treatises" on "socioeconomic and political policy and philosophy".

Though noting similar principles to the late Warring States period Han Feizi, Leo S. Chang considered the Sijing most comparable with the late Warring States Guanzi, and Yates finds Guanzi quotations quantitatively dominant. The Guanzi would theoretically have been influential among late Warring States period nobles. Even the Nine Rulers text, attached to the other Laozi in the Mawangdui silk texts, is "very close in conception" to an essay in the Guanzi.

Yates numbers quotations, or at least similar wordings, at twenty seven for the Guanzi (or proto-Guanzi), eighteen from the Guoyu and Heguanzi, ten from the Tao te Ching. Other references include Wei Liaozi, Shen Buhai, Shen Dao, Xunzi, the Book of Rites, and the Book of Changes. The Mohist concept of universal love is mentioned once, an idea which can also be compared with Laozi.

Randall Peerenboom's earlier study considered the "technical jargon" of the Boshu (Sijing) most "redolent" of the Tao te Ching (Laozi), "Legalist" Han Feizi, Shen Dao, Shen Buhai, Guanzi, the Mohist Mozi, the Confucian text Xunzi, Yin Wenzi, parts of the "Daoistic" Huainanzi, the Qin's Lushi Chunqiu encyclopedia, and outer chapters of the (Daoist classic) Zhuangzi.

=== "Legalism" comparison ===
As Chang's early survey noted, dating the Sijing back from the early Han dynasty, into the earlier Warring States period, would be theoretically complicated if it came after not only the Guanzi, but also the late Han Feizi, which Chang supposed possible given similar principles. Arguably, the authors of the late Qin state's Lushi Chunqiu encyclopedia are a stronger candidate for having read the Han Feizi, or at least it's chapter 40, discussing Shen Dao's ideas on (Shi) power or circumstantial authority. Shen Dao is known for the subject outside of the Han Feizi, but at least both texts discuss it. The same cannot be said for the Sijing.

Yates considered there to be "very close correspondences" between the Han Feizi and Sijing, with some passages similar to his predecessors, Shen Buhai and Shen Dao. It does not however directly use or reference concepts prominently associated with them in the Han Feizi, namely Shi circumstantial authority for Shen Dao, or Shu administrative technique, as evolving from Shen Buhai. Yates considered their absence "remarkable", strongly questioning it as a primarily "Legalist" text, and rejecting it as post-Qin dynasty text. It does have some similar administrative ideas to Shen Buhai, but with a stronger metaphysical foundation.

"A Lord's Government" in the Jingfa "Canon:Law" of the silk manuscripts recommends not pardoning the death penalty, so that it can be compared more to the "Legalism" of Shang Yang, but is also influenced by Confucianism. It recommends using orders and commands to form people into five and ten man groups, which can be compared with Shang Yang's military grouping of the populace. The Sijing however recommends training the groups according to their competencies, getting rid of market prohibitions and relaxing market taxes, the latter which can be compared with later Confucians Mencius and Xun Kuang. But Yates considered it's economic arguments still simpler than the Xunzi.

According to Yuri Pines, Shang Yang's "simplistic emphasis on agriculture" and suppression of commerce, was "eventually abandoned by Qin policy makers". The Qin dynasty stele are still said to memorialize the two basic occupations. The "Lord's Government", Shang Yang, and Qin dynasty, can be compared in this sense. In the "The Lord's Government", more specifically, earlier recommendations emphasizing agriculture for males, and weaving for females, continue alongside later contemporary recommendations for opening the market and relaxing prohibitions, which are argued to help "the worthy" keep "what they have obtained." The "three prohibitions" continues to recommend not opposing agriculture, but also not to oppose "the people's bright intelligence."

While noting grouping people as Shang Yang's policy recommendation, Yate's older scholarship questioned whether Qin carried it out. The opposite can be argued. Even supposing the idea of grouping people comes from the military, it is a basic enough military idea to be questioned as exclusive to Shang Yang. With Shang Yang as the preserved extreme example, it can be generalized to early Warring States mobilization. Although Shang Yang is earlier known to Xun Kuang as a renowned military leader, Yuri Pines affirms the Han Feizi as the first reference for writings associated with Shang Yang outside Qin.

== Format dating ==
The Sijing's compilational formatting is piecemeal, representing a type ranging the late pre-imperial period into the Han dynasty, whose formatting is influenced by Qin unification. Yates argued against late compilation of the present text as indicating Han works; although representative of Qin-Han formatting, its formatting is moreover not impossible to find in the late period outside Qin. Although questionable, it could have even been compiled as is before Qin unification.

But it does tend towards late formatting. The works could just as well have been compiled in the late Warring States period, and then updated to reflect chapter and title naming conventions of Han dynasty copyists. Yates regardless rejects the late copyists as the works original authors, favoring a pre-Qin dating for their original authorship (if not compilation).

== Dating ==
The Huang-Lao tradition is traditionally placed as more prominent from the late Warring States period to early Han dynasty. As Yates (1997) notes, dating for the Sijing had been disputed since its discovery. However, Yates "definitely" rejected it as a post-Qin work. Benjamin I. Schwartz (1998) considered scholarly efforts to relate and place the text within the context of pre-Qin thought to be "most convincing". Scholarship on the work "contributes to our understanding of the complexities of pre-Qin China."

Though the present text's formatting ranges the late Warring States to Han dynasty, the broader Sijing reflects work(s) earlier written in the Warring States period as a loose compilation, and were likely not originally of Han authorship if compilation. Yates and Michael Loewe (1999) placed the Sijing's Jingfa ("The Canon: Law") text in the late Warring States period before Qin unification. By way of linguistic comparison, Ryden considered the conclusion that Jingfa predates the Han dynasty "inescapable."

Its largest work, Jingfa may well be its latest work, drawing on a late linguistic environment comparable to the Lushi Chunqiu, with antecedents in the late Warring States Guanzi, but, given generalist legal terminology, also the Shangjunshu as ranging back earlier. With a comparable introduction and size to the Tao te Ching, it may well have been compiled independently to accompany it before becoming the Sijing's preface.

The small "Aphorisms" text is also styled similarly to the late Guanzi, with similar concepts of government. The second book syncretizes Guanzi and Zhuangzi content. One parable can be found in Chapter 23 of the Zhuangzi, which includes content predating the late Han Feizi. The fourth smaller text, Dao Yuan (Dao the Origin), resembling the Tao te Ching, has received little dating commentary. It can be dated to before unification, since it advocates unification. German Sinologists Dieter Kuhn and Helga Stahl place it in the third century bce without comment.

=== Early range arguments ===
Although Yates compares the Jingfa's language to the late Warring States Lushi Chunqiu, he argues (or notes) that it is not impossible to date the Jingfa's language farther back than the late period. He preferred to argue for the possibility of an earlier dating range in its case, and more generally. Although Yates doesn't reference Xun Kuang to argue earlier dating, he moreover considered Jingfa's economic arguments less complex than Xun Kuang. They can go back to at least Mencius.

Organization of the work aside, though Randall Peerenboom's early survey did yet not pin the Sijing down to the Warring states period, it ranged the work's Yin-Yang content back to the late Warring States period. Even dating parts of the Sijing to the late Lushi Chunqiu's period, such content need not post-date the Lushi Chunqiu, let alone the Heguanzi as ranging into the Han dynasty. The Lushi Chunqiu contains Yin-Yang subject phrases that the Sijing doesn't.

Traditional Chinese Huang-Lao type dating arguments (for an early Daoistic current influencing later content) would hold that the Sijing could have content deriving from as far back as the early fourth century bce, if similar content influenced Shen Dao, though as stated by Peerenboom likely not ranging back as far as the Spring and Autumn period. If the compilation itself went back to the Spring and Autumn period, the Confucians would likely have found a way to incorporate it in the Confucian canon, as they did with other early texts, the Classic of Poetry and the Book of Documents.

== Dating theory ==
Though Randall Peerenboom (1993) was open to a variety of dating theories, Yates and (at least one of Pereenboom's surveyed theories) both disagreed with the late (early Han dynasty) datings of earlier scholarship inasmuch as the work does not reference the Qin dynasty, making A.C. Graham's (1989) suggestion of placing the work during the Qin's fall unlikely.

The texts do not display the outlook of the Heguanzi, some of which has been suggested to have been compiled during Qin's fall. The second text of the work admits an allowance of uniting the world by force, which would seem a less likely commentary if it had already been united. The Sijing's Yin-Yang theories appear to predate the Qin dynasty.

While not a direct statement about the Sijing's political content, Mark Edward Lewis (2024) believes that texts on self cultivation from the Mawangdui silk texts likely only went into broad circulation among the elites a couple generations after the late Warring States Han Feizi. While a comparatively quick circulation, such content may earlier have belonged only to a small elite. But this chronology does still range elite content back to an earlier period.

Some earlier datings besides Graham include Cheng Chung-ying (1983) and Tang. Cheng merely suggested they were written in the early Han dynasty 179-169 BCE, shortly before they were entombed. Despite his support for a Warring States Huang-Lao current, Tang also suggested they were written in the early Han, supposing the work to reflect a conflict between Legalism and Confucianism. Placing it after the Heguanzi, Graham actually dated the work farther back when he placed it between the fall of the Qin and Han, which the Heguanzi was supposed to have been written in.

=== Peerenboom dating (continued) ===
Loewe's dating aside, dating for the Sijing/Boshu's content can only theorized. Entombed in the Han dynasty, it could have been compiled then. It would likely have been popular in the early Han, with arguments for moderacy, non-interventionism, and low taxes, so that such content could have been written in the early Han. But if some of the work did come from the Han, most if not all of it was more likely compiled and transmitted from the late Warring States period, with syncretic content ranging farther back. If it was compiled in the Han, it bares more resemblance to the early Han, likely predating Dong Zhongshu. Dong Zhongshu was more focused on human control of natural processes than the Sijing.

The use of chapter titles would suggest a compilation at least as late as the late Warring States period, as earlier texts did not do this. The late Warring States Xunzi and Han Feizi were the first other texts to use chapter titles. The Sijing also makes no discussion of the Qin dynasty, making it more likely to have been transmitted to the early Han dynasty than if it were written during or after the Qin. Some of its politics might have been at variance with Qin, but the author(s) would have no reason to avoid discussing the Qin after it had fallen. The early Han Huainanzi does include some discussion of the Qin dynasty.

=== Chang dating commentary ===
Chang follows an admitted tradition of simply assuming Tao te Ching (Laozi) influence, even though it does not quote the work. Yates does consider ten examples comparable to the Laozi, embracing the idea of its influence. As Yates notes, with some wording similar or identical wording to the Laozi, older scholarship generally argued that the work quotes extensively from it, and therefore has a later dating. Some also argued that the work's early references or quotations prove "they were composed early and that they exerted strong influence on competing philosophies in late Warring States time." A main argument that the Sijing compilation itself was not early, from Wu Guang (1985), was that the Guoyu's compilation (which influences the Sijing) is completed in the late Warring States period.

If the work is influenced by the Tao te Ching, it is theoretically simple to place an increase in Tao te Ching influence before the Han dynasty later in the Warring States period, where it can be directly seen in the Han Feizi. However, a lack of direct Tao te Ching quotation makes it even easier to theorize works as earlier, because of a lack of early reference. Even if they were contemporary, the Tao te Ching may not yet have attained a strength in influence to exert direct quotation. The introduction of the Jingfa prominently resembles the Tao te Ching, but the Sijing is dominated by references from or similar to the Guanzi.

The Tao te Ching itself includes universal cultural notions that were already common outside the work by the Warring States period. The introduction and length of the Jingfa does suggest it may have been compiled specifically to addend the Tao te Ching, whose length is the same. The prominence of similar ideas at minimum suggests something like the Tao te Ching had earlier been coming into prominence. It just does not mean that all of the Sijing's content came from a period after the Tao te Ching, or is prominently influenced it, which is not apparent. Chinese tradition also assumes Shen Buhai is influenced by the Tao te Ching. Reversing their traditional chronology, Herrlee Creel speculated that Shen Buhai preceded or even influenced the Tao te Ching. Shen Buhai is just a less likely candidate than Shen Dao, who is referenced by the Zhuangzi.

== Chang Daoist survey ==
Though Leo S. Chang does not consider basic terms like "Daoism," "Legalism" or "Huang-Lao" suitable for the Sijing, a traditional view would prefer the Sijing be an early Huang-Lao text (Yellow Emperor and Laozi), or at least include representative early content, according with Sima Qian's view that a Huang-Lao current (as including Laozi) influenced figures like Shen Buhai, Shen Dao and the late Warring States Han Feizi, which does quote the Tao te Ching. The Sijing could have currents that go that far back, if it has content that predates and influences Shen Dao. It is difficult to date compilation of the Sijing itself that far back, because it bears the hallmarks of a complex, late text.

Reversing Sima Qian's tradition in favor of Zhuangzi evidences, it can even be theorized Shen Dao (or his environment) instead influences compilation of the Tao te Ching. Representative of earlier content in dialectical theory, Shen Dao shares some content with the Zhuangzi and Sijing, with similar content to Laozi (Tao te Ching). Following the tradition of Laozi as a Spring and Autumn period thinker, Chang "assumes that the Laozi antedated the Four Texts", explores, and theorizes potential Laozi influences for the Sijing, with some passages similar to the Zhuangzi.

Another Chinese scholar Wu Guang was of the opinion the Sijing heavily draws on the Tao te Ching. Admittedly, it is characterized by late Warring States syncretism that could help mask this influence. But the Sijing does not actually quote Laozi. As Chang notes, there are moreover "no lengthy parallel expressions between" the Sijing and Tao te Ching. While this does not count out currents named for Laozi, as including Shen Dao, Chang admits the Sijing arguably bares more resemblance to the Guanzi. Chang considered there to be "many obvious parallels" between them, down to parallel expressions at the textual level.

The Sijing has similar ideas to Laozi of strategically "assuming feminine conduct", but the ruler switches to an active posture at "the right moment", countervailing against Laozi's passivity. In Laozi, the Dao gives birth to the One; in the Sijing, they are the same. Laozi disparages law; the Sijing's law 'derives from Dao'.

Though potentially preceding the Daodejing, if Sima Qian was familiar with the Sijing, he might additionally have considered it Huang-Lao Daoistic given its emphasis on Xing-Ming, or forms and names. The Han Feizi discusses Laozi and Xing-Ming together. Analyzing Yin Yang to ensure reliable results, the Sijing similarly matches "names" and "realities" as a practical way to appoint, monitor, and assess ministers.
