= Han Fei =

Chinese philosopher and statesman (280–233 BC)

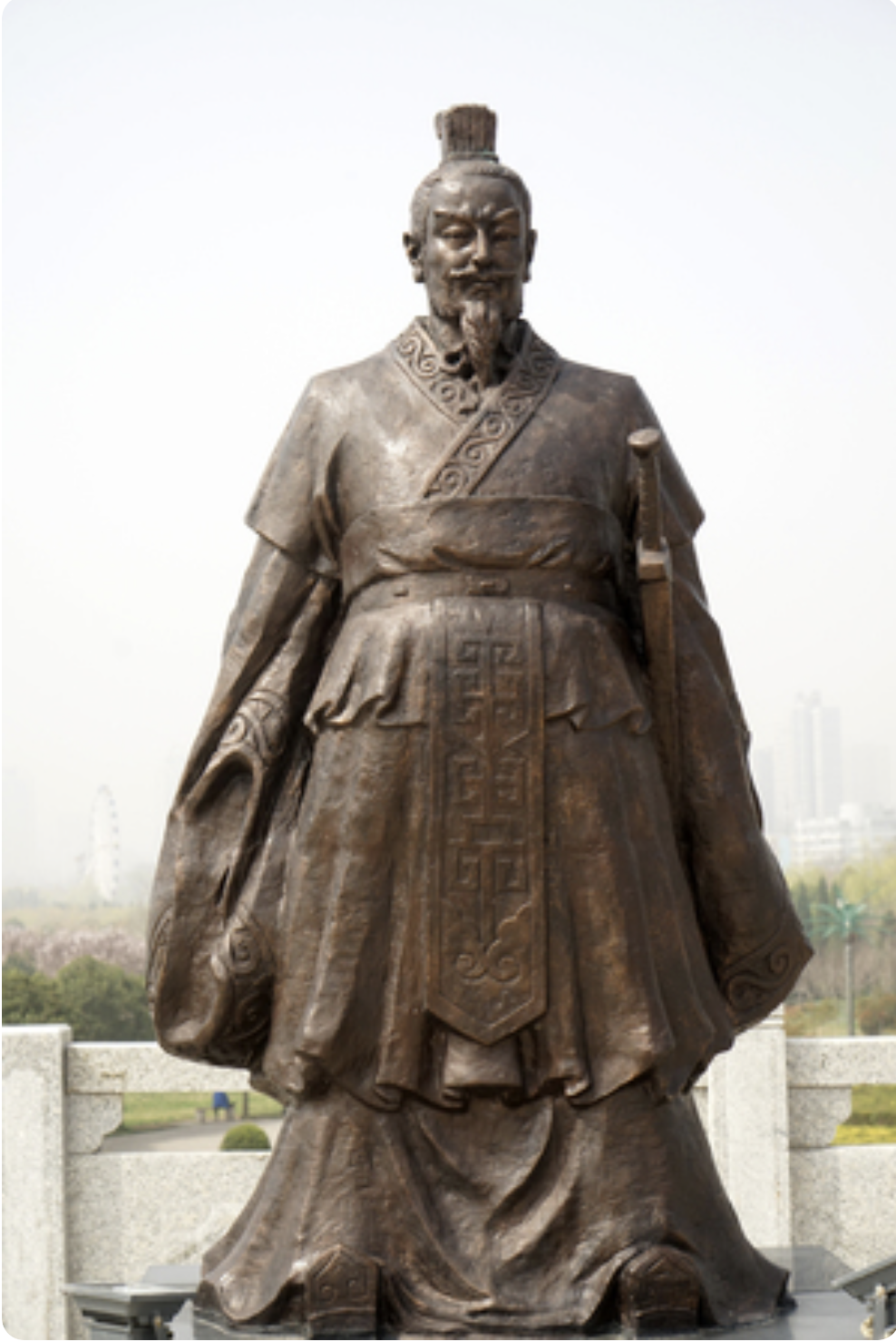
- Statue of Han Fei in Shaanxi Province, China
- Born: c. 280 BC; State of Han
- Died: 233 BC; State of Qin
- Cause of death: Suicide by drinking poison

Philosophical work
- Era: Ancient philosophy
- Region: Chinese philosophy
- School: Legalism
- Main interests: Fa; Xingming; Wu wei; Dao; Diplomacy
- Notable works: Han Feizi

Chinese name
- Traditional Chinese: 韓非
- Simplified Chinese: 韩非
Transcriptions
Standard Mandarin
- Hanyu Pinyin: Hán Fēi
- Bopomofo: ㄏㄢˊ ㄈㄟ
- Gwoyeu Romatzyh: Harn Fei
- Wade–Giles: Han^{2} Fei^{1}
- IPA: [xǎn féɪ]
Yue: Cantonese
- Yale Romanization: Hòhn Fēi
- Jyutping: Hon4 Fei1
- IPA: [hɔn˩ fej˥]
Southern Min
- Tâi-lô: Hân Hui
Middle Chinese
- Middle Chinese: Han Pji
Old Chinese
- Baxter–Sagart (2014): *[g]ˤar pəj

Alternative Chinese name
- Traditional Chinese: 韓子
- Simplified Chinese: 韩子
- Literal meaning: Master Han
Transcriptions
Standard Mandarin
- Hanyu Pinyin: Hánzǐ
- Wade–Giles: Han^{2}-tzu^{3}

Second alternative Chinese name
- Traditional Chinese: 韓非子
- Simplified Chinese: 韩非子
- Literal meaning: Master Han Fei
Transcriptions
Standard Mandarin
- Hanyu Pinyin: Hán Fēizǐ
- Wade–Giles: Han^{2} Fei^{1}-tzu^{3}

Han Fei (c. 280 – 233 BC), also known as Han Feizi or Han Fei Tzu, was a Chinese Legalist philosopher and statesman during the Warring States period. He was an imperial clansman of the state of Han.

Han Fei is often considered the greatest representative of Legalism for the Han Feizi, a later anthology of writings traditionally attributed to him, which synthesized the methods of his predecessors. Han Fei's ideas are sometimes compared with those of Niccolò Machiavelli, author of The Prince. Zhuge Liang is said to have attached great importance to the Han Feizi.

After the early demise of the Qin dynasty, the Legalist school was officially vilified by the Han dynasty that succeeded it. Despite its outcast status throughout the history of imperial China, Han Fei's political theory and Legalist ideas continued to heavily influence every dynasty thereafter, and the Confucian ideal of rule without laws was never to be realized.

Han Fei borrowed Shang Yang's emphasis on laws, Shen Buhai's emphasis on administrative technique, and Shen Dao's ideas on authority and prophecy, emphasizing that the autocrat will be able to achieve firm control over the state with the mastering of his predecessors' methodologies: his position of 'power' (勢 shì), 'technique' (術 shù), and 'law' (fa). He stressed the importance of the concept of holding actual outcome accountable to speech (刑名 xingming), coupled with the "two handles" system of punishment and reward, as well as wu wei ('non-exertion').

== Names ==
Han Fei is also known respectfully as Hanzi ('Master Han') or as Han Feizi ('Master Han Fei'). In Wade–Giles transcription, his same name is written Han Tzu, Han-tzu, Han Fei Tzu, or Han Fei-tzu. The same name—sometimes as "Hanfeizi" or "Han-fei-tzu"—is used to denote the later anthology traditionally attributed to him.

== Han Feizi ==
As chancellors of neighboring states, doctrines associated with Shang Yang of the Qin state, and Shen Buhai of the Han state, would have intersected before imperial unification. Though Xun Kuang was familiar with Shang Yang as a military leader, the Han Feizi is the first preserved reference for writings associated with Shang Yang outside Qin, with the Book of Lord Shang possibly going into broad circulation alongside the Guanzi in the late Warring States period.

Geographically, it is plausible for there to have been someone like a real Han Fei. A scion of the Han state, a real Han Fei would have been well positioned to learn of Shang Yang and Shen Buhai, and then write at least part of the Han Feizi. Most notably chapter 43, which discusses the two figures together. It is also plausible to have been familiar with chapter 40's Shen Dao, who was better known in the Warring States period.

== Legitimacy ==
While early scholarship was not very open the idea there was a real Han Fei, modern scholarship has been more open to the idea. Sinologist Goldin (2013) was open to the idea that details of Han Fei's life were "probably not far from the truth"; that Han Fei was "descended from the ruling house of Hán", and seeking office in Qin, was "executed in 233 B.C.E., after being entrapped by Li Si".

Masayuki Sato (2013) doubted that all of Sima Qian's details of Han Fei's life are historically accurate, dramatically setting up Han Fei as a tragic figure with Li Si as a destined opponent.

Sima Qian recounts that Qin Shi Huang went to war with the state of Han to obtain an audience with Han Fei, but was ultimately convinced to imprison him, whereupon he committed suicide. In the Stratagems of the Warring States, Han Fei supposedly slanders Qin diplomat Yao Jia, and the Qin king orders Han Fei's execution after Yao Jia successfully defends himself.

== Life ==
The exact year of Han Fei's birth remains unknown, however, scholars have placed it at c. 280 BC.

Unlike the other famed philosophers of the time, Han Fei was a member of the ruling aristocracy, having been born into the ruling family of Han during the end phase of the Warring States period. In this context, his works have been interpreted by some scholars as being directed to his cousin, the King of Han. The Records of the Grand Historian say that Han Fei studied together with future Qin chancellor Li Si under the Confucian philosopher Xun Kuang. It is said that because of his stutter, Han Fei could not properly present his ideas in court, but Sima regards him as having been very intelligent. His advice otherwise being ignored, but observing the slow decline of his Han state, he developed "one of the most brilliant (writing) styles in ancient China."

Sima Qian's biography of Han Fei is as follows:

Han Fei was an imperial clansman of Han, in favor of the study of name/form and law/art, which Sima Qian dubiously espoused as taking root in the Huang-Lao philosophy. He was born a stutterer and was not able to dispute well, but he was good at writing papers. Together with his friend, Li Si, he served Xun Qing, and Si himself admitted that he was not as competent as Fei. Seeing Han was on the decline, he often remonstrated with the king of Han by submitting papers, but the king did not agree to employ him. At this, Han Fei was frustrated with the reality that, in governing a state, the king did not endeavor to refine and clarify the juridical system of the state, to control his subjects by taking over power, to enhance state property and defense, or to call and employ the wise by enhancing the state.

Rather, the king employed the corrupted and treacherous and put them in higher positions over the wise. He regarded the intellectuals as a disturbance to the law by employing their literature and thought that knights violate the prohibition of the state by using armed forces. While the state was in peace, the king liked to patronize the honored; while in need, he employed warriors with armor and helmet. So the cultivated men could not be employed and the men employed could not be cultivated. Severely distressed over the reality that men of high integrity and uprightness were not embraced by the subjects with immorality and corruption, he observed the changes in the gaining and losing of the past.

Therefore, he wrote several papers like "Solitary Indignation", "Five Vermin", "Inner and Outer Congeries of Sayings", "Collected Persuasions", and "Difficulties in the Way of Persuasion", which amount to one hundred thousand words. However, while Han Fei himself knew well of the difficulty of persuasion for his work on the difficulties in the way of persuasion was very comprehensive, he eventually met an untimely death in Qin. He could not escape the trap of words for himself.

His works ultimately ended up in the hands of King Ying Zheng of Qin, who commented, "If I can meet and make friends with this person [Han Fei], I may die without regrets." and invited Han Fei to the Qin court. Han Fei presented the essay "Preserving the Han" to ask the king not to attack his homeland, but Yao Gu and Li Si (his ex-friend and rival) used that essay to have Han Fei imprisoned on account of his likely loyalty to Han. Han Fei responded by writing another essay named "In the first time of meeting Qin king", hoping to use his writing talent to win the king's heart. Han Fei did win the king's heart, but not before Li Si forced him to commit suicide by drinking poison. The Qin king afterward regretted Han Fei's death.

== Summary of his legalism ==
Xunzi formed the hypothesis that human nature is evil and virtueless, therefore suggesting that human infants must be brought to their virtuous form through social-class-oriented Confucian moral education. Without such, Xunzi argued, man would act virtueless and be steered by his own human nature to commit immoral acts. Han Fei's education and life experience during the Warring States period, and in his own Han state, contributed his synthesis of a philosophy for the management of an amoral and interest-driven administration, to which morality seemed a loose and inefficient tool. Han agreed with his teacher's theory of "virtueless by birth", but as in previous Legalist philosophy, pragmatically proposed to steer people by their own interest-driven nature.

== Notes ==
1. Watson, Burton, Han Fei Tzu: Basic Writings. 1964, p. 2. The king in question is believed to be either King An of Han (238–230 BC) or his predecessor, King Huanhui (272–239 BC).

== Sources ==
- Chang, Leo S (1998). The Four Political Treatises of the Yellow Emperor: Original Mawangdui Texts with Complete English Translations and an Introduction. Society for Asian and Comparative Philosophy. Monograph No.15. University of Hawaiʻi Press.
- Creel, Herrlee Glessner (1982) [1970]. What Is Taoism?: And Other Studies in Chinese Cultural History. University of Chicago Press. ISBN 9780226120478. JSTOR 1397689. OCLC 1256745090 – via Google Books.
- Fraser, Chris (2011). Oxford Handbook of World Philosophy. Oxford University Press. ISBN 978-0-19-532899-8.
- Goldin, Paul R. (2005). After Confucius: Studies In Early Chinese Philosophy. University of Hawai'i Press. ISBN 978-0-8248-2842-4.
  - Goldin, Paul R. (2005a), "Insidious Syncretism in the Political Philosophy of Huainanzi", University of Hawai'i Press, pp. 90–111, doi:10.1515/9780824873998-008, ISBN 978-0-8248-7399-8
- Goldin, Paul R. (2012). Dao Companion to the Philosophy of Han Fei. Dao Companions to Chinese Philosophy. University of Pennsylvania: Springer. ISBN 978-0-19-760347-5.
  - Goldin, Paul R. (2013), Introduction: Han Fei and the Han Feizi. In: Dao Companion to the Philosophy of Han Fei (PDF), Springer, pp. 1–21, ISBN 978-9-400-74318-2 – via the University of Pennsylvania
- Pines, Yuri (2014). Birth of an Empire. University of California Press. ISBN 978-1-938169-07-6.
- Graham, A.C. (1989). Disputers of the Tao: Philosophical Argument in Ancient China. Open Court. ISBN 978-0-8126-9942-5.
- Hansen, Chad (1992). A Daoist Theory of Chinese Thought. Oxford: Oxford University Press. ISBN 978-0-19-535076-0.
- Loewe, Michael (1986) [1978]. The Cambridge History of China, Vol. 1: The Ch'in and Han Empires, 221 BC-AD 220. Cambridge: Cambridge University Press. ISBN 978-0-521-24327-8.
- Loewe, Michael (1993). Early Chinese Texts: A Bibliographical Guide. Berkeley: Society for the Study of Early China; Institute of East Asian Studies, University of California Berkeley. ISBN 1-55729-043-1.
- Pines, Yuri (2017b). The Book of Lord Shang: Apologetics of State Power in Early China. Abridged Edition. Columbia University Press. ISBN 978-0-231-55038-3.
- Pines, Yuri (2019). The Book of Lord Shang: Apologetics of State Power in Early China. Abridged Edition. Columbia University Press. ISBN 978-0-231-55038-3.
- Pines, Yuri (2024). Dao Companion to China's fa Tradition. Hebrew University of Jerusalem: Springer. ISBN 9789048129270.
  - Pines, Yuri (2024c), Chapter 4. Han Feizi: The World Driven by Self-Interest. In: Pines, Y. (eds) Dao Companion to China's fa Tradition (PDF), Dao Companions to Chinese Philosophy, Springer, Cham, pp. 99–138, doi:10.1007/978-3-031-53630-4_5, ISBN 9783031536298
  - Bai, Tongdong. "Chapter 23 The Han Feizi and Its Contemporary Relevance". In Pines (2024), pp. 645-676.
