= Heguanzi =

Ancient Chinese text

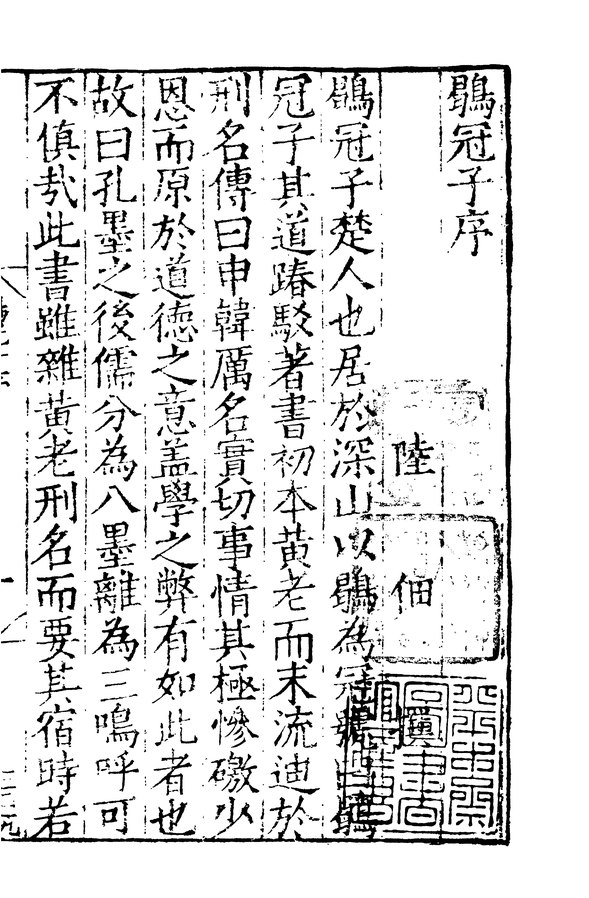
- First page of Heguanzi edition by Lu Dian (陸佃, 1042–1102), Ming facsimile of a Song print.

Chinese name
- Traditional Chinese: 鶡冠子
- Simplified Chinese: 鹖冠子
Transcriptions
Standard Mandarin
- Hanyu Pinyin: Héguānzǐ
- Wade–Giles: Ho-kuan-tzu
Yue: Cantonese
- Jyutping: Hot^{3}gun^{1}zi^{2}
Middle Chinese
- Middle Chinese: Hat kwan tsiX
Old Chinese
- Baxter–Sagart (2014): *Gˁat k.ʔˁon tsəʔ

Korean name
- Hangul: 갈관자
- Hanja: 鶡冠子
Transcriptions
- Revised Romanization: Galgwanja

Japanese name
- Kanji: 鶡冠子
- Hiragana: かつかんし
Transcriptions
- Revised Hepburn: Katsukanshi

The Heguanzi (Chinese: 鶡冠子; trans. "Master Pheasant Cap") is a circa 3rd century BCE syncretic collection of writings from the Chinese Hundred Schools of Thought, particularly the schools of Huang-Lao, Daoism, Legalism, and the Military. Assumed a forgery in later Imperial China, discovery of the 2nd-century BCE Han dynasty Mawangdui Silk Texts lead to renewed studies into its textual history and philosophical significance. The previously unknown Huang-Lao Silk Manuscripts have many passages similar and identical with the Heguanzi,

The 111 CE Book of Han history is the earliest extant source to mention the Heguanzi, yet the next reliable sources referring to it date from the early 6th century. In 805, the influential Tang dynasty writer Liu Zongyuan found a copy of the Heguanzi and disparaged it as a post-Han apocryphal forgery. His opinion was widely accepted by scholars for the next twelve centuries, during which the text was seldom read and infrequently mentioned.

== Dating ==
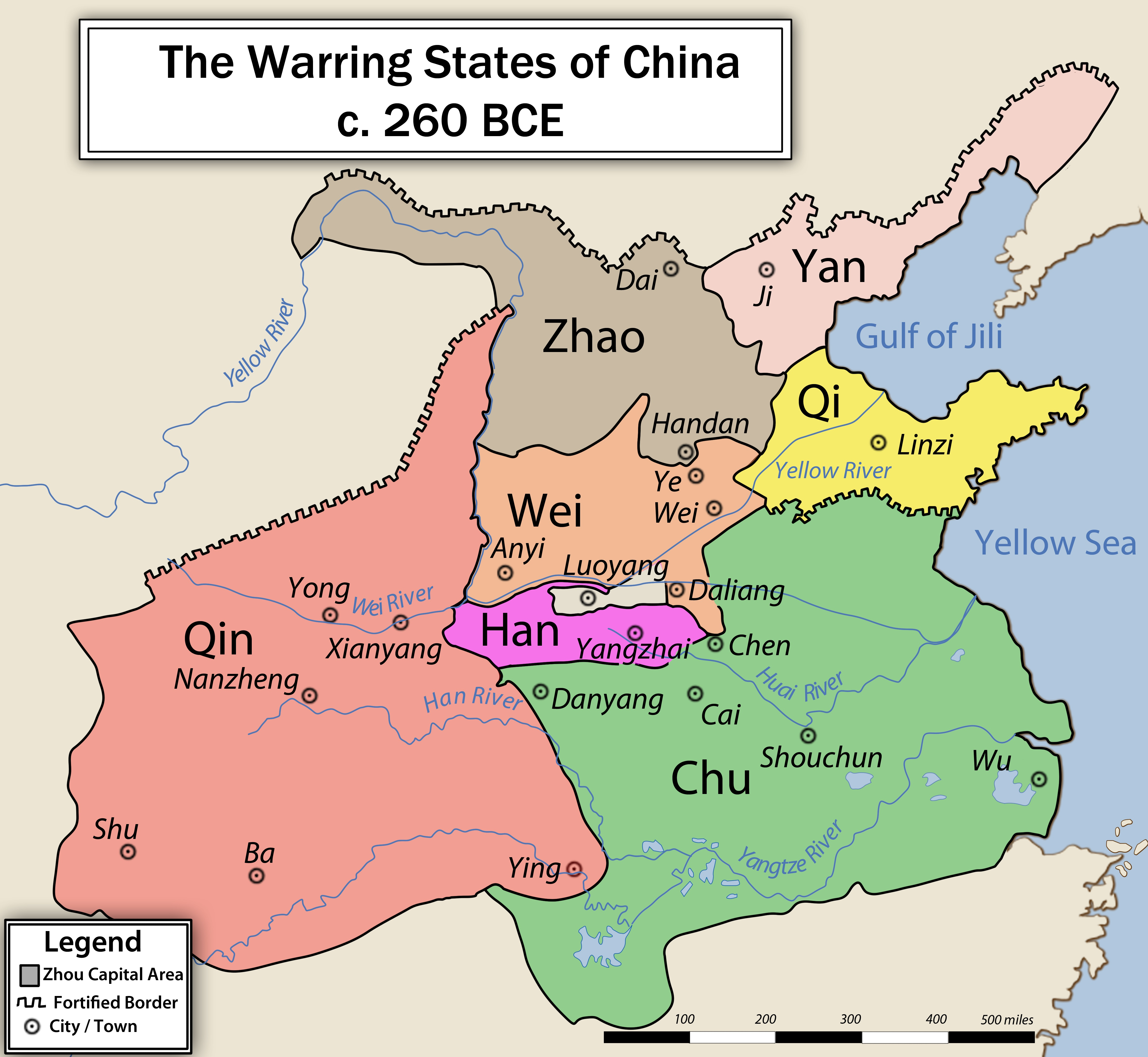
The Warring States

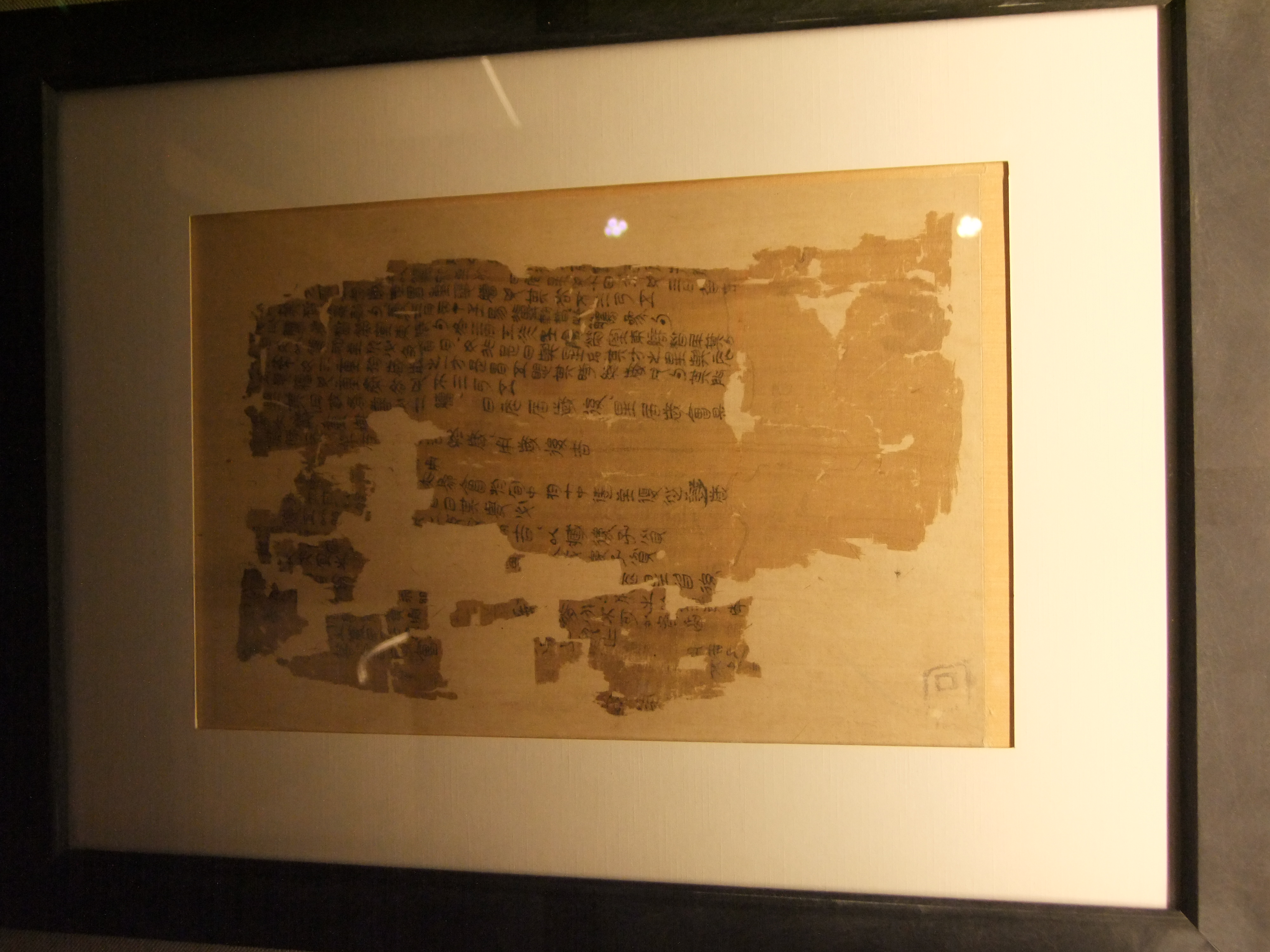
Silk manuscript of an untitled Yinyang and Wuxing text from Mawangdui Tomb No. 3

The emerging consensus is that, although the Heguanzi text may be a composite of the writings of multiple authors representing various schools of thought, much if not all of it belongs to the late Warring States (475–221 BCE) to Han (202 BCE-220 CE) periods.

Several Heguanzi chapters (esp. 1 and 2) follow the strict naming taboo on writing a Chinese emperor's given name. During the Qin dynasty (221–206 BCE), it was forbidden to write Qin Shi Huang's personal name zhēng (政; 'principal', 'governance') or the related word zhèng (正; "correct; proper; upright"), and duān (端; "correct; upright; erect") was substituted for both—demonstrating that the received version was at least partly redacted under Qin rule.

In December 1973, archaeologists working on the Mawangdui site, near Changsha, Hunan discovered a hoard of manuscripts written on silk scrolls in Mawangdui Tomb No. 3, which had been sealed up in 168 BCE. These now-famous "Mawangdui Silk Texts" included the earliest attested copies of Chinese classics such as the Yijing and two versions of the Daodejing, as well as previously unknown books on subjects including philosophy, astronomy, medicine, and military strategy.

The scroll with one of the Daodejing versions also included four manuscripts that strongly resembled the Heguanzi in thought and language. These were originally identified as the Huangdi Sijing (黃帝四經; "The Yellow Emperor's Four Classics"), a lost text that the Book of Han's Yiwenzhi section lists as a Daoist work in 4 pian, but most scholars now refer to them as the Huang-Lao boshu (黃老帛書; "Huang-Lao Silk Texts"). The Mawangdui silk manuscripts revealed that the forgotten Heguanzi, traditionally disregarded as a post-Han fake, was a vital key to understanding Huang-Lao thought within the Hundred Schools of pre-Qin philosophy.

== Textual history ==
Han dynasty scholars first recorded the Heguanzi two thousand years ago. The librarian Liu Xin's 8 BCE Qilüe (七略; "Seven Summaries") bibliography listed the Heguanzi twice, under both School of Daoism and School of the Military. When the historian Ban Gu incorporated the Qilüe into the Book of Han's 78 CE Yiwenzhi bibliographical catalog of the Imperial Library, he eliminated the Heguanzi entry under School of the Military, noting "listed among titles deleted from this section as duplicated elsewhere"; included it, in 1 pian (篇; "chapter"), under School of Daoism, and gave the earliest biographical information about Master Pheasant Cap, "A man of Chu, lived deep in the mountains, wore a pheasant cap." The Yiwenzhi also lists two copies of a text called Pang Xuan (龐煖), i.e., Master Pang who was Master Pheasant Cap's disciple in the Heguanzi, a 2 pian version under School of Diplomacy and 3 pian one under School of the Military.

While the Book of Han bibliographic catalog specifies that the Heguanzi book has 1 pian ("chapter"), later historical bibliographies (e.g., 636 Book of Sui, 945 Old Book of Tang, and 1060 New Book of Tang) list it as a work of 3 juan (卷; "scrolls"), like the received text. For this reason, some scholars have concluded that portions of the Heguanzi must have been forged after the Han dynasty. Instead of plagiarism or forgery, the sinologist David R. Knechtges proposes a simpler explanation for the discrepancy between 1 pian and 3 juan versions of the Heguanzi. It is possible that the text of 1 pian contained only the Daoist sections of the work, and that the Heguanzi which Ban Gu eliminated from the School of the Military category contained the sections concerned with military strategy, perhaps derived from the 2 and 3 pian Pang Xuan texts that Ban Gu added.

Subsequent to the 1st century CE Book of Han reference to the Heguanzi, there is a four-century gap until the next reliable sources. The lost Zichao (子鈔; "Epitome of Masters Texts") compilation by the Liang dynasty (502–557) scholar Yu Zhongrong (庾仲容) listed the Heguanzi (3 juan) in the table of contents. The Tang historian Wei Zheng's 631 Qunshu zhiyao (群書治要; "Important Matters of Governance from a Wide Variety of Books") political encyclopedia has extracts from chapters 1, 2 and 16, including the chapter titles. The Tang prose master Han Yu (768–824) quoted from Heguanzi chapters 1 and 15 with their titles.

Some early versions of the Master Pheasant Cap were arranged differently. Between the Tang (618–907) and Song (960–1279) dynasties, the number of chapters is given as 15, 16, or 19; but since the Ming dynasty (1368–1644), only 19-chapter editions have circulated. Han Yu saw a 16-chapter Heguanzi version with scribal errors and lacunae. Chao Gongwu (晁公武; d. 1171) extracted a 19-chapter version from a 32-chapter text that included Mozi interpolations and post-Han discursive essays. In the 1920s, Fu Cengxiang (傅潧湘; 1872–1950) obtained a Dunhuang manuscript with the first half of the Heguanzi and an anonymous commentary dated 629.

Five printed complete Heguanzi editions are all based on Lu Dian's commentary version: the 1445 Daozang (Daoist Canon); 1805 Xuejin taoyuan (學津討原), reprinted in the 1936 Sibu Beiyao (四部备要); 1935 Wuying dian zhuzhengban congshu (武英殿聚珍版叢書); 1577 Zihui (子彙), reprinted, with punctuation, in the 1937 Congshu jicheng (叢書集成); and the 1919–1922 Sibu congkan (四部叢刊) reprint of a Ming facsimile of a Song edition. The 1408 Yongle Encyclopedia quotes all of Heguanzi chapter 11, predating the 1445 Daozang first received edition.

== Author ==
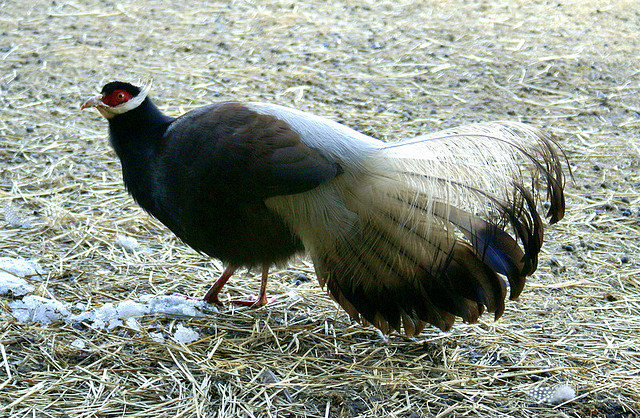
Brown eared pheasant.

Little is known about Master Pheasant Cap's anonymous author or compiler, or according to some, authors or compilers. Since its reevaluation after the 1973 Mawangdui discovery, a considerable part of Heguanzi scholarship has focused on the provenance and dates of the person Heguanzi, with the current consensus that he was from the southern state of Chu and lived circa the second half of the 3rd century BCE. Internal evidence from the Heguanzi confirms the early Han view that Master Pheasant Cap came from Chu, such as a chapter 9 list of official titles typically used in Chu, for example, lingyin (令尹) for "prime minister"; as well as linguistic parallels in terminology and rhyme found in other early texts associated with Chu (e.g., Songs of Chu). However, the Heguanzi predominantly mentions the northern state of Zhao. While Chinese classics typically refer to historical events, the Heguanzi (chap. 12) only mentions one datable event, Zhao general Pang Xuan's victory in 242 BCE.

The author's eponym héguān (鶡冠; "pheasant[-feather] cap") is a Classical Chinese trope for a warrior. The namesake Chinese pheasant hé (鶡) is identified as: "Brown-eared pheasant or Manchurian snow-pheasant (Crossoptilon mantchuricum), dark brown with white-tipped tailfeathers, the tailfeathers often being used as decoration for caps". Guan (冠) usually refers to a formal hat or headdress, e.g., wángguān (王冠; "royal crown").

The 5th century Book of the Later Han describes the heguan cap as a badge of military valor that was introduced by King Wuling of Zhao, whom Pang Xuan instructs in Heguanzi chapter 19, and who was famous for military reforms beginning in 307 BCE, notably replacing traditional Zhou dynasty warfare involving chariots and armored infantry with nomadic cavalry style "barbarian clothing and mounted archery" (胡服騎射; hufu qishe. In the Warring States period, the snow pheasant was considered a ferocious fighter and thus warriors symbolically wore its tailfeathers in their hats.

== Content ==
The received text of Heguanzi or Pheasant Cap Master comprises 19 piān (篇; "chapters; sections; tracts") organized in 3 juàn (卷; "scrolls; fascicles; volumes"), specifically, scroll 1 with chapters 1–7, 2 with 8–11, and scroll 3 with 12–19. This format was followed by the standard Heguanzi edition with the commentary of Song dynasty scholar and lexicographer Lu Dian (陸佃, 1042–1102). The chapters' length ranges from extremely short (135 characters in chapter 3) to rather long (2,404 in chapter 9).

Contents of the Heguanzi
Chapter (pian 篇)	Title	Translation
1	Boxuan (博選)	Wide Selection
2	Zhuxi (著希)	Manifest Hope
3	Yexing (夜行)	The Night Walker
4	Tianze (天則)	Heaven's Model
5	Hualiu (環流)	Circular Flow
6	Daoduan (道端)	The Way's Governance
7	Jinyi (近佚)	Impending Collapse
8	Duwan (度萬)	Fathoming Myriads
9	Wangfu (王鈇)	Royal Axe
10	Taihong (泰鴻)	Grand Galaxy
11	Tailu (泰錄)	Grand Record
12	Shibing (世兵)	Generations of Arms
13	Beizhi (備知)	Prepared Knowledge
14	Bingzheng (兵政)	Armed Campaigns
15	Xuewen (學問)	Study Problems
16	Shixian (世賢)	Generations of Worthies
17	Tianquan (天權)	Heaven's Authority
18	Nengtian (能天)	Enabling Heaven
19	Wulingwang (武靈王)	King Wuling

The Heguanzi text is usually differentiated between its seven dialog chapters and twelve essay chapters. Five of the dialog chapters (7–9 and 14–15) consist of discussions in which Heguanzi answers questions about war or government from his disciple Pangzi (龐子, Master Pang). Pangzi is generally identified as General Pang Xuan (龐煖; c. 295-c. 240 BCE) from the state of Zhao (403–222 BCE), who defeated Yan in 242 BCE and led the failed campaign of the six allied states against Qin in the next year. General or Master Pang is the common link between the above five dialog chapters that mention Heguanzi and the two remaining ones that do not; in chapter 16, Pang Xuan gives advice to King Daoxiang of Zhao (r. 244–236), and in chapter 19, Pang Huan (龐煥), who Lu Dian identifies as Pang Xuan, reading huan (煥; "shine; glow") as a scribal error for xuan (煖; "warm"), instructs King Wuling of Zhao (r. 325–299).

The twelve Heguanzi essay chapters also exhibit considerable variety. Chapters 1–6 share long passages with other early sources and have been studied in relation to them. Essays in chapters 10 and 11, "Supreme Flood" and "Supreme Indistinctness", are similar and may originally have constituted one chapter. The subsequent chapters 12 and 13 are also sometimes read together as promoting Daoist primitivism. Lastly, the enigmatic essay chapters 17 and 18, "Heaven's Authority" and "Enabling Heaven" are connected. Both are practically incomprehensible, perhaps due to "textual corruption or cryptic content", and set between two most problematic chapters 16 and 19 that do not mention the person Heguanzi.

The Heguanzi's mixed content exemplifies the School of Syncretism or School of Miscellany, in terms of Ban Gu's Yiwenzhi classification of the Hundred Schools of Thought. Master Pheasant Cap has passages from many intellectual sources, particularly from the Schools of Huang-Lao (i.e., Yellow Emperor and Laozi), Daoism, Yin-Yang, Five Agents, Legalism, Confucianism, Mohism, School of Diplomacy, and the Military. Moreover, textual comments and observations indicate the authors' expertise in Chinese astronomy, calendar and divination, meditation practices, and at least some knowledge of music, medicine, and various other technical matters.

== Themes ==
David R. Knechtges says a major theme of the Heguanzi is the Daoist idea that nature moves cyclically, and the need for the ruler to harmonize his thought and action with the workings of heaven, which by its continual movement establishes the norms (法; fa) for human society. The military chapters stress the importance of the ruler attracting the most able advisers (preferably those who were "one hundred times better than oneself") and following the principles of propriety, duty, loyalty, and fidelity.

The sinologist Carine Defoort discusses three central themes as the core of Heguanzi's contribution to early Chinese philosophy. First, political frustration seems to have first captured the attention of intellectuals in the Tang dynasty, with the image of a frustrated advisor becoming a rough hermit. At the end of his life, the great Tang poet, Du Fu (712–770), compared himself to Master Pheasant Cap when expressing his political despair and loneliness: "My whole life I've been a Heguanzi. I sigh about the world and wear deerskin". Second, veneration of the One (一; yi), which whether in politics, astronomy, or cosmology, is the axis around which everything revolves and' the inexhaustible source of energetic order. And third, the regularity and reliability of Heaven (天; tian), believed to be an entity that transcends humans, sends down mandates and calamities, and is an impressive model of cosmic order and dependability.

== Evaluations ==
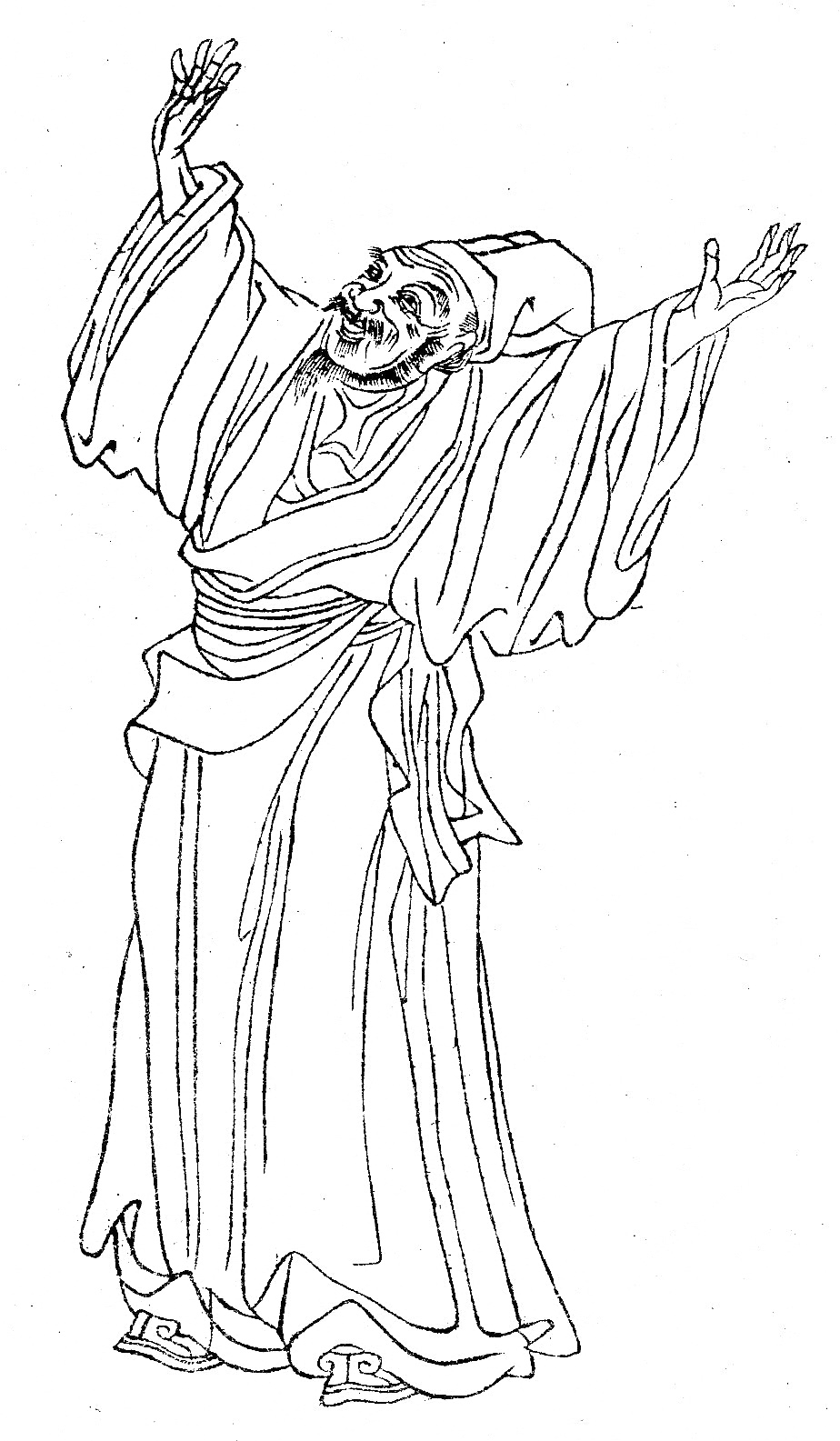
Liu Zongyuan.

Prior to the 1973 discovery of the Mawangdui silk manuscripts, most scholarly assessments of the Heguanzi were negative, commonly finding faults with format and content inconsistencies, suspected plagiarism, textual corruption, and conflation of sources.

The Tang scholar Liu Zongyuan (773–819) disparaged the Heguanzi as a forgery because chapter 12 has a passage, "Rhapsody of the Hero", virtually identical with the Han poet Jia Yi's famous c. 174 BCE "Owl Rhapsody" Liu's Bian Heguanzi (辯鶡冠子; "Disputing the Master Pheasant Cap ") says:

When I read Jia Yi's Owl Rhapsody I admired its verses. Yet scholars thought it was entirely taken from Heguanzi. In my comings and goings in the capital, I sought a copy of Heguanzi but did not find one. It was only when I arrived in Changsha that for the first time [805] I got ahold of this treatise. I read it. It consisted entirely of base and shallow statements. Only the bits (Jia) Yi had quoted were beautiful. Of the rest, nothing was acceptable. I think an amateur forged this treatise and he, instead, took the Owl Rhapsody to embellish it with literary style. It cannot be true that Yi took from it.

Based on the Heguanzi chapter 12 context of a treatise on military tactics, the Owl Rhapsody passage is "very likely" a later addition to the text. In addition to inserting Jia Yi's rhapsody, a previous part of chapter 12 is nearly identical with a 284 BCE letter that Lu Zhonglian (魯仲連; 305–245 BCE) submitted to the king of Yan, as recorded in the Zhanguoce (Strategies of Qi).

Even academics who were impressed or fascinated by the Heguanzi could not deny its obviously flawed text with missing and miswritten characters. The Tang poet and Confucian scholar, Han Yu (768–824) said that "after reading its expressions three times, I felt sorry that its characters were deficient and corrupt". In the description of the primary Heguanzi commentator Lu Dian, "Often, it seems like one who, scattered and confused, has no home. But its strange expressions and mysterious meanings are also numerous. ... The instances where the wording is deficient, corrupt, and impossible to check are many".

Han Yu remarked that Heguanzi "mixes [the ideas of] Huang-Lao and [Legalist] Forms-and-names" and Lu Dian's preface to the book says Heguangzi's "way is eclectic. The text he wrote is first rooted in Huang-Lao and branches out into Forms-and-names." So, proceeding from non-action, responsiveness, and reliance (hence "rooted in Huang-Lao") and applied to politics and administration (hence "branching out to Forms-and-names").

Joseph Needham, the historian of Chinese science and technology, became interested in the Heguanzi when researching ancient Chinese texts for concepts corresponding to "natural law" and juristic "laws of nature". He found some "strangely interesting passages" that use fa (法; "law; method; standard; model"), for instance, "Unity is the fa for all" and "The unitary fa having been established, all the myriad things conform to it".

Defoort concludes that despite the Heguanzi's inconsistent content, textual corruption, commentarial intrusions, and the likelihood of multiple authorship, there seems to be "one voice speaking" in the text, which "expresses a need for unification and stability, and a belief in the Heavenly power of the sage-ruler to bring this about".

== See also ==
- A feather in your cap
