= Shen Buhai =

Chinese philosopher and politician (c. 400–c. 337 BC)

- Chinese: 申不害
- Literal meaning: does not harm
Transcriptions
Standard Mandarin
- Hanyu Pinyin: Shēn Búhaì
- Wade–Giles: Shen Pu-hai
- IPA: [ʂə́n pûxâɪ]
Yue: Cantonese
- Yale Romanization: Sān Bāt-hoih
- Jyutping: San^{1} Bat^{1}-hoi^{6}
Southern Min
- Tâi-lô: Sin Put-hāi
Old Chinese
- Baxter–Sagart (2014): *l̥i[n] pə m-kˤat-s

Shen Buhai (Chinese: 申不害; c. 400 BC – c. 337 BC) was a Chinese statesman, reformer and diplomat. According to the Shiji, Shen Buhai served as Chancellor of the Han state under Marquis Zhao of Han, for around fifteen years to his natural death in office in 337 BC, ordering its government and doctrines emphasizing Shu 术 (administrative) technique, though the term is Han Fei's and likely posthumous.

According to Sima Qian, Shen Buhai was born in the central State of Zheng, serving as a minor official there. A contemporary of Shang Yang and syncretist Shi Jiao, after Han completed the conquest and division of Zheng and Wei in 376 BC, he rose up in the ranks of the Han officialdom, reforming its administrative practices, military defenses, and to a lesser extent issuing new laws, only about a half century after its founding.

While it is not evident Shen Buhai was earlier as well known as another of the Han Feizi's predecessors, Shen Dao, his administrative ideas were influential enough to become one of Xun Kuang's critiqued "Twelve Masters" by the later Warring States period, and might have been renowned by the time of the Han Feizi. Shen Buhai seemed to play an influence on Han dynasty reformers, and likely even the establishment of the civil service examination. With the imperial examination extending in influence to the European civil service, Shen Buhai could perhaps be considered a founder in world bureaucracy, and even the first political scientist.

Though differing from Daoism as later understood, Shen Buhai was said to be a Daoist in the Shiji, with Sima Qian attesting Shen Buhai, Shen Dao and Han Fei to be "rooted" in Huang-Lao, or "Yellow Emperor and Laozi (Daoism). The Han Feizi recalls him alongside the Tao te Ching; with concepts of wu wei "non-action", but a Dao or Way referring more to (administrative) methods (fa) of governance, he might have preceded it, but if so does bear a "striking" resemblance to it. Together they form an influence for the Daoistic Han dynasty Huainanzi.

Despite his later influence, though reforming the law, according to the Han Feizi, Shen Buhai had disorganized law in the early Han state. No Han or earlier text individually connects him with penal law, but only with control of bureaucracy. The Huainanzi and Hanshu only gloss him as a penal figure (or Legalist) when discussing him alongside Shang Yang. In contrast to Shang Yang, Shen Buhai appears to have opposed punishment, in hopes that a strict and efficient administration would abolish the need for it in the bureaucracy. As quoted by Pei Yin, Liu Xiang recalls him recommending the ruler "grasp (administrative) technique (shu)" in-order to "do away" with the punishment of subordinates, relying on supervision and accountability.

== Dating ==
Sima Qian likely had few details of Shen Buhai's life outside what could be gathered from the Han Feizi. His given name Buhai 不害 means "does not harm"; according to Liu Xiang, Shen Buhai's writings recommend the ruler "do away" with punishment, relying on supervisory technique (shu).

Only the questionable death date of Shen Buhai in 337 B.C. is correlated between multiple sources. He was supposed by Ch'ien Mu to have lived sixty or seventy years. The birth date of 400 B.C. is a compromise between 397 and 407 that was believed to be "safe" by German Sinologist Alfred Forke. Sinologist Tao Jiang still used 400 in his 2021 work, the "Origins of moral-political philosophy in early China." Sometimes the birth date is simply left out.

Although Shen Buhai is recorded in Sima Qian's Historical Records as becoming Chancellor in Marquis Chao's eight year, traditionally 351 BC, Ch'ien Mu and Herrlee Creel suggested it more probable to date Shen Buhai's appointment as Chancellor, and the Marquis eighth year, earlier, around 354/355 BC, after the state of Wei sieged the state of Chao. The Stratagems of the Warring States state that Shen Buhai had just found favor with the Marquis at the time of that event, making his time as chancellor a little over Sima Qian's fifteen years. Despite the comparatively minor disagreement, Shen Buhai's appointment is likely the most accurate dating that can be determined for his life in general.

Chinese scholar Tang Lan preferred to date Shen Buhai slightly older, at 405; Tang prefers to make him a contemporary follower of a presumed 400 b.c. Huang-Lao school along the lines of the Huangdi Sijing (which can be debated). With extant evidence not able to suggest Huang-Lao much earlier, Tang placed its emergence in the same time period, presumably preferring Shen Buhai be old enough for its influence to reach him and become acquainted with the new school.

== Speculative early influences ==
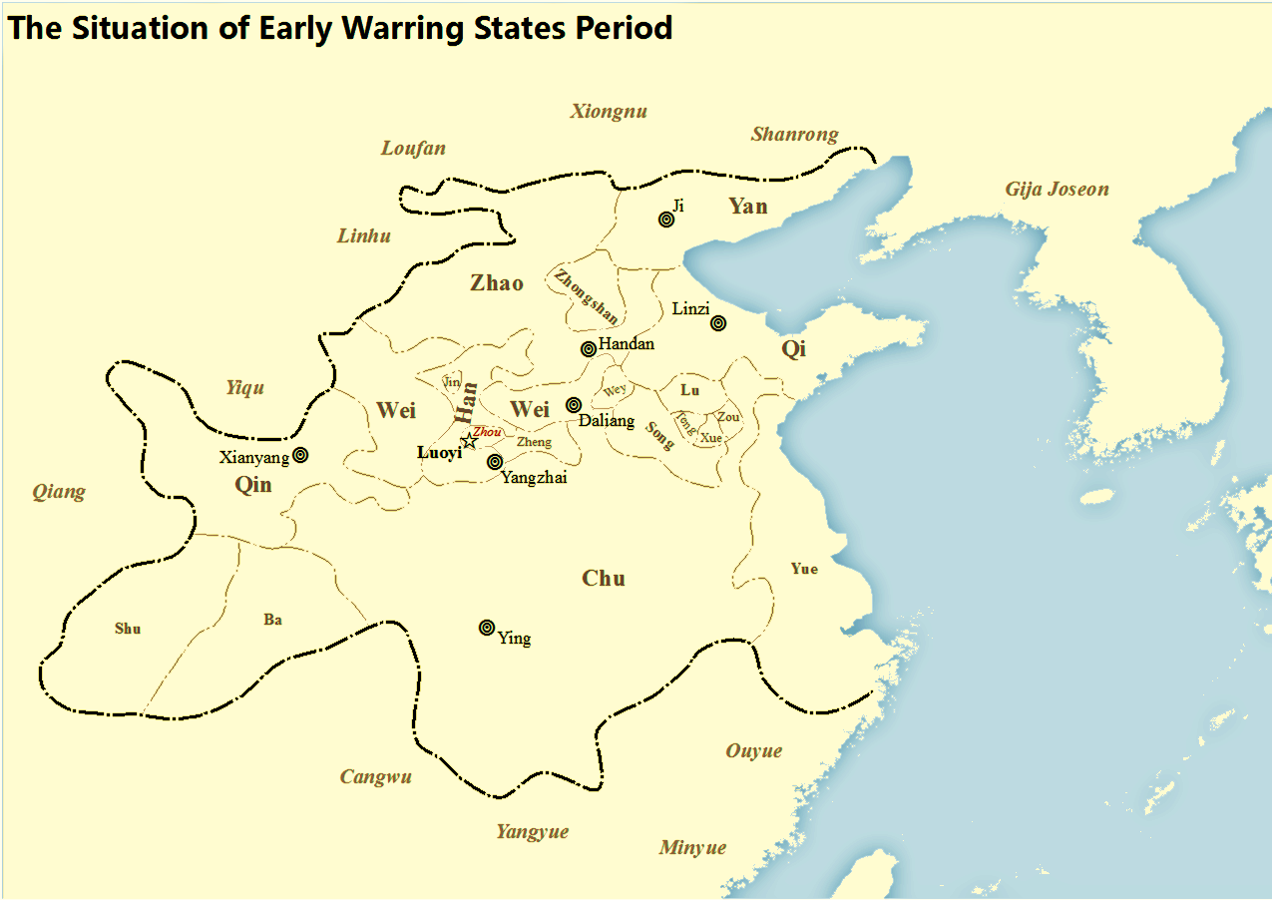
Early Warring States period

Creel argued that the traditions of Shen Buhai, or at least the Han state, might earlier have been influenced by the prominent Chu state to the south, which had its own heydey of reform, or older neighboring law reformers like the significantly influential Zichan. Creel takes Zichan as an older point of comparison for bureaucratic reform in the introduction of his 1974 opus, prior arguing that Shen Buhai's Confucian influence may be understated versus that of Laozi Daoism (with which later scholarship has generally agreed).

While the Han Feizi later opposes Zichan with Shen Buhai, and there is no direct evidence Zichan influences Shen Buhai, his influential, much older current is still a plausible influence for the Han state preceding Shang Yang. Arguably, the Huangdi Sijing would have ideas going back to Zichan and Guan Zhong as well.

The Han Feizi reacts against Zichan. Opposing him with Shen Buhai's doctrine Han Fei termed Shu technique, and a purported reliance by Zichan on his own wisdom and senses as a detective, the Han Feizi advocates legal officials, manageable populace divisions, and clarifications of rules and measures, followed after using standardized administrative technique (fa-shu) as developed from Shen Buhai.

=== Li Kui & Wu Qi ===
The much later Han Feizi is the first preserved reference for writings associated with Shang Yang outside Qin. It will be easier to suggest that Shen Buhai might have been familiar with the older neighboring Wei state's Li Kui instead, who is said to have influenced Shang Yang. While the Han Feizi more evidently integrates "traditions associated with" Li Kui, Shaughnessy believes that Shen Buhai would at least be familiar Li Kui and his Canon of Laws as to initiate similar reforms, but more in the broad sense that they all sought more meritocratic governance. Li Kui was also more focused on education than Shang Yang.

While Creel didn't specifically take Wu Qi as example of Chu influence, the Han Feizi pairs Shang Yang with Wu Qi as a model reformer; Wu Qi's reforms were just not as successful as Shang Yang. Léon Vandermeersch believed that Shang Yang at least must have been familiar with Wu Qi. The Han Feizi also quotes Zhao Yang from the earlier Jin state.

== Laozi 17 ==
Scholar Wang Pei primarily treats the similarities and differences of Laozi, the Huangdi Sijing and Han Feizi. While contrasting Laozi's "avowed minimalism" with the "state activism" in "fa texts", at least in review with Wang Pei, Yuri Pines Dao Companion to China's fa tradition (2024) expresses openness to the idea that early thinkers like Shen Buhai were "indebted" to Laozi. Or, at least potential intermediary "Huang-Lao" texts, taking the Sijing as a recovered base of comparison (albeit much of its particular text would seem compiled later in the period, more comparable to the late Guanzi).

Taken as rooted in Huang-Lao (Yellow Emperor-Laozi (Daoism)) in the Shiji, Shen Buhai was unanimously accepted as Daoist-rooted in early modern scholarship based on comparison. As with earlier Chinese scholarship, Creel admits that he bears a "striking" resemblance to Laozi. But Creel comes from an early era of scholarship arguing a late dating for the Tao te Ching, and so questioned their chronology. Arguing against a Daoist interpretation of Shen Buhai, he translated of Dao "the way" as (administrative) method (as one meaning of Dao).

While Creel considered the term Legalist more accurate for Shang Yang, by his account Legalist ideas can be derived from the Tao te Ching's chapters 17-18 as interpreted by the Wenzi and J. J. L. Duyvendak, which is then carried over to the Han Feizi and Huainanzi. At basic, it simply requires that a less involved ruler place more direct value on people's literal words, rather than for instance a quiet ruler simply valuing their faithfulness.

The highest type of ruler is one of whose existence the people are barely aware... If good faith (of the prince towards the people) is inadequate, good faith (of the people towards the ruler) will be wanting. Thoughtful were (the sage rulers), valuing their words! J. J. L. Duyvendak 17. 1954.

The highest type of ruler is one of whose existence the people are barely aware... When you are lacking in faith, Others will be unfaithful to you. The Sage is self-effacing and scanty of words. John C. H. Wu, 17. 1961

If Shen Buhai was directly influenced by Laozi, he is significantly more administrative. While the ruler could be expected to engage in self-cultivation, reliable systems of government appear, at least for Shen Buhai, as legitimate a supplement to a calm mind. While emphasizing the internal tranquility of the ruler, he advocates a system of tallies with reliable ministers as its aid, and "inactivity" as "holding the levers of power" while delegating routine managerial functions.

Used as a method of administration in Chapter 5 of the Han Feizi (which includes ideas syncretized from Laozi and Shen Buhai), A.C. Graham considered the tally a metaphor which "shows up sharply (Han Fei's) difference from Laozi", as an "instrument for precise unimpugnable decisions" similar to other instruments of fa standards; classically, scales, compasses and the L-square.

=== "Acting" inactive ===
Laozi is not considered to favor law as with Han Fei or other "fa thinkers", as termed by Yuri Pines, even viewing it negatively. One traditional view would hold Shen Buhai as a member of the fa school. Shen Buhai might "absorb Daoist ideas" or even be influenced by Laozi, but would still be "in essence a representative example of fa thought", favoring interpretations centering on fa standards, laws and methods, including later-termed "techniques" of "practical politics".

Shen Buhai's ruler is differentiated from Laozi to the degree he only "acts" inactive in front of guests. "Acting" inactive, the ruler refrains from revealing himself and gets others to reveal themselves. Parts of the Han Feizi express doubt he can actually accomplish inactivity and maintain the state. But "acting" is a good way of learning. The Han Feizi's milieu would more commonly believe that "acting" inactive would help accomplish inactivity, even if some of its authors 'lack faith' or think they are just practicing realpolitk. The distinction that the ruler only "acts" inactive can be questioned.

The ruler is like a mirror, reflecting light, doing nothing, and yet, beauty and ugliness present themselves; (or like) a scale establishing equilibrium, doing nothing, and yet causing lightness and heaviness to discover themselves. The way (or method, Creel) is complete acquiescence. (Merging his) personal (concerns) with the public (weal), he does not act. He does not act, and yet the world itself is complete.

— Shen Buhai

While Shen Buhai does emphasize relying on law, Han Fei (ch.43) does not consider him to favor it as strongly as Shang Yang, contrasting the two. While Zhuangzi is generally inactive, Laozi and Shen Buhai share a similar idea of wu-wei (non-action) in the sense of a governmental technique. Sima Qian pairs him with Laozi and Zhuangzi, saying his teachings “were rooted in Huang-Lao and prioritized xingming.” Han Fei's chapter 5 pairs ideas adapted from Shen Buhai with that of Laozi.

Dao is the beginning of the myriad things, the standard of right and wrong. That being so, the intelligent ruler, by holding to the beginning, knows the source of everything, and, by keeping to the standard, knows the origin of good and evil. By virtue of resting empty and reposed, he waits for the course of nature to enforce itself so that all names will be defined of themselves and all affairs will be settled of themselves. Empty, he knows the essence of fullness: reposed, he becomes the corrector of motion. Who utters a word creates himself a name; who has an affair creates himself a form. Compare forms and names (Xing-Ming) and see if they are identical. Then the ruler will find nothing to worry about as everything is reduced to its reality. Han Feizi Ch5. W. K. Liao.

== Legal conservativism ==
While Chinese scholarship argues that Han Fei may understate Shen Buhai's legal reform in issuing laws, the Han Feizi also emphasizes he did not consolidate or repeal the old laws in comparison to Shang Yang. A fragment in the Yiwen Leiju emphasizes relying on fa standards that can include law, but also not altering them, referring to scales and the ancient Emperor Yao.

Master Shen said, “The ruler must have clear fa (standards, laws) and correct principles, just as one suspends a scale and balance-beam to weigh lightness and heaviness. Therewith his ministers are unified.” He also said, “Yao’s orderly rule was being good at clarifying fa and being scrupulous in issuing commands, and that is all. The sage ruler relies on fa and not on intelligence; he relies on methods (shu enumeration 數) and not on persuasions. When the Yellow Thearch ruled All under Heaven in an orderly fashion: he established fa and did not alter it; he caused the people to be secure and pleased by his fa.” (Yiwen leiju 54: 967; Creel 1974:353, 357)

If the Huangdi Sijing is taken as a point of comparison, then the Han Feizi's Chapter 29 may be poignant, as "arguably the most sophisticated blend of Han Fei’s and Laozi-related ideas".

Those in ancient times who preserved the Great Body intact, gazed out across Heaven and Earth, observed the rivers and the sea, and adapted to the mountains and valleys. … They neither encumbered their minds with intellect, nor encumbered themselves with selfishness. They consigned matters of order and chaos to laws and techniques, entrusted matters of right and wrong to rewards and punishments, and deputed questions of light and heavy to the scales and weights. They neither acted contrarily to Heaven’s patterns, nor harmed their nature… They kept to the established pattern and adapted to what was so by itself. People’s bad or good fortune originated in the law (or standard, fa) of the Way, and did not emerge from the ruler’s love or hatred.

== Shenzi bibliography ==
Shen Buhai was known for his cryptic writing style. Because the quotations attributed to him appeared to be pre-Han dynasty, Sinologist Herrlee G. Creel credited him with writing the now extinct text, listed in the Hanshu as six chapters, the Shenzi (申子) or "Master Shen", which is concerned almost exclusively with the philosophy of governmental administration. With the assistance of T.H. Tsien, Creel re-assembled its fragments, which were still used more modernly by Korean scholar Soon-Ja Yang in her review of Shen Buhai.

Creel's quotational fragments total 1347 characters. But this refers to Creel's curated material and is not all material; Creel has sections of other material. Before Creel, the Chinese scholar Hou Wailu (1903–1987) collected some 700 characters for his famous (untranslated) history of Chinese thought.

In 141 BC, under the influence of Confucians, the reign of Emperor Wu of Han saw Shen Buhai's name listed along with other thinkers classed as "Legalist" (Fajia, later described as Legalist which would be more accurate for Shang Yang), officially banning their ideas from the government. From that point on, scholarship relating to Shen's ideas went into a steep decline, despite continued use of his foundational ideas in administration, much of which, consisting of skill and report checking, would be unavoidable.

Widely read in Han times, in comparison to the still-complete Han Feizi the Shenzi was listed as lost by the Liang dynasty (502–556). Appearing again in the bibliographies of both Tang histories, its only traces remain as quotes. During the Qing dynasty, three major attempts were made to reconstruct the contents of the work, the last mention occurring in 1616, and in a library catalogue from 1700. Creel believed that it still existed in 1616.

Compiled in the Tang dynasty, Shen Buhai's most major quotations survive in the 600 character “Da ti” 大體 chapter of Shenzi in Wei Zheng's encyclopedic Qunshu Zhiyao 群書治要, or "Essentials of orderly rule from multiple books" compiled in 631 A.D. The second most major source is the biographies of Yilin, compiled around 786. Though not typically listed as major sources by comparison, the late Qin state's encyclopedic Lushi Chunqiu incorporates a selection from Shen Buhai's doctrine, as does the later Song dynasty's encyclopedic Taiping Yulan.

=== Lushi Chunqiu ===
The Lushi Chunqiu selection includes a story about Shen Buhai and his ruler, intended to illustrate the need for what was later termed Shu (administrative) technique. Shen Buhai's ruler is overseeing a temple sacrifice, but the pig is too small, and the king orders it replaced. The king observes that the minister appears to return with the same pig, but this only results in his followers questioning how he determined this (as it would likely result in his punishment). Shen Buhai instructs that governing the realm using the ruler's own superficial personal senses and wisdom will be insufficient (instead relying on technique and supervision to determine the reality of affairs). Not relying on the ruler's senses will bring order, but relying on them will bring about chaos.

The chapter is titled Zhushu "Technique of the Ruler", which is notably similar to the Han Feizi's Chapter 5 Zhudao "Way of the Ruler". "Technique" is also a term the Han Feizi uses, which Creel argued was a later term. One of the authors may have been familiar with the other (Goldin places the Han Feizi earlier), including recommendations that the King delegate responsibilities to his ministers as not to involve himself. Liu Xiang later recalls Shen Buhai's doctrine in this same sense; affairs will settle themselves and flow more naturally if the king does not personally involve in them, relying on techniques, supervision and accountability to do away with the entanglements of punishment.

=== Han Feizi 43 ===
Though contrasting Shang Yang and Shen Buhai, Chapter 43 ("Ding fa" 定法) of the Han Feizi likely contributed to their association, and a Legalist interpretation of what the Confucians later called the Fa school. Admitting him as issuing some law, it blames Shen Buhai as failing to consolidate the law. Taking Shang Yang as representative, Han Fei considered fa necessary, as including promulgation of law, decrees, reward and punishment.

The Han Feizi differentiates Shen Buhai from Shang Yang under the term Shu 术 Method or Technique, defined here as bestowing office on the basis of concrete responsibilities, examining the abilities of ministers, appointing candidates in accordance with their capabilities, demanding ministerial achievements or "performance" (xing "forms") accountable to their proposals or "titles" (ming "names") as becoming offices, and grasping fast the handles of life and death. Han Fei recommends following after rules and measures using Shu technique.

Although the term Shu (technique) appears in some later Shen Buhai fragments, Creel would argue that the term had not yet developed in Shen Buhai's own time, considering these later fragments. Critical Chinese and Korean scholarship generally seem to support this assertion, considering the association to come from the Han Feizi. Hence, it is said in gloss that Shu technique does not appear in the fragments. Shen Buhai has ideas of fa (method), to some extent law, an earlier conceptual term of Shu (enumeration) or quantitative technique, and rectification of names.

==== Salt and Iron debates ====
Though not the Han Feizi's only relevant selection, scholarship prominently recalls Chapter 43 of the Han Feizi. Admitting Shen Buhai as issuing laws but failing to consolidate them, it glosses him with meritocratic Shu technique, and Shang Yang with fa as primarily just penal law. The Han Feizi establishes an association between Shang Yang and Wu Qi as model reformers earlier in its work.

The Yantielun would seem to mention Shen Buhai only once, in chapter 56 申韓 Shen Han. Mentioning him together with Shang Yang as making their respective states strong using fa, an interpretation of fa as just law and Shen Buhai as just a (penal) Legalist, is reinforced through glossed Shang Yang associations narrowed down from that earlier established in the Han Feizi.

[According to (Shang Yang's) doctrine of fa], laws and decrees are promulgated to the government offices, the inevitability of deserved punishment is impressed upon the minds of the people, rewards upon the minds of the people, rewards are reserved for those who are careful to respect the laws, and punishment is visited upon those who violate orders. Creel HFZ 43

夫善為政者，弊則補之，決則塞之，故吳子以法治楚、魏，申、商以法彊秦、韓也。
If there is a minor flaw in governance, laws and decrees can be used to prevent it... Those who are good at governing repair what is defective and block what is broken, which is why Wu Zi used legal methods to strengthen Chu and Wei, and Shen Buhai and Shang Yang used law (法 fa) to make Qin and Han powerful." Ctext. Yan Tie Lun v.10 56.1

== Philosophy ==
Though not unifying the laws of the early Han state, as Shang Yang did in the Qin, what Shen "appears to have realized" is that the "methods for the control of a bureaucracy" could not be mixed with feudal government, or staffed merely by "getting together a group of 'good men,'" but must be men qualified in their jobs. Unlike Shang Yang, Shen therefore emphasizes the importance of selecting able officials as much as Confucius did, but insists on "constant vigilance over their performance."

Shen insisted that the ruler must be fully informed on the state of his realm, but could not afford to get caught up in details – and does not, Creel says, have the time to do so, eschewing personal appointments. The way to see and hear independently is by grouping particulars into categories through mechanical or operational decision-making (Fa or "method").

However, in comparison with the later, more mechanically developed Han Fei, his system still required a strong ruler, emphasizing that he trust no one minister. Shen Buhai's ideal ruler would still have to have had the widest possible sovereignty, be intelligent (if not a sage), have to make all crucial decisions himself, and have unlimited control of the bureaucracy - over which, in contrast to Shang Yang, he is simply the head. Championing Fa (法 "method"), Shen believed that the greatest threat to a ruler's power came from within, and unlike Han Fei, never preaches to his ministers about duty or loyalty.

Shen Buhai's doctrines, posthumously referred to by Han Fei as Shu or Technique (a term Shen may not have used), are described as concerned almost exclusively with the "ruler's role and the methods by which he may control a bureaucracy," that is, its management and personnel control: the selection of capable ministers, their performance, the monopolization of power, and the control of and relations between ruler and minister which he characterized as Wu Wei. They can therefore easily be considered the most crucial element in controlling a bureaucracy.

More specifically, Shen Buhai's methods (Fa) focused on "scrutinizing achievement and on that ground alone to give rewards, and to bestow office solely on the basis of ability." Liu Xiang wrote that Shen Buhai advised the ruler of men use technique (shu) rather than punishment, relying on persuasion to supervise and hold responsible, though very strictly. Liu considered Shen's "principal tenet" to be (Xing-Ming 刑名). Representing equally applied checks against the power of officials, Xing-Ming seeks the right person for the job through the examination of skill, achievement and (more rarely) seniority.

=== Personnel selection ===
Shen Buhai's personnel control, or rectification of names (crudely, "office titles") worked through "strict performance control," correlating performance and posts. It would become a central tenet of both "Legalist" statecraft and its Taoistic derivatives. Creel believed that the correlation between Wu-wei and Xing-ming may have informed the Taoist conception of the formless Tao that "gives rise to the ten thousand things."

In the Han dynasty secretaries of government who had charge of the records of decisions in criminal matters were called Xing-Ming, a term used by Han Fei, which Sima Qian (145 or 135 – 86 BC) and Liu Xiang (77 BC – 6 BC) attributed to the doctrine of Shen Buhai(400 BC – c. 337 BC). Liu Xiang goes as far as to define Shen Buhai's doctrine as Xing-Ming. Shen actually used an older, more philosophically common equivalent, ming-shih, linking the "Legalist doctrine of names" with the name and reality (ming shih) debates of the school of names. Such discussions are also prominent in the Han Feizi.

Sima Qian and Liu Xiang define Xing-Ming as "holding actual outcome accountable to Ming." Ming sometimes has the sense of speech—so as to compare the statements of an aspiring officer with the reality of his actions—or reputation, again compared with real conduct (xing "form" or shih "reality"). Rather than having to look for "good" men, Xing-Ming (or ming-shih) can seek the right man for a particular post, though doing so implies a total organizational knowledge of the regime. More simply though, it can allow ministers to come forward with proposals of specific cost and time frame, leaving their definition to competing ministers—the doctrine favored by Han Fei. Preferring exactness, it combats the tendency to promise too much; the correct articulation of Ming is considered crucial to the realization of projects.

The logician Deng Xi (died 501 BCE) is cited by Liu Xiang for the origin of the principle of Xing-Ming. Serving as a minor official in the state of Zheng, he is reported to have drawn up a code of penal laws. Associated with litigation, he is said to have argued for the permissibility of contradictory propositions, likely engaging in hair-splitting debates on the interpretation of laws, legal principles and definitions.

Shen Buhai solves this through Wu wei, or not getting involved, making an official's words his own responsibility. Shen Buhai says, "The ruler controls the policy, the ministers manage affairs. To speak ten times and ten times be right, to act a hundred times and a hundred times succeed - this is the business of one who serves another as minister; it is not the way to rule." Noting all the details of a claim and then attempting to objectively compare them with his achievements through passive mindfulness (the "method of yin"), Shen Buhai's ruler neither adds to nor detracts from anything, giving names (titles/offices) on the basis of claim.

Shen supported reward for visible results, using ming-shih for investigation and appointment, but the legal system of Han was apparently confused, prohibiting uniform reward and punishment. We have no basis to suppose that Shen advocated the doctrine of rewards and punishment (of Shang Yang, as Han Fei did), and Han Fei criticizes him for not unifying the laws.

=== Wu wei ===
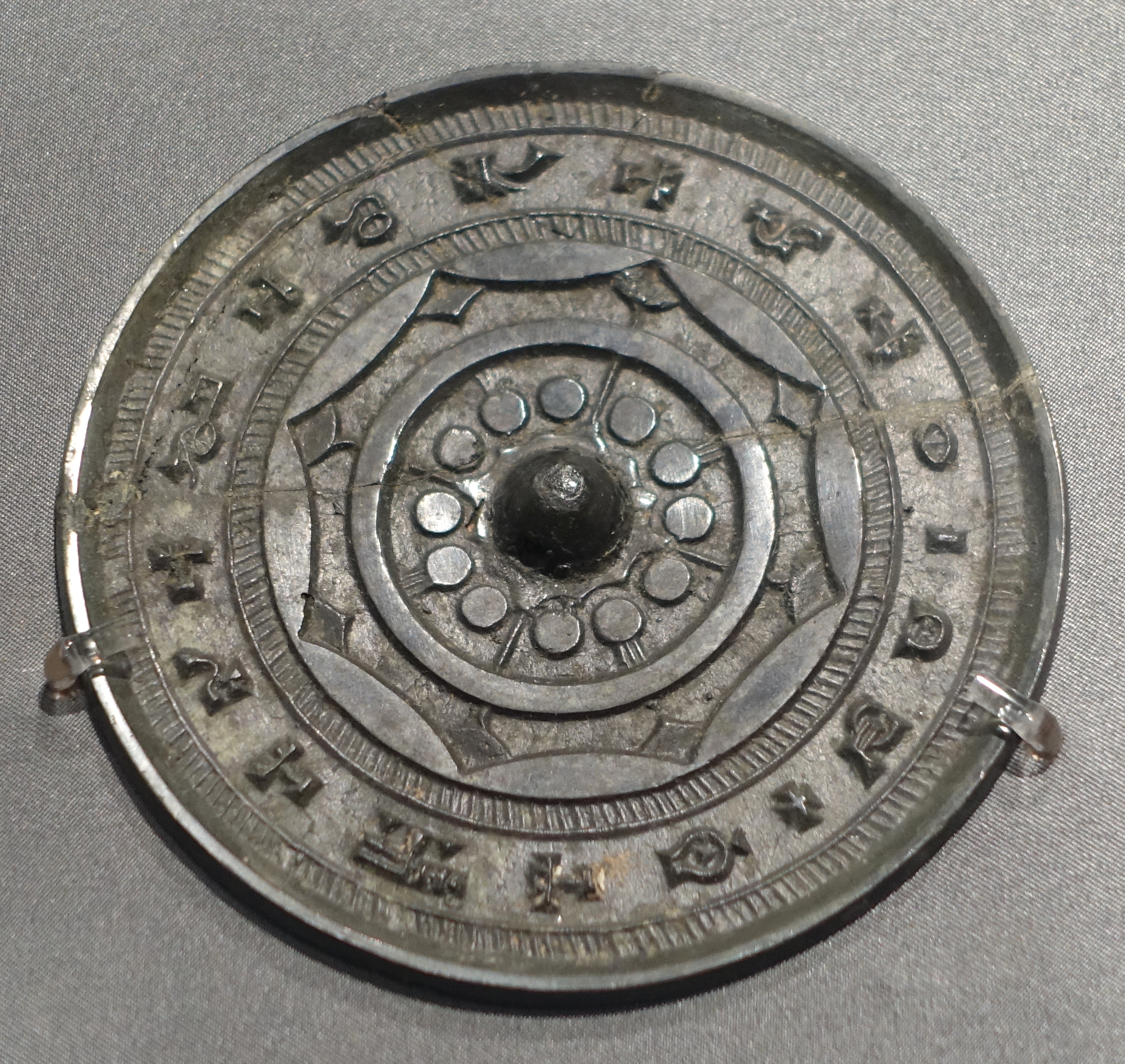
Zhaoming Mirror frame, Western Han dynasty

Following Shen, Han Fei strongly advocated Wu wei. During the Han dynasty up until the reign of Han Wudi, rulers confined their activity "chiefly to the appointment and dismissal of his high officials," a plainly "Legalist" practice inherited from the Qin dynasty. This "conception of the ruler's role as a supreme arbiter, who keeps the essential power firmly in his grasp" while leaving details to ministers, has a "deep influence on the theory and practice of Chinese monarchy."

Shen Buhai argued that if the government were organized and supervised relying on proper method (Fa), the ruler need do little—and must do little. Unlike "Legalists" Shang Yang and Han Fei, Shen did not consider the relationship between ruler and minister antagonistic necessarily. Apparently paraphrasing the Analects, Shen Buhai's statement that those near him will feel affection, while the far will yearn for him, stands in contrast to Han Fei, who considered the relationship between the ruler and ministers irreconcilable.

However, Shen still believed that the ruler's most able ministers are his greatest danger, and is convinced that it is impossible to make them loyal without techniques. Creel explains: "The ruler's subjects are so numerous, and so on alert to discover his weaknesses and get the better of him, that it is hopeless for him alone as one man to try to learn their characteristics and control them by his knowledge... the ruler must refrain from taking the initiative, and from making himself conspicuous--and therefore vulnerable--by taking any overt action."

Emphasizing the use of administrative methods (Fa) in secrecy, Shen Buhai portrays the ruler as putting up a front to hide his weaknesses and dependence on his advisers. Shen therefore advises the ruler to keep his own counsel, hide his motivations, and conceal his tracks in inaction, availing himself of an appearance of stupidity and insufficiency. Shen says:

If the ruler's intelligence is displayed, men will prepare against it; if his lack of intelligence is displayed, they will delude him. If his wisdom is displayed, men will gloss over (their faults); if his lack of wisdom is displayed, they will hide from him. If his lack of desires is displayed, men will spy out his true desires; if his desires are displayed, they will tempt him. Therefore (the intelligent ruler) says 'I cannot know them; it is only by means of non-action that I control them.'

Acting through administrative method (Fa), the ruler conceals his intentions, likes and dislikes, skills and opinions. Not acting himself, he can avoid being manipulated. The ruler plays no active role in governmental functions. He should not use his talent even if he has it. Not using his own skills, he is better able to secure the services of capable functionaries. Creel argues that not getting involved in details allowed Shen's ruler to "truly rule," because it leaves him free to supervise the government without interfering, maintaining his perspective. Seeing and hearing independently, the ruler is able to make decisions independently, and is, Shen says, able to rule the world thereby.

The ruler is like a mirror, reflecting light, doing nothing, and yet, beauty and ugliness present themselves; (or like) a scale establishing equilibrium, doing nothing, and yet causing lightness and heaviness to discover themselves. (Administrative) method (Fa) is complete acquiescence. (Merging his) personal (concerns) with the public (weal), he does not act. He does not act, and yet the world itself is complete.

— Shen Buhai

This Wu wei (or nonaction) might be said to end up the political theory of the "Legalists," if not becoming their general term for political strategy, playing a "crucial role in the promotion of the autocratic tradition of the Chinese polity." The (qualified) non-action of the ruler ensures his power and the stability of the polity.

==== Yin (passive mindfulness) ====
A commentary to the Shiji cites a now-lost book, quoting as Shen Buhai saying: "By employing (yin), 'passive mindfulness', in overseeing and keeping account of his vassals, accountability is deeply engraved." The Guanzi similarly says: "Yin is the way of non-action. Yin is neither to add to nor to detract from anything. To give something a name strictly on the basis of its form – this is the Method of yin." Yin aimed at concealing the ruler's intentions, likes and opinions. Despite such injunctions, it is clear that the ruler's assignments would still be completely up to him.

Sinologist John Makeham explains: "assessing words and deeds requires the ruler's dispassionate attention; (yin is) the skill or technique of making one's mind a tabula rasa, non-committaly taking note of all the details of a man's claims and then objectively comparing his achievements of the original claims." Adherence to the use of technique in governing requires the ruler not engage in any interference or subjective consideration.

== Appendix ==
=== Legalist speculations ===
Sinologist Hansen recalls Schwartz (1985) as citing Han Fei's two handles of punishment and reward as clearly part of Shu, in rebuttal to Creel's insistence that Shen Buhai was not a Legalist. As at least illustrative of Han Fei, Hansen focuses on Shu "method" or "technique" as safeguarding the ruler's power to punish and reward, which must be kept in his hands, that punishment and reward can not be meted out without the ruler's approval, or that persons are immune to it.

As compared with Shang Yang, the thrust of the more administrative Shu is not the establishment of fa as codified law. Rather, relying on fa (objective standards), the ruler ought at least not mete out reward or punishment on mere recommendation or fame. A monopoly over reward and punishment does not itself make Shen Buhai or his ruler a Shang Yangian Legalist, even if Han Fei advocates it. Hence, Creel would argue that Han Fei does not himself consider Shen Buhai a Shang Yangian Legalist (although the concept of Legalist did not exist yet.)

Whether it was itself relying on the Han Feizi's account or not, the Huainanzi says that when Shen Buhai lived, the officials of the state of Han were at cross-purposes and did not know what practices to follow. Shaughnessy points out that Shen Buhai would have at least been aware of Li Kui's book of law, as Shang Yang's predecessor. Taking Li Kui as a hypothetical influence, Shaughnessy only suggests Shen Buhai as similar in the sense of attempting to implement a more meritocratic government.

Tao Jiang notes Korean scholar Soon-Ja Yang as still relying on Creel's fragments, taking the "absence of Shu much more seriously." Opposing Han Fei's comparison of him with Shang Yang, in favour of a more Confucian-Legalist interpretation, she interpolates a universal registry along the lines of the Confucian rectification of names. Not specifically endorsing the interpretation, Tao Jiang takes her as illustrative of Creel, namely that Shen Buhai does not follow Han Fei's (significantly later) broader doctrine, but rather as aiming at a cooperative, impartial government along Creel lines.

=== Legacy ===
Considering Creel correct to distinguish between the stands of 'Legalism', Michael Loewe, in the Cambridge History of China, argued for their complementarity. Han Fei called both branches "the instruments of Kings and Emperors," and Li Si praises them equally, finding no contradiction between them. If he was influential in it, Loewe supposes that Shen Buhai's influence may have made Qin government more sophisticated and reasonable, as it appeared, than could be expected of the dogma of the Book of Lord Shang alone. Questioning the thrust of tracing lineages between the personas, Loewe characterizes Han dynasty persons potentially influenced by Shen Buhai as sympathizers of imperial government over that of the small states, endeavoring to permanently establish imperial government without the dangers that destroyed the Qin.

Creel elaborates a number of figures influenced potentially by Shen Buhai. These include Emperor Qinshihuang, Han figures Jia Yi, Emperor Wen of Han, Emperor Jing of Han, Chao Cuo, Dong Zhongshu, Gongsun Hong, and Emperor Xuan of Han, and Emperor Wen of Sui. Although a Confucian-oriented minister, Zhuge Liang is noted (by others) as attaching great importance to the work of Han Fei and Shen Buhai. Emperor Qinshihuang erected an inscription naming himself as taking control of the government and for the first time establishing Xing-Ming, as retroactive terminology for Shen Buhai's method.

The Shiji records Li Si as repeatedly recommending "supervising and holding responsible," which he attributed to Shen Buhai. A stele set up by Qin Shi Huang memorializes him as a sage that, taking charge of the government, established Xing-Ming. The Shiji states that Emperor Wen of Han was "basically fond of Xing-Ming."

The scholar Jia Yi advised Wen to teach his heir to use Shen Buhai's method, so as to be able to "supervise the functions of the many officials and understand the usages of government." Bringing together Confucian and Daoist discourses, Jia Yi describes Shen Buhai's Shu as a particular method of applying the Dao, or virtue. He uses the imagery of the Zhuangzi of the knife and hatchet as examples of skillful technique in both virtue and force, saying "benevolence, righteousness, kindness and generosity are the ruler's sharp knife. Power, purchase, law and regulation are his axe and hatchet." Two advisors to Wen's heir, Emperor Jing of Han were students of Xing-Ming, one passing the highest grade of examination, and admonished Jing for not using it on the feudal lords.

By the time of the civil service examination was put into place, Confucian influence saw outright discussion of Shen Buhai banned. However, the Emperor under which it was founded, Emperor Wu of Han, was both familiar with and favorable to Legalist ideas, and the civil service examination did not come into existence until its support by Gongsun Hong, who wrote a book on Xing-Ming. The Emperor Xuan of Han was still said by Liu Xiang to have been fond of reading Shen Buhai, using Xing-Ming to control his subordinates and devoting much time to legal cases.

Heir successor Emperor Jing of Han also had two mentors in the doctrines of Shen Buhai, and appointed another Legalist, Chao Cuo. Chao Cuo is regarded by the Hanshu as a student of the doctrines of Shen Buhai, Shang Yang and Xing-Ming. Unlike Jia Yi, he does appear to take interest in Shang Yang. Following the Rebellion of the Seven Kingdoms, Emperor Jing reformed criminal penalties to reduce injustices and punishments.

An advocate for the civil service examinations, Dong Zhongshu's writings on personnel testing and control uses Ming-shih in a manner "hardly distinguishable" from the Han Feizi, but unlike Han Fei, advocate against punishments. Dong's advocacy aside, the civil service examination did not come into existence until its support by Gongsun Hong, who wrote a book on xingming. Thus, Creel credits the origination of the civil service examination in part to Shen Buhai.

The Emperor Xuan of Han was still said by Liu Xiang to have been fond of reading Shen Buhai, using Xing-Ming to control his subordinates and devoting much time to legal cases. Regarded as being in opposition to Confucians, as Confucianism ascended the term disappeared. As early as the Eastern Han its full and original meaning would be forgotten. Yet, it appears in later dynasties, and Emperor Wen of Sui is recorded as having withdrawn his favour from the Confucians, giving it to "the group advocating Xing-Ming and authoritarian government."

== Sources ==
- Duyvendak, J.J.L. (1992). Tao Te Ching. Charles E. Tuttle. ISBN 978-0804818131.
- Csikszentmihalyi, Mark (1997). "Chia I's "Techniques of the Tao" and the Han Confucian Appropriation of Technical Discourse". Asia Major. 10 (1/2): 49–67. JSTOR 41645528.
- Chang, Leo S (1998). The Four Political Treatises of the Yellow Emperor: Original Mawangdui Texts with Complete English Translations and an Introduction. Society for Asian and Comparative Philosophy. Monograph No.15. University of Hawaiʻi Press.
- Harris, Eirik Lang (2016). The Shenzi Fragments. New York: Columbia University Press. ISBN 9780231542166.
- Creel, Herrlee Glessner (September 15, 1982) [1970]. What Is Taoism?: And Other Studies in Chinese Cultural History. University of Chicago Press. ISBN 9780226120478. JSTOR 1397689. OCLC 1256745090 – via Google Books.
- Creel, Herrlee Glessner (1974). Shen Pu-hai: Chinese Political Philosopher of the Fourth Century B.C. University of Chicago Press. ISBN 978-0-226-12027-0.
- Creel, Herrlee Glessner (1959). "The Meaning of Hsing-Ming". Studia Serica: Sinological studies dedicated to Bernhard Kalgren. Copenhagen: Ejnar Munksgaard. pp. 200–211.
- Cua, Antonio S. (2003). Encyclopedia of Chinese Philosophy. Routledge. ISBN 9781135367480.
- Emerson, John (2013). Shen Dao: Text, Translation, and Study. Éditions Le Real. OCLC 911414271.
- Fraser, Chris (2011). Oxford Handbook of World Philosophy. Oup USA. ISBN 978-0-19-532899-8.
- Goldin, Paul R. (2005). After Confucius: Studies In Early Chinese Philosophy. University of Hawai'i Press. ISBN 978-0-8248-2842-4.
- Goldin, Paul R. (2005a). "Insidious Syncretism in the Political Philosophy of Huainanzi". University of Hawai'i Press: 90–111.
- Goldin, Paul R. (2011). "Persistent Misconceptions about Chinese "Legalism"" (PDF). Journal of Chinese Philosophy. 38 (1): 88–104.
- Goldin, Paul R. (2012). Dao Companion to the Philosophy of Han Fei. Dao Companions to Chinese Philosophy. University of Pennsylvania: Springer. ISBN 978-0-19-760347-5.
  - Pines, Yuri (2013), Submerged by Absolute Power: The Ruler's Predicament in the Han Feizi. In: Dao Companion to the Philosophy of Han Fei (PDF), pp. 67–86, doi:10.1007/978-94-007-4318-2_4, ISBN 978-94-007-4317-5
- Metzger, Thomas A. (1976). "Ultimate Wisdom or Applied Psychology? A Review of Creel's Shen Pu-hai". Early China. 2: 18–29. doi:10.1017/S036250280000100X.
- Graham, A. C. (1989). Disputers of the Tao. LaSalle, IL: Open Court. ISBN 9780812690873.
- Hansen, Chad (1992). A Daoist Theory of Chinese Thought. Oxford: Oxford University Press. ISBN 978-0-19-535076-0.
- Hansen, Chad (2020). "Daoism". In Zalta, Edward N.; Nodelman, Uri (eds.). Stanford Encyclopedia of Philosophy (Fall 2020 ed.).
- —— (2014). Xunzi: The Complete Text. Translated by Hutton, Eric. Princeton: Princeton University Press. doi:10.2307/j.ctt6wq19b. S2CID 246223800.
- Hou, Wailu; Zhao, Jibin; Du, Guoxiang (1962) [1957]. Zhōngguó sīxiǎng tōngshǐ (中国思想通史) (in Chinese). Vol. 1 (1st (5th printing) ed.). Beijing: Renmin Chubanshe (人民出版社). CSBN 2001.77.
- Hutton, Eric L., ed. (2016). Dao Companion to the Philosophy of Xunzi. Dao Companions to Chinese Philosophy. Vol. 7. New York: Springer. doi:10.1007/978-94-017-7745-2. ISBN 978-94-017-7745-2.
- Hsiao, Kung-Chuan (1979). A History of Chinese Political Thought. University of Chicago Press. ISBN 978-0-691-61289-8.
- Hsieh, S.Y. (1985). "The Legalist Philosophers". In Barlow, Jeffrey G.; Bishop, Donald H. (eds.). Chinese Thought: An Introduction. Motilal Banarsidass. ISBN 9780836411300.
- Jiang, Tao (2021). Origins of Moral-political Philosophy in Early China. Oxford: Oxford University Press. ISBN 978-0-19-760347-5.
- Jin, Dejian (1963). Sima Qian suo jian shu kao 司馬遷所見書考. Shanghai: Shanghai ren ming chu ban she. OCLC 20065670.
- Kejian, Huang (2016). From Destiny to Dao. Davies Pacific Center: Enrich Professional Publishing. ISBN 978-1-62320-023-7.
- Knechtges, David R. (2014). "Shenzi" 申子. In Knechtges, David R.; Chang, Taiping (eds.). Ancient and Early Medieval Chinese Literature: A Reference Guide, Part Two. Leiden: Brill. pp. 874–75.
- Lai, Karyn (2017-03-30). An Introduction to Chinese Philosophy. Cambridge University Press. ISBN 978-1-316-84185-3.
- Liu, Xiaogan (2014). Xiaogan Liu (ed.). Dao Companion to Daoist Philosophy. Springer. ISBN 9789048129270.
- Loewe, Michael (1986). The Cambridge History of China, Vol. 1: The Ch'in and Han Empires, 221 BC-AD 220. Cambridge: Cambridge University Press. ISBN 978-0-521-24327-8.
- Loewe, Michael (1999). The Cambridge History of Ancient China. Cambridge University Press. ISBN 978-0-521-47030-8.
- Major, John S. (2010). The Huainanzi A Guide to the Theory and Practice of Government in Early Han China. Columbia University Press. ISBN 978-0-231-52085-0.
- Makeham, John (1990). "The Legalist Concept of Hsing-Ming: An Example of the Contribution of Archaeological Evidence to the Re-Interpretation of Transmitted Texts". Monumenta Serica. 39: 87–114. doi:10.1080/02549948.1990.11731214. JSTOR 40726902.
- Makeham, John (1994-07-22). Name and Actuality in Early Chinese Thought. SUNY Press. ISBN 978-0-7914-1984-7.
- Peerenboom, R. P. (1993). Law and Morality in Ancient China: The Silk Manuscripts of Huang-Lao. State University of New York Press. ISBN 9781438415741.
- Pines, Yuri (2017). The Book of Lord Shang: Apologetics of State Power in Early China. Columbia University Press. ISBN 9780231542333.
- Pines, Yuri (2017b). The Book of Lord Shang: Apologetics of State Power in Early China. Abridged Edition. Columbia University Press. ISBN 978-0-231-55038-3.
- Pines, Yuri (2024). Dao Companion to China's fa Tradition. Hebrew University of Jerusalem: Springer. ISBN 9789048129270.
  - Yu, Zhong. "On Shen Buhai's Legal Thought". In Pines (2024), pp. 57-82.
  - Lewis, Mark Edward. "Chapter 11 The Ruler in the Polity of Objective Standards". In Pines (2024), pp. 315-349.
  - Wang, Pei. "Chapter 20. Laozi, Huang-Lao and the fa Tradition: Thinking Through the Term xingming 刑名". In Pines (2024), pp. 575-594.
- Schwartz, Benjamin I. (1985). The World of Thought in Ancient China. Cambridge, Massachusetts: Harvard University Press. ISBN 978-0-674-96191-3.
- Shaughnessy, Edward L (2023). A Brief History of Ancient China. Bloomsbury Publishing. ISBN 9780226120478.
- Vandermeersch, Léon (1987) [1965]. La formation du légisme. École française d'Extrême-Orient. ISBN 2855395410.
- Winston, Kenneth (2005). "The Internal Morality of Chinese Legalism". Singapore Journal of Legal Studies: 313–347.
- Wu, John C. H. (2006). Tao Teh Ching (Reprint ed.). Shambhala. ISBN 978-1590304051.
- Guo, Xuezhi (2002). The Ideal Chinese Political Leader: A Historical and Cultural Perspective. Bloomsbury Academic. ISBN 9780275972592.
