= Huang–Lao =

Influential Chinese school of thought

Huang–Lao (simplified Chinese: 黄老; traditional Chinese: 黃老; pinyin: Huáng-Lǎo; Wade–Giles: Huang-lao; lit. 'Huangdi–Laozi') was the most influential Chinese school of thought in the early Han dynasty, having its origins in a broader political-philosophical drive looking for solutions to strengthen the feudal order as depicted in Zhou politics. Not systematically explained by historiographer Sima Qian, it is generally interpreted as a school of Syncretism, developing into a major religion, the beginnings of religious Taoism.

Emphasizing the search for immortality, Feng Youlan and Herrlee Creel considered its religious Taoism to be different from if not contradictory to the more philosophical strain of Taoism found in the Zhuangzi. Probably originating together around 300 BCE, the more politically dominant Huang–Lao denoted both for much of the Han. Highly favoured by superstitious rulers, it dominated the intellectual life of the Qin and early Han together with "Chinese Legalism", and the term "Taoism" (Chinese: 道家; pinyin: dàojiā) was probably coined with elements of Huang–Lao literature in mind.

Coming to mean something like Daoism, Sima Tan likely coined the term Daojia (Dao family or "school") with Huang–Lao content in mind, and is traditionally classified under it. Likely shorthand for dao and de ("the way and its power"), and then a new synthesis, Daojia would not have meant the exact same thing as Huang-Lao, but they are often used interchangeably in the Shiji. Laozi and Zhuangzi would later be taken as baseline examples of the dao school. Although Sima Qian does favour them, Tan's description of the school arguably accords more with content they had described as Huang–Lao.

== Terminology ==
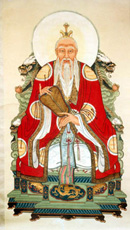
Huanglao jun, Daoist deification of Laozi

Huang–Lao is a portmanteau, with Huang being the Yellow Emperor, and Lao being Laozi. The related Daoist name Daode Tianzun was a deification of Laozi as a reincarnated personification of the Dao.

The term Huang-Lao first appears in the (109 – 91 BCE) Records of the Grand Historian, which was begun by Sima Tan and completed by his son Sima Qian. Sima Tan (at least possibly) studied under a Huang–Lao master with a philosophical lineage dating back to the Warring States period Jixia Academy at the court of Qi in modern Shandong.

== Political views ==
Hans van Ess analyzed the Shiji and Hanshu biographies of 2nd-century BCE individuals described as "Huang–Lao" followers, and found they were either members of a Huang–Lao faction or a Ru "Confucian" and Fa "Legalist" faction. The historian Sima Qian used the term Huang–Lao "as a characterization of persons belonging to a political group which was the faction he belonged to as well." These historical members of the Huang–Lao faction had three political policies in common: "opposing the campaigns in the north" against the Xiongnu, "affiliation to rich and independent families with a power-base far from the capital" at Chang'an, and "opposing the measures to deprive the feudal kings of their power."

The rich families of Huang–Lao may be said to have considered the emperor a first among equals rather than someone vested with absolute authority. Naturally, as someone favoring his class and ideology with it, Sima Tan's work was rather biased towards Daoism and feudalism (or the Chinese version of it). Sima Qian considered Emperor Wen of Han and Emperor Jing of Han, the Empress Dowager Dou, Cao Can, Chen Ping and Tian Shu to be Huang–Lao proponents.

It was probably the earliest movement that linked together Laozi, Zhuangzi, the worship of Yellow Emperor, the School of Naturalists, elements of Chinese folk religion, and aspects from the other Hundred Schools of Thought. Huang–Lao Daoist philosophy was favoured at the Western Han courts of Emperor Wen (r. 180–157 BCE) and Emperor Jing (r. 157–141 BCE), before Emperor Wu (r. 141–87 BCE) established Confucianism as the state philosophy.

Huang–Lao was eclipsed by the "Legalistic" Gongsun Hong and Zhang Tang, with Gongsun founding the Confucian academy.

== Texts ==
If the term is defined vaguely, a number of pre-Qin texts might retroactively be included under the term Huang–Lao. Excepting the Huangdi Neijing, most Huang–Lao texts vanished, and traditional scholarship associated the philosophical school with syncretist Chinese classics, namely the legalistic Hanfeizi, the Daoistic Huainanzi, but also the more Confucian Xunzi and Guanzi. Other proposals include parts of the Daoist Zhuangzi, sections of the historical Guoyu ("Discourses of the States"), Chunqiu Fanlu ("Luxuriant Dew of the Spring and Autumn Annals"), and Lüshi Chunqiu ("Mister Lü's Spring and Autumn Annals"), the Heguanzi ("Book of Master Pheasant-Cap"), and the military Huang Shigong San Lüe ("Three Strategies of Huang Shigong").

Randall P. Peerenboom criticizes the tendency to classify all these texts together and "make of 'Huang-Lao' a dustbin by sweeping too much into it". If defined more strictly, nothing before the Han dynasty could be called Huang–Lao. No pre-Qin text actually uses the term. Modern scholars are reinterpreting Huang–Lao following the 1973 discovery of the legalistic Mawangdui Silk Texts, which included four manuscripts, called the Huang-Lao boshu (黄老帛书 "Huang-Lao Silk Texts"), that are controversially identified as the long-lost Huangdi Sijing ("Yellow Emperor's Four Classics") or a text related with the Heguanzi.

== Early syncretism ==
The syncretism of "Legalistic" texts like that of Shen Dao and the Han Feizi are sometimes considered early examples of Huang–Lao. The more purely administrative Shen Buhai was said to be the earliest known political philosopher to have been influenced by such ideology. However, Sima Tan's argument that Shen Buhai and Shen Dao studied Huang–Lao is problematic. As its spokesman, Sima Tan probably pushes back Huang–Lao's origin as far as possible.

One way Huang–Lao's rule of law from Han Fei with a greater emphasis on naturalism. It also acts as more of a theoretical constraint on the ruler. Even when Shen Buhai's work existed in its entirety, it was not necessarily lengthy, and is highly focused on administration. Neither Shen Buhai nor Shen Dao ever attempts to articulate natural or ethical foundations for fa (administrative method), or provide any metaphysical grounds for appointment (xing-ming). The Han Huang–Lao work Boshu grounds fa and xing-ming in the Taoist Dao.

A number of chapters of the Guanzi, which places considerable importance on traditional Confucian values, express a blend of what may be considered Legalistic, Confucian, and Daoistic philosophy that might be termed "Huang-Lao". Having its base in Qi, it spread south to develop in areas belonging to Chu. Chu culture being inherited by the Han dynasty, preceding the consolidation of the realm deft Han Emperors like Jing would be steeped in a Taoistic laissez-faire, and later texts like the Huainanzi include naturalist arguments against rule by law ("Chinese Legalism") in favour of rule by worthies on the basis that one needs their competence for such things as diplomacy. Historically all such material would end up criticized as Fajia.

== Han dynasty ==
Two influential ministers of Emperor Gaozu of Han reportedly studied and applied Huang–Lao political ideology, Chancellors Cao Shen (d. 190 BCE) and his successor Chen Ping (d. 178 BCE) employed the policy of wuwei ("inaction") and brought peace and stability to the state of Qi. Chao Cuo (d. 154 BCE), Chancellor to Emperor Jing, was another Huang–Lao official. He believed that the imperial rule should combine Huang–Lao and Confucianism, with punishment supplemented by reward, and coercion mitigated by persuasion.

During the Eastern Han period, the Way of the Celestial Masters movement incorporated Daoist immortality techniques with Huang–Lao thought, and was associated with the Yellow Turban Rebellion and Five Pecks of Rice Rebellion (184 – 215 CE). "Later on, virtually all of the early texts disappeared and knowledge about original Huang-Lao was lost."

Besides these received texts, the imperial library bibliography preserved in the (111 CE) Hanshu ("Han History") lists many books titled with the Yellow Emperor's name. However, with the exception of the medical Huangdi Neijing ("Yellow Emperor's Internal Classic"), all were believed destroyed or lost – until the recent Mawangdui discoveries.

== Mawangdui silk texts ==
The Mawangdui Silk Texts discovered near Changsha in 1973 included four manuscripts that some scholars interpret as primary Huang–Lao texts.

Silk manuscripts found in Mawangdui tomb number three, dated 186 BCE, included two versions of the Daodejing, one of which ("B" or yi 乙) had copies of four texts attached in front. They are titled Jingfa (經法; "Canonical Laws" or "Standards of Regularity"), Shiliujing (十六經; "Sixteen Classics"), also read as Shidajing (十大經; "Ten Great Classics"), Cheng (稱; "Weighing by the Scales"), a collection of aphorisms, and Yuandao (原道; "Origins of the Way"), also the title of Huainanzi chapter 1).

Some Chinese specialists, such as Tang Lan (唐兰), and Yu Mingguang (余明光), interpreted these four manuscripts as the no longer extant Huangdi Sijing (黃帝四經; "Yellow Emperor's Four Classics"), which the Yiwenzhi bibliography of the Hanshu listed as having four sections. Tang's reasons included the Jingfa and Shiliujing titles with jing ("classic; canon") and the frequent references to Huangdi ("Yellow Emperor") in the Shiliujing.

Other specialists, such as Robin D. S. Yates and Edmund Ryden, interpreted the four manuscripts as mutually incompatible texts deriving from diverse philosophical traditions. Paola Carrozza refers to this approach as "different authors, different times, and different places."

Consequently, many of the interpretations of the nature and characteristics of Huang-Lao Taoist thought that have been based on a reading of the Mawangdui manuscripts are debatable, since they are based on the assumption that these texts form an integral whole and are really affiliated with Huang-Lao.

== Philosophical interpretations ==
Sinologists have long disputed the nature of Huang–Lao philosophy. Before the 1973 Mawangdui excavation, some western interpretations of Huang–Lao were fanciful. For instance, Herbert J. Allen proposed that since Han prince Liu Ying practiced both Huang–Lao and Buddhism, Huang–Lao did not mean Huangdi and Laozi, but "Buddhists (literally Yellow-Ancients, perhaps so-called from the colour of their garments)." Following the Mawangdui discoveries, the "Huang-Lao craze" in scholarship has significantly reshaped our understanding of early Daoism.

Tu Wei-Ming describes five common doctrines in the Huang–Lao silk texts. Dao (道; "way; path") is the ultimate basis for fa (法; "model; law") and li (理; "pattern; principle") essential for sagely governance. The true king uses guan (觀; "see; observe; contemplate") or "penetrating insight" to observe the inner workings of the universe, and cheng (稱; "balance; scale; steelyard") enables timely responses to the challenges of the world. Loewe lists another principal idea of the Huang–Lao silk texts: xingming ("forms and names"), which is usually associated with Shen Buhai. Xing ("form or reality") exist first and should be followed by their ming ("name or description").

Our limited exposure to the "lost texts" in the Silk Manuscripts seems to indicate that the thought of Huang-Lao contains several apparently unrelated but actually fully integrated philosophical concepts: a cosmological vision of the Way (tao) as the primordial source of inspiration; an administrative technique (fa-li), based on the principle and model of the naturalness of the Way; a concern for the cultivation of penetrating insight (kuan), so that a king could reign without imposing his limited, self-centered view on the order of things originally manifested in nature; and the necessity of attaining a kind of dynamic balancing (ch'eng) in order to ensure a steady flow, as it were, of the political system as a mirror image of the cosmos.

Tu concludes, "The Huang-Lao doctrine is neither Taoist nor Legalist in the conventional sense, nor is it, strictly speaking, a form of Legalized Taoism. It is rather, a unique system of thought."

John S. Major summarizes Huang–Lao ideology. Dao is the "highest and most primary expression of universal potentiality, order, and potency", and "is expressed in cosmic order, which embraces both the world of nature and the human world." Royal government must conform to natural order, thus the king should practice wuwei ("non-striving" or "taking no action contrary to nature") and use his shenming (神明; "penetrating insight") to "learn all that can be learned about the natural order, so as to make his actions conform with it." Therefore, "The government of the true king is neither sentimental nor vacillating, and neither arbitrary nor domineering," it fully conforms with the "pattern of the Dao as expressed in the natural order, it is balanced, moderate, and irresistibly strong."

Randall P. Peerenboom recaps, "Huang-Lao's Boshu, while advocating a rule of law compatible with an organismic cosmology, is unique in that it supports a natural law grounded in the natural order." Peerenboom characterizes Huang–Lao as "foundational naturalism", meaning naturalism based upon a cosmic natural order that includes both the rendao (人道; "way of humans") and tiandao (天道; "way of Heaven"). Huang–Lao ideology gives "normative priority" to the natural order, with human social order based upon and in harmony with the cosmic order.

Jeffrey L. Richey contrasts Huang–Lao and Mohist theories about the cosmic roots of fa "law". In the Jingfa, fa originates with the impersonal Dao; in the Mozi, it originates with the anthropomorphic Tian ("heaven; god").

Harold D. Roth contends that the original meaning of Chinese Daojia (道家; "Daoism") was Huang–Lao instead of the traditional understanding as Lao-Zhuang (老莊), namely the Laozi and Zhuangzi texts) Daoism. Sima Tan coined the term Daojia in his Shiji summary of the six philosophical jia ("schools").

The Taoist school enables man's numinous essence to be concentrated and unified, to move in unison with the formless, and to provide adequately for the myriad things. As for its methods, it follows the general tendency of the Naturalists (Yinyang chia), picks out the best of the Confucians and Mohists, and adopts the essentials of the Terminologists (Ming-chia) and Legalists. It shifts with the times and changes in response to things; and in establishing customs and in practical applications it is nowhere unsuitable. The general drift of its teaching is simple and easy to hold onto, much is achieved with little effort.

Thus, Huang–Lao Daoism incorporated concepts from five traditions: School of Naturalists, Confucianism, Mohism, School of Names, and Legalism. Roth describes the hallmarks of Huang–Lao: the ruler should use self-transformation "as a technique of government, the emphasis on the precise coordination of the political and cosmic orders by the thus-enlightened ruler, and a syncretic social and political philosophy that borrows relevant ideas from the earlier Legalist and the Confucian schools while retaining the Taoist cosmological context."
