= Randall Peerenboom =

American philosopher (born 1958)

Randall P. Peerenboom
- Born: 1958 (age 67–68)

Education
- Education: Columbia University School of Law (JD), University of Hawaii (MA, PhD), University of Wisconsin - Madison (BA)

Philosophical work
- Era: 21st-century philosophy
- Region: Western philosophy
- Institutions: La Trobe University, Oxford University Law School

Randall Paul Peerenboom (born 1958) is an American legal scholar and Professor of Law at La Trobe University. He is also Associate Fellow at the Center for Socio-Legal Studies, Oxford University Law School. He is known for his work on Chinese law. Peerenboom is a co-founder and former editor-in-chief of The Hague Journal on the Rule of Law (HJRL).

== Views ==
Peerenboom contends that two major historical doctrines have limited the growth of rule of law in China. First, Confucianism, because it emphasizes moral education rather than law to regulate the behavior of the sovereign and the subjects. Second, legalism, because Peerenbloom deems its emphasis on harsh punishment a focus on rule by law rather than rule of law. Peerenbloom writes that this traditions contribute to the personalistic and centralized trends in the history of governance in China.

== Works ==
- Law and Development in Middle-Income Countries: Avoiding the Middle-Income Trap (Randall Peerenboom and Tom Ginsburg eds., Cambridge University Press 2014)
- The Dynamics of Rule of Law in an Era of International and Transnational Governance (Michael Zurn, Andre Noelkamper and Randall Peerenboom eds., Cambridge University Press 2012)
- Judicial Independence in China (Randall Peerenboom ed., Cambridge University Press 2010)
- Regulation in Asia: Pushing Back on Globalization (John Gillespie and Randall Peerenboom eds., Routledge 2009)
- China Modernizes – Threat to the West or Model for the Rest? ( Oxford University Press, 2007)
- Human Rights in Asia: A Comparative Legal Study of Twelve Asian Jurisdictions, France and the U.S. (Randall Peerenboom, Carole Petersen & Albert Chen eds., Routledge, 2006)
- Asian Discourses of Rule of Law: Theories and Implementation of Rule of Law in Twelve Asian Countries, France and the U.S. (ed., Routledge, 2004)
- China’s Long March toward Rule of Law (Cambridge University Press, 2002)
- Doing Business in China (Randall Peerenboom and Thomas Jones eds., Juris Publishing, 2000)
- Lawyers in China: Obstacles to Independence and the Defense of Rights (Lawyers’ Committee on Human Rights, 1998)
- Law and Morality in Ancient China: The Silk Manuscripts of Huang-Lao (SUNY Press, 1993)
- Dispute Resolution in China (Randall Peerenboom, ed., Oxford Foundation for Law, Justice and Society, 2008)
- Is China Trapped in Transition? (Randall Peerenboom, ed. Oxford Foundation for Law, Justice and Society 2007)
- The Regulatory Impact on Doing Business in China (Randall Peerenboom, ed. Oxford Foundation for Law, Justice and Society, 2007)
