= Qunshu zhiyao =

Chinese encyclopedia completed in 631

Pages from Qunshu zhiyao (群書治要) (Asakusa Library)

Qunshu zhiyao (simplified Chinese: 群书治要; traditional Chinese: 群書治要 (also written 羣書治要); Wade–Giles: Ch'ün-shu chih-yao) ("Important matters of governance from all types of literature") is a political encyclopedia from the Tang dynasty, compiled on imperial order by Wei Zheng (580–643), who is also known as the author of the official dynastic history Suishu (Book of Sui). The work is also called Qunshu zhengyao 群書政要 or Qunshu liyao 群書理要.

== Structure and content ==
The originally 50-juan-long Qunshu zhiyao was completed in 631 and approved by Emperor Taizong of Tang. It includes excerpts from:

the Confucian Classics (12 books),
historiographical works (8 books),
the writings of the “masters and philosophers” (7 books).

The selection of texts focuses on the causes of the rise and fall of states and dynasties. Sources range from works of antiquity to texts from the Jin dynasty (265–420).

== Significance ==
The high textual quality of the sources makes the work an important tool for reconstructing the original wording of pre-Tang texts. The sections on the Jin dynasty preserve otherwise lost works, including the so-called Eighteen History Books of Jin (Shibajia jinshi 十八家晉史) – 18 older official histories of the Jin dynasty – as well as political treatises by Huan Tan 桓譚, Cui Shi 崔實, Zhongchang Tong 仲長統, Yuan Huai 袁淮, Jiang Ji 蔣濟, and Huan Fan 桓范.

Zhang Yuanshan f.e. accounts the Qunshu zhiyao among the classical texts relevant to the Zhuangzi text.

== Transmission ==
The original work was lost during the Northern Song dynasty. A copy was imported from Japan in the 18th century for inclusion in the Siku quanshu 四庫全書; in this version, juan 4, 13, and 20 were missing. Another Japanese edition was printed in 1787. In China, the work is also preserved in the collections Sibu congkan 四部叢刊 and Xuxiu Siku quanshu 續修四庫全書.

The Hanyu da zidian (HYDZD) f.e. uses the Sibu congkan 四部丛刊 photographic reproduction of a Japanese print of the 7th year of the Tenmei era (1787).

Liu Xicheng has recently completed the first full English translation of the work ("The Governing Principles of Ancient China").

== Bibliography ==
- Article “Qunshu zhiyao” 群书治要, in: Li Xueqin, Lü Wenyu (eds.): Siku da cidian 四庫大辭典, vol. 2, 1997a. Changchun: Jilin daxue chubanshe 1996.
