= Herrlee G. Creel =

American sinologist and philosopher (1905–1994)

- Born: January 19, 1905; Chicago, Illinois, U.S.
- Died: June 1, 1994 (aged 89); Palos Park, Illinois, U.S.
- Education: University of Chicago (PhB, MA, PhD)
- Scientific career
- Fields: Sinology
- Workplaces: University of Chicago
- Thesis: Sinism: A Study of the Evolution of the Chinese World-view (1929)

Chinese name
- Traditional Chinese: 顧理雅
- Simplified Chinese: 顾理雅
Transcriptions
Standard Mandarin
- Hanyu Pinyin: Gù Lǐyǎ
- Gwoyeu Romatzyh: Guh Liiyea
- Wade–Giles: Ku^{4} Li^{3}-ya^{3}

Herrlee Glessner Creel (January 19, 1905 – June 1, 1994) was an American sinologist and philosopher who specialized in Chinese philosophy and Chinese history. He was a professor of Chinese at the University of Chicago for nearly 40 years. Creel was known for his early work on Confucius, the history of Chinese thought, and his translation of Shen Buhai.

== Early years ==
Herrlee G. Creel was born on January 19, 1905, in Chicago, Illinois, taking up journalism after high school. He attended the University of Chicago as an undergraduate, studying in philosophy and the history of religion. He graduated with a Ph.B. degree in 1926. He became interested in the teachings of Confucius after graduation, studying Chinese with a Chinese student. He continued on at Chicago as a graduate student studying Chinese philosophy, earning an M.A. in 1927, followed by a Ph.D. in 1929 with a dissertation entitled "Sinism: A Study of the Evolution of the Chinese World-view".

He began his postdoctoral career as an assistant professor of psychology at Lombard College from 1929 to 1930. He was awarded fellowships by the American Council of Learned Societies (1930–1933), the Harvard-Yenching Institute (1931–1935) and the Rockefeller Foundation (1936, 1945 –1946). With the support of Harvard-Yenching he visited China from 1932-1935 to study inscriptions with the Chinese scholar Liu Jie (1901-1977). In 1936 he accepted a post at the University of Chicago, where he was an instructor in Chinese history and language until he was appointed assistant professor of early Chinese literature and institutions in 1937.

Creel was one of the founders of the university's Far Eastern studies program in the 1930s and had a major role in building its Far Eastern Library. He ordered some 5,000 books a year from dealers in China. In 1939, with support from the Rockefeller Foundation, he returned to China, then in the grips of the Second Sino-Japanese War, with the city of Beiping (Beijing) occupied by the Japanese Army. He bought more than 75,000 volumes for the library, especially those dealing with the pre-modern period.

Creel was promoted to the rank of associate professor in 1941 and full Professor in 1949. He served as a Lieutenant Colonel of military intelligence in the United States Army from 1943 to 1945 during the Second World War. He remained as a professor until 1964, becoming the Martin A. Ryerson Distinguished Service Professor of Chinese History until 1974, when he published his Shen Pu-Hai.

== Societies and publishing ==
Creel was a member of the Committee on Chinese Studies of the American Council of Learned Societies, a member of its Committee on Far Eastern Studies, and the President of the American Oriental Society. He was also a member of the Association for Asian Studies as well as a member of the American Philosophical Society.

The most influential of Creel’s books include The Birth of China (1936), the first detailed account of the significance of the archaeological excavations at Anyang, which quickly attracted global interest; Studies in Early Chinese Culture (1937) which was an influential collection of monographic essays; Literary Chinese by the Inductive Method, vols. I–III (1938–52), a groundbreaking and controversial attempt to teach literary Chinese through carefully glossed excerpts of standard classical texts; Newspaper Chinese by the Inductive Method (1943), an effort to apply identical pedagogical techniques to the analysis of Chinese newspapers; Confucius, the Man and the Myth (1949), a critical analysis of the philosopher Confucius; Chinese Thought from Confucius to Mao Tse-tung (1953), a survey of Chinese thought; The Origins of Statecraft in China, Vol. 1: The Western Chou Empire (University of Chicago Press, 1970), a judicial account of the polity of the Western Zhou dynasty; What is Taoism? and Other Studies in Chinese Cultural History (University of Chicago Press, 1970) and Shen Pu-hai: A Chinese Political Philosophy of the Fourth Century B.C. (1974), a monograph on Shen Buhai, an early Chinese specialist in administrative technique.

== Style and legacy ==
Creel was especially known for Confucius: The Man and the Myth (1949), which argued that Confucius had been misunderstood because legend had obscured the facts of his life and his ideas. Creel held that Confucius was a reformer and an individualist, as well as a democratic and revolutionary teacher.

From the start of his career in the 1930s, Creel was an outspoken proponent of the theory that Chinese characters are inherently ideographic in nature. He was opposed by sinologists Peter A. Boodberg and Paul Pelliot, who believed that phonetic principles played a large role in the early history of Chinese characters. The scholar John DeFrancis objected to Creel's position, which he called "the ideographic myth." Creel in the 1930s set out to correct the widespread idea that a phonological system of writing, such as an alphabet, which represents sounds, was superior to an ideographic one, such as Chinese. The debate has continued many decades later without either side being able to discredit the other.

Creel's language textbooks were controversial because they introduced students to Chinese using classical texts, not the modern language.

Creel died at his home in Palos Park, Illinois, after a long illness, on June 1, 1994, at the age of 89.

== Notes ==
Creel references the early Yantielun Discourses on Salt and Iron translation of Esson M. Gale; such references are uninterpretable without Gale, as it was not a full translation.

== Selected works ==
- Creel, H. G. (1936). The Birth of China. London: Jonathan Cape. Rpt. New York: John Day, 1937; New York: Frederick Ungar: 1954.
- ——— (1937). Studies in Early Chinese Culture: First Series. Baltimore: Waverly Press.
- ——— (1936). "On the Nature of Chinese Ideography". T'oung Pao. 32 (1): 85–161. doi:10.1163/156853236X00056.
- ——— (1938–52). Literary Chinese by the Inductive Method, 3 vols. Chicago: University of Chicago Press.
- ——— (1949). Confucius, the Man and the Myth. New York: John Day. Rpt. under title: Confucius and the Chinese Way, New York: Harper, 1960.
- ——— (1953). Chinese Thought from Confucius to Mao Tse-tung. Chicago: University of Chicago Press.
- ——— (1970). What is Taoism? and Other Studies in Cultural History. Chicago: University of Chicago Press.
- ——— (1970). The Origins of Statecraft in China, vol. 1. Chicago: University of Chicago Press.
- ——— (1974). Shen Pu-hai. Chicago, London: The University of Chicago Press.

== Sources ==
- Roy, David T. (1994). "Obituary: Herrlee Glessner Creel (1905-1994)". Journal of Asian Studies. 53 (4): 1356–1357. doi:10.1017/S0021911800045526. JSTOR 2059336.
- ——— (1996). "Herrlee Glessner Creel (19 January 1905 – 1 June 1994)". Proceedings of the American Philosophical Society. 140 (1): 94–97. JSTOR 987279.
- Honey, David B. (2001). Incense at the Altar: Pioneering Sinologists and the Development of Classical Chinese Philology. American Oriental Series 86. New Haven, Connecticut: American Oriental Society. ISBN 0-940490-16-1.
- Pines, Yuri (2024). Dao Companion to China's fa Tradition. Hebrew University of Jerusalem: Springer. ISBN 9789048129270.
- Roy, David Tod; Tsien, Tsuen-hsuin (1978). Ancient China: Studies in Early Civilization. Hong Kong: Chinese University Press. ISBN 9622011446.. A festschrift in Creel's honor.
- Tsien, Tsuen-hsuin (2011). Collected writings on Chinese culture. Hong Kong: Chinese University Press. ISBN 978-962-996-422-1.
- Saxon, Wolfgang (June 4, 1994). "Dr. Herrlee G. Creel, 89 (Obituary)". New York Times.
