= Shen Dao =

Chinese legalist theoretician (c. 350–c. 275 BC)

- 慎到
- Born: c. 350 BC
- Died: c. 275 BC

Philosophical work
- Era: Ancient philosophy
- Region: Chinese philosophy
- School: Legalism, Huang-Lao
- Main interests: Fa (concept), Dao, Naturalism, wu wei, Shi (power, position, authority)
- Notable ideas: Early concepts of Dao, "metaphysical anti-knowledge stoicism"

Shen Dao
- Chinese: 慎到
Transcriptions
Standard Mandarin
- Hanyu Pinyin: Shèn Dào
- Gwoyeu Romatzyh: Shenn Daw
- Wade–Giles: Shen^{4} Tao^{4}
- IPA: [ʂə̂n tâʊ]
Yue: Cantonese
- Yale Romanization: Sahn dou
- Jyutping: San^{6} Dou^{3}
Southern Min
- Tâi-lô: Sīn Tàu
Middle Chinese
- Middle Chinese: dʑìn tàw
Old Chinese
- Baxter–Sagart (2014): *[d]i[n]-s tˤaw[k]-s

Alternative Chinese name
- Chinese: 慎子
- Literal meaning: "Master Shen"
Transcriptions
Standard Mandarin
- Hanyu Pinyin: Shènzǐ
- Gwoyeu Romatzyh: Shenntzyy
- Wade–Giles: Shen^{4}-tzu^{3}
Yue: Cantonese
- Yale Romanization: Sahn-jí
- Jyutping: San^{6}-zi^{2}
Southern Min
- Tâi-lô: Sīn-tsú
Middle Chinese
- Middle Chinese: dʑìn-tsí
Old Chinese
- Baxter–Sagart (2014): *[d]i[n]-s tsəʔ

Shen Dao (c. 360 – c. 285 BC), or (c. 395 – c. 315 BC), was an early-mid Warring states period Chinese philosopher and writer. Noteworthy as a predecessor influencing both Han Fei and Daoism, his remaining fragments are the most substantial of any Jixia Academy scholar. In connection with the flourishing academy, he may have been well known, if not a center of political discussions in his time. With references in the Zhuangzi, Xunzi, Han Feizi, and Huangdi Sijing (unnamed), his continued reference in the late Lushi Chunqiu and Huainanzi 'indicate' importance in early Chinese political philosophy, retaining some individual significance into the early Han dynasty. He has often been argued to influence the Guanzi.

As introduced by Feng Youlan, Shen Dao was early remembered modernly for his influence on the Han Feizi with regards the concept of shi (勢; 'power', 'potential', circumstantial advantage or authority), most notably as cited in Chapter 40's "Objection to Positional Power” (Nan shi 難勢), and is "perhaps what Shen Dao is most famous for." Shen Dao's "power" however is more concerned with "utilizing external assistance" to achieve goals, similar to Xunzi's gentleman, and less concerned with its concentration in any one official, like the Han Feizi. Though defended by the Han Feizi, it sees Shen Dao as having a more naturalistic conception of power compared with "riding the wind" (like a dragon, boat or arrow), as also depicted in the Zhuangzi. The Han Feizi advocates "power founded by men".

Sima Qian discusses Shen Dao amongst the Jixia academy scholars, taking him as rooted in Huang-Lao (Daoism). Later classified by the Confucian archivists as Legalist together with others from the Han Feizi, he shares some comparable early administrative ideas with them. He was likely the most broadly well known of them earlier in the Warring States period, but was less likely familiar with Shang Yang as a statesman.

Xun Kuang criticized Shen Buhai as more focused on power, and Shen Dao as "obsessed by fa." Most of Shen Dao's work would appear to have concerned fa, a concept including administrative standards, methods and laws. He advocated that reward and punishment be based in fa rather than the ruler's judgements. Advocating their distribution through both laws and impartial administrative mechanisms, Sinologist Goldin compared him with administrator Shen Buhai, but still bases the appointment of tasks and officials in the ruler's discretion.

Making some discussion of law, in his time, Shen Dao argued the value of laws that are not good (不善) as still having value over no laws. Bad laws are taken as preventing resentment in the distribution of goods and properties. Included in the Qunshu Zhiyao, that "Even if a law is not good, it is still better than having no law" becomes perhaps Shen Dao's most famous statement (outside positional power, after Han Fei). But Shen Dao did prefer good laws, advocating that punishment and reward be proportionate rather than extreme.

== Translation ==
A critical reconstruction of the lost Shenzi was made by Paul Thompson, published in 1979 as The Shen Tzu Fragments. A complete modern Chinese vernacular (baihua) translation and commentary was published in Guiyang by the Guizhou Renmin Chubanshe in 1996, titled Shenzi, Yinwenzi, Gongsun longzi quanyi (慎子、尹文子、公孫龍子全譯), translated by Gao Liushui (高流水) and Lin Hengsen (林恒森).

With a subsequent prior translation by Emerson (2013), Eirik Lang Harris has since published a complete translation, including broader fragments discussing him, in 2016. Thompson was more concerned with whether the fragments were legitimate and credibly attributable to Shen Dao. In this regard, Harris still considered Thomspon the most thorough examination of Shen Dao's primary fragments, and credibly attributable to Shen Dao.

== Textual transmission ==
The Shiji states that the Shenzi was twelve essays. The Han dynasty's Treatise on Literature in the Book of Han listed the Shenzi as rendered in forty-two chapters, which is considered the most complete form of the text.

The Shenzi was available until the fall of the Tang dynasty, though not commonly in its original edition; the Book of Sui, Old & New Book of Tang listed ten volume editions. The older 42 essay edition was lost between the Tang to Song Dynasties.

From the late 1500s onwards, a number of one chapter Shenzi texts were produced deriving from the older fragments and encyclopedia. Despite the recovery of additional manuscripts, the most thorough remaining source on Shen Dao is the Tang's Qunshu zhiyao political encyclopedia.

Xun Kuang considered Shen's style grandiose.

== Shanghai manuscripts ==
In 2007, the Shanghai Museum published a collection of texts written on bamboo slips from the state of Chu dating to the Warring States period, including six bamboo slips with sayings of Shenzi. They are titled "Shenzi Speaks of Reverence and Frugality" (Shenzi Yue Gong Jian 慎子曰恭儉), or SZYGJ, based on a title on the third fragment.

Shenzi Speaks refers to Master Shen, and discusses concepts like positional power and administrative methods as to connect them to Shenzi. But they also include Confucian concepts, and it is not positive they belong to the exact same tradition.

Reverence and Frugality are "among the fey key terms" that are undisputed in the document. Even with disputation of other terms, the SZYGJ would "have Confucian elements", because reverence and frugality appear together in the Book of Rites (Liji), Mencius and Xunzi, though also the Guanzi.

The Liji teaches reverence and frugality alongside solemness and respectfulness. Reverence is said to be close to li ritual propriety. Reverence and frugality describe an ideal gracious ruler of Mencius; a frugal ruler will not need to seize wealth, and a reverent ruler will not humiliate his subjects. Alongside reverence and frugality, the ideal official of Xunzi is said to be “earnest”, “respectful”, “loyal”, and “trustworthy”.

However, one rendering of the fragmentary SZYGJ refers more to tranquility and emptiness, rather than sincerity, loyalty and trustworthiness. A conservative estimation would place them as later syncretists still in the heyday of Shen Dao's fame, but would also magnify the scope of Shen Dao's authority, still opening with reference to Shenzi himself.

=== Public government ===
Professor Rory O'Neill argues for compatibility between the Shenzi fragments and SZYGJ, taking both as espousing a "public" (gong 公) government, or "fair" government as translated by Masayuki Sato. There is only "tension" or a "barrier" to reading them together within later traditional frameworks of "Legalism" and "Confucianism", taking the later text as more moral.

The late Han Feizi is concerned with competing interests of ministers and the sovereign, identified with gong more as "Lord" than a modern idea of the public. Recalling the work Erica Brindley (2013), the Han Feizi's conception is arguably not reflective of the broader Warring States, or even its predecessor Shen Dao.

Though it can be argued that the SZYGJ's "proportionate distribution" is likely more concerned with paying ministers, it says that gain should be distributed for [the benefit of] of "society", at least "acting" for the people. Its conception of gong is arguably wider than that of the Lord in the Han Feizi, at least closer to the people as "the public".

If there is gain, it should be used for [the benefit of] society; divide proportionately and distribute widely; rely upon de (“potency” or “virtue”) and yi (“righteousness”). SZYGJ #4. In practical affairs today, acting for the people is the utmost ren. (“humaneness”) SZYGJ #6

Harris objects to an identical interpretation for the earlier Shen Dao, because Shen Dao says that the position of Emperor was set up to serve the state, and so calls Shen Dao a "state consequentialist." Shen Dao doesn't say the Emperor was set up to serve the people, like a Confucian. Though Shen Dao emphasizes that the state doesn't exist to serve the desires of the Emperor, laws and methods for apportioning goods are set up to prevent resentment rather than because they lead to more equal distribution.

Shen Dao expresses indifference towards the people. O'Neil argues that he aims to avoid overburdening the government, as only leading to neglect. The proportionate distribution of goods he advocates is arguably still concerned with their well-being and satisfaction, and not always just for political legitimacy. The public - and interests of state and sovereign - are identified with the people, even supposing Shen Dao does not (or cannot afford to) "care" about them.

== Ritual and fa ==
While Shen Dao's fragments proper discuss concepts of "virtue" (de) and ritual, Sinologist Harris does not see them as demonstrating an inherent connection to morality, or ideologically, therefore to Confucianism specifically. Professor Rory O’Neill sees the "potency" (de) of Shen Dao's ruler as a "latent power akin to the bounty of the sky and earth", denoting benefit or gratitude for benefit. O’Neill compares its governmental practice to the “two handles” of reward and punishment in the later Han Feizi, except that while punishments are regulated by fa administrative methods, reward (or de as benefit) in the court is still regulated more by ritual (as well, Shen Dao advocates against extremism in reward and punishment.).

Shen Dao says: while fa (laws and methods) distribute wealth and punishments, ritual regulates virtue and what is within [(the ruler's) household]. Ritual maintains inner court benefits as a "public" rather than private mode of governance. Virtue as benevolence (or benefit) more specifically is "tempered" (or restrained) by ritual, with its exercise requiring "an abstract and unbiased method" parallel to (fa) laws and methods as "determining punishments and wealth distribution". Subsequently, Shen Dao's successors, the Confucian Xunzi and the Guanzi, discuss fa alongside li ritual. Only that Xunzi places the higher priority on convention, historical tradition, and the gentleman.

== Western dating ==
Though not his focus, Herrlee G. Creel (1974) considered Shen Dao a younger contemporary of Shen Buhai. A general round dating of circa 350-275 bce used in the west derives from that theorized by the famed early modern scholar Ch'ien Mu. Translator Thomphson (1979) placed him a decade earlier, 360-285 bce. Translator Harris' (2016) still used Thompson's dating. A circa 350 BCE dating is essentially the same as placing his birth at the beginning of the middle Warring States period.

Usually referred to as "Shenzi" (慎子 'Master Shen') for his writings, very little is known of Shen Dao's life, as his historical records are brief. David R. Knechtges (2014) placed Shen Dao, an itinerant philosopher from the state of Zhao, about 350 BC, traveling to the city of Linzi (modern Zibo in Shandong) in 300 BC to become a member of the Jixia Academy, probably leaving Linzi after its capture by the state of Yan in 285 BC before his death a decade later in 275.

Harris only recalls the brief references of the Xunzi and Sima Qian's Shiji. The Shiji places him as a native of the Zhao state alongside his Jixia Academy successor Xun Kuang (of the Xunzi), but comments little on him or his Jixia compatriots except to assign him as having studied Huang-Lao (Yellow Emperor and Laozi) and Dao-de (The Way and its virtue)). Depicted as debating others of the Jixia academy, he is not known to have held any political or bureaucratic appointment.

Although Harris does not engage in a dating argument, he relates political naturalism, and an interest in the natural world, as comparable to figures spanning Laozi to Shen Dao's Jixia successor Xun Kuang. Sinologist Hansen viewed Shen Dao's morally neutral naturalism as a development of the type earlier seen in Mencius (371–c.289 BCE), but there is also room for comparison with the earlier Mohists.

O'Neil argues "publicness" (gong 公) as a central concept in the Shenzi fragments proper. One issue is that there is "no satisfactory widely used translation" of the term "in the context of Warring States political philosophy." Gong as “imbued with positive, moral meanings associated with impartiality and unity", and a universal Way,(Brindley 2013: 5) is associated with the mid to late Warring States period (c. 350–221 BCE), following into the Xunzi as “avoidance of prejudice”,(Hutton 2014:15, n. 24) and the Han Feizi, contrasting “the general interests of the sovereign” and “the personal interests of the ministers”.(Goldin 2005: 61)

== Earlier dating ==
Chinese sources can commonly be seen date Shen Dao to 395-315 BCE, several decades earlier than in the west. Arguably, Shen Dao is less technically complex than Shen Buhai, let alone Xunzi in the later Warring States period. Philosophically, he retains antiquated fatalistic ideas, with view of men as selfish that aligns more with early Warring States thinkers like Shen Buhai and Shang Yang than Xunzi's view of men as "bad" or "evil". His view of Heaven as lacking concern for man aligns with Laozi, but not Confucius, Mencius, or the Mohists.

With discovery of the Mawangdui silk texts, and Shen Dao content contained in the Huangdi Sijing, Chinese scholars again advocated the traditional idea of an early "Daoistic" Huang-Lao current influencing later thinkers, different from Daoism as later understood. Tang Lan (1975) related Shen Buhai with a theorized emergence of a 400bc Huang-Lao school; the similarly 'Daoistic' Shen Dao, then, is slightly younger contemporary of Shen Buhai.

Following discovery of the Guodian Chu slips, Alan Chan of the Stanford Encyclopedia of Laozi (2025) argues that "bodies of sayings attributed to Laozi were committed to writing probably from the second half of the fifth century B.C.E." (450) Shen Dao has ideas that can be compared with Laozi, but is not an advanced development of Laozi.

If Tang's theory is taken to depend on early dating for the Huang-Lao boshu, the west argues a later dating for most of it. Its text Dao the Origin (Dao Yuan) resembles the Tao te Ching, but has received little dating commentary. German Sinologists Dieter Kuhn and Helga Stahl place it in the third century BCE without comment.

== Proto-Daoism ==
Making use of the term "Dao" without cosmological or metaphysical reference, the Shenzi serves as noteworthy precursor to both Daoism and Han Fei. Posthumously, he is also sometimes classified as Taoist.

Sinologist Hansen (of the Stanford Encyclopedia of Daoism) believed that Shen Dao might have preceded completion of the Tao Te Ching (Laozi), serving as a relevant background for its development. But Hansen did not emphasize it. Rather, even if it was finished, Shen Dao still represents a low level of Daoist development compared to either Laozi or the Zhuangzi. So, Shen Dao is still a good theoretical reference for what some Daoist-leaning thinkers might have looked like before completion of those texts.

Nonetheless, Hansen took Shen Dao as a beginning of Daoist theory, or mature Daoism. Hansen viewed Shen Dao's morally neutral naturalism as a development of the type of thinking seen in Mencius and early Mohists. Later Mohists moved away from an emphasis on heaven or nature. Though still naturalist, Shen Dao begins the move toward emphasizing a concept of Dao or Way as a course of action, with the Zhuangzi ultimately abandoning heaven as authoritative in favor of the Great Dao.

=== Shen Dao and Laozi ===
Less metaphysical in practice, and more concerned with the practical human world than the "inner workings of heaven and earth", translator Harris took Shen Dao's 'naturalism' as developing in the direction of the Tao te Ching and Huang-Lao typified texts. Not focusing on the idea of Dao in a cosmic sense in his fragments, Shen Dao nonetheless espouses a "Way (Dao) of Heaven."

Sinologist Tao Jiang (2016) characterizes passage (Shenzi 1–6) as a "broadly Laoist cosmology", with Shen Dao's sage "echoing" Laozi's relationship between heaven and humanity, unconcerned with human affairs. While uncaring, humanity suffers by its own doing, rather than the will of heaven or the sage, and can take advantage of natural affairs, e.g. drawing from the earth by felling trees and cutting grass (Shenzi 3).

Whichever came first, Shen Dao and Laozi are at least comparable, including concepts of rule by a wu wei semi-inactive ruler, as illustrated by translator Emerson. Xun Kuang also later "stresses the indifference of Heaven and Earth to human concerns." Emerson notes however, "In chapter 60 of Laozi it is said that when the Empire follows Dao, the spirits 鬼神 do not harm men, nor does the Sage harm men."

Heaven is not humane: it treats the myriad creatures as straw dogs. The sage is not humane: he treats the people as straw dogs. Laozi Ch.5

It is said that the Way of Heaven benefits and does not harm.— Laozi 81

Heaven has light and does not care that men are in darkness; Earth is fruitful, and does not care that men are impoverished; the sage (聖) has virtue (德) and does not care that men are imperiled... Although Heaven does not care that men are in darkness, if they open their doors and windows, they will assuredly get light for themselves; but Heaven does nothing (無事). Shenzi 1-2, Emerson

The Sage in high position does not harm (不害) men, though he cannot keep men from harming each other. It is the people themselves who eliminate the harm. Shenzi 5, Emerson

=== Zhuangism ===
Although the Han Feizi would generally be considered authoritarian, figures like Shen Dao were not necessarily more authoritarian for their time. He advocates that the realm be literally modeled (fa) off the natural world, relying on laws and administrative machinery (fa) to impartially determine rewards and punishments, rather than the ruler deciding them himself.

Compared with the "mature Daoism" of the Zhuangzi, Hansen and Harris considered Shen Dao more fatalist. But, as summarized by the Zhuangzi, it is a fatalism more in the sense of believing that things cannot necessarily be changed before their time. Not that the way things are is necessarily "right."

The Zhuangzi uses the term "the Great Clod" as a term for the "sum total of reality", but appears to quote Shen Dao when it says: "A clod of earth does not err with regard to the Tao." Taking his "fundamental" principle as the "equality of all things", as opposed to the egoist Yang Zhu, the Zhuangzi characterizes Shen Dao as impartial and lacking selfishness, his great way embracing all things, so that Wang Fuzhi speculated its chapter on "Seeing Things as Equal" was actually written by Shen Dao.

=== Relying on circumstances (Shi) ===
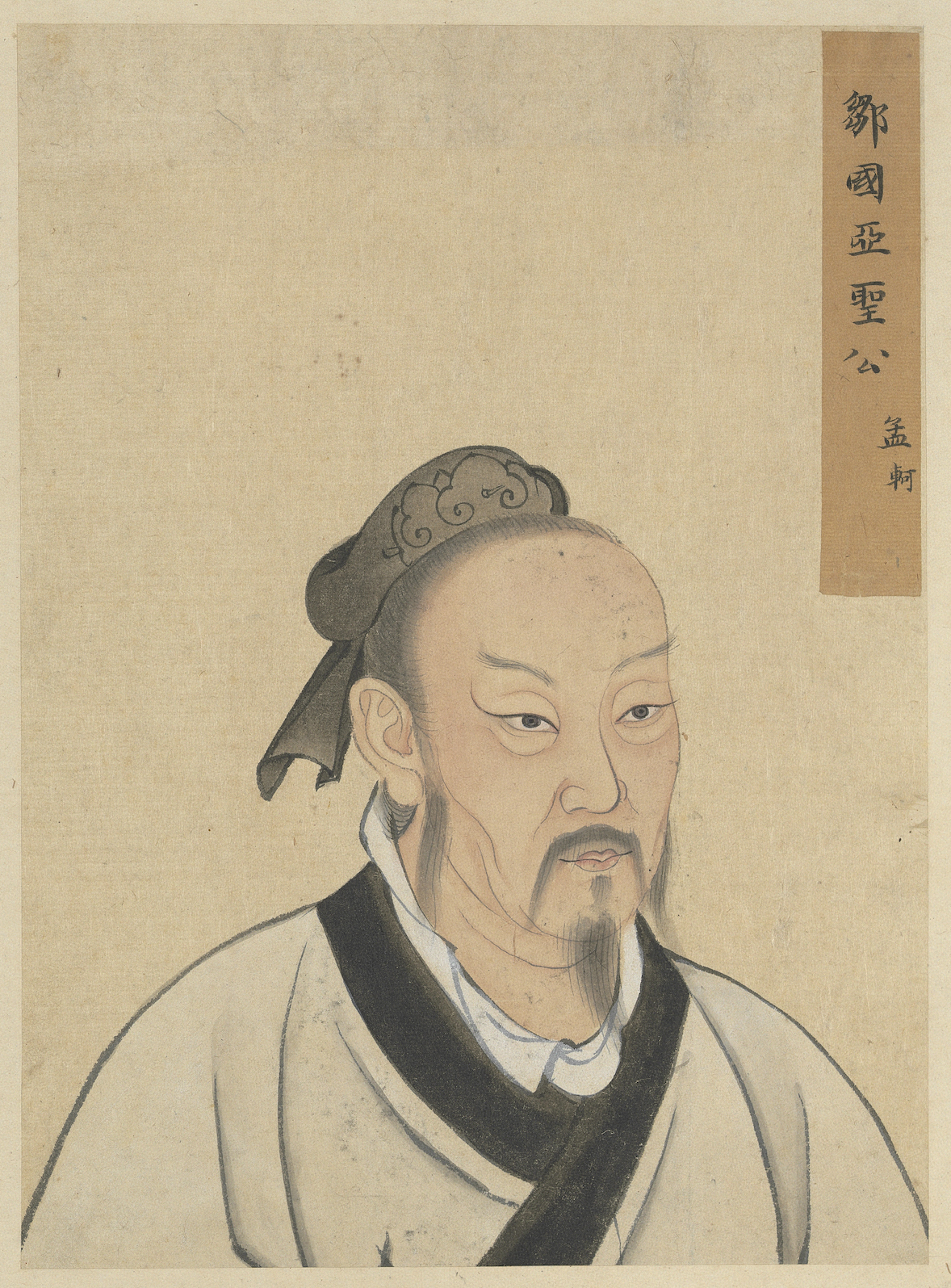
The people of Qi have a saying – "A man may have wisdom and discernment, but that is not like embracing the favourable opportunity. A man may have instruments of husbandry, but that is not like waiting for the farming seasons." Mencius

Shi is a not historically simply a Legalist or Totalitarian idea: before Han Fei, Mencius also discusses Shi. Arguably, it includes ideas that can traced back to philosophical founders like Confucius and Mozi. In particular, Léon Vandermeersch takes the idea of preeminence or sovereignty, as found in the Han Feizi's Chapter 40 discussion of Shi and Shen Dao (Shenzi), as already present in Mohism, and indeed as one of the most characteristic Chinese conceptions of sovereignty, developing an idea of power as established by man.

"Preeminence is a concept that covers many modalities. If we must rely on nature for preeminence, it is useless to discuss it; the preeminence I want to speak of is that which is founded by men." Han Feizi Ch.40

In contrast to Han Fei and the Later Mohists, Sinologist Hansen views the earlier Shen Dao as having only just begun to move away from an emphasis on heaven, or nature, towards a concept of Dao the Way. As opposed to Han Fei, Shen Dao's fragments still approve of Ways relying on nature, including illustrations of relying on water, which translator Harris takes as "reminding us" that the natural world has recognizable "qualities and patterns", whose actions can be predicted once understood.

A cauldron from the state of Yan weighs several tons, but if it is loaded in a boat from the state of Wu, then it can be transported. What it relies upon is the Way of flotation. Shen Dao 118, Harris.

Although Han Fei discusses Shen Dao in relation to power, Shen Dao's earlier conception of shi was not a naked concept of power. In contrast to Han Fei's "power founded by men", Shen Dao's power was still one based in "relying on circumstances", such as the powers of nature, which corresponds with the Zhuangzi's discussion of him. Both discussions of him use the same kind of imagery of being "tossed" or "driven" by the wind.

Shen Dao discarded knowledge and renounced the self; he followed the inevitable and was indifferent to things... shifting and slippery, he changed about with circumstances. He went where he was pushed and followed where he was led, like a whirling gale, like a feather tossed in the wind. (Zhuangzi)

The flying dragon rides on the clouds and the rising serpent strolls through the mists; but when the clouds and the mists disperse, the dragon and the serpent become the same as the earthworm and the large-winged black ant, because they have lost what they rested on... If the bow is weak, but the arrow flies high, it means that it is driven up by the wind.(Han Feizi ch.40)

First quoted in Chapter 36, Chapter 40's discussion of Shen Dao also quotes a halberd-and-shield parable from the Zhuangzi.

A shield that cannot be pierced, and a lance that can pierce anything cannot coexist. If the worthy’s positional power cannot be stopped, while the way of positional power is that it can stop everything... that is a shield-and-lance fallacy.

== Morality ==
Benjamin I. Schwartz characterized Shen Dao's convictions as Daoisticly indifferent. Likening him to the 'inert passive clod' described in the last chapters of the Zhuangzi, Schwartz takes him as seeing the impersonal structures of political authority and human society as expressions of the spontaneous Dao in human civilization. Shen Dao rejects individual judgment, moral agents, sages, and, like other figures of the fa school, the "subjective intentionality of noble men." By contrast, Han Fei does not completely disregard the role of great men.

Schwarz speculated that Shen Dao's philosophy similarly involves a ruler free from the turbulence of emotion or moral responsibility. However, though not favored by translator Harris, Shen Dao has still modernly been argued to be at least "not fully untethered from a moral grounding", with the concept of Dao itself typically implying a morally grounded Way, even if Shen Dao's fragments do not fill in all the blanks. Shen Dao does not argue that a ruler should always take actions which benefit the state order or people. But he does argue that goods like an orderly state will benefit the people, if the ruler desires such things.

Yuri Pines (Stanford Encyclopedia) does not consider the Han Feizi's discussion of Shen Dao (chapter 40) itself amoral; catering to average rulers, Han Fei's discussion does not cater to "moral paragons", but it does not cater to "monstrous tyrants" either. Quoting from the Guanzi:

The sage ruler relies on laws, not on personal wisdom; on methods and not on persuasions; on impartiality and not on selfishness; on the great Way and not on trivial matters. Then, he may be at ease and All-under-Heaven will be governed well. (Guanzi 45, “Relying on law”; cf. Ricket 1998: 144)

== Book of Lord Shang ==
Shen Dao might have influenced chapter 24 of the Book of Lord Shang, though there is not enough evidence to demonstrate its discussion of shi came from him, or at least directly from him. Making use of the later term shu methods (sometimes translated technique), it is also a notable later chapter that can be related with later developments of the tradition of Shen Buhai, though it is "less obvious" whether it actually reflects either's influence, as shu technique is a later term than Shen Buhai.

Although not all of the chapter would be reflective of Shen Dao, it will be discussed here for background. Like a number of other chapters of the Book of Lord Shang, it emphasizes directing the people to agriculture and warfare. But it notably lacks discussion of reward and punishment, and is notably "concerned exclusively with the maintenance of officials", as more the domain of Shen Buhai.

He who attained the utmost power [of authority] does not impeach officials, yet they are clean; he arrays the methods, and every matter is [performed] appropriately. He who comprehends methods... separates their [the officials’] powers.

The chapter is more metaphorical than other chapters. It doesn't use shi in exactly the same way as Shen Dao, since it uses it in reference to the shi power of both the rulers and officials, whereas Shen Dao's fragments are only concerned with the shi of the ruler.

A floating seed of the p'eng plant, meeting a whirlwind, may be carried a thousand li, because it rides on the power (shi) of the wind. If, in measuring an abyss, you know that it is a thousand fathoms deep, it is owing to the figures which you find by dropping a string. By depending on the power (shi) of a thing, you will reach a point, however, distant it may be, and by keeping the proper figures, you will find out the depth, however deep it may be. Duyvendak, Book of Lord Shang Ch.24

== Relation with Confucianism ==
Although the Zhuangzi takes Shen Dao as rejecting sages and lacking in "standards of conduct", he was otherwise content to leave questions of li (rites) to custom. Mencius advocated that Emperor Shun would run away with his father if he had committed murder, rather than see him arrested. Like Mencius, Shen Dao still upheld filial piety even if the parents are bad, but instead suggests that parents can be reproached if it might save them from disaster. Not considering Confucian values like filial piety sufficient for governing the state, Shen Dao advocates the ruler encourage faith in rules by acting according to rules, and not abandon the throne to help murderous family members escape.

Taking his opponents as "beclouded" by particular aspects of the Way, Xun Kuang criticizes Shen Dao in particular as obsessed with the emulation of models (fa) rather than the employment of worthy men, and that he does not necessarily decide on one model as correct. Shen Dao was more concerned that there be laws than with their particulars. Xun Kuang is of the opinion that his laws (or models) lack 'proper foundations', and will not be successful in ordering the state. But Xun Kuang doesn't oppose him just for advocating fa models or laws. Xun Kuang also discusses fa. Rather than law itself, Xun Kuang opposes litigation and paradoxes, as found in the school of names.

== Statecraft ==
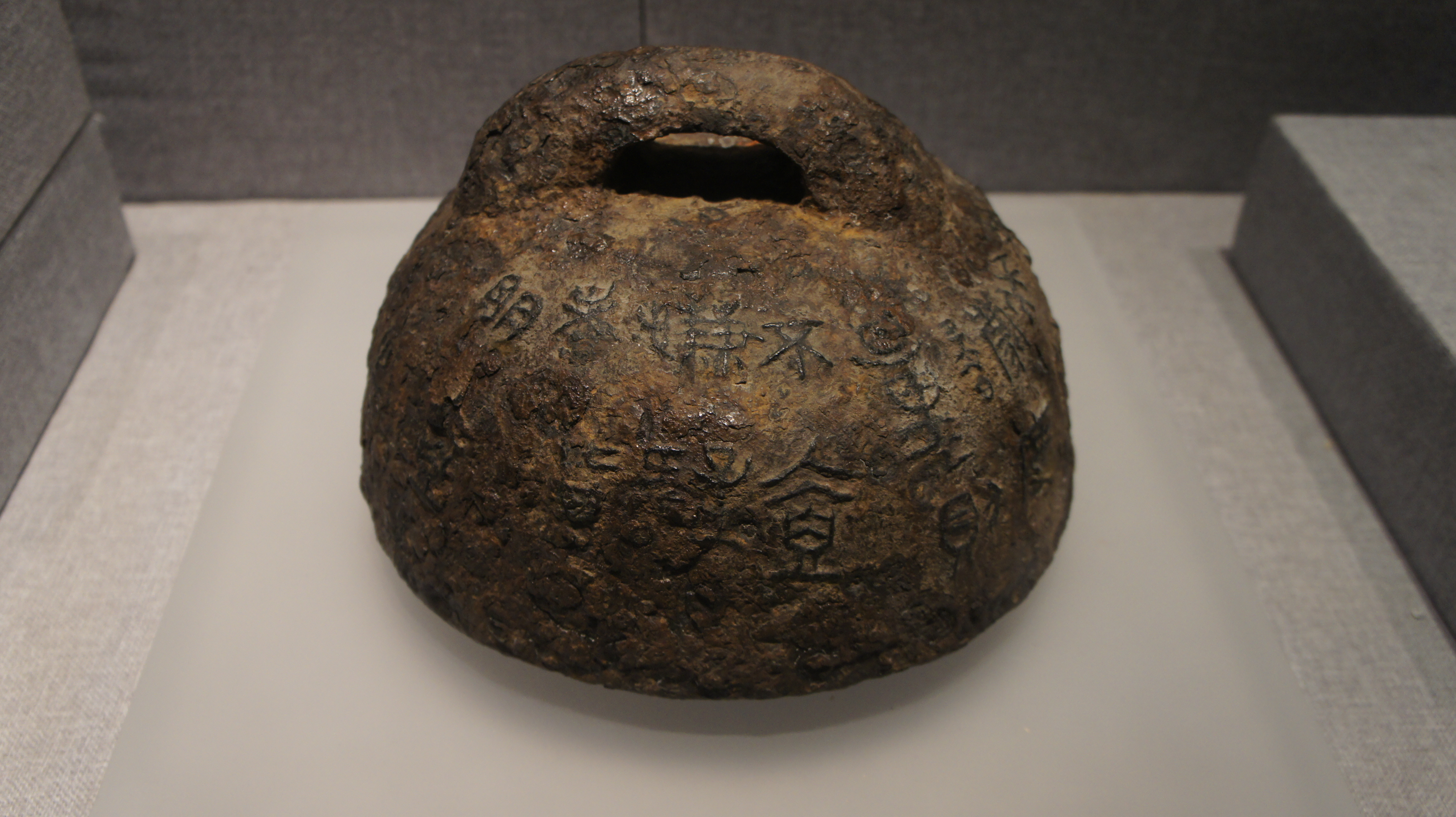
Iron weight dated from 221 BC with 41 inscriptions written in seal script about standardizing weights and measures during the 1st year of Qin dynasty Where there is a scale, people cannot deceive others about weight; where there is a ruler, people cannot deceive others about length; and where there is Fa, people cannot deceive others about one's words and deeds. Shen Dao

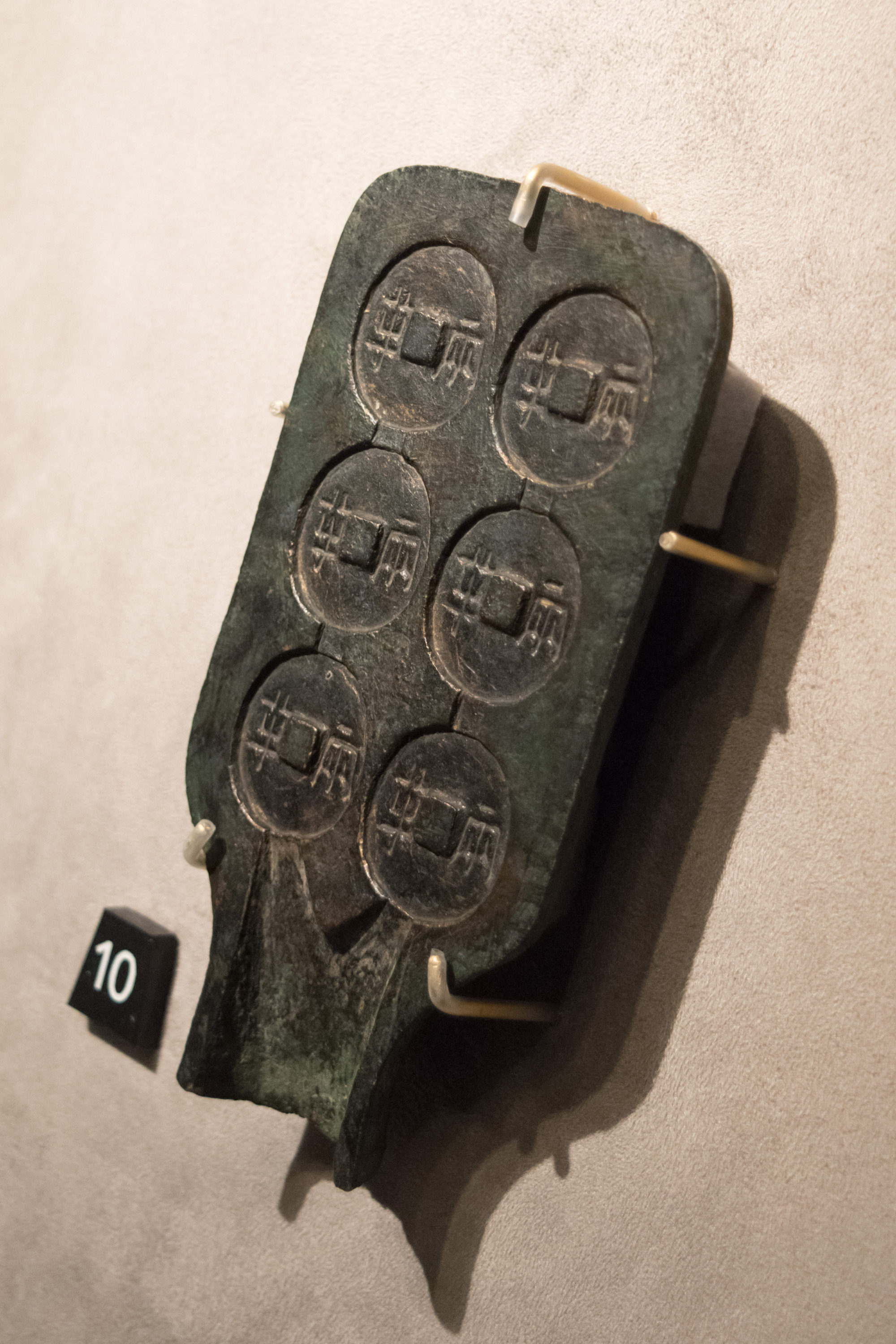
Mold for making banliang coins

A.C. Graham characterized Shen Dao as a theoretician of centralized power. He espouses an impersonal administration in much the same sense as Shen Buhai, and in contrast with Shang Yang emphasizes the use of talent and the promotion of ministers, saying that order and chaos are "not the product of one man's efforts." He also argued for Wu wei, or the non action of the ruler, along the same lines as Shen Buhai, saying

The Dao of ruler and ministers is that the ministers labour themselves with tasks while the prince has no task; the prince is relaxed and happy while the ministers bear responsibility for tasks. The ministers use all their intelligence and strength to perform his job satisfactorily, in which the ruler takes no part, but merely waits for the job to be finished. As a result, every task is taken care of. The correct way of government is thus.

However he challenges the Confucian and Mohist esteem and appointment of worthies as a basis of order, pointing out that talented ministers existed in every age. Taking it upon himself to attempt a new, analytical solution, Shen advocated fairness as a new virtue. Scholar Sugamoto Hirotsugu attributes the concept of Fen, or social resources, later used by the Guanzi and Xunzi, to Shen, given a "dimensional" difference through Fa (measurement, standards, law, protocol, administrative method), social relationships ("yin") and division. Shen Dao eschews appointment by interview in favour of a mechanical distribution ("the basis of fairness") with the invariable Fa apportioning every person according to their achievement.

If one rabbit runs through a town street, and a hundred chase it, it is because its distribution has not been determined... If the distribution has already been determined, even the basest people will not fight for it. The way to control All-under-Heaven and the country lies solely in determining distribution.

The greatest function of Fa ("the principle of objective judgement") is the prevention of selfish deeds and argument. However, doubting its long-term viability Shen did not exclude moral values and accepted (qualified) Confucian Li's supplementation of Fa and social relationships, though he frames Li in terms of (impersonal) rules.

"The state has the li of high and low rank, but not a li of men of worth and those without talent. There is a li of age an youth, but not of age and cowardice. There is a li of near and distant relatives, but no li of love and hate."

For this reason he is said to "laugh at men of worth" and "reject sages", his order relying not on them but on the Fa.

Linking Fa to the notion of impartial objectivity associated with universal interest, and reframing the language of the old ritual order to fit a universal, imperial and highly bureaucratized state, Shen cautions the ruler against relying on his own personal judgment, contrasting personal opinions with the merit of the objective standard, or fa, as preventing personal judgements or opinions from being exercised. Personal opinions destroy Fa, and Shen Dao's ruler therefore "does not show favoritism toward a single person."

When an enlightened ruler establishes [gong] ("duke" or "public interest"), [private] desires do not oppose the correct timing [of things], favoritism does not violate the law, nobility does not trump the rules, salary does not exceed [that which is due] one's position, a [single] officer does not occupy multiple offices, and a [single] craftsman does not take up multiple lines of work ... [Such a ruler] neither overworked his heart-mind with knowledge nor exhausted himself with self-interest (si), but, rather, depended on fa (standards) for settling matters of order and disorder, rewards and punishments for deciding on matters of right and wrong, and weights and balances for resolving issues of heavy or light ...

It is said: "When the great lord relies on fa and does not act personally, affairs are judged in accordance with (objective) standards (fa)." The benefit of fa is that each person meets his reward or punishment according to his due, and there are no further expectations of the lord. Thus resentment does not arise and superiors and inferiors are in harmony. If the lord of men abandons fa (standards) and governs with his own person, then penalties and rewards, seizures and grants, will all emerge from the lord's mind. If this is the case, then those who receive rewards, even if these are commensurate, will ceaselessly expect more; those who receive punishment, even if these are commensurate, will endlessly expect more lenient treatment... people will be rewarded differently for the same merit and punished differently for the same fault. Resentment arises from this.

Creel believed that Shen had the same sort of administrative idea denoted by Shen Buhai's Xing-Ming, he notes that he does not use the term.

== Doctrine of position (shi) ==
Shen Dao, as the Han Feizi's figure for shi, may be a later figure than Shang Yang and Shen Buhai. However, used in many areas of Chinese thought, shi (situational advantage) probably originated in the military field. Diplomats and kings wishing to free themselves from the aristocrats relied on concepts of situational advantage and opportunity, as well as secrecy, which is part Shen Buhai's doctrine, long before the ascendancy of sovereignty or law. Sun Tzu would go on to incorporate Taoist philosophy of inaction and impartiality, as well as punishment and rewards as systematic measures of organization, recalling Han Fei's concepts of power (shi) and tactics (shu).

On the shi of The Art of War, relatable to Shen Dao's, Henry Kissinger says: "Chinese statesmanship exhibits a tendency to view the entire strategic landscape as part of a single whole... Strategy and statecraft become means of 'combative coexistence' with opponents. The goal is to maneuver them into weakness while building up one's own shi, or strategic position." Kissinger considers the "maneuvering" approach an ideal, but one that ran in contrast to the conflicts of the Qin dynasty.

The older works of Jacques Gernet and A.C. Graham in particular took the Legalists as understanding that the power of the state resides in social and political institutions, innovative in their aim to subject the state to them. Like Shen Buhai, Shen Dao largely focused on statecraft (Fa), and Confucian Xun Kuang discusses him in this capacity, never referencing Shen Dao in relation to power. Shen Dao was early remembered for his theories on shi (lit. "situational advantage", but also "power" or "charisma") because Han Fei references him in this capacity.

=== Shen Dao ===
Searching out the causes of disorder, Shen Dao observed splits in the ruler's authority. Shen Dao's theory on power echoes Shen Buhai, referenced by Xun Kuang as its originator, who says "He who (can become) singular decision-maker can become the sovereign of All under Heaven". Shen Dao's theory may otherwise have been borrowed from the Book of Lord Shang.

For Shen Dao, "Power" (Shih) refers to the ability to compel compliance requiring no support from its subjects, though it does not preclude this. (Shih's) merit is that it prevents people from fighting each other; political authority is justified and essential on this basis. Shen Dao says: "When All under Heaven lacks the single esteemed [person], then there is no way to carry out the principles [of orderly government, li 理].... Hence the Son of Heaven is established for the sake of All under Heaven... All under Heaven is not established for the sake of the Son of Heaven..."

Talent cannot be displayed without power. Shen Dao says: "The flying dragon rides on the clouds and the rising serpent wanders in the mists. But when the clouds disperse and the mists clear up, the dragon and the serpent become the same as the earthworm and the large winged black ant because they have lost what they ride." Leadership is not a function of ability or merit, but is given by some a process, such as giving a leader to a group. "The ruler of a state is enthroned for the sake of the state; the state is not established for the sake of the prince. Officials are installed for the sake of their offices; offices are not established for the sake of officials...

Usually disregarded by the other figures, Shen Dao considers moral capability useful in terms of authority. If the ruler is inferior but his command is practised, it is because he is able to get support from people. But his ideas otherwise constitute a "direct challenge" to Confucian Virtue. Virtue is unreliable because people have different capacities. Both morality together with intellectual capability are insufficient to rule, while position of authority is enough to attain influence and subdue the worthy, making virtue "not worth going after."

== Decline ==
Commentary in the Han Feizi suggests that the Book of Lord Shang went into circulation in the late Warring States period with the ascent of Qin, entering into broader discussion. As an earlier more referenced writer from the flourishing Jixia academy, Shen Dao was arguably earlier more broadly well known than Shang Yang or Shen Buhai. Even in the late Warring States period, the Lushi Chunqiu, possibly influenced by the Han Feizi, still draws on at least "bits and pieces" of Shen Dao, holding a dim view of Shang Yang.

Though his ideas on power alone were influential enough for discussion in the Han Feizi, Herrlee G. Creel doubted that his following was ever as organized as that of Shang Yang or Shen Buhai, let alone the movements of the Confucians or Mohist, and ultimately lost discussion. Shang Yang and Shen Buhai continued to be debated in the later Discourses on Salt and Iron, seeing policy influence into the later Han dynasty.

Shen Dao is dismissive of the role of great men or sages. Though Shen Dao or Laozi are not generally considered anarchist, it would more accurately describe parts of the Zhuangzi that discusses them. Such 'anarchist' currents "tended to cede the ground of political discourse" to Confucianism. While still referenced in early Han dynasty texts like the Huainanzi, the Huainanzi was a work of scholarship surrounding Liu An, representative of the declining Han nobles.
