= Legalism (Chinese philosophy) =

Ancient school of political philosophy

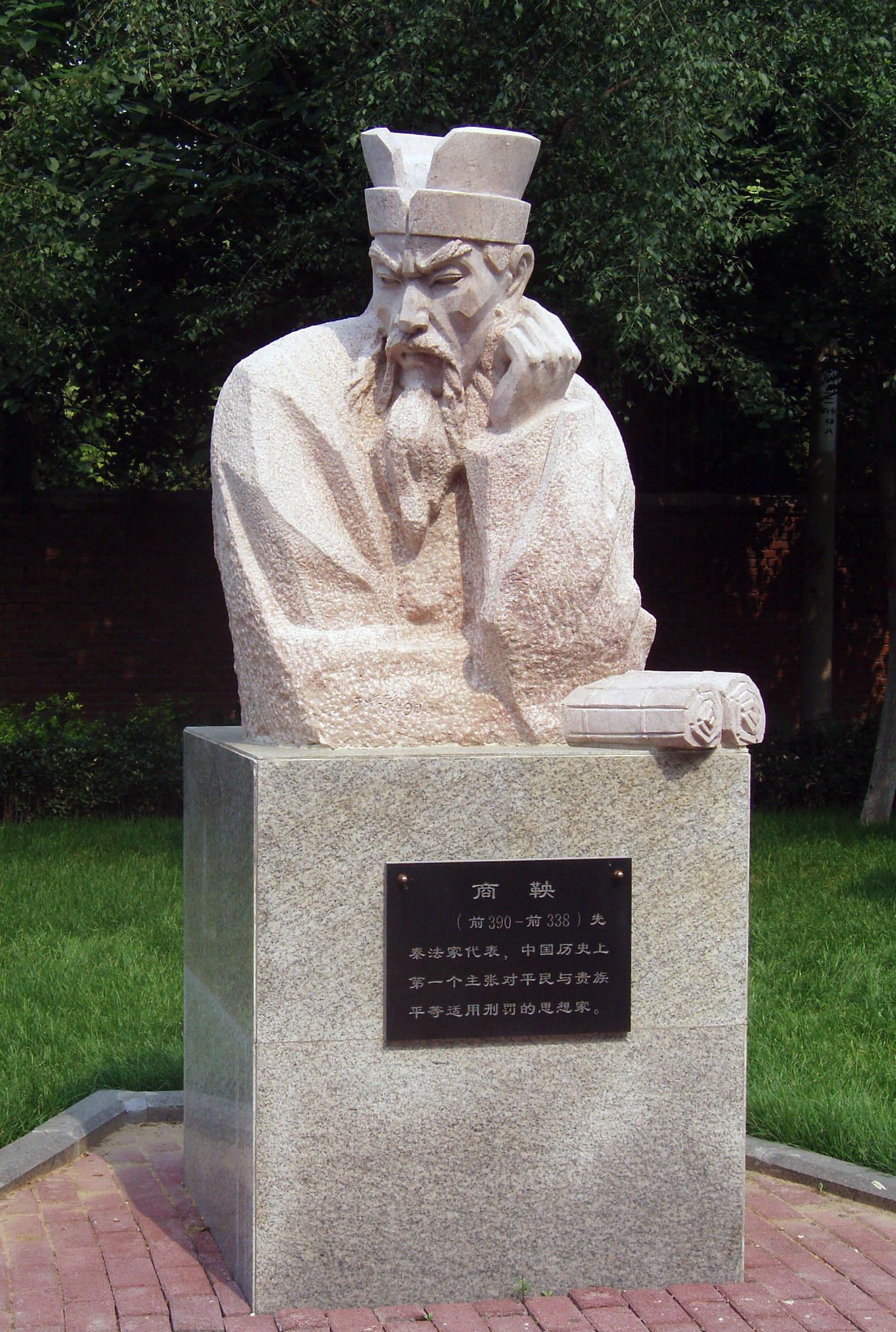
- Statue of the legalist Shang Yang
- Chinese: 法家
- Literal meaning: "School of law"
Transcriptions
Standard Mandarin
- Hanyu Pinyin: Fǎjiā
- Bopomofo: ㄈㄚˇ ㄐㄧㄚ
- Wade–Giles: Fa^{3}-chia^{1}
- IPA: [fà.tɕjá]
Yue: Cantonese
- Yale Romanization: Faatgā
- Jyutping: Faat3 gaa1
- IPA: [fat̚˧ ka˥]

Legalism (Chinese: 法家; pinyin: fǎjiā) refers to an intellectual, political, and philosophical orientation beginning in the Warring States period of China. While heterogeneous, the Legalists generally shared a view of most people—or at least the elite—as fundamentally self-interested, emphasizing equality under the law, administrative methods, and regulations. In addition, the Legalists tended to view the strengthening of agriculture and the military as the primary concern of the state, and they advocated for reducing the power of the aristocracy in favor of meritocracy and limiting the direct interference in the affairs of state by the sovereign.

The Legalist emphasis on pragmatic, results-driven governance put them at odds with the Confucians, who advocated for cultivated virtue as a primary method of building a well-governed state, as well as the Mohists, who supported an egalitarian society driven by universal love.

While the core Legalist thinkers heavily criticised Confucianism and Mohism, their relationship with Daoism was much more complex. Some legalist thinkers, such as Han Fei (considered by many to be the greatest Legalist thinker), were greatly influenced by Daoism, and drew inspiration from the Daoist concept of Wu wei (non-action) to describe their ideal of a ruler who retreated from active management of the state in favor of setting universal rules and standards. The confluence of Legalist and Daoist ideas is referred to as Huang-Lao, which was the dominant ideology of the early Han dynasty.

Legalist ideas first saw institutional adoption in Qin state, under Shang Yang's reforms in the 4th century BCE. These reforms, such as providing fiefs based on military performance and punishing farmers who failed to meet quotas, would become instrumental in Qin's conquest of China and establishment of China's first imperial dynasty. The Qin dynasty's reputation for brutality and rigid, harsh laws led successive dynasties to distance themselves from Legalism, opting instead to proclaim Confucianism as the official state ideology; however, the Legalist bureaucratic apparatus established by Qin was adopted by the following Han dynasty, and would remain a profound influence on Chinese statecraft throughout Chinese history.

The concept of a "Legalist" school of thought first appeared in the Han dynasty, and was primarily used as a bibliographic category to describe a variety of thinkers from the Warring States period. However, the term has been debated dating back to early scholarship, as not all focused on law, or jurisprudence so much as organization and leadership. Some more recent scholarship has regarded this label as inaccurate. Nonetheless, the term persists in both popular and scholarly accounts of the period.

== Background ==
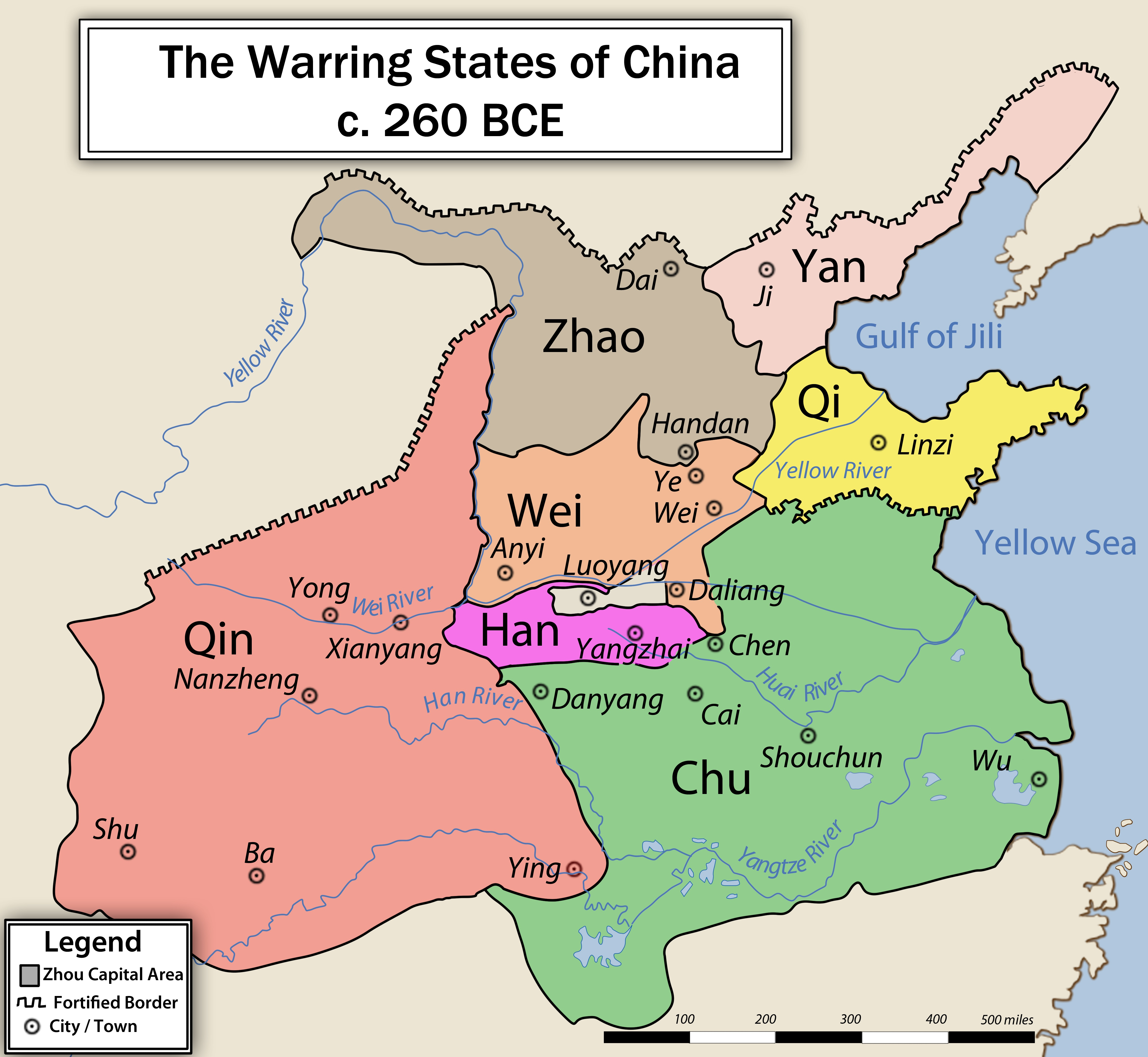
The seven major states of the Warring States period, c. 260 BCE. The Jixia Academy, where many proto-Daoist and Legalist thinkers were active, was located in the state of Qi.

The establishment of the Eastern Zhou dynasty in 770 BCE marked the beginning of a gradual decline in the Chinese political order. Previously, China had operated under a feudalistic system in which lords swore fealty to the Zhou king; however, Zhou authority was challenged by local fiefdoms acting as states in their own right. By the early 5th century, the Zhou monarchy had become largely symbolic, and the political landscape of China was dominated by intense competition and warfare between rival states in what is known as the Warring States period.

The collapse of the Zhou order provided the impetus for the development of new political ideas - without their allegiance to the Zhou dynasty, states needed other frameworks in which they could ground their legitimacy. In addition, the fierce rivalries between the warring states led to a demand for thinkers who could help stabilise and strengthen states politically, economically, and militarily. The innovative and diverse ideas that were developed during this period are known as the Hundred Schools of Thought, which form the basis of Chinese philosophy.

The first major schools to emerge during this flourishing of intellectual activity were Confucianism and Mohism, which held widely diverging positions. To the Confucians, the success of the state depended its virtue - A virtuous king, who held fast to the ritual order of the Zhou dynasty, would inevitably inspire virtue in his ministers, which would in turn lead to a virtuous populace and thriving state. Meanwhile, the Mohists held that the state should be run on rationalist, egalitarian grounds, with officials appointed for ability rather than birth, and with resources directed away from frivolities like music and ritual and towards strengthening the state.

By the fourth century, both Confucianism and Mohism would come under heavy criticism by a new, loose cluster of thinkers who would later be classified as Daoists and Legalists. Closely associated with the nascent Jixia Academy in Qi state, these thinkers attacked the two major schools for imposing artificial disruptions on the natural way of things, and advocated for a posture of non-action and return to simplicity. These ideas exerted a major influence on the thought of Shen Buhai, Shen Dao, and Han Fei, who would later be classified as major Legalist thinkers.

== Imperial Library category ==
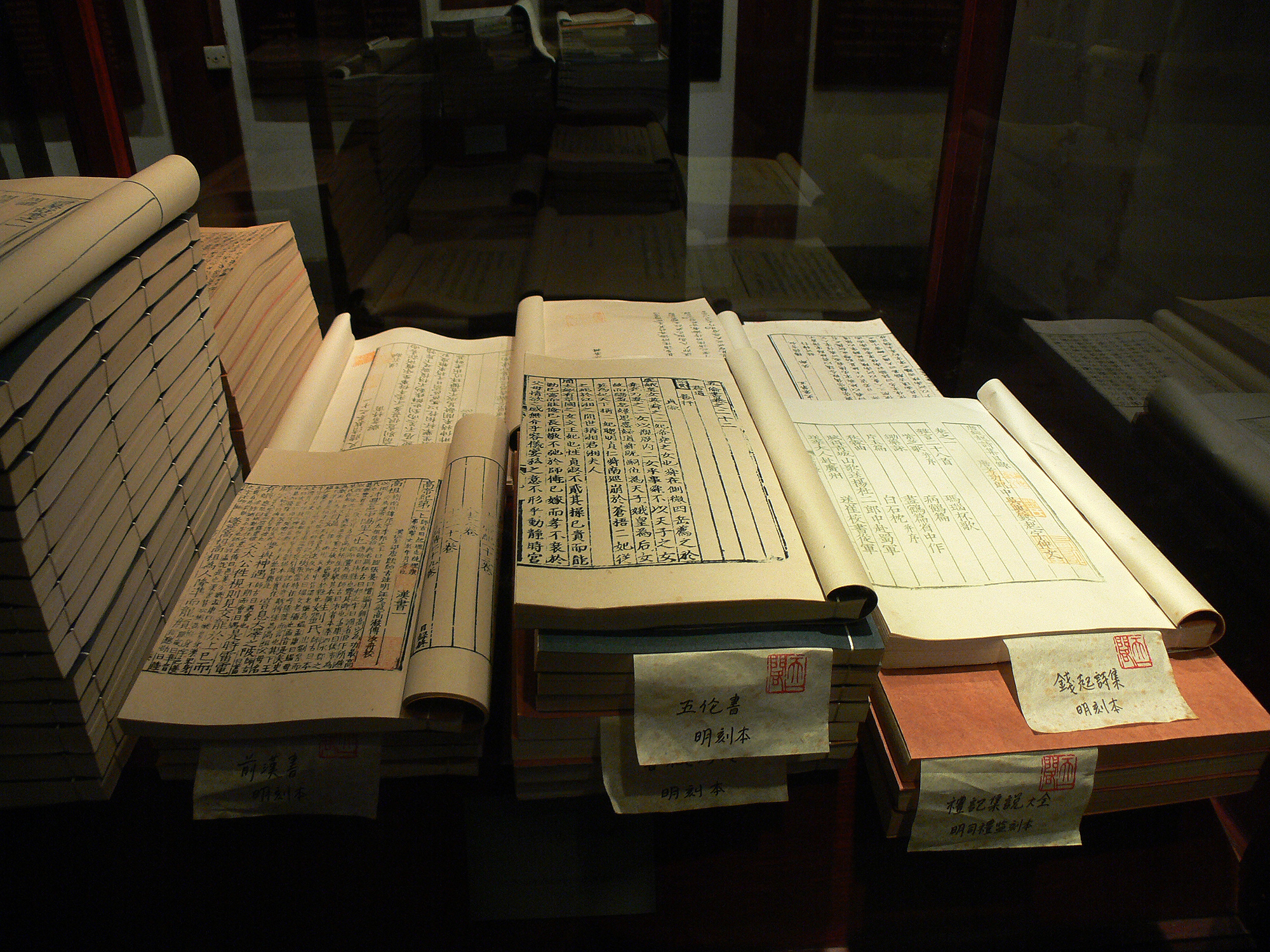
Book of Han or Hanshu, carved in the Ming dynasty, in the Tian Yi Chamber Library collection

The Han Feizi (Ch.43) referred to Shang Yang's followers as a school focused on fa (law) as something like "Legalists", contrasting him with Shen Buhai as focused on administrative techniques. Favoring neither fa, nor techniques between them, the Han Feizi's Ch.11 describes its own self-identified class of desired ministers as fashuzishi (法術之士), meaning "men of service adept at both laws and techniques of rule", or "men of methods" in short.

Likely only meaning "law-abiding families" (jia) in Mencius's time or "economists" in the Guanzi, it is unlikely anyone politically identified themselves as a "fa", or legalist, school. Apart from Confucianism and Mohism, early Han dynasty historian Sima Tan (165–110 BCE) presented schools as somewhat hypothetical, broad conceptual areas or styles of governmental practice, but not precise abstract ideologies with specific people or texts.

Sima Tan coined the term "fajia" ("fa school") in an essay included in the Shiji's final chapter, On the Essentials of the Six Schools of Thought. More broadly including methods for distinguishing offices, his concept of "Fa school" was not originally identical to a concept of Legalism. Discussing approaches to governance, Tan argued the superiority of a syncretic political "Dao school" ("Daojia") including the "best" elements of six schools, but came to refer more simply to Laozi-Zhuangzi Daoism by the third century.

Han Confucian scholar Liu Xiang (77–6 BCE) used fajia or "fa school" as a category of "masters texts" when he established the Imperial Library, becoming a major category in Han dynasty catalogues, namely its Book of Han (Hanshu, 111 CE) CH30. The bibliographic classifications do not claim to be precise or exclusive, sorting texts taken to be related by intellectual resemblances. Excluding Chao Cuo, the known texts are those referenced in the Han Feizi, stemming from its combined discussion contrasting Shen Buhai with Shang Yang (Ch.43).

Alongside the Han Feizi's more famously referenced Book of Lord Shang, Shen Buhai, and Shen Dao (Ch.40), six other texts were listed under the fa school, now lost, including Li Kui (HFZ 30 & 32) and Han minister Chao Cuo (Hanshu CH1), leaving four unidentifiable works. The Hanshu considered Li Kui the first of broader works on regulations, influencing Shang Yang. Only officially reclassified from (syncretist) Daoism in the Sui dynasty, the Guanzi text, named for the much earlier Guan Zhong, is a late compilation, possibly going into broad circulation together with the Book of Lord Shang late in the period. (HFZ Ch.49) While not included, the late pre-Imperial Qin state's encyclopedic Lushi Chunqiu includes chapters discussing Shang Yang, Shen Buhai and Shen Dao.

Though considering bad laws better than no laws, Shen Dao preferred good law, advocating that punishment and reward should be proportionate rather than extreme. In contrast to Shang Yang and Han Fei, Liu Xiang says that Shen Buhai opposed punishment in favor of supervisory technique (shu). But he does resemble the later Han Feizi more than any other text. Gradually associating Shang Yang and Shen Buhai through the Han Feizi, the three are associated together with the Qin dynasty, subsequently associated with a harsh penal policy derived from Shang Yang and the Han Feizi. Following Sima Tan, they came to be seen together as strict and unkind advocates of cruel law and merciless punishment.

- Sima Tan praises fajia for honoring rulers, and subordinating subjects, clearly distinguishing offices so that no one oversteps his responsibilities. He described the fa school as emphasizing fa administrative protocols that ignore kinship and social status, treating everyone equally and thereby elevating the ruler above humanity. Defining kindness as judging people differently (kinship and social status), Tan criticizes fajia as being strict with little kindness, as a temporary policy that could not last.
- Included in the Book of Han, Liu Xin (c. 46 BCE – 23 CE) adds that fajia likely originated in an ancient Zhou dynasty department of prisons (or justice, in Feng Youlan's more positive reading) "make reward certain and punishment unavoidable, as a support to control by (Confucian) ceremony", reject teaching and benevolence (though Li Kui was more focused on education than Shang Yang), and concern for others, aiming to perfect government relying only on punishment and law (though the Han Feizi also famously advocated techniques of rule), inflicting corporal punishment even on closest kin, and demeaning mercy and generosity. Feng Youlan's early scholarship considered this a legitimate attempt at history, but not an accurate one.

== Sima Qian ==
Though the Daodejing (Laozi) disadvises too much reliance on law, the work is not anarchist; the Zhuangzi that later discusses it includes "anarchist" strains. Later termed Daoist, A.C. Graham took the Zhuangzi as preferring a private life, while the Daodejing contains an art of rule. Xun Kuang does not perceive the two as belonging to a single school in his time, listing them separately. Listed in the Outer Zhuangzi alongside Mozi, Laozi, Zhuangzi, and Hui Shi, the Zhuangzi does not associate Shen Dao with a literal Daoist or Legalist school, and was probably not familiar with the idea.

Simply giving Shang Yang his own chapter, Sima Qian attested Shen Buhai, Shen Dao and Han Fei as "rooted" in Huang-Lao or "Yellow Emperor and Laozi (Daoism)". Sima Qian and Ban Gu describe Huang-Lao as works of rule, and makes more sense if understood as techniques of governance. This is arguably what the term Daojia "Daoism" refers to in the Shiji, rather than just Laozi and Zhuangzi as understood modernly.

Though considering Han Fei cruel, Sima Qian's "Biographies of Laozi and Han Fei" (Ch.63), presumably under its banner, discussed him and Shen Buhai alongside Laozi and Zhuangzi, claiming them as originating in dao ("the Way") and de (inner power, virtue), or "the meaning of" the Way and its virtue. "Overshadowing" Zhuangzi, Sima Qian considered Laozi the most profound of them, but places Shen Buhai just below Laozi and the free-spirited Zhuangzi.

The Way that Laozi esteemed was [based on] emptiness; thus, he reacted to changes through non-action. Hence the words of his book are profound and subtle and are difficult to comprehend. Zhuangzi was unfettered by the Way and virtue and set loose his discussions; yet his essentials also go back to spontaneity. Master Shen Buhai treated the lowly as lowly, applying to it the principle of "names and substance (Ming-shi 名實)." Master Han Fei drew on ink line, penetrated the nature of the matters, and was clear about right and wrong. But he was extremely cruel and had little compassion. All these ideas originated from the meaning of the Way and its virtue, but Laozi was the most profound of them. Shiji 63

Though Sima Qian favors Laozi and Zhuangzi, what Sima Tan called the "Dao school" or "Daoism" bears more resemblance to what they described as Huang-Lao, or a "Daoist-Legalist" syncretism. As advocates of what they called Daoism, the Simas could be expected to argue from its viewpoint, i.e., in favor of their own position. But the Han Feizi's Chapter 5 already discusses Laozi and Shen Buhai together, albeit as part of Han Feizi's own critique.

== The Han Feizi's combination ==
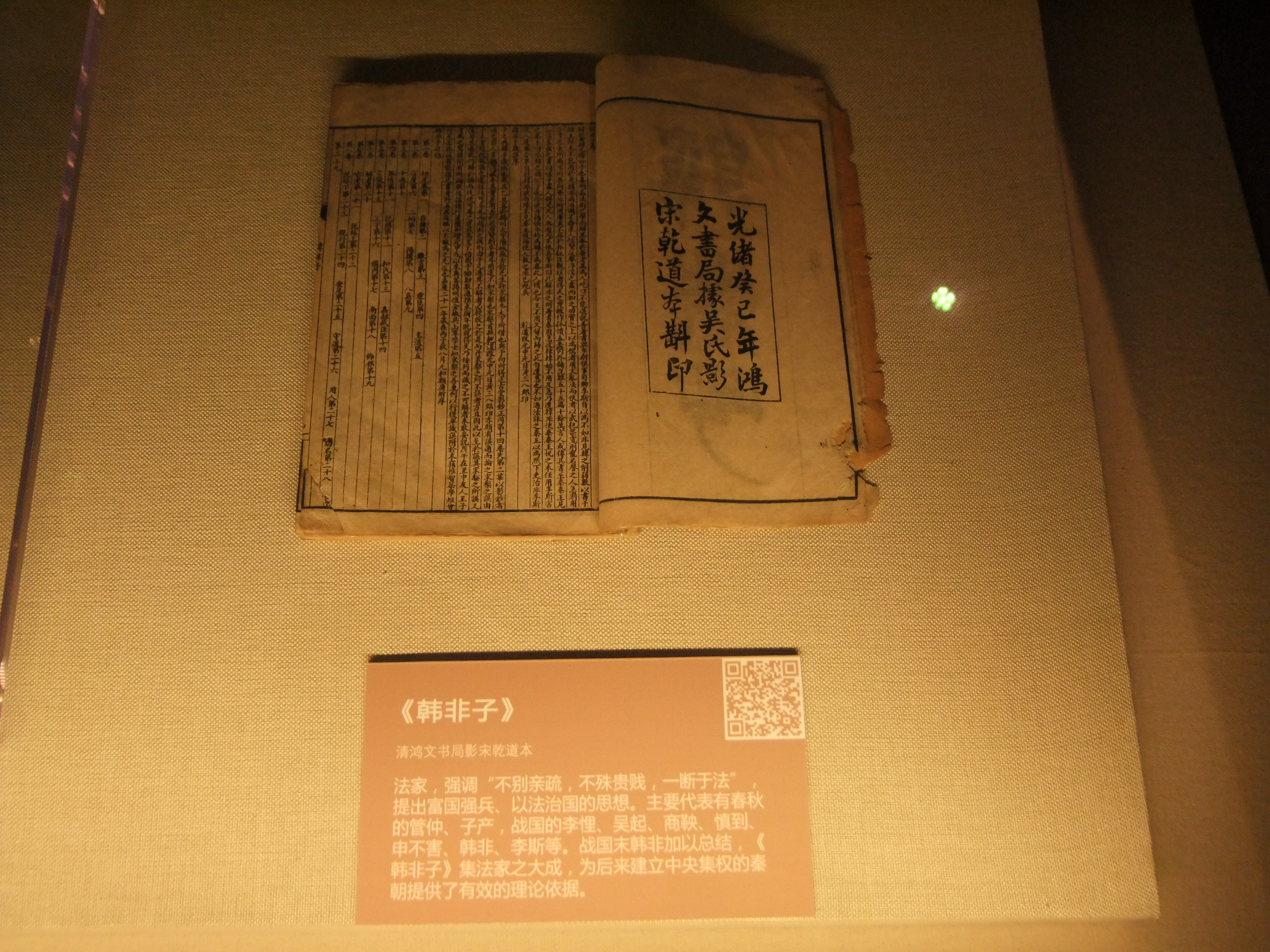
A late 19th-century edition of the Hanfeizi by Hongwen Book Company

In connection with the flourishing Jixia Academy, the scholar Shen Dao was arguably earlier more broadly well known than Shang Yang and Shen Buhai, at least by reference. A naturalist in the direction of Tao te Ching, he argued that the realm be literally modeled (fa) off the natural world. In line with Laozi, his wu wei (inactive) sage ruler "does not (personally) harm men", the people themselves eliminating harm (in line with the law). Sharing the doctrine of positional power with the late Guanzi, the Guanzi has civil power, military power, and benevolent power.

Criticized as "obsessed by fa (laws and models)" by his late Warring States Confucian Jixia Academy successor Xun Kuang, Shen Dao is discussed before Shen Buhai and Shang Yang in the Han Feizi's Outer Chapter 40 "Objections to positional power" ("Nan shi" 難勢) for his views on power. Quoting a parable from a known separated chapter of the Zhuangzi, the Han Feizi depicts his doctrine as akin to a dragon floating on clouds, much as he is depicted in the Zhuangzi.

The famed Chinese scholar Hou Wailu termed Han Fei as the theory of law and method (fa-shu) in the era of (shi) power. As chancellors of neighboring states, doctrines associated with the Qin state's Shang Yang, and Han state's Shen Buhai, would have intersected before Qin imperial unification. Said to have been a privileged scion of the late Han state, a real Han Fei would have been well-positioned to learn of them. Chapter 43 "famously" criticizes Shang Yang as too focused on fa, and Shen Buhai on techniques of rule.

When Gongsun Yang governed Qin, he established a system of mutual reporting and responsibility for performance;

As for fa law, it means that regulations and ordinances are recorded and displayed in the official archives, that punishments and fines appear inevitable to the people's minds, that rewards are in place for those who are cautious in regard to the laws, and that punishments are applied to those who offend against the ordinances. This is what the ministers take as their guiding authority.

Though Shen Buhai issued laws, Han Fei says that he neither consolidated the laws nor unified the regulations and ordinances, and only appears referenced as legal figure together with Shang Yang in the Han dynasty. Sima Qian, Liu Xiang and Yang Xiong primarily associate him with what the Han Feizi later termed Shu techniques of rule. The Han Feizi's Chapter 43 defined Shen Buhai's techniques as bestowing office on the basis of concrete responsibilities, examining minister's abilities, appointing candidates in accordance with their capabilities, demanding ministerial achievements or "performance" (xing "forms") accountable to their proposals or "titles" (ming "names") as becoming offices, and grasping fast the handles of life and death.

The Han Feizi is the first preserved reference for writings associated with the distant Qin state's Shang Yang outside Qin, with The Book of Lord Shang possibly going into broad circulation in the late Warring States period alongside the Guanzi (text) as referenced by the Han Feizi. Arguably as much a military reformer, before Han Fei, Xun Kuang only appeared familiar Shang Yang as a renowned military leader. As famous in this capacity, Shang Yang is also included in the Hanshu as a military master alongside Sun Wu, Wu Qi, and Sun Bin. Earlier chapters in the Han Feizi pair Shang Yang with Wu Qi as model reformers, and the Han Feizi's Ch.43 lauds his reform of military promotions.

== Ruler's aides ==
In the sense that every state must have had its bureaucratic reformers, Ray Huang (1988) took "Legalists" as a 'school' second to the Confucians alongside the Daoists. They can at least be understated in the sense that they occupied high positions. They probably never formed self-aware, organized schools to the extent of the Confucians or Mohists, did not reach their level of (interstate) visibility, and were not entirely separate from their contemporaries.

Rather than representing particular partisans of fa law and method, arguably, Shang Yang and Shen Buhai are interested in fa as an art of rule, as prime ministers of their respective states, together with Han Fei as members of their ruling class Shen Dao and Han Fei see kings as ruling more because they have the authority, power, position or charisma to reward or punish, than because they have a special expertise in legal or ritual language.

Shang Yang adapts the fa standards, an idea earlier developed by the Mohists, as a replacement for the ruler's own deliberations. While Shen Buhai's ruler manages ministers rationally, Shen Buhai secludes him from the trouble of articulating the details of anything. If he can convince himself of his own acting, perhaps he will also become humble, and refrain from constantly interfering in the state.

The former kings knew that they could not rely on their own deliberations and private appointments; hence, they established standards and clarified divisions. Book of Lord Shang 14.2; Zhang 2012: 166

The ruler orders the essentials; the ministers carry out the details... He who excels at being a master, relies on [an appearance of] stupidity, establishes himself in insufficiency, places himself in timidity, conceals himself in having no undertakings, hides his motives, and covers his tracks... To speak ten times and ten times be right; to act a hundred times and a hundred times succeed—this is the task of a minister and not the Way of the ruler.

Said to have been a scion of the Han state, the Han Feizi depicts Han Fei as an outsider "blocked by malevolent political heavyweights". Comparing Shen Buhai with Shang Yang, Han Fei blames his predecessor Shen Buhai for failing to consolidate the law and achieve hegemony. But he did issue a law. More focused on bureaucracy as chancellor of the Han state, he just wasn't more technically advanced than his contemporaries; the Xunzi and Han Feizi are more technically advanced as late Warring States period texts. Neither was Shen Dao more technically advanced.

While Han Fei may not have thought Shen Buhai's legal ability measured up to Shang Yang, Sima Qian argues that Han was still well governed, emphasizing his successful defense of the small state. In the sense of early Warring States mobilization, the Book of Lord Shang's case is more universal than unique, with other such texts just not preserved. Han Fei's predecessors just happened to be carried into Qin and associated with Shang Yang through the Han Feizi. The Confucian archivists considered at least four now unidentifiable works under the fa school. That does not include works listed under other schools that still include fa, some of which were lost.

Though there is not enough information on the Warring States, their development was not that dissimilar to Qin, particularly in terms of economic centralizing tendencies. Qin was mainly unique in the degree of its reform, registering and mobilizing all male adults, setting Qin on a path to dominance. It wasn't fully differentiated from other "feudal" states until the late Warring States reform of Fan Sui, which centralized power in the throne and adopted a more brutal military policy. As progenitor of a powerful state earlier considered a backwater, Shang Yang becomes institutionally influential as a consequence of reforms facilitating military projection.

Even supposing that fa laws and methods (or fa law for Legalism) are the dominant element in the Han Feizi, it wouldn't make Legalism a distinct ideology if the ruler agreed in principle that law served his interest. It would make it identical with the position of the ruler, describable at a basic level as: Warring States period ruler interested in having fa standards and regulations with an aim to conquest. Han Fei assumes the ruler would be interested in it, but Shang Yang did not invent penal law.

Fa, as including laws, is not the exclusive domain of the fa school, and Shang Yang and Han Fei's goal of addressing social chaos is comparable to other major figures of the era, Confucius, Laozi, Mozi, Zhuang Zhou, Mencius, and Xun Kuang. While Shang Yang was more radical and successful, agriculture and conscription concerned most thinkers of the Warring States period, with different solutions. Contemporary to Shen Dao, the Confucian Mencius also considered fa necessary, at least in the (early) sense of measurement, instead arguing that a benevolent ruler would attract dedicated soldiers.

=== Legalism ===
Henrique Schneider (2018) was a modern advocate of Legalist interpretation. Legalism would "seem to entail that those thinkers... were committed to the law", viewing Legalism as a combination of realism and "state consequentialism", holding that "whatever was good for the state, fortifying its structure and strengthening its ruler, would lead to order with beneficial consequences for everyone". Legalist interpretation supposes that Han Fei's relation with Shang Yang was stronger than that of his other predecessors. Putting aside fa as broader than law, Schneider only admits an instrumental view of Legalism.

In vacillation: "the objective of the Legalist philosophers was to strengthen the position of the state" or "the position of its ruler." The elite, and ministers and officials are an "important instrument of the ruler's power"; "unifying weights and measures, promulgating law codes, registering households, collecting taxes, and recruiting men for official work and for the army" are all "handles of state" of the ruler. Han Fei is not admitted as a self-conscious philosopher, but as a member of the ruling class, as a councilor to monarchs; finally, Schneider does not admit that rewards and punishments are valuable for Han Fei except "in the hand of an able monarch".

While Ban Gu includes the Han Feizi under the fa school, he and Sima Qian view it as more of a work on techniques of governance. It is possible that ideas comparable to natural law exist in the Warring States period, but Han Fei, as a pragmatist, is not its best representative; the Huangdi Sijing (Boshu) or to an extent the Guanzi are better examples. The Han Feizi has more naturalistic arguments in its few chapters, syncretizing with Laozi commentaries. One of the reasons harsh punishment lacked staying power across the Warring States to the Han dynasty, is that figures like Han Fei didn't have sufficient argument for it. Arguments in the Book of Lord Shang that punishment will reduce the number of punishments produce expectations to control ministers, and that a sage king will finally abolish the punishments universally.

Han Fei's limited ideological backing for law does not mean he does not consider it supremely useful for "correcting the faults of the high, rebuking the vices of the low, eliminating the disorders, settling the erroneous, avoiding the mistakes, subduing the arrogant, straightening the crooked, unifying the customs of the masses, holding the people in awe and veneration, rebuking obscenity and danger, or forbidding falsehood and deceit." Such a statement is more or less quoted by the Qing dynasty Yongzheng Emperor. Han dynasty judges are more comparable with rule of law. The judge Zhang Shizhi makes some attempt to "restrict the conflicts between the imperial power and the observation of law", considering law to have its own value apart from the Emperor.

When a harsher punishment was asked to be enforced by Emperor Wen of Han, Zhang Shizhi presented a memorial to the emperor, saying: The law is made both for 'Tian Zi' (the son of Heaven or the emperor) and the people in the world. Now according to the law, such a punishment shall be given to this man. If a harsher one had been given, the people would lose their faith in the law.

== Legalists or administrators ==
Used in reference to Fajia or "School of fa", the origin of the term Legalism is unknown. Taking Shang Yang as an example, Joseph Needham (1954) used the term Legalism in reference to a positive law interpretation of fa, specifying such things as regulations for roads. Although the term Legalism has still seen some conventional use in recent years, such as in Adventures in Chinese Realism, apart from its anachronism, scholarship has avoided it for reasons dating back to Herrlee G. Creel's 1961 Legalists or Administrators?.

The Han Feizi presented Shang Yang as focused primarily on fa standards, including law, and Shen Buhai fa (standards) in the administration, differentiating it as (administrative) technique (shu). Creel translated Shen Buhai's fa as method, presenting him as perhaps the "first systematic theorist of organizational and managerial science", with a hierarchical, merit-based appointment of ministers, and apart from the Han Feizi, a historical following opposing harsh penal law.

Generally, the use of fa (standards) in the administration does not automatically imply punishment. Han Fei and Shen Dao make some use of fa (standards) akin to law, and of reward and punishment, but often use fa similarly to Shen Buhai: as an administrative technique. Shen Buhai uses fa (standards) to compare officials' duties and performances, and the Han Feizi often emphasizes fa in this sense. With a particular quotation from the Han Feizi as an example:

An enlightened ruler employs fa (standards) to pick his men; he does not select them himself. He employs fa (method) to weigh their merit; he does not fathom it himself. Thus, ability cannot be obscured nor failure prettified. If those who are [falsely] glorified cannot advance, and likewise those who are maligned cannot be set back, then there will be clear distinctions between lord and subject, and order will be easily [attained]. Thus, the ruler can only use fa.

From a modern viewpoint, Shen Buhai could be argued to be a Legalist inasmuch as his ruler follows guidelines. Internally, Han Fei could consider this a victory for the fa method. They probably did not see it as literal Legalism. Apart from contracts, and what law Shen Buhai did make, the guidelines Shen Buhai's ruler consulted (fa) were secret, internal bureaucratic operations, protecting him against the ministers. Externally, the Han Feizi contrasts Shen Buhai and the shu technique with Shang Yang's fa as including law, and with law as clear and public.

As for techniques of rule, they are hidden in the chest. It is that through which you match up all the various ends and from your secret place steer the ministers. Therefore, laws are best when they are clear, whereas techniques should not be seen. (Han Feizi 38.16; Chen2000: 922–923 ["Nan san" 難三])

The Fa method, or the Shu technique as termed in the Han Feizi, helps Shen Buhai and his ruler interpret information, define qualifications and duties, and make it more difficult for ministers to lie. The Han Feizi advocates legal reform as facilitating standardized technical procedures in streamlining ministerial operations. Although seeking more law, Han Fei comes from an environment of dangerous ministers seeking to reward and punish. Like Shen Buhai, this makes him more concerned with managing ministers than the people, and monopolization the key to power.

The Han Feizi's choice to include law is not accidental, and is at least indirectly intended to benefit the people, insomuch as the state is benefited by way of order. It can (or has, by a law expert rather than Sinologist) be compared to a legislative rule of law inasmuch as it develops beyond purposes serving those of simply the ruler, operating separately from him once established. Han Fei says: "The enlightened ruler governs his officials; he does not govern the people." The ruler cannot jointly govern the people in a large state. Nor can his direct subordinates themselves do it. The ruler wields methods to control officials.

== Agriculture and war ==
Michael Loewe's 1986 Cambridge History still considered fa law a first principle of the Book of Lord Shang, upholding state power. Relying more on group responsibility in the early period, Shang Yang's fa has both rewards and punishments. But Loewe considered Shang Yang's major aim a "unified, powerful state, based on an industrious peasantry and disciplined army", establishing a hierarchy of military ranks carried over into agriculture in the late period. Agriculture and war may have been Shang Yang's "single most important slogan." Though Xun Kuang is probably accurate in considering Shen Dao to be focused on fa administrative standards, his secondary subject, shi or "situational authority", of which he speaks in Chapter 40 of the Han Feizi, is incorporated in The Art of War.

By the early Warring States period, the kings had become more powerful, recruiting officials with an aim to advance universal census, taxes, agriculture, and finally universal military service as part of mobilization efforts. The only surviving work of its kind, the Book of Lord Shang represents an extreme example of this early mobilization extending to the population. Shaping its overall policy, the Qin organized society on a military basis as familial, mutual responsibility groups of five and ten for military recruitment. Sima Qian considered its reform the first of Shang Yang's accomplishments.

Alongside standardized penal law, Shang Yang and Han Fei's (desired) rulers oversee colonization, taxes, the military, and for Han Fei, administration of the bureaucracy inherited from Shen Buhai, allowing accountable ministers to volunteer themselves to office on the basis of proposals. Considering them harmful to such ends, Han Fei opposes traditional privileges, demagoguery, tyranny, and corvée. Yuri Pines takes Shang Yang's "overarching commitment" to be a centralized, "rich state and powerful army", with an aim to "unify all under heaven" and establish the next dynasty. Rule by fa standards and penal punishments are secondary to victory.

Prime ministers Shen Buhai and Zichan were both concerned with the recruitment of ministers and defense. Although not the primary focus of Shen Buhai's administrative treatise, Shen Buhai is a figure in the Stratagems of the Warring States and was both a diplomat and military reformer, at least for defense. Said to have maintained the security of his state, he was noted historically both for bureaucracy and for making the Hann state's military strong. Han Fei may criticize Shen Buhai compared with Shang Yang, but the Stratagems and Sima Qian considered defense of the Han state a major consequence of his foreign policy and administrative reforms.

Loewe considered Shang Yang's economic and political reforms unprecedented, far more significant than his personal military achievements. But he was arguably as much a military reformer, possibly even standardizing the road network for military purposes, and did personally lead Qin to victory over Wei. The Han also recognized him as a military strategist. A work attributed to him, possibly the same, is also listed under the Han Imperial Library's Military Books under Strategists.

Pines takes the Book of Lord Shang's primary doctrine to be that of connecting people's inborn nature or dispositions (xing 性) with names (ming 名), the Book of Lord Shang holding that fa laws will not be successful without "investigating the people's disposition." The work recommends enacting laws that allow people to "pursue the desire for a name", namely fame and high social status, or just wealth if acceptable. By connecting these "names" with actual benefits, it was hoped that if people pursue them, they will be less likely to commit crimes and more likely to work hard or fight in wars.

== Changing with the times ==
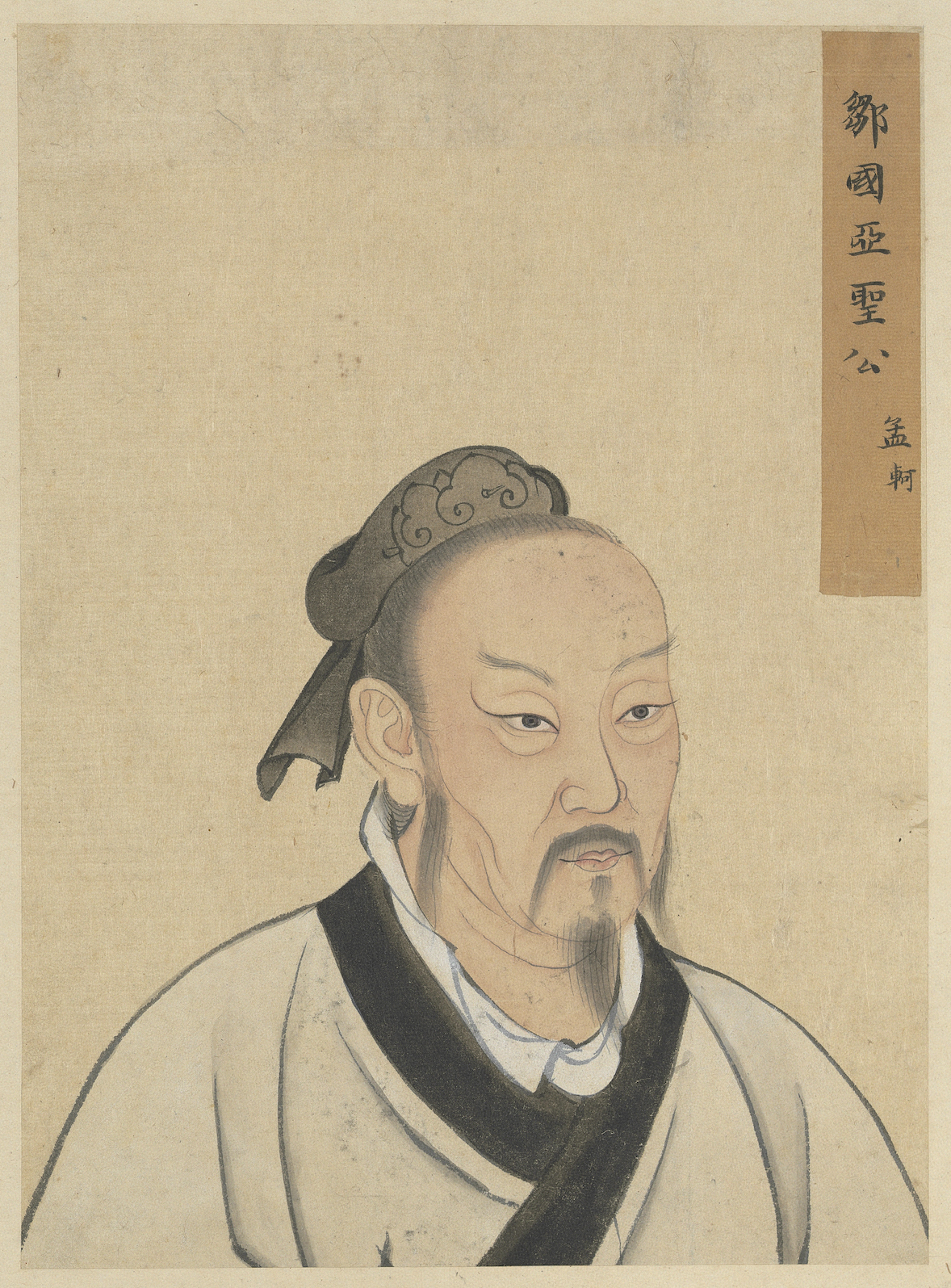
The people of Qi have a saying – "A man may have wisdom and discernment, but that is not like embracing the favourable opportunity. A man may have instruments of husbandry, but that is not like waiting for the farming seasons." Mencius

The early work of Feng Youlan took the statesmen as fully understanding that needs change with the times and material circumstances; admitting that people may have been more virtuous anciently, Han Fei believes that new problems require new solutions. Earlier thought to be rare, in fact, a changing-with-times paradigm, or one of timeliness, "dominated" the age.

Yuri Pines (Stanford Encyclopedia) contrasts Shang Yang and Han Fei's more specific view of history as an evolutionary process. It might have influenced an end of history view expressed by the Qin dynasty, but would be a radical departure from earlier ideas. The Qin idea of an eternal dynasty would seem more closely connected to reliance on law rather than the ruler.

In what A. C. Graham took to be a "highly literary fiction", as Pines recalls, the Book of Lord Shang's chapter 1, "Revising the laws," opens with a debate held by Duke Xiao of Qin, seeking to "consider the changes in the affairs of the age, inquire into the basis for correcting standards, and seek the Way to employ the people." Gongsun attempts to persuade the Duke to change with the times, with the Shangjunshu citing him as saying: "Orderly generations did not [follow] a single way; to benefit the state, one need not imitate antiquity."

Graham compared Han Fei in particular with the Malthusians, as "unique in seeking a historical cause of changing conditions", namely population growth, acknowledging that an underpopulated society only needs moral ties. The Guanzi argues punishment was unnecessary in ancient times when resources were abundant, making it a question of poverty rather than human nature. Human nature is a Confucian issue. Graham otherwise considered the customs current of the time as having no significance to the statesmen, even if they may be willing to conform the government to them. Han Fei "objects to ancient authority" not only because the times have changed, but because the past is uncertain.

Taking Shang Yang as inheriting from Li Kui and Wu Qi, despite anti-Confucianism in the Shangjunshu, Professor Ch'ien Mu still considered that "People say merely that Legalist origins are in Dao and De (power/virtue) [i.e., Daoist principles], apparently not aware that their origins in fact are in Confucianism. Their observance of law and sense of public justice are wholly in the spirit of Confucius' rectification of names and return to propriety, but transformed in accordance with the conditions of the age." In ancient society, punishment by law would typically only apply to the people, while the nobles were only punished by ritual. But needs change with the times. Making use of the term, Shen Buhai and the Guanzi do have administrative ideas that go back to the Confucian rectification of names, or cheng ming.

Sinologist Hansen viewed the morally neutral naturalism of Shen Dao as a development of the type of thinking seen in Mencius and early Mohists, beginning to emphasize a concept of Dao over nature. Shen Dao promotes a "Way of Heaven", but the concept doesn't appear to have been as developed in his time, or focused on as much as later texts. Hansen took Shen Dao and Han Fei as aiming at what they took to be the "'actual' course of history", with Han Fei concretizing Shen Dao's ideas on circumstantial authority, and a changing with the times paradigm introduced in its first chapters, under the Dao or "Way" of Laozi, combined with Shen Buhai in Chapter 5.

Devoting large sections to drawing practical guidelines for politics, the Huangdi Sijing attempts to apply "concrete" politics to the theorizing of public policy. The work does not argue the origins of society, human nature, or their relations, but it does draw broad lessons from Chinese history. Characterizing humanity and politics as constantly shifting, it treats rulership as a practical art responding to shifting events and personalities. While reflecting on failures and successes, it does not consider their situations and solutions as exactly repeatable. It offers guidance rather than aiming at "watertight techniques", which would be more akin to the aspirations of the "great progenitors of Rationalism", Descartes or Francis Bacon.

Advocating the practice of wu wei (non-action) primarily for rulers, the Han Feizi contrasts with later, more spiritual forms of Daoism as a practical state philosophy rejecting a 'permanent way of statecraft'. The Huang-Lao boshu developed a more metaphysical naturalist view, promoting a "predetermined natural order" for humanity. The Han Feizi only hints at such a view, affirming the Dao as "the standard of right and wrong". The Later Mohists and Han Fei moved away from an emphasis on heaven or nature, towards a man-made Sovereignty, a view affirmed by the Han Feizi's discussion of Shen Dao. Although Han Fei recalls Laozi, in this regard, Graham took them as moving in "parallel directions". Where Laozi sought to adapt to uncontrollable natural forces, the Han Feizi seeks the establishment of an "automatic" social order, with illustrations of scales, compasses and squares for "precise unimpugnable decisions."

Though not "completely endorsing" their methods, after "two millennia of narrating the past to harm the present, and adorning empty words to harm the substance," Hu Shih took Han Fei and Li Si as the "greatest statesmen in Chinese history", with a "brave spirit opposing those who 'do not make the present into their teacher but learn from the past'", and a political dictatorship less frightening than one adoring the past. Hu shih took Xun Kuang, Han Fei and Li Si as "champions of the idea of progress through conscious human effort", with Li Si abolishing the feudal system, unifying the empire, law, language, thought and belief, presenting a memorial to the throne in which he condemns all those who "refused to study the present and believed only in the ancients on whose authority they dared to criticize". With a quotation from Xun Kuang:

You glorify Nature and meditate on her: Why not domesticate and regulate her? You follow Nature and sing her praise: Why not control her course and use it? ... Therefore, I say: To neglect man's effort and speculate about Nature, is to misunderstand the facts of the universe.

Stressing timeliness, Sima Tan's description of the 'Dao school' says: "It (the Dao or way) shifts with the times and changes in response to things", a view earlier found in Han Fei and Xun Kuang. Hong Kong professor Liu Xiaogan takes Zhuangzi and Laozi to be more focused on "according with nature" than on timeliness. Sima Tan's description better fits what he called Huang-Lao, with followers theoretically defining the former in terms of the latter.

In contrast to Xun Kuang as the classically purported teacher of Han Fei and Li Si, Han Fei does not believe that a tendency to disorder demonstrates that people are evil or unruly. As a counterpoint, the Han Feizi and Shen Dao do still employ argumentative reference to 'sage kings'; the Han Feizi claims the distinction between the ruler's interests and private interests as said to date back to Cangjie, while government by Fa (standards) is said to date back to time immemorial, considering the demarcation between public and private a "key element" in the "enlightened governance" of the purported former kings.

== Doctrines of names ==
Combined with Shang Yang, the meaning of Xing "performance" was gradually lost as punishment, so that Shen Buhai would look more like Shang Yang. Popular in the Han dynasty, the Xunzi preceding the Han Feizi likely had a distortive effect. With a "Way of the Ruler" chapter like the Han Feizi, its introduction was the only work to use the term as "the names of punishments". Recalling Liu Xiang, Pei Yin's commentaries demonstrate some understanding of Shen Buhai again in the fifth century.

Though considering shu a later term, Creel largely reflects a traditional understanding of him, with shu techniques like controlling the levers of power, appearing inactive but acting decisively when needed, hiding motivations, power and intelligence to avoid exploitation, appointing by merit, thwarting ministerial power, and only giving orders that would likely be obeyed. The broader techniques contribute to a view of Shen Buhai as based in deception, present throughout the Han Feizi, but was focused on administration.

Recalling Shen Buhai, chapter 43 considered administrative standards or method (fa) necessary, differentiating it under the term shu 术 (administrative) technique. Shu is defined here as examining or testing the abilities of ministers, appointing candidates in accordance with their capabilities, holding ministerial achievements or "performance" (xing "forms") accountable to their proposals or "titles" (ming "names") as becoming offices, and grasping fast the handles of life and death in his own hands. Chapter 5 links the idea to the Way, while Xing-Ming as connected to reward and punishment is a doctrine of the Han Feizi's Chapter 7.

Though its later term is the Han Feizi's, retrospectively, Xing-Ming may be considered Shen Buhai "most important administrative contribution", in the sense referring to his line of practice. Arguably a central concept in the Han Feizi, it is at minimum a "crucial element". Sinologist Goldin compared it to a "bid for contracts", allowing ministers to appoint themselves to "titles", or offices. The Han Feizi's Chapters 5 "Way of the Ruler" and Chapter 7 "Two Handles" have examples of its doctrine, included under shu technique in chapter 43.

Creel argued: Han Fei from the late Hann state probably knows about his predecessor Shen Buhai, and past prime minister Shang Yang from the neighboring Qin. But the Han Feizi's Shang Yangian legal component is arguably more theoretical. The Han Feizi's chapter 5 introduction to its own version of Xing-Ming administration includes specific practical recommendations, and is not just theoretical. However, Han Fei likely would have considered its "impersonal governance" a suitable foundation for legal reform, as the Han Feizi says, once order is established.

Empty and inactive, he waits, making titles name themselves, and making assignments determine themselves. Those who have proposals produce their own titles, and those who have assignments produce their own performance. When performance and title match each other, the ruler does not need to be involved – he lets them revert to what they really are. Chapter 5 主道 The Way of the Ruler. Christoph Harbsmeier, 2025 ed. Østergaard Petersen and Yuri Pines

Monopolizing the Two Handles of reward and punishment to prevent usurpation, chapter 7's reward and punishment are dispensed based on the performance of bureaucratic roles. Their "most detailed application" is in connection with fa standards as promises ministers propose themselves. In older scholarship, this would make it an argument against older, primarily legal positivist interpretations of the work, developing out of a non-penal practice that would not have required law.

A sovereign who wants to suppress treachery must examine and match performance (the form, xing 形) and title (the name, ming 名). Performance and title refer to the difference between the proposal (言 speech) and the task. The minister lays out his proposal; the ruler assigns him the task according to his proposal, and solely on the basis of the task determines [the minister's] merit. Han Feizi Ch7. Chen Qiyou 2000

Sima Qian's inclusion of Shang Yang gives the impression he was familiar with the same doctrine; while there is no evidence Shang Yang literally studied Shen Buhai, the Book of Lord Shang does have "doctrines of names".

When the sage makes a law, he must make it clear and easily understandable. When the names (ming; words) are correct, both the ignorant and the knowledgeable can understand them. Book of Lord Shang Ch26. 故聖人為法，必使之明白易知，名正，愚知徧能知之

Sima Qian's Shiji attests the First Emperor as proclaiming Xing-Mings's practice. Though it is questionable that Xing-Ming was an integrated part of a legal system in Shen Buhai's time, it arguably is in Sima Qian's model of the Qin empire.

"The Qin (or "great") sage looks down at his state. In the beginning, he fixed Xing-Ming; manifested and displayed old statutes, started leveling laws and models, meticulously distinguished duties and tasks, so as to establish constancy and permanence" 秦(泰?)聖臨國，始定刑名，顯陳舊章，初平法式，審別任職，以立恒常. Sima Qian's Li Si, Shiji Ch63

=== Xing-Ming ===
Often recalled under it following the Han Feizi, Sima Qian (c. 145–c. 86 BCE) lists Shen Buhai, Han Fei and Shang Yang under the doctrine of Xing-Ming, or "form" and "name". Sima Qian attests Shen Buhai and Han Fei as favoring it, but rooted in Huang-Lao or "Yellow Emperor Daoism". Listing them under the Fa school, Liu Xiang (77–6B CE) still considered Shen Buhai's doctrine to be that of Xing-Ming, described as holding outcomes accountable to claims. Though later combined with Shang Yang, Han Fei names Shen Buhai as progenitor for his doctrine of Xing-Ming.

The term Xing is an example of a model or standard (fa), prominently dating back to Zhou texts taking King Wen of Zhou as a model. It still referred to models when Zichan used the term in his penal reforms. However, the Han Feizi states than Shen Buhai actually uses the earlier, more common philosophical equivalent, the Mohist "ming-shi", or name and reality, so that it likely originates in the name and reality debates of the Later Mohists (or "Neo-Mohists") and school of names (Xingmingjia). Before this, it likely goes back to the Confucian rectification of names, or cheng ming, a term Shen Buhai's fragments still used even if the later Han Feizi contrasts with it.

Liu Xiang (Pei Yin) recounts Shen Buhai's book as advocating Method rather than punishment. An early bureaucratic pioneer, Shen Buhai was not so much more advanced as he was more focused on bureaucracy. Though not its only example, the Han Feizi's discussion of Method (Technique, fa-shu) in Chapter 43 provides a basic explanation for Shu, saying: "Method is to confer office in accordance with a candidate's capabilities; to hold achievement (Xing forms) accountable to claim (Ming names); and to examine the ability of the assembled ministers." Though having a meritocratic goal, and at least potentially filtering ministers meritocratically, as presented by Han Fei Shu's central principle may have been Xing-Ming as accountability "more than anything else".

The Han Feizi's Xing-Ming method was likely the most 'mechanically' complex example of its kind for the period. Xun Kuang often has more specific criteria for the appointment of officials, but the Han Feizi's methods are "quite detailed." In this regard, the late Warring States theories of Xun Kuang and the Mohists were still far more generalized. Compared with Shen Buhai and the earlier Confucians, accountability is much more developed in the Han Feizi at the end of the Warring States period. Holding ministers accountable for their proposals, actions and performance, the Han Feizi ultimately names individual ministers to roles (e.g. "Steward of Cloaks" Chapter 7), forming into explicit roles to be performed by the ministers.

While Shen Buhai's has ideas corresponding more with matching proposals with duties, the late Guanzi has an example which A.C. Graham took as becoming closer to Han Fei's doctrine, ultimately matching office titles and duties.

Scrutinizing names. Scrutinize the object according to the name, fix the name depending on the object. Name and object give birth to each other, and reversing become each other's ch'ing ("the essential without which the object will not fit the name"). If name and object fit there is order, if not, disorder... Graham, Guanzi Ch55

With their doctrines scarcely visible in the early Han outside the Mawangdui silk texts, according to the Shiji, the practice emerged again under the Daoistic Emperor Wen of Han and his trusted ministers, but "cautious, unobtrusive and firm", more akin to Shen Buhai than Han Fei. Attributed back to Shen Buhai, it becomes the term for secretaries who had charge of records in penal decisions by the Han dynasty. With an early meaning of form, model or regulation, and fewer words in the Warring States period, the meaning of Xing (刑) is gradually lost as punishment.

By the later Han, scholars less knowledgeable than Liu Xiang were not always aware that Shen Buhai and Shang Yang differed. Early connected with Shen Buhai and school of names type figures as Method, Xing-Ming is sometimes used to refer to a combination of Shang Yang and Han Fei by the Han dynasty. Despite a potential contribution of its meritocratic ideas to the founding of the Imperial Examination, the meaning of Xing would ultimately be confused and lost in conflation with punishment (Xing 刑) by the time of the Western Qin, sometimes as early as the third century's Eastern Han. Likely unable to interpret the term, they become "the school of punishments" after the fall of the Han dynasty. Jin Zhuo would take it as a combination, and split it, assigning the Xingmingjia School of Forms and Names as the Mingjia School of Names, and those already classified as Fajia legalists as the Xingjia or school of punishments.

=== Xing-Ming (Daoism) ===
Informally associated by the Han Feizi with Laozi, the Han Feizi traces its specific idea of Xing-Ming back to Shen Buhai, likely going back to the name and reality debates of the Later Mohists, Xingming school of forms and names, and Confucian rectification of names, whose terms Shen Buhai still used even if the Han Fei contrasts with them. With the Qin's Book of Lord Shang only visibly intersecting central Chinese tradition with the Han Feizi, something akin to what Sima Qian termed a Huang-Lao "Daoism" would theoretically grow to dominance among the Chinese officialdom by the time of the Qin dynasty.

Sima Qian pairs the two, saying "Shenzi (Master Shen) was rooted in Huang-Lao (Daoism) and prioritized xingming." Sima Tan criticizes strict administrative practices in favor of his Daoism, but Han Fei does not develop mechanically strict Xing-Ming until the end of the Warring States period. Sima Tan clearly includes Xing-Ming as part of his Dao school (Daojia), in less technical terms.

When the congregation of ministers has assembled, the ruler lets each one state what he will do. If the actual result coincides with his claim this is known as the 'upright'; if the actual result (Xing "forms" for Han Fei) fails to coincide with his claim,(Ming) this is known as 'hollow'. Sima Tan

Contrasting with Laozi, Han Fei and Qin break from a Huang-Lao Daoist Xing-Ming, focusing on a Way of Heaven based on an inner reason of laws, inasmuch as they are more concerned with law as a means of control than whether it accords with a Way of Heaven. Han Fei refers to a Way of the Ruler or Sovereign. Shen Dao, the Huangdi Sijing, and Laozi still referred to a more conceptually "naturalist" Way of Heaven, and Shen Buhai's doctrine, with the Huainanzi it likely influenced, still believed in "not interfering with the natural tendency of names and affairs to manage themselves."

Together with a Huang-Lao tradition placing greater emphasis on (standards) fa, Sima Qian may have paired Laozi and Zhuangzi with Shen Buhai and Han Fei because the latter two "prioritized xingming", important in the recovered texts. The Sijing considering matching realities (Xing) with speech and the "names" of things (ming) an important part of "implementing the Way of Heaven", both in administrative and more general terms. While the Han Feizi's Way of the Ruler may not as directly emphasize concepts of Yin Yang, the Huangdi Sijing does. Analyzing Yin and Yang to ensure reliable results, it similarly matches "names" and "realities" (shi) as a practical way to appoint, monitor, and assess ministers.

Though by its own statements the Zhuangzi generally favors self cultivation, differing "dramatically" from prior chapters, the Outer Zhuangzi's Chapter 13 "Way of Heaven" gives secondary places to Xing-Ming administrative ideas akin to Shen Buhai. Emphasizing priorities in-order of wu wei, dao, de, benevolence, appointment and investigation, and finally reward and punishment, A.C. Graham interpreted its hierarchy as emphasizing the wu wei reduced activity of the ruler, mainly criticizing those who reverse its priorities. Not fully "Daoist" as later understood, it would generally be taken as reflecting early Huang-Lao or "syncretist" thought.

The Huainanzi's Zhushu, which Goldin translates as "Taking Shu as One's Ruler" or "Esteeming Technique", conveys naturalistic ideas akin to Shen Buhai in the same sense Liu Xiang recalled him, as "to follow and comply, and delegate responsibilities to one's subordinates."

"Names rectify themselves; affairs settle themselves. Thus he who has the Way grants names their autonomy but still rectifies them; he follows affairs but still settles them." Shen Buhai "The Great Body"

Each name names itself, each category categorizes itself. Things are so of themselves; [the ruler] lets nothing emerge from himself. Huainanzi "Zhushu"

== Eradicating punishments ==
In the period preceding unification, Qin laws diverged significantly from ideas espoused in Book of Lord Shang (Shangjunshu): while retaining Shang Yang's reforms, the Qin abandoned his anti-Confucianism and strict, harsh penal policy, and ultimately his heavy emphasis on agriculture. After Shang Yang, King Huiwen of Qin is attested as having pardoned the death penalty in a case involving murder, based on Confucian ethics. Sima Qian depicts Qin Shi Huang as emphasising law and order, praising himself as a "sage ruler of benevolence and righteousness ... who cares for and pities the common people". A major reform of the primarily administrative Qin dynasty focuses on restraining ministers, instituting office divisions that cannot punish at will.

Translator Yuri Pines takes the final chapter (26) of the Shangjunshu as reflecting the administrative practices of the late pre-imperial and Imperial Qin dynasty, aligning with knowledge of Qin governance. Although written as an interview with Shang Yang, its recommendations would have been too sophisticated for his time. The chapter proposes setting up offices of strictly trained legal experts at the central, provincial, and local levels, tasked with answering all questions posed by the people and officials. With the degrees of minor officials kept simpler, responses would be strictly controlled through double-entry registration, with one half given to the inquirer, and the other filed in sealed archives for retrieval. Cases would have to be judged in accordance with the previous responses.

Though intended more to promulgate the law and governance of the sovereign than safeguard the rights of citizens in a modern sense, it requires their cooperation. Protecting the people from ministerial abuse becomes more important than punishing them. Taken as universally beneficial, in an attempt to achieve the "blessed eradication of punishments through punishments", clear laws are taught that the people can use against ministers abusing the statutes. Punishing the ministers according to the penalties of the statute abused, archival corruption by the legal experts could be punishable up to the death penalty. Han Fei makes similar recommendations, but compared with the late part of the Shangjunshu he may not yet have developed the idea or concern of legal mechanisms for protecting people from the bureaucrats, he is more focused on accomplishing order through the administrative power of the ruler.

If, as depicted, at least part of the Han Feizi dates to the late Warring States period, the Shangjunshu could have circulated on the eve of unification. The work's adoption by the Han Feizi can give the appearance of a living current for the old harsh punishments of Shang Yang that can mistakenly be imposed backward. Een if the Shangjunshu only passingly suggests that a need for punishment would pass away, the Qin nonetheless abandoned Shang Yang's heavy punishments. The Book of Lord Shang itself is not a homogeneous ideology, but shifts substantially over its development. As the work's first reference, the Han Feizi recalls its earlier Chapter 4, saying:

Gongsun Yang said: "When [the state] implements punishments, inflicts heavy [punishments] on light [offenses]: then light [offenses] will not come, and heavy [crimes] will not arrive. This is called: 'eradicating punishments with punishments'.

Despite what might be assumed from associated texts, the Qin "were not extraordinarily severe for their time", and form a continuity with the early Han dynasty, abolishing mutilations in 167 BCE. In the heavy degrees of punishment, the Qin's mutilating punishments include tattooing, nose cutting, and foot cutting, but the latter two are only mentioned infrequently, decreasing over time. Heavy labor is most common. After sentence, mutilating punishments in the Qin and early Han were then commonly pardoned or redeemed in exchange for fines, labor or one to several aristocratic ranks, even up to the death penalty. Depending on severity and circumstances, sentencing may skip over mutilating punishment directly to a mutually preferential sentence of labor, thereafter potentially pardoning them into a period of borderlands military defense service.

Not the most common punishments, the Qin's mutilating punishment likely exist in part to create labor in agriculture, husbandry, workshops, and wall building. Replacing mutilation at lower level heavy punishment, labor from one to five years becomes the common heavy punishment in early Imperial China, generally in building roads and canals, with only a minority going to build the Great Wall. As a component of general colonization, the most common heavier punishment becomes expulsion to the new colonies, with exile considered a heavy punishment. The Han engage in the same practice, transferring criminals to the frontiers for military service, with Emperor Wu and later emperors recruiting men sentenced to death for expeditionary armies. Dong Zhongshu criticizes the Qin for failing to punish criminals, but exile itself as a heavy punishment in ancient China dates back to at least the Spring and Autumn period.

Han-era writer Dong Zhongshu (179–104 BCE) considered Qin officials and taxes severe, but did not characterise punishments as such; in fact, Dong criticized the Qin system for its inability to punish criminals. Aiming to reduce punishment to a minimum, the idea of redemption can be found in the Analects of Confucius, attempting to ensure a correct application of the rectification of names.

=== Han Feizi ===
For Han Fei, the power structure is unable to tolerate an autonomous ministerial practice of reward and punishment. Han Fei mainly targets ministerial infringements. A main argument by the Han Feizi's for punishment by standards, Chapter 7's The Two Handles, is that delegating reward and punishment to ministers has led to an erosion of power and collapse of states in his era, and should be monopolized, using severe punishment in an attempt to abolish ministerial infringements, and therefore punishment. Monopolization can be considered a core of Han Fei's practice of fa laws and methods, aiming to prevent usurpation.

Mostly concerned with the ministers, Han Fei does not regard the people as an enemy, as the earlier part of the Book of Lord Shang did. The Han Feizi occasionally even has ideas of public good. "Preventing the strong from exploiting the weak" will benefit the sage ruler Han Fei addresses, but also the elderly and the orphan. While Han Fei believes that a benevolent government that does not punish will harm the law, and create confusion, he also believes that a violent and tyrannical ruler will create an irrational government, with conflict and rebellion. For this reason, the Han Feizi also opposes corvée, with hardship turning the people toward powerful ministers to the detriment of the ruler and state.

Shen Dao, the first member of Han Fei's triad between the figures in the later chapters, never suggests kinds of punishments, as that was not the point. The point in Shen Dao's framework was that it would involve the ruler too much to decide them personally, exposing him to resentment. The ruler should decide punishments using fa standards. Han Fei does not suggest kinds of punishments either, and would not seem to care about punishment as retribution itself. He only cares whether they work, and therefore end punishments.

Although "benevolence and righteousness" may simply be "glittering words", other means can potentially be included. While recalling Shang Yang, Han Fei places a more equal emphasis on reward to encourage people and produce good results; punishment for him was secondary to simply controlling ministers through techniques. Although these could be expected to include espionage in his time, they consisted primarily simply in written agreements.

=== Justice ===
Emphasizing a dichotomy between the people and state, the Book of Lord Shang in particular has been regarded as anti-people, with alienating statements that a weak people makes a strong military. But, such statements are concentrated in a few chapters, and the work does still vacillate against ministerial abuses. Michael Loewe still regarded the laws as primarily concerned with peace and order. They were harsh in Shang Yang's time, mainly out of hope that people will no longer dare to break them.

Sima Qian argues the Qin dynasty, relying on rigorous laws, as nonetheless insufficiently rigorous for a completely consistent practice, suggesting them as not having always delivered justice as others understood it. From a modern perspective, it is "impossible" to deny at least the "'basic' justice of Qin laws". Rejecting the whims of individual ministers in favor of clear protocols, and insisting on forensic examinations, for an ancient society they are ultimately more definable by fairness than cruelty.

With contradicting evidence, as a last resort, officials could rely on beatings, but these had to be reported and compared with evidence, and they could not actually punish without a confession. With administration and the judiciary not separated in ancient societies, the Qin developed the idea of the judge magistrate as a detective, emerging in the culture of early Han dynasty theater with judges as detectives aspiring to truth as justice.

Inasmuch as Han Fei has modernly been related with the idea of justice, he opposes the early Confucian idea that ministers should be immune to penal law. With an at least incidental concern for the people, the Han Feizi is "adamant that blatant manipulation and subversion of law to the detriment of the state and ruler should never be tolerated":

Those men who violated the laws, committed treason, and carried out major acts of evil always worked through some eminent and highly placed minister. And yet the laws and regulations are customarily designed to prevent evil among the humble and lowly people, and it is upon them alone that penalties and punishments fall. Hence, the common people lose hope and are left with no place to air their grievances. Meanwhile, the high ministers band together and work as one man to cloud the vision of the ruler.

== Legacy ==
Chapters 43 and 40 of the Han Feizi shaped an early modern elementalizing view of Shen Buhai as focused on Shu (technique), Shen Dao on Shi (power), and Shang Yang on law, uncritically taking the Han Feizi as superseding the others. But Shen Dao's fragments suggest he was also focused more on fa.

Legalism has been cited by scholars and commentators as having ideological influence on the current governance of the People's Republic of China, particularly under the general secretaryship of Xi Jinping. Scholar Sam Crane has referred to the modern Chinese state as "Confucianism on the outside, Legalist on the inside."

Deng Xiaoping's slogan "a cat is a good cat if it can catch rats, no matter it is a white or a black cat" has been compared with the Han Feizi.

== Sources ==
- Chan, Alan K. L. (1991). Alan K. L. Chan (ed.). Two Visions of the Way. State University of New York. ISBN 9780791498729.
- Chang, Leo S. (1998). The Four Political Treatises of the Yellow Emperor: Original Mawangdui Texts with Complete English Translations and an Introduction. Society for Asian and Comparative Philosophy. Monograph No.15. University of Hawaiʻi Press.
- Chang, Wejun (2016). In Search of the Way: Legal Philosophy of the Classic Chinese Thinkers. Edinburgh University Press. ISBN 9781474412971.
- Ching, Julia (1991). Mythology and Archaeology in Ancient China. Hong Kong: Chinese University Press. ISBN 9789622014695.
- Creel, Herrlee Glessner (1982) [1970]. What Is Taoism?: And Other Studies in Chinese Cultural History. University of Chicago Press. ISBN 9780226120478. JSTOR 1397689. OCLC 1256745090 – via Google Books.
- Creel, Herrlee Glessner (1974). Shen Pu-hai: Chinese Political Philosopher of the Fourth Century B.C. University of Chicago Press. ISBN 978-0-226-12027-0.
- Cua, Antonio S. (2003). Encyclopedia of Chinese Philosophy. Routledge. ISBN 9781135367480.
- Duyvendak, J. J. L. (1928). The Book of Lord Shang: A Classic of the Chinese School of Law. London: Arthur Probsthain.
- Emerson, John (2013). Shen Dao: Text, Translation, and Study. Éditions Le Real. OCLC 911414271.
- Fraser, Chris (2011). Oxford Handbook of World Philosophy. Oxford University Press. ISBN 978-0-19-532899-8.
- Fraser, Chris (2023). "Mohism". In Zalta, Edward N.; Nodelman, Uri (eds.). Stanford Encyclopedia of Philosophy (Fall 2023 ed.).
- Goldin, Paul R. (2005). After Confucius: Studies In Early Chinese Philosophy. University of Hawaii Press. ISBN 978-0-8248-2842-4.
  - Goldin, Paul R. (2005a), "Insidious Syncretism in the Political Philosophy of Huainanzi", University of Hawai'i Press, pp. 90–111, doi:10.1515/9780824873998-008, ISBN 978-0-8248-7399-8
- Goldin, Paul R. (2011). "Persistent Misconceptions about Chinese "Legalism"" (PDF). Journal of Chinese Philosophy. 38 (1): 88–104.
- Goldin, Paul R. (2012). Dao Companion to the Philosophy of Han Fei. Dao Companions to Chinese Philosophy. University of Pennsylvania: Springer. ISBN 978-0-19-760347-5.
  - Goldin, Paul R. (2013), Introduction: Han Fei and the Han Feizi. In: Dao Companion to the Philosophy of Han Fei (PDF), Springer, pp. 1–21, ISBN 978-9-400-74318-2 – via The University of Pennsylvania
  - Pines, Yuri (2013), Submerged by Absolute Power: The Ruler's Predicament in the Han Feizi. In: Dao Companion to the Philosophy of Han Fei (PDF), pp. 67–86, doi:10.1007/978-94-007-4318-2_4, ISBN 978-94-007-4317-5
- Graham, A.C. (1989). Disputers of the Tao: Philosophical Argument in Ancient China. Open Court. ISBN 978-0-8126-9942-5.
- Hansen, Chad (1992). A Daoist Theory of Chinese Thought. Oxford: Oxford University Press. ISBN 978-0-19-535076-0.
- Hansen, Chad (July 1994). "Fa (Standards: Laws) and Meaning Changes in Chinese Philosophy". Philosophy East and West. 44 (3): 435–488. doi:10.2307/1399736. JSTOR 1399736.
- Hansen, Chad (2020). "Daoism". In Zalta, Edward N.; Nodelman, Uri (eds.). Stanford Encyclopedia of Philosophy (Fall 2020 ed.).
- Hansen, Chad (2024b). "Daoism". In Zalta, Edward N.; Nodelman, Uri (eds.). Stanford Encyclopedia of Philosophy (Summer 2024 ed.).
- Hansen, Chad (2024). "Zhuangzi". In Zalta, Edward N.; Nodelman, Uri (eds.). Stanford Encyclopedia of Philosophy (Summer 2024 ed.).
- Harbsmeier, Christoph (2024b). Han Feizi, the Art of Statecraft in Early China (Vol.2): A Bilingual Edition. Brill. ISBN 9789004723535.
- Harris, Eirik Lang (2016). The Shenzi Fragments. New York: Columbia University Press. ISBN 9780231542166.
- Harris, Eirik L. (2024). "Early Chinese Political Realists: From Shen Buhai to Han Fei". In Rogacz, Dawid; Ambrogio, Selusi (eds.). Chinese Philosophy and Its Thinkers. Volume I: Chinese Ancient and Early Imperial Philosophy. Bloomsbury Academic. ISBN 9781350263543.
- Hou, Wailu (1962) [1957]. Zhōngguó sīxiǎng tōngshǐ (中国思想通史) (in Chinese). Vol. 1 (1st (5th printing) ed.). Beijing: Renmin Chubanshe (人民出版社). CSBN 2001.77.
- Hsiao, Kung-Chuan (1979). A History of Chinese Political Thought. Princeton University Press. ISBN 978-0-691-61289-8.
- Hsieh, S.Y. (1985). "The Legalist Philosophers". In Barlow, Jeffrey G.; Bishop, Donald H. (eds.). Chinese Thought: An Introduction. Motilal Banarsidass. ISBN 9780836411300.
- Hsin-Wen, Lee (2024). The Bloomsbury Handbook of Global Justice and East Asian Philosophy. Bloomsbury Publishing. ISBN 9781350327474.
- Klein, Esther (2010). "Were There "Inner Chapters" in the Warring States? A New Examination of Evidence about the Zhuangzi". T'oung Pao. 96 (4/5): 299–369. JSTOR 41354706.
- Leung, Vincent S. (2019). The Politics of the Past in Early China. Cambridge: Princeton University Press. ISBN 978-1-108-42572-8.
- Kejian, Huang (2016). From Destiny to Dao. Davies Pacific Center: Enrich Professional Publishing. ISBN 978-1-62320-023-7.
- Huang, Ray (1997) [1988]. China: A Macro History. M.E. Sharpe. ISBN 978-1563247316.
- Jiang, Tao (2021). Origins of Moral-political Philosophy in Early China. Oxford: Oxford University Press. ISBN 978-0-19-760347-5.
- Lewis, Mark Edward (1999). Writing and Authority in Early China. State University of New York Press. doi:10.1353/pew.2001.0006. ISBN 978-0-7914-4114-5.
- Lewis, Mark Edward (2010) [2007]. The Early Chinese Empires: Qin and Han (History of Imperial China). Harvard University Press. ISBN 978-0-674-05734-0.
- Liao, W.K. (1939). The Complete Works of Han Fei Tzu. Arthur Probsthain.
- Liu Xiaogan (1994). Classifying the Zhuangzi Chapters. Michigan Monographs in Chinese Studies, vol. 65. Ann Arbor: University of Michigan Press. doi:10.3998/mpub.19186. ISBN 9780472901340.
- Liu, Xiaogan (2014). Xiaogan Liu (ed.). Dao Companion to Daoist Philosophy. Dao Companions to Chinese Philosophy. Springer. ISBN 9789048129270.
- Loewe, Michael (1986) [1978]. The Cambridge History of China, Vol. 1: The Ch'in and Han Empires, 221 BC-AD 220. Cambridge: Cambridge University Press. ISBN 978-0-521-24327-8.
- Loewe, Michael (1999). The Cambridge History of Ancient China. Cambridge University Press. ISBN 978-0-521-47030-8.
- Loewe, Michael (2011). Dong Zhongshu, a "Confucian" Heritage and the Chunqiu Fanlu. Brill. ISBN 9789004194656.
- Lundahl, Bertil (1992). Lundahl, Bertil (ed.). Han Fei Zi: The Man and the Work. Institute of Oriental Languages, Stockholm University. ISBN 9789171530790.
- Makeham, John (1990). "The Legalist Concept of Hsing-ming: An Example of the Contribution of Archaeological Evidence to the Re-Interpretation of Transmitted Texts". Monumenta Serica. 39: 87–114. doi:10.1080/02549948.1990.11731214.
- Makeham, John (1994). Name and Actuality in Early Chinese Thought. State University of New York Press. ISBN 978-1-4384-1174-3.
- Mou, Bo (2008). Routledge History of Chinese Philosophy. Taylor & Francis. ISBN 978-1-134-24937-4.
- Needham, Joseph (1978) [1954]. The Shorter Science and Civilisation in China: Volume 1. Cambridge University Press. ISBN 9780521292863.
- Peerenboom, Randall (1993). Law and Morality in Ancient China. The Silk Manuscripts of Huang-Lao. State University of New York Press. ISBN 9780791412381.
- Pines, Yuri (2009). Envisioning Eternal Empire. University of Hawaii Press. ISBN 978-0-8248-3275-9.
- Pines, Yuri (2012). The Everlasting Empire. Princeton University Press. ISBN 9780691134956.
- Pines, Yuri (2012b). "Alienating Rhetoric in the Book of Lord Shang and its Moderation". Extrême-Orient Extrême-Occident. 34 (34). Presses Universitaires de Vincennes: 79–110. doi:10.4000/extremeorient.254. ISBN 9782842923525. JSTOR 42636065.
- Pines, Yuri (2014). Birth of an Empire. University of California Press. ISBN 978-1-938169-07-6.
  - Pines, Yuri. "Ch. 8. The Messianic Emperor". In Pines (2014b), pp. 258-279.
- Pines, Yuri (2017). The Book of Lord Shang: Apologetics of State Power in Early China. Columbia University Press. ISBN 9780231542333.
- Pines, Yuri (2019). The Book of Lord Shang: Apologetics of State Power in Early China. Abridged Edition. Columbia University Press. ISBN 978-0-231-55038-3.
- Pines, Yuri (2020). "Worth vs. Power: Han Fei's "Objection to Positional Power" Revisited" (PDF). Asiatische Studien - Études Asiatiques. 74 (3): 687–710. doi:10.1515/asia-2019-0040. S2CID 229017346.
- Pines, Yuri (2023). "Legalism in Chinese Philosophy". In Zalta, Edward N.; Nodelman, Uri (eds.). Stanford Encyclopedia of Philosophy (Summer 2023 ed.).
  - Pines, Yuri (2023a), 1. Defining the fa Tradition, Stanford Encyclopedia of Philosophy
  - Pines, Yuri (2023n), 5. The Ruler. In: Legalism in Chinese Philosophy, Stanford Encyclopedia of Philosophy
  - Pines, Yuri (2023o), 5.1 The Ruler's Superiority. In: Legalism in Chinese Philosophy, Stanford Encyclopedia of Philosophy
  - Pines, Yuri (2023r), 7. Epilogue: Legalism in Chinese History. In: Legalism in Chinese Philosophy, Stanford Encyclopedia of Philosophy
- Pines, Yuri (2024). Dao Companion to China's fa Tradition. Dao Companions to Chinese Philosophy. Hebrew University of Jerusalem: Springer. ISBN 9783031536304.
  - Pines, Yuri (2024a), Introduction: The fa Tradition in Chinese Philosophy. In: Pines, Y. (eds) Dao Companion to China's fa Tradition, Springer, Cham, pp. 1–20, doi:10.1007/978-3-031-53630-4_1
  - Pines, Yuri (2024b), Chapter 1. Shang Yang and The Book of Lord Shang. In: Pines, Y. (eds) Dao Companion to China's fa Tradition (PDF), Springer, Cham, pp. 23–56, doi:10.2307/600068, JSTOR 600068
  - Yu, Zhong. "Chapter 2. On Shen Buhai's Legal Thought". In Pines (2024), pp. 57-82.
  - Sato, Masayuki. "Chapter 5. The Concept of fa in Guanzi and Its Evolution". In Pines (2024), pp. 139-180.
  - Pines, Yuri (2024c), Chapter 4. Han Feizi: The World Driven by Self-Interest. In: Pines, Y. (eds) Dao Companion to China's fa Tradition (PDF), Dao Companions to Chinese Philosophy, Springer, Cham, pp. 99–138, doi:10.1007/978-3-031-53630-4_5, ISBN 9783031536298
  - Song, Hongbing (2024), Chapter 9. Two Perspectives on the fa Tradition: Politics Versus the Rule of Impartial Standards. In: Pines, Y. (eds) Dao Companion to China's fa Tradition. Dao Companions to Chinese Philosophy, vol 19., Springer, Cham, pp. 265–294, doi:10.1007/978-3-031-53630-4_10
  - Lewis, Mark Edward. "Chapter 11 The Ruler in the Polity of Objective Standards". In Pines (2024), pp. 315-349.
  - McLeod, Alexus. "Chapter 15. The Fa Tradition and Morality". In Pines (2024), pp. 433-456.
  - Song, Hongbing. "Chapter 16. The Historical Reputation of the Fa Tradition in Imperial China". In Pines (2024b), pp. 459–485.
  - Jiang, Tao. "Chapter 19 Fajia and the Mohists". In Pines (2024), pp. 547–573.
  - Wang, Pei. "Chapter 20. Laozi, Huang-Lao and the fa Tradition: Thinking Through the Term xingming 刑名". In Pines (2024), pp. 575-594.
  - Bai, Tongdong. "Chapter 23. The Han Feizi and Its Contemporary Relevance". In Pines (2024), pp. 645-676.
- Rubin, Vitali (1974). "Shen Tao and Fa-Chia". Journal of the American Oriental Society. 94 (3): 337–346. doi:10.2307/600068. JSTOR 600068.
- Schneider, Henrique (2013). "Han Fei, De, Welfare". Asian Philosophy. 23 (3): 260–274. doi:10.1080/09552367.2013.807584.
- Schneider, Henrique (2018). An Introduction to Hanfei's Political Philosophy. Lady Stephenson Library, Newcastle upon Tyne: Cambridge Scholars Publishing. ISBN 978-1-5275-0812-5.
- Schwartz, Benjamin (1985). The World of Thought in Ancient China. Harvard: Harvard University Press. ISBN 978-0-674-96191-3.
- Shaughnessy, Edward L. (2023). A Brief History of Ancient China. Bloomsbury Publishing. ISBN 9780226120478.
- Shih, Hu (2013). English Writings of Hu Shih. Volume 2. Princeton University: Foreign Language Teaching and Research Press. ISBN 978-3-642-31180-2.
- Shih, Hu (2015). An Outline of the History of Chinese Philosophy (Chinese Edition) 中国哲学史大纲[胡适作品系列]. Democracy and Construction Publishing House. ISBN 978-7513906678.
  - Shih, Hu (2015b), Part Twelve Chapter Two. 第二章 所谓法家
- Smith, Kidder (2003). "Sima Tan and the Invention of Daoism, "Legalism," et cetera". The Journal of Asian Studies. 62 (1): 129–156. doi:10.2307/3096138. JSTOR 3096138.
- Vandermeersch, Léon (1987) [1965]. La formation du légisme. École française d'Extrême-Orient. ISBN 2855395410.
- Waley, Arthur (1982) [1939]. Three ways of thought in ancient China. Stanford University Press. ISBN 9780804711692.
- Waley, Arthur (2012) [1939]. Three ways of thought in ancient China. Taylor & Francis. ISBN 9781135652036.
- Watson, Burton (1962) [1962]. Early Chinese Literature. Columbia University Press. ISBN 9780231086714.
- Watson, Burton (1996). Xunzi: Basic writings. Columbia University Press. ISBN 9780231521321.
- Wilkinson, Endymion, ed. (2015). Chinese History: A New Manual. Harvard. ISBN 978-0-674-08846-7.
- Winston, Kenneth (2005). "The Internal Morality of Chinese Legalism". Singapore Journal of Legal Studies: 313–347.
- Youlan, Feng (1976) [1948]. A Short History of Chinese Philosophy. Free Press. ISBN 978-0-684-83634-8.
- Zhang, Jinfan (2014). The Tradition and Modern Transition of Chinese Law. Heidelberg; New York; Dordrecht; London: Springer. doi:10.1007/978-3-642-23266-4. ISBN 978-3-642-23265-7.
