= Zhu Shizhe =

Chinese scholar

Zhu Shizhe (simplified Chinese: 朱师辙; traditional Chinese: 朱師轍; pinyin: Zhū Shīzhé; Wade–Giles: Chu Shih-che, born 1879, died 1969 in Hangzhou) with the courtesy name Shaobin (少濱), was a Chinese scholar who is known for his book on the Book of Lord Shang (Shangjun shu) and his biographical contributions to the Draft History of Qing (Qingshi gao).

== Life and work ==
His ancestral home was in Suzhou (苏州) and he was born in Yi County, Anhui Province, China. His grandfather Zhu Junsheng (朱駿聲) and father Zhu Kongzhang (朱孔彰) were both scholars of the late Qing dynasty. Zhu Shizhe wrote over 100 biographies for the work Qingshi gao (清史稿 / "Draft History of the Qing Dynasty"). Later, he taught at Beiping Furen University (北平辅仁大学) and at the Chinese University (中国大学). He was friends with figures such as Chen Yinke (陳寅恪) and Xian Yuqing (冼玉清); Chen Yinke even dedicated the poem “An Zhu Shaobin in Hangzhou” (Jihuai Hangzhou Zhu Shaobin 寄懷杭州朱少濱) to him. His works include: Huangshan qiaochang (黄山樵唱), Qingshi shuwen (清史述聞), Shangjun shu jiegu (商君书解诂), and He Qingzhen ci (和清真词).

The Hanyu da zidian for example uses his Shangjun shu jiegu dingben 商君书解诂定本 [Exposition and Definitive Text of the Book of Lord Shang] (definitive edition, Guji chubanshe 古籍出版社, 1956).

Regarding the situation of the compilation of the Qingshi gao, Zhu Shizhe is quoted as follows:

列传撰人甚多，在馆诸人，几人人皆有。以余论，虽以咸同列传为主，而康乾以来各朝，皆曾补撰。盖每朝皆出于众手，惟每朝有主体撰人；又重修整时，归何人为主，则其负责为多。

In the biographies (liezhuan), there are many authors; among the scholars at the academy, almost everyone contributed something. In my view, although the biographies are generally treated uniformly, since the time of Kangxi and Qianlong, each dynasty has made its own additions. Each dynasty is therefore the work of many hands, but each has a main author; and when the works are thoroughly revised, it depends on who is the principal responsible person – that person bears most of the responsibility.

== Works ==
- Huangshan qiaochang 黄山樵唱
- Qingshi shuwen 清史述聞
- Shangjun shu jiegu 商君书解诂

Shangjun shu jiegu dingben 商君书解诂定本 (Guji chubanshe 古籍出版社, 1956)

- He Qingzhen ci 和清真词
