= The Book of Lord Shang =

3rd-century BCE Chinese legalist text

- Traditional Chinese: 商君書
- Simplified Chinese: 商君书
Transcriptions
Standard Mandarin
- Hanyu Pinyin: Shāng jūn shū
- Gwoyeu Romatzyh: Shang jiun shu
- Wade–Giles: Shang^{1} chün^{1} shu^{1}
- IPA: [ʂáŋ tɕýn ʂú]
Yue: Cantonese
- Yale Romanization: Sēung gwān syū
- Jyutping: Soeng^{1} gwan^{1} syu^{1}
- IPA: [sœŋ˥ kʷɐn˥ sy˥]
Southern Min
- Hokkien POJ: Siong kun chhu
- Tâi-lô: Siong kun tshu
Old Chinese
- Baxter–Sagart (2014): *s-taŋ C.qur s-ta

The Book of Lord Shang (traditional Chinese: 商君書; simplified Chinese: 商君书; pinyin: Shāng jūn shū) is an ancient Chinese text from the 3rd century BC, regarded as a foundational work of "Chinese Legalism". The earliest surviving of such texts (the second being the Han Feizi), it is named for and to an extent attributed to major Qin reformer Shang Yang, who served as minister to Duke Xiao of Qin (r. 361 – 338 BC) from 359 BC until his death in 338 BC and is generally considered to be the father of that state's "legalism".

The Book of Lord Shang includes many ordinances, essays, and courtly petitions attributed to Shang Yang, as well as discourses delivered at the Qin court. The book focuses mainly on maintaining societal order through a system of impartial laws that strictly mete out rewards and punishments for citizens' actions. The first chapters advise promoting agriculture and suppressing other low-priority secondary activities, as well as encouraging martial virtues for use in creating and maintaining a state army for wars of conquest.

== Title ==
The Book of Lord Shang, also known as Shangzi 商子 "Master Shang", was originally simply titled "Lord Shang" "Shang jun 商君" in the Book of Han's catalogue, with 29 chapters. It is said to have gained the title "Book of Lord Shang" (Shang jun shu) after Liu Bei instructed his son to read it. The New Book of Tang's catalogue used its new name, also noting the alternative Shangzi title.

The Book of Han also listed an alternative 27 chapter text Gongsun Yang 公孫鞅. This book was instead included in the strategists subsection of military books, alongside Sun Wu (Sun Tzu), Wu Qi, and Sun Bin. As discussed together in the Shiji Biographies of Mencius and Xunzi:

"The State of Qin employed Shang Jun, enriching the state and strengthening its military forces; Chu and Wei employed Wu Qi, achieving victories over weaker enemies; Qi Weiwang and Xuanwang used Sunzi, Tian Ji, and others."

== Premodern skepticism ==
Historically, the first chapter of the Book of Lord Shang has been especially associated with Shang Yang, purportedly portraying the court debate that saw Shang Yang gain office. But it refers to the King as "Duke Xiao", his posthumous title, and Yuri Pines dates it as possibly later than many subsequent chapters. In the evaluation of modern translator Yuri Pines, while some of the Book of Lord Shang came from Shang Yang's life time, or shortly thereafter, it likely took over a century to write, with Chapter 15 in particular having long been contested as dating eighty years after his death.

Even in Imperial China, Huang Zhen of the Southern Song dynasty did not believe the work to have been written by Shang Yang himself, with his biography in the Shiji suggesting him to have been a 'more gifted law official' than the Book of Lord Shang. The Siku Quanshu Zongmu Tiyao claimed that early legalist thinkers compiled the work rather than Shang Yang. Though a few chapters may have been written by Shang Yang himself, in this regard, modern scholarship is largely in line with older Chinese opinion.

As noted by the early scholarship of J.J.L. Duyvendak, apart from the work's stylistic inconsistencies, most of it would unlikely have been written by Shang Yang himself if, as Sima Qian states, he was executed almost immediately after resigning from office. References to events from the end part of the Warring States period, and skepticism during the imperial period, contributed to a dismissive attitude toward the work during the Republican period (1912-1949) as compared with the Han Feizi, taking the entire work as late.

== Intellectual current ==
Taking Shang Yang as a common referent, it is commonly accepted in modern scholarship that the Book of Lord Shang was produced by Shang Yang and his followers. Together, they are referred to in Chinese-Asian scholarship as "Shang Yang's school" (xuepai 學派 or school of thought), whose term has been "hugely popular" since Malaysian sinologist Zheng Liangshu (1940–2016) 1989 work, Shang Yang and His School, or "Qin Legalists", including by Beijing sinologist Lin Cunguang 2014.

Though not considered as self-aware or organized a 'school' as the Confucians or Mohists, Pines believes that "some chapters were likely penned by Shang Yang himself; others may "come from the hand of his immediate disciples and followers". While the work's composite nature contributes to skepticism, Pines considered it more ideologically consistent than most Warring States texts, and "highly coherent in terms of its style, lexicon, and basic ideas", including a "subtle dialogue among different chapters" reflecting the evolution of Zheng Liangshu termed Shang Yang's 'intellectual current' (xuepai 學派) as translated by Pines.

== Dating ==
Pages from a printed edition of The Book of Lord Shang

Pines dating for the work's chapters range from pre-300 BCE (Chapter 1) to 230 BCE, near the time of the Qin state's unification of China. He actually places chapter 1 later (300 BCE), dating a number of subsequent chapters up to 22 ranging in content as early as circa 360 BCE (?).

The work matures philosophically in chapters 6 (Calculating the Land) and 7 (Opening the Blocked), becomes more administrative and accommodating in chapter 14 (Cultivation of Authority), and has its more sophisticated chapters at the end of its work, chapters 24 (Interdicting and Encouraging) and 25 (Attention to Law), with Chapter 26 (Fixing Divisions) "reflecting administrative realities from the eve of imperial unification."

=== Individual chapters ===
While Shang Yang's reforms included peasant levies, chariots were already being exchanged for primarily infantry even before the Warring States period, in the sixth century b.c., with cavalry becoming only supplemental. Not making use of cavalry, Pines believes that military chapters like 10, 11 and 19 definitely did come from the fourth century B.C..

Guo Moruo believed that Chapter 15 “Attracting the People” makes reference to the Changping campaign of the 47th year of King Zhaoxiang of Qin, 82 years after Shang Yang’s death, so that Guo Muruo believed the Book of Lord Shang was a forgery. Tong Weimin (2016) dates it 78 years after Shang Yang, in King Zhaoxiang's reign, arguing that it is a legitimate work of a follower of Shang Yang stemming from Shang Yang favoring immigration.

== Changing with the times ==
Like the later Han Feizi, the Book of Lord Shang insists on the anachronism of the policies of the distant past, drawing on more recent history. In comparison with the Han Feizi, though considering them to be "digressions of minor importance", Pines Stanford Encyclopedia of Philosophy believes the Book of Lord Shang "allowed for the possibility that the need for excessive reliance on coercion would end and a milder, morality-driven political structure would evolve." In Pines opinion, the Han Feizi does not. Without implying any direct connection, Michael Puett and Mark Edward Lewis compared the Rites of Zhou to the "Legalism" of Shang Yang.

== Doctrine of Names ==
Following the Han Feizi, discussing Shang Yang and Shen Buhai, the three together were often identified under the Han Feizi's doctrine of Xing-Ming, or "form and name", for distinguishing office. The Shiji would introduce Shang Yang as having an interest in the discipline of forms and names. Nothing would seem to bear out that Shang Yang studied an identical "Names" doctrine to Shen Buhai and Han Fei, but it does have "Names" doctrine.

Pines considers Shang Yang's primary doctrine to be that of connecting people's inborn nature (Qing) or dispositions (different Xing) with names (ming 名). The Book of Lord Shang does not believe that fa laws will be successful without "investigating the people's disposition", recommending enacting laws that allow people to "pursue the desire for a name", namely fame and high social status, or just wealth if acceptable. Ensuring these "names" are connected with actual benefits, it was hoped people would be less likely to commit crimes, and more likely to engage in hard work or fight in wars.

Ming names in the work most commonly refers to repute and social status. In Chapter 26 (“Fixing divisions”) however, it refers to legal codes and, "more frequently, something akin to a proper bureaucratic nomenclature". Making use of the per-imperially rare term mingfen (名分) as the "essence of legal and administrative practices", fen refers to such things as "social divisions, distinctions", and individual allotment."

== Meritocracy (Ch.6) ==
Sima Qian introduces Shang Yang as "an expert in the doctrine of performance and official charge (xingming 刑名: the proper match between the two as the measurement of an official’s competence in fulfilling his duties)." Sinologist Tao Jiang (2021) does not argue Shang Yang has a xingming doctrine i.e. identical to Shen Buhai and Han Fei's doctrine rectifying names.

Chapter 6 of the Book of Lord Shang advocated "elevating the meritorious" based on examining performance in office, saying that the superior man will rectify "everything". Tao Jiang argues that Shang Yang established a "sophisticated and efficient bureaucracy", defining "an official’s role in terms of his position alone", and evaluating his performance on that basis.

When the superior man holds authority, he establishes techniques of rule by rectifying [everything]; he establishes offices and makes rank esteemed so as to correspond [to office]; he investigates one’s labor, elevates the meritorious, and then makes the appointments. Then superior and inferior are balanced. When superior and inferior are balanced, then ministers are able to fully commit their strength, and the sovereign is able to monopolize the handles of authority. (Lord Shang 6.11)

The Han Feizi chapter 43 criticizes an initial military promotion to office based on rank corresponding to enemy heads cut off. Criticizing Shang Yang as lacking in technique, it recalls Shen Buhai, defining technique as "bestowing office on the basis of concrete responsibilities, demanding performance on the basis of titles, wielding the levers of life and death, and examining the capacities of the ministers." Arguably, the chapter at least understates Shang Yang.

== Overview ==
Pines considered the Shangjunshu probably the earliest text taking the ruler's position (not simply the ruler himself) as pivotal for the state's well-being. However, the text is largely focused on the relation between the state and society, not 'monarchical power'.

The Book of Lord Shang teaches that "The law is an expression of love for the people... The sage, if he is able to strengthen the state thereby, does not model himself on antiquity, and if he is able to benefit the people thereby, does not adhere to the established rites." As such, the philosophy espoused is quite explicitly anti-Confucian:

Sophistry and cleverness are an aid to lawlessness; rites and music are symptoms of dissipations and licence; kindness and benevolence are the foster‑mother of transgressions; employment and promotion are opportunities for the rapacity of the wicked. If lawlessness is aided, it becomes current; if there are symptoms of dissipation and licence, they will become the practice; if there is a foster‑mother for transgressions, they will arise; if there are opportunities for the rapacity of the wicked, they will never cease. If these eight things come together, the people will be stronger than the government; but if these eight things are non‑existent in a state, the government will be stronger than the people. If the people are stronger than the government, the state is weak; if the government is stronger than the people, the army is strong. For if these eight things exist, the ruler has no one to use for defence and war, with the result that the state will be dismembered and will come to ruin; but if there are not these eight things, the ruler has the wherewithal for defence and war, with the result that the state will flourish and attain supremacy.

— Chapter 2, Paragraph 5 of The Book of Lord Shang, pg 109 of J.J.-L. Duyvendak, 1928

== Translations ==
- Duyvendak, J. J. L. (1928). The Book of Lord Shang. London: Arthur Probsthain; reprinted (1963), Chicago: University of Chicago Press.
- (in Japanese) Shimizu, Kiyoshi 清水潔 (1970). Shōshi 商子 [Shangzi]. Tokyo: Meitoku shuppansha.
- (in French) Levi, Jean (1981). Le Livre du prince Shang [The Book of Prince Shang]. Paris: Flammarion.
- Pines, Yuri (2017). The Book of Lord Shang - Apologetics of State Power in Early China (Translations from the Asian Classics). New York: Columbia University Press.
- (in German) Vogelsang, Kai (2017) Shangjun shu – Schriften des Fürsten von Shang. Stuttgart, Alfred Kröner Verlag, ISBN 978-3-520-16801-6

== See also ==
- Zhu Shizhe
