= Léon Vandermeersch =

French sinologist (1928–2021)

- Born: 7 January 1928; Wervicq-Sud, France
- Died: 17 October 2021 (aged 93); Paris, France
- Occupation: Sinologist

Léon Vandermeersch (7 January 1928 – 17 October 2021) was a French sinologist. He studied the culture of China as well as that of Japan and Korea.

== Biography ==
Vandermeersch studied Chinese and Vietnamese at the Institut national des langues et civilisations orientales. He graduated from the Faculté des lettres de Paris in 1951 with a law degree. He began his career in Vietnam as a secondary school teacher and was subsequently curator of the Musée Louis Finot from 1951 to 1958. He then moved to Japan and Hong Kong, where he continued his research on ancient China.

Vandermeersch earned a degree from the École pratique des hautes études in 1962 and earned a doctorate from Paris Diderot University in 1975 with a thesis on the institutions of archaic China. From 1966 to 1973, he taught Chinese at the University of Provence before directing East Asian studies at Paris Diderot University from 1973 to 1979. Until his retirement in 1993, he taught history of Confucianism at the École pratique des hautes études. He headed the Maison franco-japonaise from 1981 to 1984 and was Director of the French School of the Far East from 1989 to 1993.

Léon Vandermeersch died in Paris on 17 October 2021 at the age of 93.

== Notes ==
Early Chinese Texts (1993) still considered Leon's early work, La Formation du Légisme, notable for a reviewing of the Han Feizi's political ideas and concept of knowledge.

== Works ==
=== Books ===
- La formation du légisme (1965) (republished 1987)
- Le nouveau monde sinisé (1986)
- Confucianisme et sociétés asiatiques (1991)
- Études sinologiques (1994)
- Sagesses chinoises (1997)
- Les deux raisons de la pensée chinoise : divination et idéographie (2013)
- Ce que la Chine nous apprend : sur le langage, la société, l’existence (2019)

=== Articles ===
- "Une tradition réfractaire à la théologie : la tradition confucianiste" (1985)
- "Les origines divinatoires de la tradition chinoise du parallélisme littéraire" (1989)

== Decorations ==
- Knight of the Legion of Honour (1998)
- Officer of the Ordre des Palmes académiques
