= Rectification of names =

Confucian political concept

- Chinese: 正名
- Literal meaning: Rectify names
Transcriptions
Standard Mandarin
- Hanyu Pinyin: zhèngmíng
- Bopomofo: ㄓㄥˋ ㄇㄧㄥˊ
- Wade–Giles: cheng^{4} ming^{2}
Wu
- Romanization: tsen^{5} min^{6}
Yue: Cantonese
- Jyutping: zing^{3} ming^{4}
Middle Chinese
- Middle Chinese: tsyengH mjieng
Old Chinese
- Baxter–Sagart (2014): /*teŋ-s C.meŋ/
- Zhengzhang: /*tjeŋs meŋ/

The rectification of names (Chinese: 正名; pinyin: Zhèngmíng; Wade–Giles: Cheng-ming) is originally a doctrine of feudal Confucian designations and relationships, behaving accordingly to ensure social harmony. Without such accordance "undertakings would not be completed" and societal order would fail. Mencius extended the doctrine to include questions of political legitimacy.

When Confucius was asked what he would do if he was a governor, he said he would "rectify the names" to make words correspond to reality.

== Confucius ==
The Analects states that social disorder often stems from failure to call things by their proper names. Confucius' solution to this was the "rectification of names". He gave an explanation to one of his disciples:

A superior man, in regard to what he does not know, shows a cautious reserve. If names be not correct, language is not in accordance with the truth of things. If language be not in accordance with the truth of things, affairs cannot be carried on to success. When affairs cannot be carried on to success, proprieties and music do not flourish. When proprieties and music do not flourish, punishments will not be properly awarded. When punishments are not properly awarded, the people do not know how to move hand or foot. Therefore a superior man considers it necessary that the names he uses may be spoken appropriately, and also that what he speaks may be carried out appropriately. What the superior man requires is just that in his words there may be nothing incorrect.

— Confucius, Analects, Book XIII, Chapter 3, verses 4–7, Analect 13.3, translated by James Legge

The teaching of Confucius consists of five basic relationships in life:

- Ruler to subject
- Parent to child
- Husband to wife
- Elder brother to younger brother
- Friend to friend

In the above relationships, Confucius teaches that righteous, considerate, kind, benevolent, and gentle treatment should be applied by the former to the latter. And that with the application of such practices in day-to-day life, societal problems would be solved and righteous government would be achieved. The carrying out of these relational duties would equate the proper channeling of li and the correct use of zhèngmíng congruent to Confucius' teachings leading to the envisioned path of his doctrine; a moral and efficient society and individuals who have achieved the ascension to superior human beings through the principles of li and ren. The proper operation of oneself ultimately depends on the role of zhèngmíng; essentially a circle of dependency in terms of the practice and application of principles and ways.

In Confucianism, the Rectification of Names means that "things in actual fact should be made to accord with the implications attached to them by names, the prerequisites for correct living and even efficient government being that all classes of society should accord to what they ought to be". Without the rectification of names, different words would have different actions. This essentially means for every action, there is a word that describes that action. The belief is that by following the Rectification of Names, one would be following the correct/right path. The rectification of names also calls for a standard language in which ancient rulers could impose laws that everyone could understand to avoid confusion.

Each person has a social standing and a social name. With their social names comes responsibilities and duties. Ruler, minister, father and son all have social names therefore need to fulfill their required social duties of respect (The rectification of names). For example, in the study of Chinese culture a child only speaks when a parent permits them to speak.

Following orders from a person of authority means that one is showing respect, therefore that one is following the Rectification of Names without explicitly acknowledging it. Confucius' belief in the Rectification of Names is still practiced in today's society, for example when a teacher asks a student to address a visitor, that student will follow the instructions.

== Mohism and Legalism ==
Because the rectification of names in the Analects of Confucius appears to have been written later, the rectification of names has been argued in western sinology to have earlier have originated in Mozi (470–391 BC). Noting that the term Chengming or rectification of names only appears once in the Analects, and not at all in Mencius, sinologist Herrlee G. Creel earlier argued it's origination in Shen Buhai (400–337 BC) for the same reasons, as intentionally imaginative theory increasing Shen Buhai's role in history.

However, as Creel himself argued, Shen Buhai has Confucian elements and is largely administrative. The idea of the rectification of names, is, at least, consonant throughout the Analects. The earlier sinologists were more focused on terms, though Shen Buhai's rectification is relevant for the Han Feizi. More modernly, professor Zhenbin Sun considers Mozi's rectification itself consonant with Confucian usages, Mozi moreover considering it an important factor in the resolution of sociopolitical issues, and not simply administration.

The Mohist and "Legalistic" version of the rectification of names emphasizes the use of hermeneutics to find "objective models" (法; fa) for ethics and politics, as well as in practical fields of work, to order or govern society. Mozi advocated language standards appropriate for use by ordinary people. With minimal training, anyone could use these "objective, particularly operational or measurement-like standards", giving identical names to equivalent social relationships and functions so as to apply identical standards of "correct" behavior in analogous situations.

By contrast, the Zhuangzi says that "great words are overflowing; small words haggling"(2.2), the true self lacks form (2.3), the mind can spontaneously select (2.4), asks whether language is different from the chirping of birds (2.5), and rejects assertion and denial (2.7), saying "to wear out one's spirit like powers contriving some view... without understanding that it is all the same is called 'three in the morning'".

== School of Names ==
The School of Names (名家; Míngjiā), which is closely connected with Mohism, paid considerable attention to the rectification of names, chiefly with respect to the relationship between names (名), forms (形), and reality (實). Johnston states that it began with Deng Xi, who introduced the term zhengming (正名) that would be played upon by Confucius. This then led to Laozi's denunciation in the Daodejing as Hui Shi began researching paradoxes of language. Thereafter, Yin Wen taught Gongsun Long, and the two would produce works on the subject of names and reality, with Confucius's quote as the foundation for that research.

According to the Yin Wenzi, there are three categories of names:

1. Names for things (物之名), corresponding to nouns.
2. Names for praise and blame (毀譽之名), corresponding to verbs and adjectives, similar to the praise and blame seen in Spring and Autumn Annals discourse.
3. Names for "things in general" (況謂之名).

Gongsun Long paid attention to a particular quote by Confucius, though said quote is not found in any Confucian texts. In the book of Gongsun Long, there is this story. In the story, the King of Chu went hunting and lost his bow. His followers were going to search for it, but he stopped them:

王曰：‘止也，楚人遺弓，楚人得之，又何求乎？
The King said: “Stop. A Chu person lost it, and a Chu person will find it. Why search for it?”

仲尼聞之曰：‘楚王仁義而未遂，亦曰人得之而已矣，何必楚乎？’ (Note: In 公孫龍子·迹府, the 乎 is absent)
Zhongni (Confucius) heard of it, and said: "King of Chu, though benevolent and righteous, failed to achieve his goal, saying that others had already obtained it; why must it be [a] Chu [person]?"

Specifically, Gongsun Long believed that the elision of ren (人; "person") in the second quote was abnormal and warranted attention. Despite the omission of "person," the King of Chu understood the quote. In practice, Gongsun Long had, then, identified linguistic deixis, displaying the logic like so:

Chu person 楚人 = [Entity that is of Chu] ∩ [Entity that is a Person]

This jianming (兼名) as it is called, could, then, be an identification of intersective adjectives as seen in modern semantics. Gongsun Long had believed that this understanding of names and reality would assist a junzi with aligning their use of names and correct language. In a debate with Kong Chuan known as the White Horse Dialogue, he defended and elaborated upon his theory, but was advised by Lord Pingyuan to desist in the debates.

== Guan Zhong ==
For Guan Zhong as for the Mohists, Fa provided a system of objective, reliable, publicly accessible standards or models that individuals could use for themselves to decide their own actions, in contrast to what Sinologist Chad Hansen terms the "cultivated intuition of self-admiration societies" whereby scholars steeped in old texts maintained a monopoly on moral decision-making. At the same time, Fa could also complement traditional schemes, and Guan Zhong himself uses it alongside the Confucian concept of ceremony (禮; Li). For the most part, Confucianism does not emphasize Fa, though the concept of norms that people can apply themselves is an older idea, and Han Confucians embraced Fa as an essential element of administration.

== Shen Buhai ==
Evolving out of the usages of the Confucians, Mohists and school of names, reformer Shen Buhai insisted that the ruler must be fully informed on the state of his realm, using Fa as administrative method to sort out informational categories or define functions ("names"). Shen Buhai and later Han Fei (280–233 BC) used this variation on the rectification of names for appointment, matching the words or "names" of the official with his performance. Han Fei bases his propositions for lingual uniformity upon the development of this system, proposing that functions could be strictly defined to prevent conflict and corruption, and objective rules (Fa) impervious to divergent interpretation could be established, judged solely by their effectiveness.

== Xunzi ==
Xun Zi wrote a chapter on "The Rectification of Names" developing a theme that had been introduced by Confucius saying: "Let the ruler be ruler, the subject subject; let the father be father, and the son son." Chapter 22, "on the Rectification of Names", claims the ancient sage kings chose names (名; míng) that directly corresponded with actualities (實; shí), but later generations confused terminology, coined new nomenclature, and thus could no longer distinguish right from wrong.

Xun Zi not only wrote that chapter on the topic of the rectification of names but went as far as to develop/expand the rectification into a system of logic. Xun Zi, who believed that man's inborn tendencies need to be curbed through education and ritual, countered to Mencius's view that man is innately good. He believed that ethical norms had been invented to rectify mankind. Other philosophers and logicians such as Guanzi, Mozi, and Gongsun Long developed their own theories regarding the rectification. Li in itself can be seen as the root of all this propriety and social etiquette discussed in the rectification of names as the cure to society's problems and the solution to a moral and efficient government and society.

== Modern applications ==
The concept of rectification of names is one of the most basic mottoes of Chinese philosophy. It has been applied to a broad range of issues and mainly resides in the field of politics. This basic yet powerful precept has served as a means for the toppling and reforming of dynasties. In today's society, the rectification of names is being used popularly with government decisions.

Backed by strong public demands, Taiwan during Democratic Progressive Party administrations puts effort into reviewing the names of state-owned enterprises and government entities to preserve their unique identity from Chinese influence. For those who still practice the traditional Confucian approach to ethics and social morality, the rectification of names has an impact in the way society is structured. According to Xuezhi Guo, "Rectification of names also implies the promotion and development of an elaborately differentiated system of status based on social obligations".

== See also ==
- Hypocognition
- Kong Chuan
- Linguistic prescriptivism
- Linguistic relativity
- True name
- White Horse Dialogue
- Yin Wen
- Yumin zhengce
