= Kong Chuan =

Sixth-generation descendent of Confucius

Kong Chuan 孔穿
- Born: c. 3rd century B.C. State of Lu
- Died: ? (Age 51)
- Resting place: Cemetery of Confucius, Lu
- Occupation: Philosopher
- Known for: Debate with Gongsun Long
- Children: Kong Qian (孔谦)
- Father: Kong Ji (孔箕)

Philosophical work
- School: Confucianism
- Main interests: Rectification of Names

Kong Chuan

Personal name
- Chinese: 孔穿
Transcriptions
Standard Mandarin
- Hanyu Pinyin: kǒng chuān
- Bopomofo: ㄎㄨㄥˇ ㄔㄨㄢ
- Wade–Giles: kʻung^{3} chʻuan^{1}
Wu
- Romanization: khon^{5} tshoe^{1}
Yue: Cantonese
- Yale Romanization: hung^{2} cyun^{1}
Middle Chinese
- Middle Chinese: khuwngX tsyhwen
Old Chinese
- Baxter–Sagart (2014): /*[k]ʰˤoŋʔ tʰo[n]/
- Zhengzhang: /*kʰloːŋʔ kʰljon/

Courtesy name
- Chinese: 子高
Transcriptions
Standard Mandarin
- Hanyu Pinyin: zǐ gāo
- Bopomofo: ㄗˇ ㄍㄠ
- Wade–Giles: tzŭ^{3} kao^{1}
Wu
- Romanization: tsy^{5} kau^{1}
Yue: Cantonese
- Yale Romanization: zi^{2} gou^{1}
Middle Chinese
- Middle Chinese: tsiX kaw
Old Chinese
- Baxter–Sagart (2014): /*[ts]əʔ Cə.[k]ˤaw/
- Zhengzhang: /*ʔslɯʔ kaːw/

Kong Chuan (孔穿), courtesy name Zi Gao (子高), was a sixth-generation descendent of the philosopher Confucius, native to the State of Lu. He is primarily known for his debates with Gongsun Long on his White Horse Dialogue. He defined Confucianism as "embracing excellence and the Six Arts; (Note: liù yì 六藝: Archery, chariot-riding, calligraphy, music, adherence to social propriety li 禮, calligraphy, and mathematics.) the balance between movement and stillness should not be lost."

== Life ==
Kong Chuan was the great-great-grandson of Kong Ji, and the sixth-generation descendent of Confucius. He bore one son, Kong Qian, who would go on to have three sons; Kong Fu (孔鲋), Kong Teng (孔腾), and Kong Shu (孔树). Kong Fu would author the Kong Family Master's Anthology (孔叢子), which recorded many of Kong Chuan's activities. He was offered to work in the State of Zhao and State of Chu, but declined both offers.

== Career ==
=== White Horse Dialogue ===
Kong Chuan's debates with Gongsun Long are described in the Kong Family Master's Anthology and Gongsunlongzi. The latter's account cuts off after Kong Chuan first leaves, whereas the former documents the debate seemingly in full. Due to the conflict in accounts, what truly occurred during the debate is unclear.

In the Kong Family Master's Anthology, Kong Chuan was asked by an unnamed person to correct Gongsun Long, believing he was bringing shame and humiliation to the Dao; therefore, correcting him was a matter of restoring balance. The two met at the residence of Lord Pingyuan, where Kong introduced himself as having wanted to study under Gongsun, but could not due to his disagreement with the White Horse Dialogue. Gongsun rebuked Kong for this, believing his ideas to be based on his logical proofs coming from the White Horse Dialogue; therefore, he would have nothing to teach, and compared the situation where King Xuan of Qi asked a similar question to Yin Wen. He then clarified his position, discussing a quote from Confucius:

王曰：‘止也，楚人遺弓，楚人得之，又何求乎？
The King said: “Wait. A man of Chu lost it, so a Chu person will find it. Why search for it?”

仲尼聞之曰：‘楚王仁義而未遂，亦曰人得之而已矣，何必楚乎？’ (Note: In 公孫龍子·迹府, the 乎 is absent)
Zhongni (Confucius) asked King Gong of Chu, saying: "The King of Chu, though benevolent and righteous, failed to achieve his goal, saying that others had already obtained it; why must it be [a] Chu [person]?"

Gongsun Long had noticed that Confucius omitted ren 人 in this quote, yet the message of a "man of Chu" got across fine; he used deixis to make a synecdoche out of chu 楚. The logic can be displayed like so:

Chu person 楚人 = [Entity that is of Chu] ∩ [Entity that is a Person]

Gongsun Long had, then, potentially identified intersective modifiers (兼名) as used in modern semantics, and was building logic off it to advance the theory of rectification of names. He concluded, saying that to want to learn, but not learn the most important part of his theory, would make even a hundred of himself insufficient to teach Kong Chuan. Kong then moved to leave, stating: “Words that are wrong yet cleverly disguised, clever yet unreasonable—this is something that can be answered without exception.” Lord Pingyuan rebuked him for this, as not only were the wrongs unresolved, but also that Kong Chuan had not spent time with him. Attempting to resolve the contradictions, he picked Kong Chuan's mind, asking for an explanation. Kong Chuan responded with a quote from the Spring and Autumn Annals: (Note: Specifically, the 18th year of the Duke Xi of Lu's reign.)

六鷁退飛
Six herons fly back

Kong Chuan argued thusly: Upon seeing the herons, there are six. Upon closer inspection, there is one. The hawk is like a horse; the six is like the colour white. Colour, then, distinguishes the "inner" from the "outer". Kong Chuan's argument relies on a distinction between modifiers and head nouns, which modern semantics identifies as intersective adjective + noun compounds. He then cites either Gaoyang or Ganmao from the Classic of Poetry: If silk and hemp are added to a woman's work, one can find either a plain green or a plain yellow colour. Although the colours are different, their qualities are the same; therefore, those poems would say "plain silk" 素絲, not "silk-plain" 絲素. He furthermore cites the Book of Rites, specifically Za Ji I, which would say fine-cloth 緇布, not cloth-fine 布緇. Therefore, Kong had argued that, in classical usage, Old Chinese is adjective-initial, that the descriptor must precede the name. Therefore, these were not necessarily inseparable compounds, but a grammatical construction. He concluded that a Junzi would value the principle of things rather than flowery, excessive explanations 貴繁辭 for such a thing. He then argued that Confucius was critiquing the reductionist nature of King Gong of Chu's statement; why must it be Chu?

Eventually, the debate arrived at Gongsun Long citing the structure Zang San'er 臧三耳, to which Kong Chuan could not answer. He left, but came to a higher understanding and returned. However, Lord Pingyuan advised Gongsun Long to not continue debating Kong Chuan, believing his arguments to be more based on rhetoric and sophistry than reason, and that Kong Chuan's reasoning would win in the end.

=== Meeting with Lord Pingyuan ===
During his time at Lord Pingyuan's residence, Kong Chuan was asked about the legend of Confucius meeting with Lady Nanzi, a consort of Duke Ling of Wei, a common accusation that alleges he sought favour through improper channels and was susceptible to feminine charm. Kong argued viciously against the rumour, claiming that as Confucius would not stay with Duke Ling to discuss military affairs - even harnessing his horse and trotting away when pressed - he had no reason to stay for the duke's wife, and to accept Lady Nanzi's advances would be to violate li. Therefore, any meeting would have been ceremonial. Lord Pingyuan then brings up A'gu (阿穀), another story of Confucius speaking improperly with A'gu, a laundry lady, to which Kong Chuan says it is a "story brought up in recent times by those wishing to act out their own fantasies."

=== Counsel with King Anxi of Wei ===
In a meeting with King Anxi of Wei and Lord Xinling (信陵君), Kong Chuan defines an effective minister thusly;

大臣則必取眾人之選，能犯顏諫爭，公正無私者。計陳事成，主裁其賞；事敗，臣執其咎。主任之而無疑，臣當之而弗避。君總其美，臣行其義。然則君不猜於臣，臣不隱於君，故動無過計，舉無敗事，是以臣主並各有得也。
An effective minister must be picked from the crowd: They must be able to brave the ruler’s countenance to remonstration, they must be just and selfless. They sets forth their plans; if their affairs succeed, the ruler dispenses a reward; if their affairs fail, the minister takes the blame. The ruler should employ them without suspicion; the minister must weather the storm. The ruler gets the credit; the minister fulfils their duty. Therefore, the ruler does not distrust their minister, nor does the minister conceal anything from the ruler. Thus, in action there is no conspiracy or erroneous plan, in undertaking no failed enterprise; therefore, both ruler and minister get what is right.

=== Counsel with King Jian of Qi ===
Kong Chuan opposed the brutal death penalty by pulling chariots enforced by King Jian of Qi against lawbreakers. During counsel, he argued that the people, who intrinsically have the five constant virtues, will rebel against him for it, and his attempts to rule by fear will cause scholars to avoid his state. This argument led to its abolition in the State of Qi. In a separate meeting, he educated King Jian on the power of garnering respect through virtue rather than appearance, leading to the appointment of a man named Guan Mu (管穆) to Minister of Linzi (臨淄).
