= Legal (disambiguation) =

Legal matters relate to the system of law governing a society.

Legal also may refer to:

== Law ==
- Principle of legality (disambiguation)
- Legal education
- Legal awareness
- Legalism (disambiguation)

== Arts and entertainment ==
- Legal (Gal Costa album) (1970)
- Legal (Special Ed album) (1990)
- "Legal" (song), by Snow
- "Legal" (CSI episode), in CSI:Miami television series

== Other uses ==
- Legal (constituency), functional constituency in Hong Kong
- Legal, a cannabis-infused beverage sold by Mirth Provisions
- Legal, Alberta, Canada
- Légal Trap, a chess opening trap
- Legal size, a paper size
