= Deng Xi =

Chinese philosopher and rhetorician (c.545–501 BCE)

Deng Xi (/ˈdʌŋ ˈʃiː/; Chinese: 鄧析; Wade–Giles: Têng Hsi, c. 545 – 501 BCE) was a Chinese philosopher and rhetorician associated with the School of Names. Once a senior official of the Zheng state (now Xinzheng, Zhengzhou in Henan province), and a contemporary of Confucius, he is regarded as China's earliest recorded lawyer, known for his clever use of words and language in lawsuits. In fact, Deng was the first trial lawyer in the world to give services as a profession, centuries before Emperor Claudius in western Rome. The Zuo Zhuan and Annals of Lü Buwei critically credit Deng with the authorship of a penal code, the earliest known statute in Chinese criminology entitled the "Bamboo Law." This was developed to take the place of the harsh, more Confucian criminal code developed by the Zheng statesman Zichan.

Deng is regarded as the first proponent to advocate following the li, or pattern of things. A term which refers to the processing of jade, it would be utilised by the neo-Mohists as the term identifying the logic and history of a thing in the growth of a proposition. With arguments pertaining to forms and names, Deng Xi is cited by Liu Xiang for the origin of the principle of xingming, referring to a matching of ministerial words and results. Similarly utilised by Shen Buhai and Han Fei, this would likely make him an important contributor to both Chinese philosophy and the foundations of Chinese statecraft.

Associated with litigation, he is said to have argued for the permissibility of contradictory propositions, engaging in hair-splitting debates on the interpretation of laws, legal principles and definitions. However, the purpose of his concept of bian is specifically to examine and distinguish categories so as to prevent hindrances or disturbances, with inferences are then made categorically. He distinguishes great and small bian ethically rather than logically, as Xun Kuang would later (although the Mohists also had ethical discussions). Under the influence of the Mohists, Xun Kuang would suggest categorization as a key to understanding.

== Deng Xi Zi ==
The Han History (Hanshu) attributes two scrolls of writings to Deng Xi, neither of which survives, though Professor Zhenbin Sun at least considers the text bearing Deng's name to reflect his thought. It recommends that a wise king "follow names and observe actualities, examine laws and establish authority", saying that "positions cannot be surpassed, official titles cannot be used, and officials have their own responsibilities according to their names and titles. The superior follows the names and inspects if they correspond to actuality, the subordinate carries the orders and puts them into practice." Along more logical lines comparable to Mozi it advocates "distinguishing different categories so that they may not hinder each other, and to organise different bases so that they may not disturb each other."

== Biography ==
Developing his debating skills in the legal courts of the state of Zheng, Deng served as a minor official there. Depicted as taking both sides of his cases, he is said to have argued for the permissibility of contradictory propositions, likely engaging in hair-splitting debates on the interpretation of laws, legal principles and definitions. The Annals of Lu Buwei introduce him as a man who could "argue a right to be wrong and a wrong to be right, [for whom] right and wrong had no fixed standard, and 'yea' and nay' changed every day.... What he wished to win always won, and whom he desired to punish was always punished."

Deng attracted many clients seeking legal advice, and apparently charging for cases in articles of clothing, he would eventually have enough to count himself rich. With Xunzi's book pairing him with Hui Shi, it is difficult to separate their contributions. An example of his sophistry:

The Wei River was extremely high. A person from the house of a rich man of Zheng drowned. Someone found the body. The rich man asked to buy it back. The man demanded very much money. The rich man told Deng Xi about it. Deng Xi said, “Calm down. There's certainly no one else he can sell the body to.” The man who found the body was troubled by this and told Deng Xi about it. Deng Xi replied to him by saying, “Calm down. There's certainly nowhere else they can buy the body.”

Despite this portrayal, more modern scholars consider that, having taken the time to write his own penal code, Deng may have been a well-intentioned legal reformer opposing what he saw as the suppression of ideas and opinions. Nit-picking over aspects of the law to defy Zichan's attempts to stop the publication of posters, Professors Xing Lu and Zhenbin Sun consider Deng wanted to challenge Confucian Li in favour of litigation and a free exchange, favouring what is termed "big" or communal arguments over petty ones as better resolving issues.

== Legacy ==
Deng Xi was executed in 501 BC, by Si Chuan, the ruler of the state of Zheng. Si Chuan then adopted his penal code.

The Xunzi paired him with Hui Shi as part of a general intellectual tradition, though the two lived 200 years apart. Xunzi's primary complaint about the two was that they didn't conform to ritual and "righteousness", or the "facts about right and wrong", portraying him as a talented person who, neglecting the way of Confucian morality, wasted his time on pointless intellectual games and sophistry. The Han Feizi tends to dismiss the Logicians as useless, despite deriving a part of its statecraft from them and also both figures being considered early Legalists.

Deng Xi Park is a park in Xinzheng in Zhengzhou which is the modern city where the state of Zheng is now located.
