= Mirth =

Mirth may refer to:

- Gladness and gaiety, especially when expressed by laughter
- Mirth Connect, software for conversion between health record standards
- Mirth Provisions, a cannabis company based in Longview, Washington
- USS Mirth (AM-265), a World War II Admirable-class minesweeper used by the U.S. Navy 1943–1945
