= School of Names =

Ancient Chinese philosophical school

- Chinese: 名家
Transcriptions
Standard Mandarin
- Hanyu Pinyin: Míngjiā
- Bopomofo: ㄇㄧㄥˊ ㄐㄧㄚ
- Wade–Giles: Ming^{2}-chia^{1}
Yue: Cantonese
- Jyutping: Ming4 gaa1

Alternative Chinese name
- Chinese: 形名家
- Literal meaning: School of forms and names
Transcriptions
Standard Mandarin
- Hanyu Pinyin: Xíngmíngjiā
- Bopomofo: ㄒㄧㄥˊ ㄇㄧㄥˊ ㄐㄧㄚ
- Wade–Giles: Hsing^{2}-ming^{2}-chia^{1}
Yue: Cantonese
- Jyutping: Jing4 ming4 gaa1

The School of Names (Míngjiā), or School of Forms and Names (Xíngmíngjiā), represents a school of thought in Chinese philosophy that grew out of Mohist logic. Sometimes termed Logicians, "dialecticians" or sophists modernly, Han scholars used it in reference to figures earlier termed Debaters (bian ze) or Disputers in the Zhuangzi, as a view seemingly dating back to the Warring States period (c. 479 – 221 BC). Jin Zhuo shortened the name to Mingjia when he mistranslated Xing (forms) as punishment, probably via the Xunzi and Han Feizi's Xingming, assuming Xing to refer to the Legalists.

Their school is sometimes treated together with the Later Mohists. Rather than a unified movement like the Mohists, they represent a social category of early linguistic debaters. Critical arguments in late Mohist texts, with their own logicians, would appear directed at their kind of debates, but likely respected them. Figures associated with it include Deng Xi, Yin Wen, Hui Shi, and Gongsun Long. A Three Kingdoms era figure, Xu Gan, is relevant for discussions of names and realities, but was more Confucian and less philosophically relativist.

Including figures referenced by the Zhuangzi, some likely served as a bridge between Mohism and the relativism of Zhuangzi Daoism, which, in contrast to the Daodejing, "clearly reveals exposure" to school of names thinkers. Contrary Mohism as including linguistics seeking objective standards, Hui Shi is noted for relativism, but also "embracing the ten thousand things" (his tenth thesis). In the Mawangdui Silk Texts, the idea of universal love follows from Mozi and Laozi type ideas, transitioning towards Laozi.

But Hui Shi may not have had much connection with Gongsun Long. Their backgrounds would have ranged from Mohist and Confucian to Daoistic. Gongsun Long is familiar with both Confucianism and Mohism. Though (other) Confucians may have been critical, arguably he attempts to support Confucian conservatism against relativism, citing Confucius in defense of the White Horse Dialogue as an "objective" (and conservative) use of linguistics. More in line with Confucianism and Mohism, he believed in kindness and duty, and has a rectification of names doctrine aimed at actualities and social order rather than relativism. Willing to argue either side of an issue, they were taken as sophist by their critics, but some arguments were not necessarily intended to be paradoxical.

A contemporary of Confucius and the younger Mozi, Deng Xi, associated with litigation, is taken by Liu Xiang as the originator of the principle of xíngmíng, or ensuring that ministers' deeds (xing) harmonized with their words (ming). A primary concern of the bureaucratically oriented Shen Buhai and Han Fei, some of their administrators would have had a concern for relations in the bureaucracy. Another relativist figure in the Zhuangzi, Xun Kuang considered Shen Dao something of a disputer himself, but one "obsessed" with fa (concept) rather than names and realities. With Gongsun Long as example, most were still likely more socially and philosophically oriented than the late, stringent Han Feizi; it cannot be assumed that many were familiar with Shang Yang.

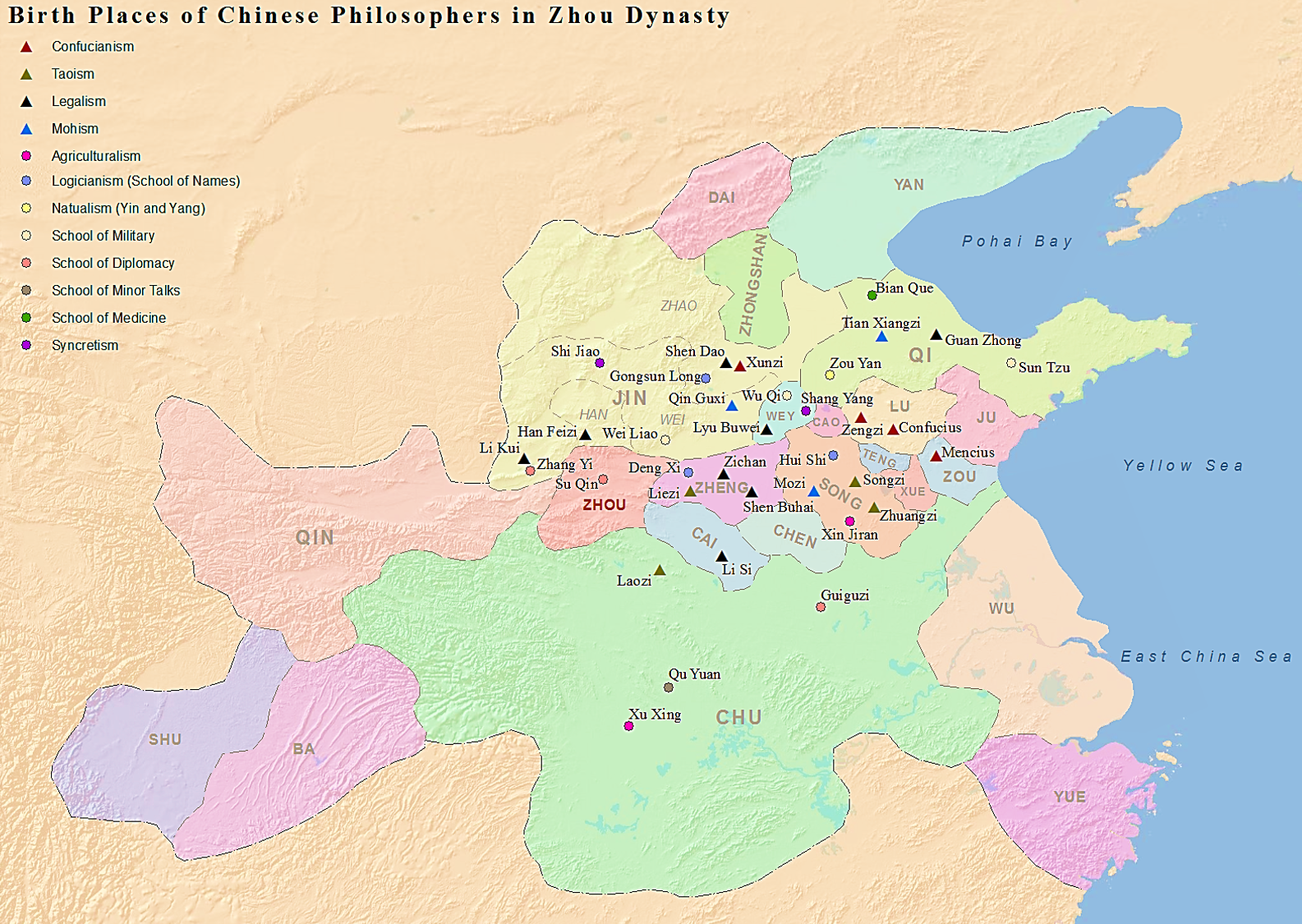
Birthplaces of notable Zhou-era philosophers belonging to the School of Names are marked by circles in blue.

== Overview ==
The earliest literary occurrence for xingming is in the Zhan Guo Ce, in reference to what would become known as the School of Names amongst other more modern terms; Chris Fraser (Stanford Encyclopedia) modernly argues "Disputers" a more "appropriate" English label.

The philosophy of the Logicians is often considered to be akin to those of the sophists or of the dialecticians. One of the few surviving lines from the school, "a one-foot stick, every day take away half of it, in a myriad ages it will not be exhausted", resembles Zeno's paradoxes. However, some of their other aphorisms seem contradictory or unclear when taken out of context, for example, "dogs are not hounds". Joseph Needham notes that their works have been lost, except for the partially preserved oeuvre of Gongsun Long, and the paradoxes of Chapter 33 of the Zhuangzi, considering the disappearance of the greater part of Gongsun Long's work one of the worst losses in the ancient Chinese books, as what remains is said to reach the highest point of ancient Chinese philosophical writing.

As with the Legalists, Sinologist Kidder Smith highlights the mixed posthumous reception received by the school of names. Already opposed by the Later Mohists (who have also sometimes been termed "logicians") in their own era for their paradoxes, many of them, despite being remembered as sophists, would also have been administrators. Hui Shi was a prime minister, while Gongsun Long was a diplomat and peace activist, as typical of the Mohists. Although not classed under it, while Shen Buhai may not have been familiar with his contemporary Shang Yang in the remote Qin state, he likely was familiar with central Chinese "school of names" type debates on language and the correlation between the names and realities of things, with language useful in administration.

== Shen Buhai ==
In the Han dynasty secretaries of government who had charge of the records of decisions in criminal matters would come to be called xingming. The Han-era scholars Sima Qian (c. 145 – c. 86 BC) and Liu Xiang (77–6 BC) attribute the doctrine of Xing-Ming back to Shen Buhai (400 – c. 337 BC). According to the Han Feizi, Shen Buhai actually used the older, more philosophically common equivalent, ming-shi, or name and reality, linking the origination of their administrative method, or "doctrine of names", with the debates of the neo-Mohists and school of names. Such discussions are prominent in the Han Feizi.

Ming ('name') sometimes has the sense of "speech", so as to compare the statements of an aspiring officer with the reality of his actions—or of "reputation", again compared with real conduct (xing 'form' or shi 'reality'). Two anecdotes in the Han Feizi provide examples—member of the School of Names Ni Yue argued that a white horse is not a horse, and defeated all debaters, but was still tolled at the gate. In another, the chief minister of Yan pretended to see a white horse dash out the gate. All of his subordinates denied having seen anything, save one, who ran out after it and returned claiming to have seen it, and was thereby identified as a flatterer.

Shen Buhai's personnel control, or rectification of names, with "names" representing ministerial claims, thereby worked for "strict performance control", correlating claims, performances and posts. It would become a central tenet of both the Han Feizi's statecraft and other so-called 'Huang–Lao' derivatives. Rather than having to look for "good" men, mingshi or xingming can seek the right man for a particular post, though doing so implies a total organizational knowledge of the regime. More simply though, it can allow ministers to "name" themselves through accounts of specific cost and time frame, leaving their definition to competing ministers. Claims or utterances "bind the speaker to the realization a job". This was the doctrine favoured by Han Fei, with subtle differences. Favoring exactness, the correct articulation of ming or terms is considered crucial to the realization of projects, combatting the tendency to promise too much.

== See also ==
- History of logic
- Nominalism
