= Legality (disambiguation) =

Legality is the state of being consistent with the law or of being lawful or unlawful in a given jurisdiction, and the construct of power.

Legality may also refer to:

- Principle of legality (disambiguation)
- Legality of anabolic steroids
- Legality of recording by civilians
- Legality of the Vietnam War
- Legality of cannabis by country
- Legality of drugs
  - Drug regulation
  - Drug legalization

== See also ==
- Legality Movement Party
