= Vladimir Spirin =

Russian philologist, sinologist and historian (1929–2002)

Vladimir Semionovich Spirin (Russian: Владимир Семёнович Спирин; 5 May 1929 – 17 May 2002) was a Russian philologist, sinologist, historian, primarily interested resided in classical Chinese philology and Chinese philosophy. Throughout his career he was a lecturer of Saint Petersburg State University, researcher at Saint Petersburg's branch of the Institute of Oriental Studies of the Russian Academy of Sciences, Saint Petersburg Russia, Candidate of Sciences (equiv. Ph.D.).

== Biography ==
Dr. Spirin graduated in 1952 from the East Asian Studies Department at the Saint Petersburg State University and started to work as a researcher at Saint Petersburg's (then Leningrad) branch of the Institute of Oriental Studies of the Russian Academy of Sciences, where he worked until his death. Since 1957, he had been a member of the research group that worked on description of Dunhuang manuscripts, preserved in Russia (other members were Dr. Lev Menshikov, S.A. Schcolyar, etc.) In the 1960s, during the time of the Cultural Revolution, he conducted studies in China for nine months. He defended his doctoral thesis (Candidate of Sciences, Philosophy) in 1970, under the title of "On Methodological Problems of Studying the Classic Chinese Philosophy: In Relation to the Analysis of Text Structures". Since 1977 and until 1990s, he taught the Classic Chinese Philosophy to philosophy students at the Saint Petersburg State University, as an invited lecturer.

His main area of research had been methodological problems of studying classic Chinese texts. He developed an original structural approach to the texts, and discovered various types of textological structures in the classic Chinese culture. His method of graphic description of textual structures, providing simplicity and easy visualization, according to some researchers, reminds graphic methods of logical description such as Lambert's lines or Eiler's circles, as well as the implementation of graphic description in thermodynamics by Clapeyron. Spirin's work strongly influenced the study of Chinese culture in Russia, especially the younger generation of sinologists, working in Moscow (based in Leningrad he was not in permanent direct contact with these researchers). For example, according to A. Kobzev, Spirin's structural semiotic approach was intensively used by A.Karapetiantz. Spirin also influenced such Russian researchers as A.Kobzev, A.Krushinsky, M.Isayeva, V.Dorofeeva-Lichtman, etc.

== Bibliography ==
=== Dissertation ===
- Некоторые методологические проблемы изучения древнекитайской философии. (В связи с анализом структуры текстов). Автореф.дисс. ... к.филос.н. М., 1970. ("On Methodological Problems of Studying the Classic Chinese Philosophy: In Relation to the Analysis of Text Structures", (The Summary of the Ph.D. Thesis), Moscow, 1970, in Russian.)

=== Books ===
- Построение древнекитайских текстов. М., Наука. 1976. 231 стр. 1700 экз. 2-е изд. (с послесловием Р. Н. Дёмина). СПб, 2006. 276 стр. ISBN 5-85803-323-7 ("Formation of Classic Chinese Texts", Moscow, Science Publishers, 1976 (first edition); Saint Petersburg, 2006 (second edition, with the Afterword by R. Diomin), in Russian.)
- Дэн Си Цзы как логико-гносеологическое произведение. Перевод и исследование. Спб.: Петербургское востоковедение, 2012. ISBN 5-85803-323-7 (""Deng Xi-zi" as a Logico-Gnoseological Work". St.Petersburg, Petersburg's Orientalists Publishers, 2012.)

=== Articles ===
- О «третьих» и «пятых» понятиях в логике древнего Китая. // Дальний Восток. М., 1961. ("On "Third" and "Fifth" Concepts in the Classic Chinese Logic", Far East, 1961, in Russian.)
- Об одной особенности древнекитайской философии. // Пятая научная конференция «Общество и государство в Китае». Ч.1. М., 1975. ("On One of Specifics of the Classic Chinese Philosophy", V Conference "Society and State in China", Moscow, 1975, Vol.1, in Russian.)
- К вопросу о «пяти элементах» в классической китайской философии. // Шестая научная конференция «Общество и государство в Китае». Ч.I. М., 1975. ("On the Issue of Five Elements in the Classic Chinese Philosophy", VI Conference "Society and State in China", Moscow, Vol.1, in Russian.)
- К предыстории понятия «График» (Дао)// Письменные памятники и проблемы истории культуры народов Востока М., 1975. Вып. IX. ("On Prehistory of the Concept of the Chart (Dao)", Literary Monuments and Problems of History of Asian Peoples, Moscow, vol. IX, in Russian.)
- Примеры сравнительно простого значения «дао» // Девятая научная конференция «Общество и государство в Китае». М.1976. Ч.I. ("Examples of Comparatively Simple Meaning of Dao", IX Conference "Society and State in China", Moscow, Vol.1, in Russian.)
- «Любовь» и математика в «Мо-цзы» // Письменные памятники и проблемы истории культуры народов Востока. X. М.,1974. (""Love" and Mathematics in Mo-zi", Literary Monuments and Problems of History of Asian Peoples, Moscow, vol. X, in Russian.)
- Гармония лука и лиры глазами Лао-цзы //Письменные памятники и проблемы истории культуры народов Востока. XIV. Ч.1. М.,1981. ("Harmony of the Bow and Lire, by Eyes of Lao-zi", Literary Monuments and Problems of History of Asian Peoples, Moscow, vol. XIV, in Russian.)
- Формальное построение «Сицы чжуань»//Письменные памятники Востока: Историко-филологические исследования: 1975. М., 1982.С.212–242. ("Formal Construction of "Xici zhuan"", Literary Monuments of Orient: Historico-Philological Studies, Moscow, vol. XX, pt. 1, in Russian.)
- Геометрические образы в древнекитайской философии //Актуальные проблемы философской и общественной мысли зарубежного Востока. Душанбе, 1983. ("The Geometrical Images in the Classic Chinese Philosophy", Actual Problems of Non-USSR Eastern Philosophy and Social Thought", Dushanbe, in Russian.)
- Об основном тексте письма [реки] Ло (Лошу бэнь вэнь) // Письменные памятники и проблемы истории культуры народов Востока. XX. Ч.1. М.,1986. C.131–137. ("On the Core Text of the Manuscript of [the River] Luo (Luoshu ben wen)", Literary Monuments and Problems of History of Asian Peoples, Moscow, vol. XX, pt. 1, in Russian.)
- Строй, семантика, контекст 14-го параграфа «Дао дэ цзина» //Письменные памятники и проблемы истории культуры народов Востока. XX. Ч.1. М.,1986. ("Structure, Semantics, Context of the 14th Chapter of "Dao de jing" ", Literary Monuments and Problems of History of Asian Peoples, Moscow, vol. XX, pt. 1, in Russian.)
- «Слава» и «позор» в § 28 «Дао дэ цзина»//Письменные памятники и проблемы истории культуры народов Востока. XXII. Ч.1. М.,1989. (""Glory" and "Shame" in the Chapter 28 of Dao De jing", Literary Monuments and Problems of History of Asian Peoples, Moscow, vol. XXII, pt. 1, in Russian.)
- Система категорий в «Шо гуа» // Письменные памятники и проблемы истории культуры народов Востока. XXIII. Ч.1. М.,1990. ("The Category System of "Shuo gua"", Literary Monuments and Problems of History of Asian Peoples, Moscow, vol. XXIII, pt. 1, in Russian.)
- Четыре вида «тождества» в «Мо-цзы» и типы гексаграмм «И цзина» // Письменные памятники и проблемы истории культуры народов Востока. XXIV.Ч.1. М., 1991. ("Four Types of "Sameness" in Mo-zi and the Types of Hexagrams of Yi-jing", Literary Monuments and Problems of History of Asian Peoples, Moscow, vol. XXIV, pt. 1, in Russian.)
- Composition des textes chinois anciens. From the first part (Outils de l’analyse formelle) of a book by Vladimir S. Spirin, presented by Karine Chemla and A. Volkov. Modeles et Structures des Textes Chinois Anciens les Formalistes Sovietiques en Sinologie / Extreme -Orient-Extreme — Occident. 13–1991. P. 31-56

== Sources ==
- Милибанд С. Д. Биобиблиографический словарь советских востоковедов М.,1977. С.527.
- Горский В. С. Историко-философское истолкование текста. Киев, 1981. С.162–163 на сайте Руниверс
- Попович М. В. Очерк развития логических идей в культурно-историческом контексте. Киев,1979. С.37–39.
- Карапетьянц А. М. [Рец. на:]В. С. Спирин. Построение древнекитайских текстов.// Народы Азии и Африки. 1978. No. 2.
- Китайская философия: Энциклопедический словарь. М., 1994. С.281. ISBN 5-244-00757-2
- Переломов Л. С. Конфуций: Лунь юй. Исследование, перевод с китайского, комментарии. М., 2000. По именному указателю.
- Логика: Биобиблиографический справочник (Россия-СССР-Россия). СПб.: Наука, 2001. С.380. ISBN 5-02-028488-2
- Меньшиков Л. Н. Памяти Владимира Семеновича Спирина. //Петербургское востоковедение. СПб., 2002. Вып. 10. С. 559–564.
- Крушинский А.А. К проблеме древнекитайской логики: исторический перелом и ретроспектива // Проблемы Дальнего Востока. 2015. No. 2. С. 123–133.
- Крушинский А.А. Исследования логической мысли Древнего Китая: тупики и выходы. Часть I. Историография проблемы // Вопросы философии. 2015. No. 4. С. 170–184.
- Крушинский А.А. Исследования логической мысли Древнего Китая: тупики и выходы. Часть II. Логика "И-цзина" // Вопросы философии. 2015. No.10. С. 163–179.
- Дёмин Р. Н. Фрагмент текста «Хуанди нэй цзин тай су», схематизированный В. С. Спириным (страничка из архива В. С. Спирина) //Петербургское востоковедение. СПб., 2002. Вып. 10. С. 565–567.
- Дёмин Р. Н., Кобзев А. И. Китайская текстология как строгая наука (к 80-летию со дня рождения В. С. Спирина) // Общество и государство в Китае: XXXIX научная конференция / Институт востоковедения РАН. — М., 2009. С.472–476.- ISBN 978-5-02-036391-5 (в обл.)
- Torchinov, E. A. Philosophical Studies (Sinology and lndology) in St.Petersburg (Leningrad), 1985—1990 // Philosophy East & West. Vol.42. No.2. April 1992. P.331.
- Духовная культура Китая: энциклопедия: в 5 т. /гл. ред. М. Л. Титаренко; Ин-т Дальнего Востока РАН.-М.:Вост. лит. Том 5. Наука, техническая и военная мысль, здравоохранение и образование / ред. М. Л. Титаренко и др. −2009. По имен.указ. ISBN 978-5-02-036381-6
- Рыков С. Ю. Проблема методологических оснований китайской классической философии в современной синологии // История философии. No. 14. М., ИФ РАН, 2009. С. 123–142.
- Биография на «orientalstudies»
