= Yin Wen =

Philosopher of the School of Names

Yin Wen 尹文
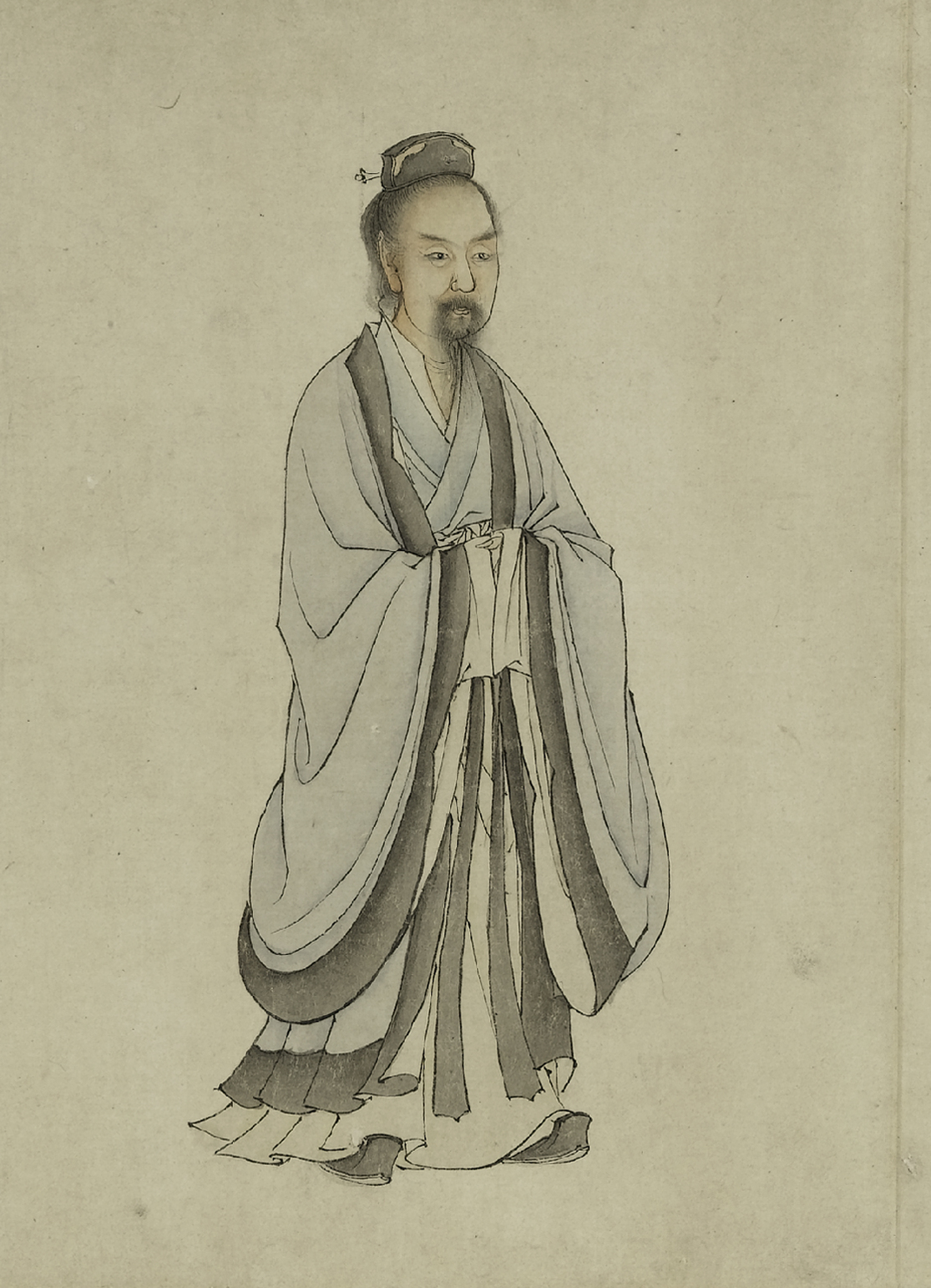
- Portrait by Hua Zuli (華祖立)
- Born: c. 350 B.C. State of Qi
- Died: c. 284 B.C. (aged c. 65 – 67)
- Occupation: Philosopher

Education
- Education: Jixia Academy (稷下學宮)

Philosophical work
- School: School of Names
- Main interests: Rectification of Names
- Notable works: Yin Wenzi

Yin Wen
- Chinese: 尹文
Transcriptions
Standard Mandarin
- Hanyu Pinyin: yǐn wén
- Bopomofo: ㄧㄣˇ ㄨㄣˊ
- Wade–Giles: yin^{1} wen^{3}
Wu
- Romanization: in^{1} ven^{6}
Yue: Cantonese
- Jyutping: wan^{5} man^{4}
Middle Chinese
- Middle Chinese: ywinX mjun
Old Chinese
- Baxter–Sagart (2014): /*m-qurʔ mə[n]/
- Zhengzhang: /*ɢʷlinʔ mɯn/

Yin Wen (c. 350 B.C. - c. 284 B.C.) was a Chinese philosopher and logician associated with the School of Names during the Warring States period. He is credited for the text Yin Wenzi (尹文子) and is mentioned in many philosophically adjacent texts. His ideas would heavily influence those of Gongsun Long.

== Career ==
Yin Wen operated as a scholar and politician in his native State of Qi, serving King Xuan of Qi and King Min of Qi, and was seemingly affiliated with Jixia Academy (稷下學宮).

Shuo Yuan documents an occasion where Yin Wen engaged in discourse with King Xuan of Qi, who asked what the duties of a ruler should be. He responded thusly, advocating for what can be seen as a minimal state:

人君之事，無為而能容下。夫事寡易從，法省易因；故民不以政獲罪也。大道容眾，大德容下；聖人寡為而天下理矣。《書》曰：『睿作聖』。詩人曰：『岐有夷之行，子孫其保之！』
"As for a ruler's duties, wuwei can accommodate. A matter that is few in number is easy to follow, and a law that is few in number is easy to enforce. Therefore, people will not receive government-enforced punishment as much. The Great Dao accommodates the masses; Great Virtue accommodates all; when the sages do little, all under heaven will be at peace. The Book of Documents says that wisdom makes a sage. The Classic of Poetry says: "Qi [岐] has a virtuous conduct; may his descendants protect him!"."

Zhuangzi records a similar discourse in its chapter on Gongsun Long, where he cites a debate between Yin Wen and King Min of Qi that appears in Yin Wenzi's Yiwen (佚文) chapter. This discourse would be repeated in Kongcongzi, Lüshi Chunqiu, and the Jifu (跡府) chapter of Gongsunlongzi.

King Min of Qi said: "While I admire scholars, in Qi, we have none.

Yin Wen said: "Now...if there were a person who exerted all of his effort for their ruler, observed filial conduct for their parents, were faithful to their friends, and obedient to their community, would this person be a scholar?"

King Qi replied: "Absolutely. This is truly who I consider to be called a scholar."

Yin Wen responded: "If milord obtains a person of this sort, would he make them his subject?"

King Qi pondered: "That is my wish, but it is an unattainable one."

Yin Wen said: "If this person were insulted in a public court and dared not fight back, would milord make them his subject?"

King Qi retorted: "For a scholar to be insulted and dare not fight back is an insult. I would not make them my subject."

Yin Wen then said: "Even if they were insulted but did not fight back, they have not lost the 'essence' of being a scholar." However, if milord does not consider them his subjects, then are those who you call scholars not scholars at all? The king's edict states that those who kill shall be put to death, and those who injure must be punished. The people fear the king's edict and, therefore, when insulted, dare not to fight. This is the way of the ruler, yet the ruler does not consider them his subjects; this is, itself, a punishment. Furthermore, milord considers not daring to fight back a disgrace, and must consider daring to fight an honour. This is what milord rewards and what the officials punish; what the superior approves, and what the law rejects. Rewards and punishments, right and wrong, are so contradictory that even ten Yellow Emperors could not rectify this situation."

== Yin Wenzi ==
Yin Wen has one eponymous text known as Yin Wenzi (尹文子). It is generally thought to be authentic, but alterations have almost certainly been made, leading to some historical allegations of forgery. The main reason for the conflict comes down to the Yin Wenzi's core texts being lost for several centuries and chapters seemingly being added, contradicting the Book of Han listing it as having one chapter. Therefore, ascribing ideas within the text to the historical Yin Wen should be conducted with caution.

Yin Weizi first argues for the primacy of the Dao, before immediately addressing the philosophy of the Rectification of Names, arguing that names (名) should correspond to reality (形) before quoting Confucius. The primary of the Dao is central to the text's model of government, with wu wei being at the forefront. It proposes a sequence of priorities for when the Dao is insufficient; when the Dao is not enough, use law; then tactics, power, and finally, influence. However, they each contradict each other, and so when extremes are reached, the end is coming, which therefore brings a beginning, creating a cycle.

With respect to names, Yin Wenzi argues for three categories and four rules (名有三科，法有四呈). The categories are as follows:

1. Names for things (物之名), corresponding to nouns.
2. Names for praise and blame (毀譽之名), corresponding to verbs and adjectives, similar to the praise and blame seen in Spring and Autumn Annals discourse.
3. Names for "things in general" (況謂之名).

The four rules go as follows, which ultimately become eight methods of government:

1. Unchanging rules (不變之法), such as those between ruler and minister.
2. Rules for customs (齊俗之法), such as ability and contempt or similarity and difference.
3. Rules for governing the masses (治眾之法), such as reward and punishment.
4. Rules for fairness and balance (平準之法), such as laws, measures, and weights.

== Personal life ==
Yin Wen was a Huang-Lao Daoist. He studied the Confucian classics, particularly the Classic of Poetry and Book of Documents. According to Liezi, Lao Chengzi studied under him for three years.

Later sources record Yin Wen as going to a Jixia Academy (稷下學宮), but this is not reflected in contemporary works; if correct, anecdotal evidence places him there during the reigns of King Xuan of Qi or King Min of Qi. He was notably associated with Song Keng 宋牼, another member of the academy who attended during its 5th year, and is mentioned several times in Mencius.

In Kongcongzi, Yin Wen is documented as having a son who did not look like him, spiralling him into a rage until Zi Si calmed him down with citations of Emperor Shun and Emperor Yao, wherein he relented.

== Legacy ==
Gongsun Long saw Yin Wen as a chief inspiration for his philosophical works, creating works such as the White Horse Dialogue that culminated in his debate with Kong Chuan.

Fung Yu-lan identifies Yin Wen as laying the groundwork for Mozi and Yang Zhu's later philosophies, noting six key features of his philosophy;

1. In intercourse with all things, to begin with knowing the prejudices.
2. In talking about the tolerance of mind, to call it the action of the mind.
3. Men's passions desire but little.
4. To endure insult without feeling it a disgrace, so as to save people from fighting.
5. To check aggression and propose disarmament in order to save their generation from war.
6. To desire peace of the world in order to preserve the life of the people; to seek no more than is sufficient for nourishing oneself and others.
