= Zhenming =

Zhenming was a Chinese era name used by several emperors of China. It may refer to:

- Zhenming (禎明, 587–589), era name used by Chen Shubao, emperor of the Chen dynasty
- Zhenming (貞明, 915–921), era name used by Zhu Youzhen, emperor of Later Liang (also used by concurrent rulers of Wuyue and Min Kingdom)

== See also ==
- Rectification of names or Zhengming, a Confucian concept
