= Legal Eagle =

Legal Eagle or LegalEagle may refer to:

== Film and television ==
- Legal Eagles, a 1986 American trial film starring Robert Redford and Debra Winger
- Legal Eagles (TV series), a 2017 Singaporean drama starring Felicia Chin and Zhang Zhenhuan
- Legal Eagle, a show-within-a-show in the 1972–1985 American cartoon television series Fat Albert and the Cosby Kids, featuring a crime-fighting cartoon eagle character

== Law ==
- LegalEagle, a YouTube channel run by American lawyer Devin Stone
- Eagles hunted with permits under Bald and Golden Eagle Protection Act in the U.S.
- Eagles harvested with permission under eagle feather law in the U.S.

== Other uses ==
- Milholland Legal Eagle, a 1998 American aircraft design kit that is FAR Part 103 "legal"
- Legal Eagle, a cog from the 2003 video game Toontown Online

== See also ==
- Eagle (disambiguation)
- Legal (disambiguation)
