= White Horse Dialogue =

Chinese philosophical dialogue

- Traditional Chinese: 白馬論
- Simplified Chinese: 白马论
- Literal meaning: white horse dialogue
Transcriptions
Standard Mandarin
- Hanyu Pinyin: báimǎ lùn

白 馬 非 馬
white horse {is not} horse

— Gongsun Longzi

The White Horse Dialogue (Chinese: 白馬論) is a chapter of the Gongsun Longzi, a Warring States period text attributed to Gongsun Long (fl. 284–259 BCE). In the dialogue, two unnamed speakers debate the proposition "a white horse is not a horse" (白馬非馬, bái mǎ fēi mǎ). The text has been the subject of scholarly criticism and commentary for over two thousand years and is considered one of the best-known arguments from the School of Names.

A central interpretive question is the meaning of 非 (fēi, "is not"), which can express either non-identity ("is not the same as") or exclusion from a category ("is not a member of"). The two speakers appear to be operating under different readings of this word, one treating the proposition as a claim about concepts and the other treating it as a claim about animals. Whether the dialogue was intended as serious philosophy, sophistry, or some combination of the two is disputed. In Western philosophy, propositions such as this have been intensely studied in depth since the linguistic turn in Analytic philosophy.

== The original text ==
Most of Gongsun's writings have been lost; the received Gongsun Longzi text contains only six of the recorded fourteen original chapters. Parts of the dialogue are dislocated and a small number of words are theorized to have been lost early in the text's transmission history. Thus, some commentators and translators rearrange some sentences for clarity. Classical Chinese does not mark grammatical number. Where 'a horse' or 'a white horse' appears in this translation, the original is equally consistent with a plural or generic reading. The dialogue is between two unnamed speakers:

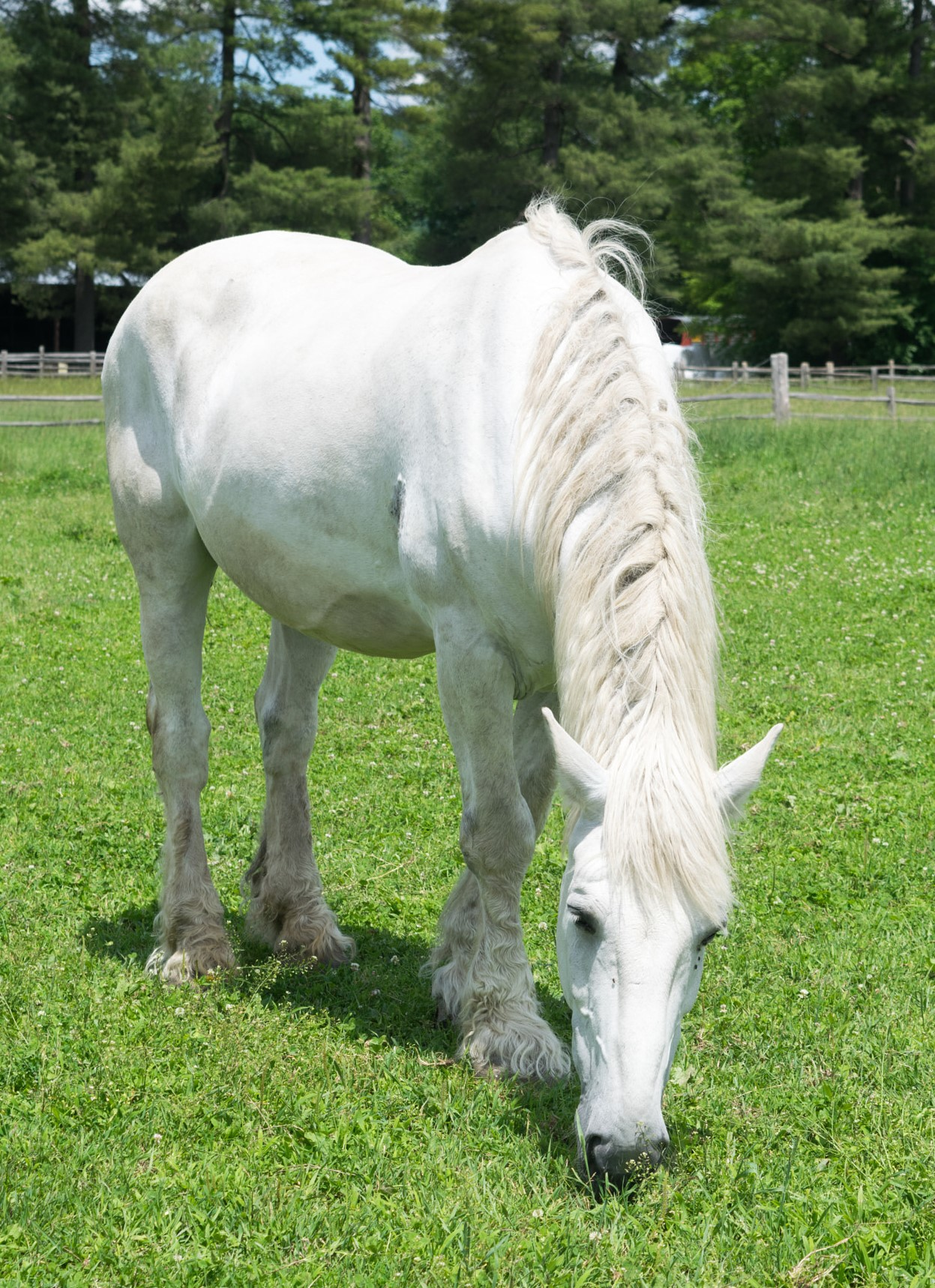
Is this white horse a horse?

"Can 'a white horse is not a horse' be asserted?"

[Advocate] "It can."

[Objector] "How so?"

[Advocate] "'Horse' is what designates shape. 'White' is what designates color. What designates color is not what designates shape. Therefore I say: a white horse is not a horse."

[Objector] "If there is a white horse, one cannot say there is no horse. If one cannot say there is no horse, does that not mean there is a horse? Since having a white horse counts as having a horse, how can the white [one] not be a horse?"

[Advocate] "If one seeks a horse, yellow and black horses may all be delivered. If one seeks a white horse, yellow and black horses may not be delivered. Suppose a white horse were [just] a horse. Then what is sought [in the two cases] would be the same. If what is sought were the same, then 'white' would not differ from 'horse.' If what is sought does not differ, how is it that yellow and black horses are acceptable [in one case] and unacceptable [in the other]? That acceptable and unacceptable are mutually opposed is clear. Therefore yellow and black horses are the same in that they can answer to 'there is a horse,' but cannot answer to 'there is a white horse.' This is a white horse's not being a horse: it is certain."

— "2: 白馬論", 公孫龍子

The dialogue continues with deliberations over colored and colorless horses and whether white and horse can be separated from white horse.

Other Gongsun Longzi chapters discuss "white horse"-related concepts of: jian 堅 'hard; hardness', and bai 白 'white; whiteness', ming 名 'name; term', shi 實 'solid; true, actual; fact, reality', the abstract zhi 指 'finger; pointing; designation; universal' (like "whiteness"), and the concrete wu 物 'thing; object; particular' (like "a white horse").

== Interpretations and proposed solutions ==
A common misunderstanding is that this paradox arises due to the lack of articles in the Chinese language. While the absence of articles in Chinese can make the interpretation of phrases more challenging, this paradox serves as an entry point for more profound philosophical explorations rather than being a straightforward result of Chinese grammar.

Essentially, this paradox explores the ways in which humans categorize and conceptualize "things" in minds and through language. The fact that all white horses are indeed horses does not imply that the term "horses" refers exclusively to white horses (it also includes horses of other colors, such as brown and black.). This paradox emphasizes the importance of the precision required in the language use and reveals how the complexity of language can lead to unexpected confusions.

According to A. C. Graham, this "A white horse is not a horse" paradox plays upon the ambiguity of whether the 'is' in the statement means:

1. "Is a member of the class x"; or
2. "Is identical to x".

In other words, the expression "white horse is not horse" is ambiguous between "white horse is not synonymous with horse" (true because white horse is more specific than horse), versus "a white horse is not a member of the set of horses" (obviously false). The Advocate in the dialogue is asserting a lack of identity between horses and white horses, while the Objector is interpreting the Advocate's statement as a claim that the category of horses does not include white ones.

Beyond the inherent semantic ambiguities of "A white horse is not a horse," the first line of the White Horse Dialogue obscurely asks 可乎 ('Can it be that ...?'). This dialogue could be an attempted proof that a white horse is not a horse, or a question if such a statement is possible, or both. Bryan W. Van Norden suggests that "the Advocate is only arguing that 'a white horse is not a horse' could be true, given a certain interpretation. He might acknowledge that, in another interpretation, 'a white horse is a horse.'"

An alternative interpretation is offered in Feng Youlan's A History of Chinese Philosophy:

Strictly speaking, names or terms are divided into those that are abstract and those that are concrete. The abstract term denotes the universal, the concrete term the particular. The particular is the denotation, and the universal the connotation, of the term. In western inflected languages there is no difficulty in distinguishing between the particular ('white' or 'horse') and the abstract ('whiteness' or 'horseness'). In Chinese, however, as the written characters are ideographic and pictorial and lack all inflection, there is no possible way, as far as the form of individual words is concerned, of distinguishing between abstract and concrete terms. Thus in Chinese the word designating a particular horse and that designating the universal, 'horseness,' are written and pronounced in the same way. Similarly with other terms, so that such words as 'horse' and 'white', being used to designate both the concrete particular and the abstract universal, thus hold two values.

However, there are recent histories of Chinese philosophy that do not subscribe to Feng's interpretation. Other contemporary philosophers and sinologists who have analyzed the dialogue include A. C. Graham, Chad Hansen, Cristoph Harbsmeier, Kirill Ole Thompson, and Bryan W. Van Norden.

== Historic influence ==
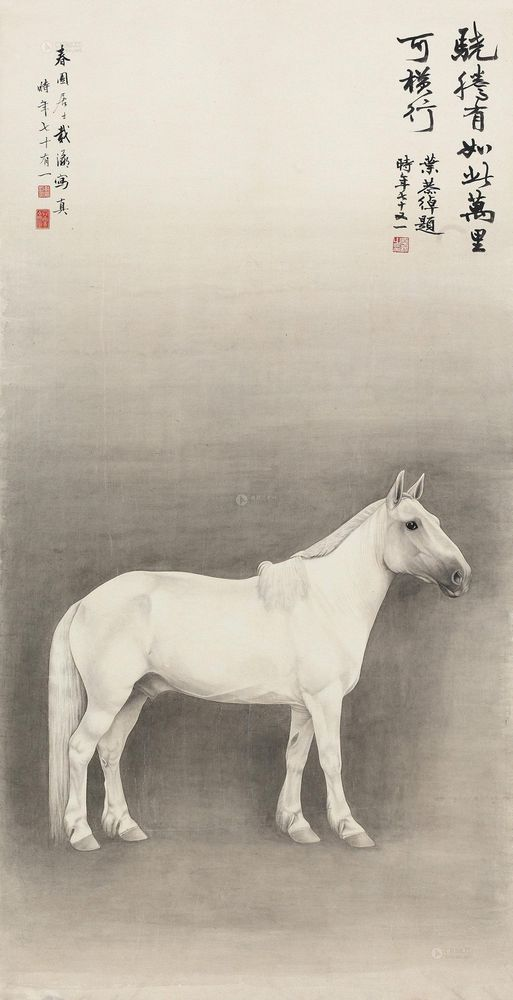
A white horse drawn by Zai Ying

In the Chinese philosophical tradition, the White Horse Dialogue's significance is evident from the number of Chinese classic texts directly or indirectly discussing it. The Liezi, which lists and criticizes the paradoxes of Gongsun Long as "perversions of reason and sense", explains "'A white horse is not a horse' because the name diverges from the shape."

Two Zhuangzi chapters (17 and 33) mock Gongsun Long, and another (2) combines his zhi 指 'attribute' and ma 馬 'horse' notions in the same context:

To use an attribute to show that attributes are not attributes is not as good as using a nonattribute to show that attributes are not attributes. To use a horse to show that a horse is not a horse is not as good as using a non-horse to show that a horse is not a horse, Heaven and earth are one attribute; the ten thousand things are one horse.

The Mengzi (6A4) notes that bai 白 'white' has different connotations whether one is using it to refer to a graying person (who is worthy of respect because of his or her age) or a white horse (which should be treated like any other animal):

Mencius said, 'There is no difference between our pronouncing a white horse to be white and our pronouncing a white man to be white. But is there no difference between the regard with which we acknowledge the age of an old horse and that with which we acknowledge the age of an old man? And what is it which is called righteousness? The fact of a man's being old? Or the fact of our giving honor to his age?'

Other early "a white horse is not a horse" references are found in the Hanfeizi (32), Mozi (11B), and Zhanguoce (19.2).

== See also ==
- All horses are the same color
- Copula (linguistics) § Meanings
- Third man argument
- Use–mention distinction
