= Hui Shi =

4th-century BCE Chinese philosopher of the School of Names

Hui Shi 惠施
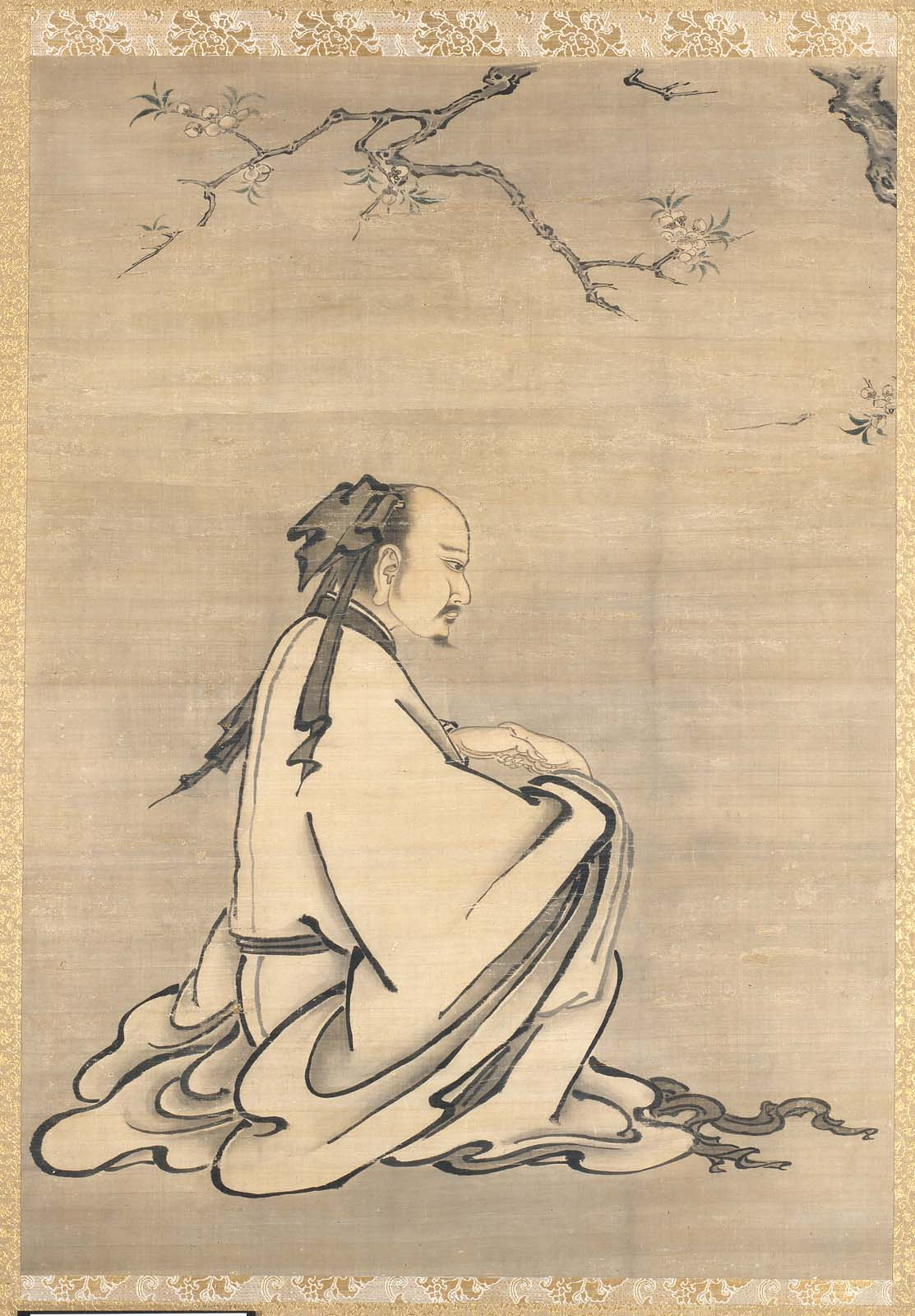
- Portrait by Kano Tan'yû (Edo period)
- Born: c. 370 B.C. State of Song
- Died: c. 310 B.C. (aged c. 60); State of Wei
- Occupation: Philosopher
- Known for: Relationship to Zhuang Zhou

Philosophical work
- School: School of Names
- Main interests: Paradoxes

Prime Minister (相) of the State of Wei
- Monarch: King Hui of Wei

Hui Shi
- Chinese: 惠施
Transcriptions
Standard Mandarin
- Hanyu Pinyin: Huì Shī
- Bopomofo: ㄏㄨㄟˋ ㄕ
- Wade–Giles: Hui^{4} Shih^{1}
Wu
- Romanization: we^{6} sy^{1}
Yue: Cantonese
- Jyutping: wai^{6} si^{1}
Middle Chinese
- Middle Chinese: hwejH sye
Old Chinese
- Baxter–Sagart (2014): /*[ɢ]ʷˤi[j]-s l̥aj/
- Zhengzhang: /*ɢʷiːds hljal/

Hui Shi (Chinese: 惠施; pinyin: Huì Shī; Wade–Giles: Hui^{⁴} Shih^{¹}; 370–310 BCE), or Huizi (Chinese: 惠子; pinyin: Huìzǐ; Wade–Giles: Hui^{⁴} Tzu^{³}; "Master Hui"), was a Warring States period Chinese philosopher, and, according to the Lushi Chunqiu, a prime minister of the Wei state (Liang) said to have written a code of laws. A representative of the School of Names (Logicians), he is famous for ten paradoxes about the relativity of time and space, for instance, "I set off for Yue (southeastern China) today and came there yesterday."

== Bibliography ==
The Yiwenzhi attributes an eponymous one-chapter philosophical work to Hui Shi named Huizi (惠子), but it is no longer extant, probably being lost prior to the Tang dynasty. For this reason, knowledge of his philosophy relies on the several Chinese classic texts that refer to him, including the Zhan Guo Ce, Lüshi Chunqiu, Han Feizi, Xunzi, and most frequently, the Zhuangzi. Nine Zhuangzi chapters mention Hui Shi, calling him "Huizi" 26 times and "Hui Shi" 9 times. "Under Heaven" (chapter 33), which summarizes Warring States philosophies, contains all of the latter 9 references by name.

After the death of the Prime Minister of Liang, Shuo Yuan records Hui Shi as rushing at the opportunity to serve the state:

梁相死，惠子欲之梁，渡河而遽墮水中，船人救之。船人曰：「子欲何之而遽也？」曰：「梁無相，吾欲往相之。」船人曰：「子居船橶之間而困，無我則子死矣，子何能相梁乎？」惠子曰：「子居艘楫之間則吾不如子；至於安國家，全社稷，子之比我，蒙蒙如未視之狗耳。」
When the Prime Minister of Liang died, Master Hui desired to serve in the position. He hurriedly tried to cross the river, but fell in and was saved by a boatman. The boatman said: "Sir, just why do you wish to rush?" Hui replied: "Liang has no Prime Minister, so I wish to go and serve as them." The boatman retorted: "If you were to live amongst ships and oars, you would be no match. Without me, you would have died. How, then, could you serve as Prime Minister?" to which Hui said: "Correct: If I were to live amongst oars and boats, I would be no match for you. As for serving the kingdom, this entire nation, compared to me, you are no better than a dog that has neither seen nor heard anything."

== Philosophy ==
Belonging to the School of Names, Hui Shi's philosophy is characterised by arguments centred around the relativity of the concepts of sameness (同 tong) and difference (異 yi). He frequently used analogies and paradoxes to convey his arguments.

Sinologist Hansen took historical commentary on the Zhuangzi as considering Hui Shi's central statement to be that "Heaven, earth and I were born together, the myriad things and I are one." A "poetic expression of the everything concept", Hansen questioned whether a historical Zhuangzi himself would have ever tried to make such a concept. In relation to the Zhuangzi, it is a "classic" or "key" example to understanding the work as "endorsing ideas and then abandoning them."

=== The Ten Theses ===
The final chapter of the Zhuangzi, Tian Xia (天下 'Under Heaven') claims that Hui Shi held ten main opinions, referred to as "The Ten Theses" or "The Ten Paradoxes", and lists them as follows:

1. The largest thing has nothing beyond it; it is called the One of largeness. The smallest thing has nothing within it; it is called the One of smallness.
2. That which has no thickness cannot be piled up; yet it is a thousand li in dimension.
3. Heaven is as low as earth; mountains and marshes are on the same level.
4. The sun at noon is the sun setting. The thing born is the thing dying.
5. Great similarities are different from little similarities; these are called the little similarities and differences. The ten thousand things are all similar and are all different; these are called the great similarities and differences.
6. The southern region has no limit and yet has a limit.
7. I set off for Yueh today and came there yesterday.
8. Linked rings can be separated.
9. I know the center of the world: it is north of Yen and south of Yueh.
10. Let love embrace the ten thousand things; Heaven and earth are a single body.

The list in the Tian Xia does not, however, explain how Hui Shi argued these theses. Though the theses seem haphazard, and the list lacking in logical structure, Chris Fraser argues that they can be divided into four natural groups:

1. The basic principles (theses 1, 5 and 10) – These are non-paradoxical statements of Hui Shi's ontological doctrines. Thesis 1 presents the relativity of the concept of oneness. At the extremes, the One can be interpreted as the smallest possible part, with nothing inside it, or the largest possible whole, with everything inside it. (The idea of a "smallest thing" is sometimes used to argue that Hui Shi was an atomist, but Fraser proposes that it might be a geometrical point rather than an atom.) Thesis 5 represents the claim that sameness and difference are also relative and perspective-dependent, and that two things can be the same in one way while differing in another. Finally, thesis 10 contains an ethical element alongside an ontological one, suggesting that, if all things can be considered to form one whole, us included, we should treat all things with the same love with which we treat ourselves.
2. The paradoxes of infinitesimals and part-whole relations (theses 2 and 8) – Thesis 2 presents the paradox of the infinite divisibility of things into dimensionless, infinitesimal points (the "smallest things" from thesis 1) despite the seeming impossibility of adding together dimensionless objects to yield anything with thickness. Thesis 8 is obscure, but Fraser suggests it could be explained through thesis 2: if the rings are formed entirely of infinitesimal points, which take up no space, then there should be nothing there to prevent the rings from passing through each other.
3. The paradoxes of spatial relations (theses 3, 6, and 9) – Thesis 3 applies the relativism of thesis 5 to spatial relations: if "the ten thousand things are all similar and are all different", then there is a certain scale or perspective from which the apparently great distance between heaven and earth is reduced to nothing. Theses 6 and 9 concern the indexicality of the cardinal directions, i.e., the meaning of "south" changes the further one travels south.
4. The paradoxes of temporal relations (theses 4 and 7) – Thesis 4 can be explained through the multiplicity of perspectives: while the sun appears high here, to someone further east it must appear to be setting. Similarly, from the moment a thing is born, even as it grows, it is at the same time approaching its death. Thesis 7 is unclear, but also seems to relate to the relativity of time.

=== Miscellaneous Paradoxes ===
Another passage from the Tian Xia attributes 21 more paradoxes to Hui Shi and other members of the School of Names, which they are said to have used in their debates. Compared to the Ten Theses listed above, they appear even more absurd and unsolvable:

惠施以此為大觀於天下而曉辯者，天下之辯者相與樂之。卵有毛，雞三足，郢有天下，犬可以為羊，馬有卵，丁子有尾，火不熱，山出口，輪不蹍地，目不見，指不至，至不絕，龜長於蛇，矩不方，規不可以為圓，鑿不圍枘，飛鳥之景未嘗動也，鏃矢之疾而有不行不止之時，狗非犬，黃馬、驪牛三，白狗黑，孤駒未嘗有母，一尺之捶，日取其半，萬世不竭。辯者以此與惠施相應，終身無窮。
Hui Shi by such sayings as these made himself very conspicuous throughout the kingdom, and was considered an able debater. All other debaters vied with one another and delighted in similar exhibitions. [They would say,] "There are feathers in an egg." "A fowl has three feet." "The kingdom belongs to Ying." "A dog might have been [called] a sheep." "A horse has eggs." "A tadpole has a tail." "Fire is not hot." "A mountain gives forth a voice." "A wheel does not tread on the ground." "The eye does not see." "The finger indicates, but needs not touch [the object]." "Where you come to may not be the end." "The tortoise is longer than the snake." "The carpenter's square is not square." "A compass should not itself be round." "A chisel does not surround its handle." "The shadow of a flying bird does not [itself] move." "Swift as the arrowhead is, there is a time when it is neither flying nor at rest." "A dog is not a hound." "A bay horse and a black ox are three." "A white dog is black." "A motherless colt never had a mother." "If from a stick a foot long you every day take the half of it, in a myriad ages it will not be exhausted." It was in this way that the debaters responded to Hui Shi, all their lifetime, without coming to an end.

— Zhuangzi, chapter 33 (Legge translation)

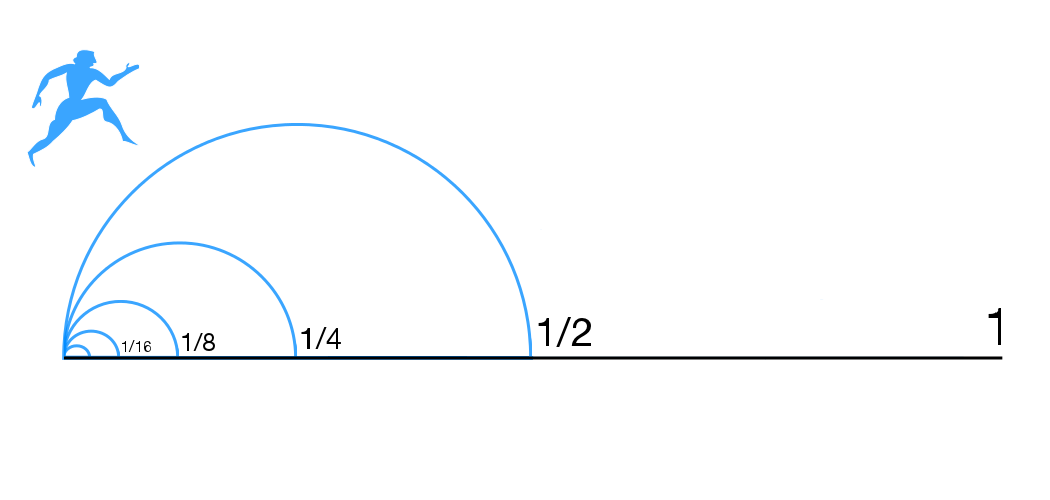
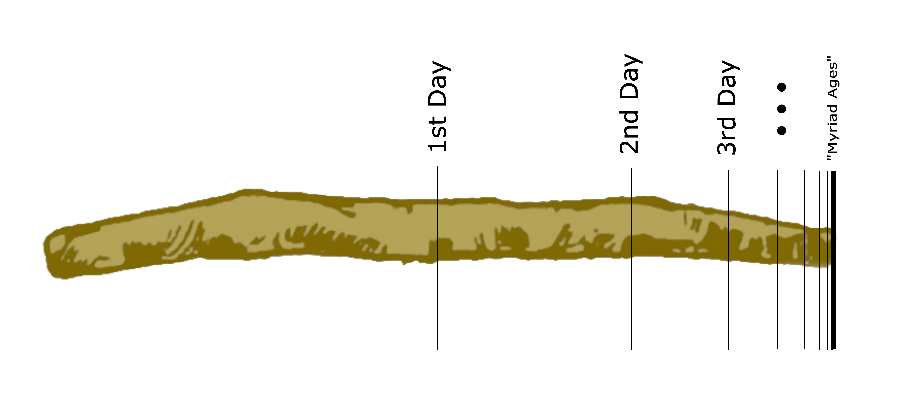
Zeno's paradox of an endlessly divisible race track resembles Hui Shi's paradox of an endlessly divided stick.

The last statement in particular, "if from a stick a foot long you every day take the half of it, in a myriad ages it will not be exhausted" is notable for its resemblance to the Dichotomy paradox described by Zeno of Elea. Zeno's paradox takes the example of a runner on a finite race track, arguing that, because runner must reach the halfway point before they can reach the finish line, and the length of the track can be divided into halves infinitely many times, it should be impossible for them to reach the finish line in a finite amount of time. The Mohist canon appears to propose a solution to this paradox by arguing that in moving across a measured length, the distance is not covered in successive fractions of the length, but in one stage.

Due to the lack of surviving works, most of the other paradoxes listed are difficult to interpret.

=== Fondness for Analogies ===
A dialogue in the Shuo Yuan portrays Hui Shi as having a tendency to overuse analogies (譬 pi, which can also be translated as "illustrative examples") with Hui Shi justifying this habit with the claim that communication is impossible without analogies:

A client said to the King of Liang, “In talking about things, Hui Shi is fond of using analogies. If you don’t let him use analogies, he won’t be able to speak.” The King said, “Agreed.” The next day he saw Hui Shi and said, “I wish that when you speak about things, you speak directly, without using analogies.” Hui Shi said, “Suppose there’s a man here who doesn’t know what a dan is. If he says, ‘What are the features of a dan like?’ and we answer, saying, ‘The features of a dan are like a dan,’ then would that communicate it?” The King said, “It would not.” “Then if we instead answered, ‘The features of a dan are like a bow, but with a bamboo string,’ then would he know?” The King said, “It can be known.” Hui Shi said, “Explanations are inherently a matter of using what a person knows to communicate what he doesn’t know, thereby causing him to know it. Now if you say, ‘No analogies,’ that’s inadmissible.” The King said, “Good!”

A. C. Graham argues that this philosophical position suggests some affinity between Hui Shi and the Mohists, in their shared opinion that "the function of names is to communicate that an object is like the objects one knows by the name"

== Relation to Zhuangzi ==
Most of the other Zhuangzi passages portray Hui Shi (Huizi) as a friendly rival of Zhuangzi (Wade–Giles: Chuang^{¹} Tzu^{³}). Hui Shi acts as an intellectual foil who argues the alternative viewpoint, or criticizes the Daoist perspective, often with moments of humor. The best known of the Zhuang-Hui dialogues concerns the subjectivity of happiness.

Chuang Tzu and Hui Tzu were strolling along the dam of the Hao River when Chuang Tzu said, "See how the minnows come out and dart around where they please! That's what fish really enjoy!"

Hui Tzu said, "You're not a fish - how do you know what fish enjoy?"

Chuang Tzu said, "You're not I, so how do you know I don't know what fish enjoy?"

Hui Tzu said, "I'm not you, so I certainly don't know what you know. On the other hand, you're certainly not a fish ‑ so that still proves you don't know what fish enjoy!"

Chuang Tzu said, "Let's go back to your original question, please. You asked me how I know what fish enjoy ‑ so you already knew I knew it when you asked the question. I know it by standing here beside the Hao."

— Zhuangzi, 17, tr. Watson 1968:188-9

According to these ancient Daoist stories, Zhuangzi and Hui Shi remained friendly rivals until death.

Chuang Tzu was accompanying a funeral when he passed by the grave of Hui Tzu. Turning to his attendants, he said, "There was once a plasterer who, if he got a speck of mud on the tip of his nose no thicker than a fly's wing, would get his friend Carpenter Shih to slice it off for him. Carpenter Shih, whirling his hatchet with a noise like the wind, would accept the assignment and proceed to slice, removing every bit of mud without injury to the nose, while the plasterer just stood there completely unperturbed. Lord Yuan of Sung, hearing of this feat, summoned Carpenter Shih and said, 'Could you try performing it for me?' But Carpenter Shih replied, 'It's true that I was once able to slice like that but the material I worked on has been dead these many years.' Since you died, Master Hui, I have had no material to work on. There's no one I can talk to any more."

— Zhuangzi, 24, tr. Watson 1968:269

Chad Hansen (2003:146) interprets this lament as "the loss of a philosophical partnership, of two like-minded but disagreeing intellectual companions engaged in the joys of productive philosophical argument."
