= Mirth Provisions =

Cannabis-infused beverage company

- Industry: Cannabis edibles
- Founded: 2014
- Founder: Adam Stites
- Headquarters: Longview, Washington, US
- Area served: Arizona; California; Oregon; Washington
- Website: www.mirthprovisions.com

Mirth Provisions is a company that sells cannabis-infused beverages. Mirth was founded in 2014 by Adam Stites and is based in Longview, Washington.

== Overview ==
Mirth's beverage brand is Legal, which is available in several flavors, the first of which was cold-brewed coffee. Legal beverages contain cannabinoid profiles dominant in THC, CBD, or both. They are sold for both recreational and medical purposes. As of March 2016, they were available in Washington, Oregon, California, and Arizona.

Beverages were about 4% of the cannabis market in 2014 but had fallen to around 1.5% of the market in 2016. Mirth had 36% of the cannabis-infused beverage market in the middle of 2016.
