= Legalism =

Legalism may refer to:

- Legalism (Chinese philosophy), a Chinese school of thought based on the idea that a highly efficient and powerful government is the key to social order
- Legalism (Western philosophy), a concept in Western jurisprudence
- Legalism (theology), a sometimes pejorative term relating to a number of concepts in Christian theology
- Aggressive legalism, a concept in commercial policy
- Autocratic legalism, the weaponization of legal systems
- Liberal legalism, a theory on the relationship between politics and law
