= Principle of legality =

Principle of legality may refer to:

- Principle of legality in criminal law, legal doctrine requiring a prior published law before someone can be convicted of a crime
- Principle of legality in French criminal law, the same doctrine as it applies to France
- Principle of Legality (Australia), a judicial presumption about the wording used in enacting legislation
