= Gongsun Long =

Chinese Logician (c. 320 – 250 BC)

- 公孫龍
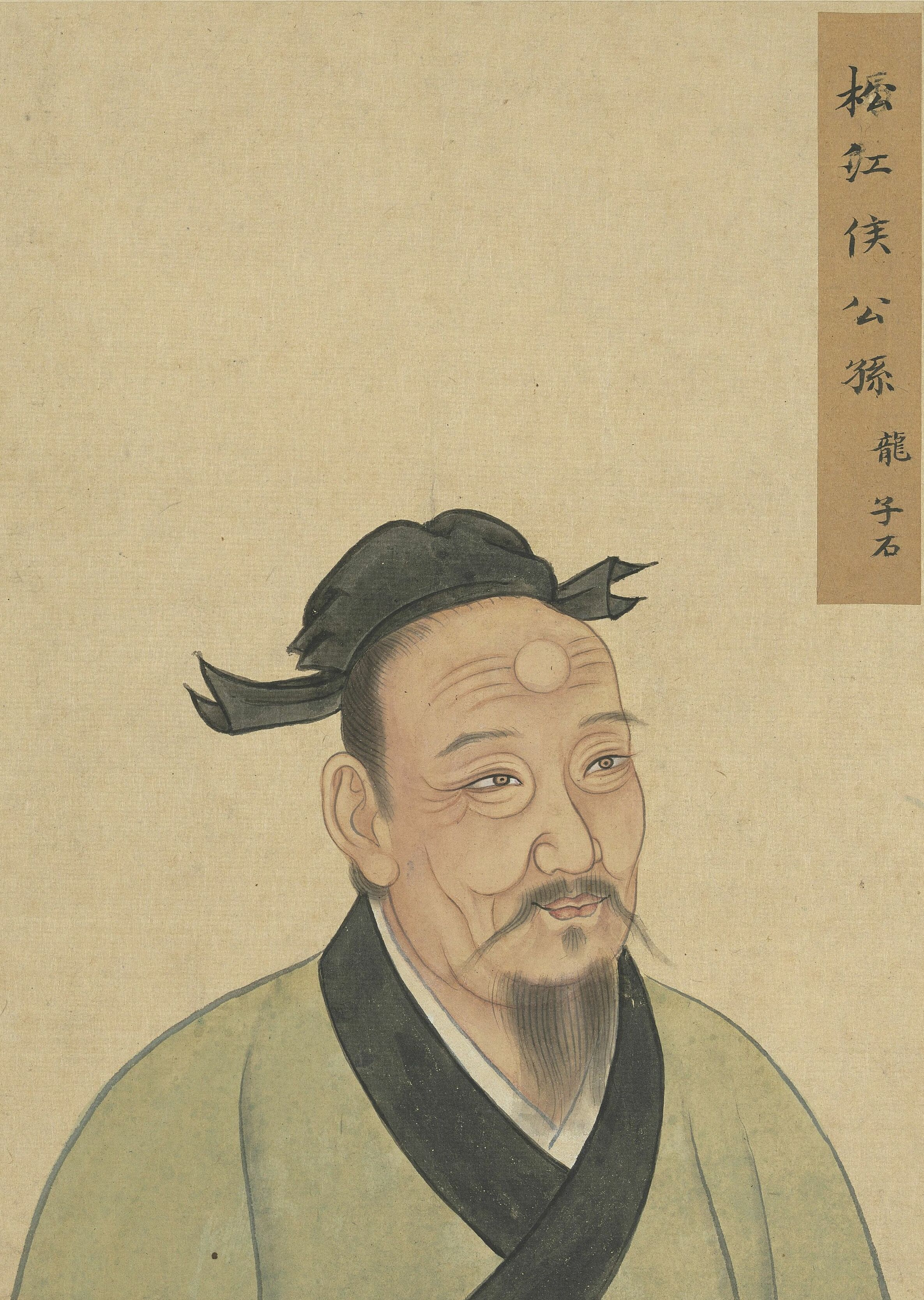
- Born: c. 320 BC
- Died: 250 BC

Philosophical work
- Era: Ancient Chinese philosophy
- School: School of Names
- Notable works: Gongsun Longzi (公孫龍子)

Chinese name
- Traditional Chinese: 公孫龍
- Simplified Chinese: 公孙龙
Transcriptions
Standard Mandarin
- Hanyu Pinyin: Gōngsūn Lóng
- Wade–Giles: Kung^{1}-sun^{1} Lung^{2}

Alternative Chinese name
- Chinese: 子秉
Transcriptions
Standard Mandarin
- Hanyu Pinyin: Zibǐng
- Wade–Giles: Tzŭ^{3}-ping^{3}

Gongsun Long (c. 320 – 250 BC), courtesy name Zibing, was a Chinese philosopher, writer, and member of the School of Names, also known as the Logicians, of ancient Chinese philosophy. Gongsun ran a school and received patronage from rulers, advocating peaceful means of resolving disputes amid the martial culture of the Warring States period. His collected works comprise the Gongsun Longzi (公孫龍子) anthology. Comparatively few details are known about his life, and much of his work has been lost—only six of the fourteen essays he originally authored are still extant.

In book 17 of the Zhuangzi, Gongsun speaks of himself:

When young, I studied the way of the former kings. When I grew up, I understood the practice of kindness and duty. I united the same and different, separated hard from white, made so the not-so and admissible the inadmissible. I confounded the wits of the hundred schools and exhausted the eloquence of countless speakers. I took myself to have reached the ultimate.

He is best known for a series of paradoxes in the tradition of Yin Wen and Hui Shi, including "white horses are not horses", "when no thing is not the pointed-out, to point out is not to point out", and "there is no 1 in 2". These paradoxes seem to suggest a similarity to the discovery in Greek philosophy that pure logic may lead to apparently absurd conclusions.

== Rectification of names ==
Although not done justice by English translation, professor Zhenbin Sun considers Gongsun Long’s work on ming-shi, or name and reality, the most "profound and systematic" of the School of Names. As Gongsun Long enjoys the favor or rulers, his work also concerns social order.

The Gongsun Long Zi reads:

Heaven, earth, and their products are all things [物 wu]. When things possess the characteristics of things without exceeding them, there is actuality [shi]. When actuality actually fulfills its function as actuality, without wanting, there is order [位 wei]. To be out of order is to fall into disorder. To remain in order is to be correct. What is correct is used to rectify what is incorrect. [What is incorrect is not used to] doubt what is correct. To rectify is to rectify actuality, and to rectify the name [ming] corresponding to it.

== White Horse dialogue ==
In the White Horse Dialogue (白馬論; Báimǎ lùn), one interlocutor (sometimes called the "sophist") defends the truth of the statement "White horses are not horses," while the other interlocutor (sometimes called the "objector") disputes the truth of this statement. This has been interpreted in a number of ways.

Possibly the simplest interpretation is to see it as based on a confusion of class and identity. The argument, by this interpretation, plays upon an ambiguity of the negative copula "is not" (非). The expression "X is not Y" (X非Y) can mean either

- "X is not a member (or subset) of set Y"
- "X is not identical to Y"

The sentence "White horses are not horses" would normally be taken to assert the obviously false claim that white horses are not part of the group of horses. However, the "sophist" in the dialogue defends the statement under the interpretation, "Not all horses are white horses". The latter statement is actually true, since—as the "sophist" explains—"horses" includes horses that are white, yellow, brown, etc., while "white horses" includes only white horses, and excludes the others. A.C. Graham proposed this interpretation and illustrated it with an analogy. The "Objector" assumes that "a white horse is not a horse" is parallel to "a sword is not a weapon," but the "Sophist" is treating the statement as parallel to "a sword is not a blade." Other interpretations have been put forward by Fung Yu-lan and Chad Hansen, among others.

This work has been viewed by some as a serious logical discourse, by others as a facetious work of sophistry, and finally by some as a combination of the two.

== Other works ==
He was also responsible for several other essays (論; lùn; 'discourses', 'dialogues'), as short as 300 characters.

- "On Pointing at Things" (指物論; Zhǐwù Lùn): An enigmatic discussion on reference and the referent, or designation and the designated.
- "On Understanding Change" (通變論; Tōngbiàn Lùn)
- "On Hardness and Whiteness" (堅白論; Jiānbái Lùn): based on the example of a stone that is both hard and white.
- "On Name and Substance" (名實論; Míngshí Lùn)
- "Storehouse of Traces" (跡府; Jifǔ)
