= Han Feizi =

Ancient Chinese Legalist text

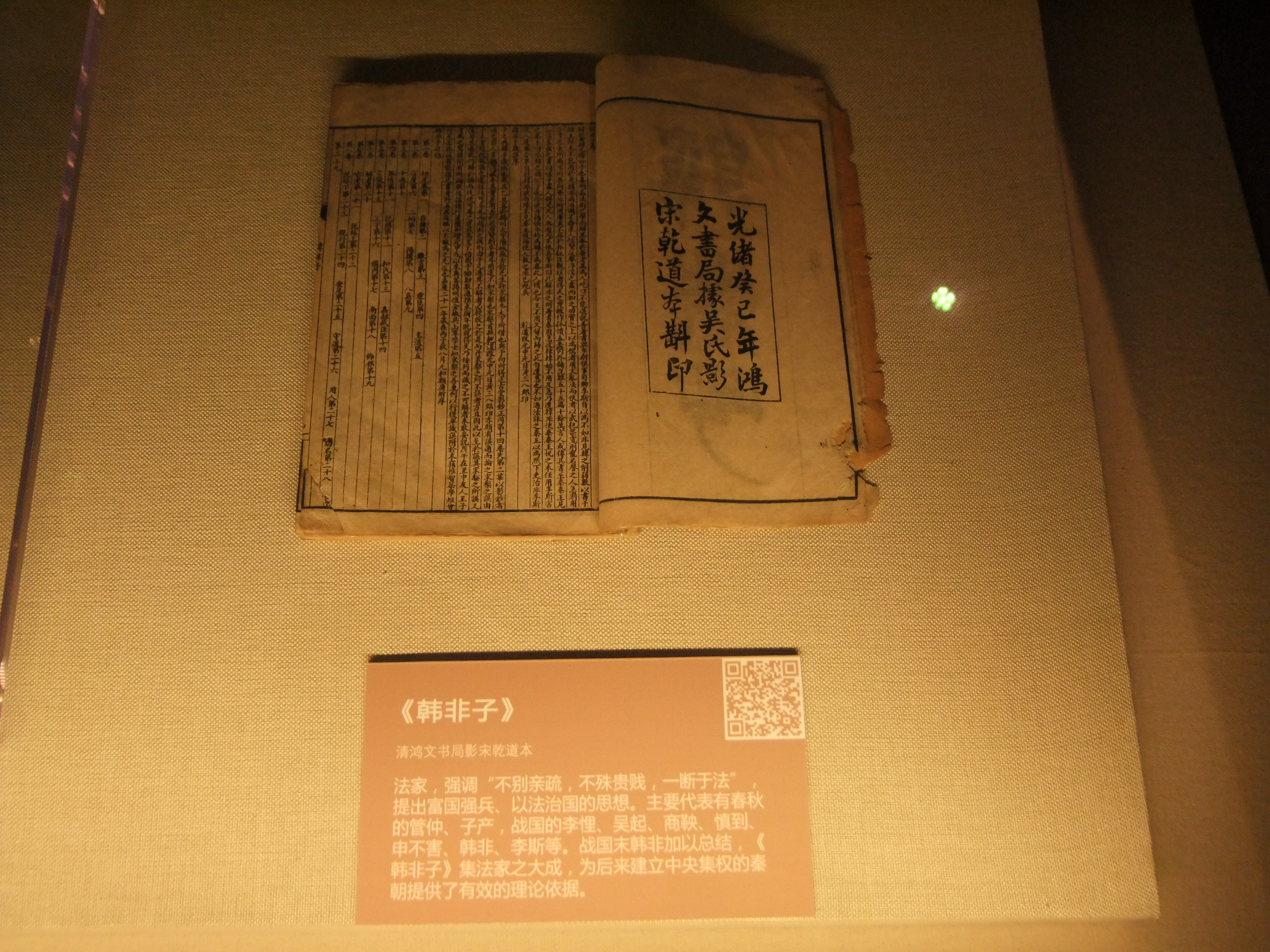
- A late 19th century edition of the Hanfeizi by Hongwen Book Company
- Author: Han Fei
- Original title: 韩非子
- Language: Chinese
- Genre: Chinese classics
- Publication date: 3rd century BCE
- Publication place: China

Han Feizi
- 'Hanfeizi' in seal script (top), Traditional (middle), and Simplified (bottom) forms
- Traditional Chinese: 韓非子
- Simplified Chinese: 韩非子
- Literal meaning: "[The Writings of] Master Han Fei"
Transcriptions
Standard Mandarin
- Hanyu Pinyin: Hán Fēi zǐ
- Bopomofo: ㄏㄢˊ ㄈㄟ ㄗˇ
- Gwoyeu Romatzyh: Harn Feitzyy
- Wade–Giles: Han^{2} Fei^{1} tzŭ^{3}
- IPA: [xǎn féɪ.tsɨ̀]
Yue: Cantonese
- Yale Romanization: Hòhn Fēi-jí
- Jyutping: Hon^{4} Fei^{1}-zi^{2}
- IPA: [hɔn˩ fej˥.tsi˧˥]
Southern Min
- Hokkien POJ: Hân Hui-chú
- Tâi-lô: Hân Hui-tsú
Middle Chinese
- Middle Chinese: ɦan pi.tzí
Old Chinese
- Baxter–Sagart (2014): *[g]ˤar pəj.tsəʔ

The Han Feizi (simplified Chinese: 韩非子; traditional Chinese: 韓非子; pinyin: Hánfēizi; lit. 'Book of Master Han Fei') is an ancient Chinese text attributed to the Legalist political philosopher Han Fei. It comprises a selection of essays in the Legalist tradition, elucidating theories of state power, and synthesizing the methodologies of his predecessors. Its 55 chapters, most of which date to the Warring States period mid-3rd century BCE, are the only such text to survive fully intact. The Han Feizi is believed to contain the first commentaries on the Dao De Jing. Traditionally associated with the Qin dynasty, succeeding emperors and reformers were still influenced by Shen Buhai and the Han Feizi, with Shang Yang's current again coming to prominence in the time of Emperor Wu.

Often considered the "culminating" or "greatest" Legalist texts, Han Fei was dubbed by A. C. Graham amongst as the "great synthesizer" of 'Legalism'". Sun Tzu's The Art of War incorporates both a Daoist philosophy of inaction and impartiality, and a 'Legalist' system of punishment and rewards, recalling Han Fei's use of the concepts of power and technique.

Among the most important philosophical classics in ancient China, it touches on administration, diplomacy, war and economics, and is also valuable for its abundance of anecdotes about pre-Qin China. Though differing considerably in style, the coherency of the essays lend themselves to the possibility that much was written by Han Fei himself, and are generally considered more philosophically engaging than the Book of Lord Shang. Zhuge Liang is said to have attached great importance to the Han Feizi, as well as to Han Fei's predecessor Shen Buhai.

== Title and transmission ==
The Han Feizi was originally simply named the Hanzi (Master Han). The title was expanded to Han Feizi during the Tang dynasty, possibly to avoid confusion with the Confucian poet Han Yu. Not including critical edition commentary, it appears to have always been considered properly the same length of 55 p'ien since the time of its listing in the Hanshu's catalogue. A few sources list it as one p'ien longer, but was likely just copyist error. There are slightly shorter editions, but these did not have serious losses, and went out of print inside China after it was restored to full length.

Two of the text's Laozi commentaries, 20-21, have generally been considered addendums due to "considerable ideological, lexical, and stylistic differences". This says nothing as to the date of their authorship or addition however, with no chapter demonstrating knowledge of Qin unification.

== Introduction ==
Pages from a printed edition of Han Feizi from the Ming dynasty

Han Fei describes an interest-driven human nature together with the political methodologies to work with it in the interest of the state and Sovereign, namely, engaging in passive observation, and the systematic use of fa (法; fǎ; 'law'', ''measurement') to maintain leadership and manage human resources, its use to increase welfare, and its relation with justice.

Rather than rely too much on worthies, who might not be trustworthy, Han Fei binds their programs to systematic reward and penalty (the 'two handles'), fishing the subjects of the state by feeding them with interests. That being done, the ruler minimizes his own input, intending to make no judgement apart from observances of the facts. Like Shang Yang and other fa philosophers, he admonishes the ruler not to abandon fa for any other means, considering it a more practical means for the administration of both a large territory and personnel near at hand.

Han Fei's philosophy proceeds from the regicide of his era. Sinologist Goldin writes: "Most of what appears in the Han Feizi deals with the ruler's relations with his ministers, [who] were regarded as the party most likely, in practice, to cause him harm." Han Fei quotes the Springs and Autumns of Tao Zuo: "'Less than half of all rulers die of illness.' If the ruler of men is unaware of this, disorders will be manifold and unrestrained. Thus it is said: If those who benefit from a lord's death are many, the ruler will be imperiled.".

== Laozi ==
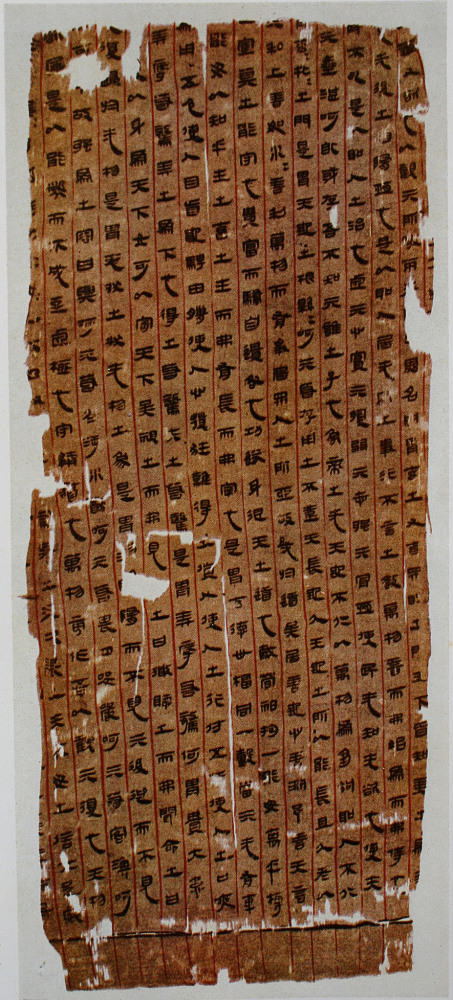
Ink on silk manuscript of the Tao Te Ching – from Mawangdui (2nd century BCE)

The modern version of the Daodejing (Laozi) is thought to have existed by the late Warring States period, even by late estimates, and was popular by that time. Though the Han Feizi's arguments more commonly references past events, it could be expected to reference it. Apart from its later commentaries, it gives a prominent if brief place to Laozi in "core ideological chapters", “The Way of the Sovereign” (Ch.5) and “Extolling Authority” (Ch.8).

An interpretation of the Daodejing as simply cynically political would be flawed. Still, together with qigong, it can be viewed as a manual for politics and military strategy, emphasizing quietude and lack as wu wei. A central concept of later-termed Daoism, together especially with the early Daodejing, Shen Buhai, Han Fei, Zhuangzi, and so-called Huang-Lao Daoism all have wu wei as a governmental function, emphasizing the political usages and advantages of reduced activity as a method of control for survival, social stability, long life, and rule, refraining from action in-order to take advantage of favorable developments in affairs.

Chapter 5 of the Han Feizi focuses on what would today be a later chapter. While not necessarily older "original" versions, the Han Feizi's authors likely read from a more political version, with a different order of chapters. Found in the tomb of a "powerful member of the ruling class", in contrast to its modern representation, the Laozi of the Mawangdui Silk Texts, and two of the three earlier Guodian Chu Slips, place political commentaries, or "ruling the state", first, swapping the two halves of the text as known today. Arguably lacking in metaphysics, associated content instead includes mythologies.

== Late pre-Han dating ==
Sima Qian presents Han Fei as a late Warring states period figure. Because Sima Qian only mentions a few chapters, it is not possible to outright preclude a later Han dynasty origin for the entire work, but it does not mention any Han dynasty events, or avoid any Han dynasty taboos that would prohibit a late Warring States dating. Alongside Zheng Liangshu and Jiang Chongyue, Lundahl's scholarship was notable in collecting and reviewing Chinese scholarship, examining the authorship and dating of the Han Feizi's chapters. His work has still been recalled modernly.

Except as compilations, some chapters would have to be at least as late as the late Warring States period. Chapters 6 and 19 recall the fall of several late Warring states period states. Chapter 6's memorial on Having Regulations recalls the fall of Wey in 243bce. Chapter 19's Taking Measures recalls Qin's conquest of Ye from the Zhao, dated to 236bce. Seemingly written from the context of the late Han state, the chapter could still conceivably have preceded Han's fall in 230bce, or that of either Zhao or Wei if they had yet only ceded territory.

=== Post-Xunzi text ===
Putting aside the traditional claim of Xun Kuang as a teacher of Han Fei, the Han Feizi would arguably still be a post-Xunzi text. The Han Feizi's writing on Shen Buhai likely post-date the Xunzi, with Shen Buhai, Xunzi and then Han Feizi being successively more technically complex.

The Han Feizi is the first preserved reference for writings associated with Shang Yang outside Qin, with the Book of Lord Shang possibly going into broad circulation late in the period. The Han Feizi's writings on Shang Yang come after Xunzi, inasmuch as the Han Feizi is the first known text outside Qin which introduces Shang Yang as a 'philosopher of government'.

The Xunzi references and critiques a variety of figures, including Shen Buhai and Shen Dao. But it only seems familiar Shang Yang as a renowned military leader who strengthened Qin. Though familiar with Shen Dao, what remains of the Zhuangzi is not familiar with a Legalist school either.

=== Laozi commentaries ch.20-21 ===
Using Laozi to illustrate its own ideas similar to other early commentaries like the Xiang'er, the Han Feizi's chapters five or eight are not as academic as later Laozi commentaries in trying to illustrate the Daodejing's actual meaning. Translator W.K. Liao (1939) did consider the Han Feizi's Chapter 20 "Commentaries on Lao Tzŭ's Teachings" academically thorough.

Given differences from the rest of the Han Feizi, Lundahl considered the Commentaries 20-21 addendums written by different authors. But they need not be of later Han dynasty origin. The Han Feizi's Laozi content would have written and added in the same period - one in which the editors thought that rulers would be interested in commentaries on Laozi. Containing the earliest commentaries on the Tao te Ching (Laozi), early Chinese scholarship agreed with a late dating for the Han Feizi's Laozi commentaries Ch.20-21, but was questioned discovery of the Mawangdui silk texts, following Sima Qian's assertion that Han Fei was based in Huang-Lao (Daoism).

Although not necessarily the "original" Daodejing, the Han Feizi is probably generally reading from an early, more political, and less metaphysical version, like that of the Mawangdui. As idealist works, the commentaries can be argued to have earlier ideas. Sinologists Hansen, Tang Junyi and A.C. Graham related the commentaries as developing out of the late Warring States Guanzi ("Seven Standards" chapter), but as including its earlier incorporated Neiye. While it would not suggest they were written by the Han Fei of Sima Qian, Lundalh argued they bare more resemblance to the earlier Mencius than late Warring States Xun Kuang or other parts of the Han Feizi, placing less emphasis on ceremony than the "innermost heart".

== Confucian comparison ==
Some authors of the Han Feizi took a negative view of Confucianism. Chapter 19 for criticizes filial piety as a primary value, since a ruler's mother can still murder him. Yuri Pines believed that the Han Feizi criticized the political limitations of filial piety, but did not believe the Han Fei completely rejected values like filial piety and loyalty, generally accepting their status as primary values.

Chapter 20 goes on to use filial piety and loyalty in its own argument, saying that other people are just not properly investing them. Pairing monarchic and parental authority, it says that dynastic founders who violated them, betraying previous rulers or ceding the throne to worthier candidates, should be censured as detrimental to monarchism. Taken as values "affirmed by all under heaven", while not exclusively Confucian, moral social order and monarchism are based on otherwise Confucian values of "filiality, fraternity, and loyalty" with the addition of compliance.

As compared with the Han Feizi, much of the early Legalist Book of Lord Shang is more focused on state power in relation to the general populace, emphasizing agriculture and war. It only really starts to develop ideas of managing ministers later in the work. A notable example, Chapter 24's "Interdicts and Encouragements", begins to develop ideas on power similar to Shen Dao, but is very late in the work and also of likely later dating than its earlier chapters.

The work has little interest in Confucians as scholars or philosophers. However, at least compared with the Book of Lord Shang's stratocracy, the Han Feizi can arguably be compared more with Confucianism, even if it incorporates reward and punishment. Although its much later administrative mechanisms are more complex, the Han Feizi has a bureaucratic system of names (roles) that can still be compared with the much earlier Confucian rectification of names, and is more focused on forbidding and encouraging ministers, who may well be Confucians themselves.

Although the Han Feizi advocates law, it criticizes Shang Yang in much the same way that the Confucians critique law. Holding that laws cannot practice themselves, it blames Shang Yang for too much reliance on law. Substituting the Confucian argument for virtuous worthies with administrative methods, some originating in Shen Buhai, the Han Feizi says of Shang Yang's Qin state: "Although the laws were rigorously implemented by the officials, the ruler at the apex lacked methods."

=== Spear-shield paradox ===
Chapter 36 is credited as the origin of the Chinese word for contradiction (Chinese: 矛盾; pinyin: máodùn; lit. 'spear-shield'), illustrating the irresistible force paradox:

Among the Chu, there was a man selling shields and spears. He praised the former saying, "My shields are so solid nothing can penetrate them". Then he would praise his spears saying, "My spears are so sharp that among all things there's nothing they can't penetrate". Somebody else said, "If somebody tried to penetrate your shields with your spears, what would happen?" The man could not respond.

Debating with a Confucianist about the legendary Chinese sage rulers Yao and Shun, Han Fei argues that one cannot praise them both because that would be making a "spear–shield" contradiction.

== Wu wei ==
Devoting the entirety of Chapter 14, "How to Love the Ministers", to "persuading the ruler to be ruthless to his ministers", Han Fei's enlightened ruler strikes terror into his ministers by doing nothing (wu wei). Discarding his private reason and morality, he shows no personal feelings. The qualities of a ruler, his "mental power, moral excellence and physical prowess" are not as important as his method of government. Applying Fa (standards) requires no perfection on the part of the ruler.

If the Han Feizi's wu wei was derivative of a proto-Daoism, its Dao nonetheless emphasizes autocracy ("Tao does not identify with anything but itself, the ruler does not identify with the ministers"). Accepting that the Han Feizi applies wu wei specifically to statecraft, professor Xing Lu nonetheless argues that it actually does consider wu wei a virtue, and not just a tool or argument for the ruler to reduce activity and act impartially. The Han Feizi says, "by virtue [de] of resting empty and reposed, he waits for the course of nature to enforce itself."

The Han Feizi includes other commentaries on the Daodejing that would seem to assert that perspective-less knowledge – an absolute point of view – is possible. But scholarship has generally considered them an addendum, given differences with the rest of the work.

== Performance and title (Xing-Ming) ==
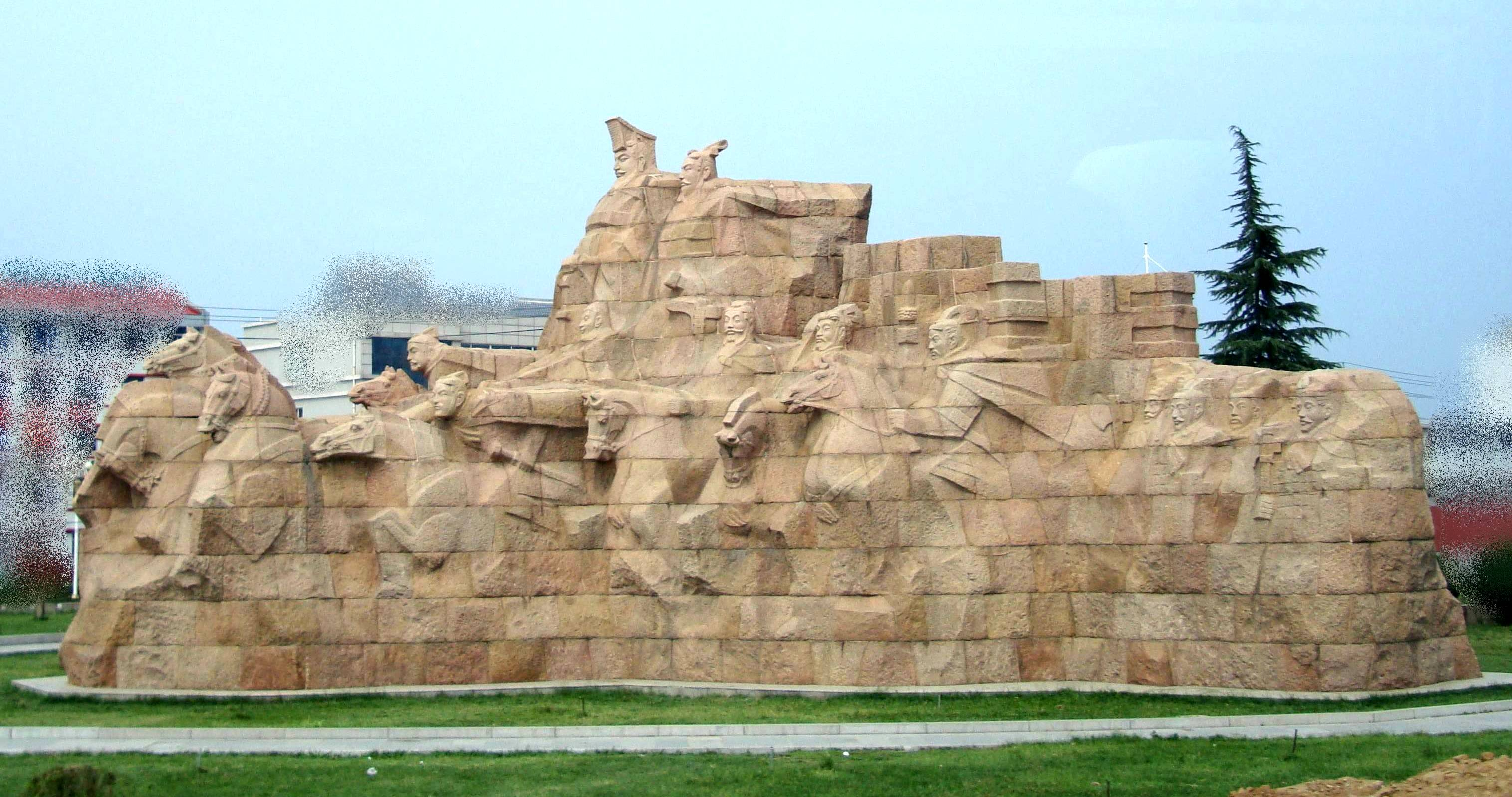
A modern statue of the First Emperor and his attendants on horseback The two August Lords of high antiquity grasped the handles of the Way and so were established in the center. Their spirits mysteriously roamed together with all transformations and thereby pacified the four directions. Huainanzi

Han Fei was notoriously focused on what he termed xing-ming, which Sima Qian and Liu Xiang define as "holding actual outcome accountable to ming (speech)." In line with both the Confucian and Mohist rectification of names, it is relatable to the Confucian tradition in which a promise or undertaking, especially in relation to a government aim, entails punishment or reward, though the tight, centralized control emphasized by the Han Feizi and predecessor Shen Buhai's conflicts with the Confucian idea of the autonomous minister.

Possibly referring to the drafting and imposition of laws and standardized legal terms, xing-ming may originally have meant "punishments and names", but with the emphasis on the latter. It functions through binding declarations (ming), like a legal contract. Verbally committing oneself, a candidate is allotted a job, indebting him to the ruler. "Naming" people to (objectively determined) positions, it rewards or punishes according to the proposed job description and whether the results fit the task entrusted by their word, which a real minister fulfils.

Han Fei insists on the perfect congruence between words and deeds. Fitting the name is more important than results. The completion, achievement, or result of a job is its assumption of a fixed form (xing), which can then be used as a standard against the original claim (ming). A large claim but a small achievement is inappropriate to the original verbal undertaking, while a larger achievement takes credit by overstepping the bounds of office.

Han Fei's 'brilliant ruler' "orders names to name themselves and affairs to settle themselves."

"If the ruler wishes to bring an end to treachery then he examines into the congruence of the congruence of xing (form) and claim (ming). This means to ascertain if words differ from the job. A minister sets forth his words and on the basis of his words the ruler assigns him a job. Then the ruler holds the minister accountable for the achievement which is based solely on his job. If the achievement fits his job, and the job fits his words, then he is rewarded. If the achievement does not fit his jobs and the job does not fit his words, then he will be punished.

Assessing the accountability of his words to his deeds, the ruler attempts to "determine rewards and punishments in accordance with a subject's true merit" (using Fa). It is said that using names (ming) to demand realities (shi) exalts superiors and curbs inferiors, provides a check on the discharge of duties, and naturally results in emphasizing the high position of superiors, compelling subordinates to act in the manner of the latter.

Han Fei considers xing-ming an essential element of autocracy, saying that "In the way of assuming Oneness names are of first importance. When names are put in order, things become settled down; when they go awry, things become unfixed." He emphasizes that through this system, earlier developed by Shen Buhai, uniformity of language could be developed, functions could be strictly defined to prevent conflict and corruption, and objective rules (fa) impervious to divergent interpretation could be established, judged solely by their effectiveness. By narrowing down the options to exactly one, discussions on the "right way of government" could be eliminated. Whatever the situation (shi) brings is the correct Dao.

Though recommending use of Shen Buhai's techniques, Han Fei's xing-ming is both considerably narrower and more specific. The functional dichotomy implied in Han Fei's mechanistic accountability is not readily implied in Shen's, and might be said to be more in line with the later thought of the Han dynasty linguist Xu Gan than that of either Shen Buhai or his supposed teacher Xun Kuang.

=== Ch.5 Way of the Ruler ===
Laozi and Zhuangzi generally lacked or even opposed law because they did not regard words and names as "sufficient to express the Way". Laozi says that "the name that can be named is not the constant name." However, A.C. Graham saw this not as meaning that words are useless, but that they are imperfect descriptors. The work balances inadequacies using opposites.

The Han Feizi's commentaries on Laozi are a critique. For Han Fei, "names" refer to things like ministerial proposals, or "titles", so that Shen Buhai's concept of "names" can critique Laozi, at least for the Han Feizi's purposes. The Han Feizi's chapter 5 Zhudao (道主) or "Way of the Ruler" recalls Laozi in its rhymed style together with Shen Buhai, with an idea of names "rectifying themselves".

As the first sentence of the work, its Jingfa text regards the Dao as generating standards, with arguments more comparable to natural law. Though not included amongst Sima Qian's short list of chapters, he may have considered Han Fei to be "rooted" in Huang-Lao based on Chapter 5's conception of the Way as a standard and hints of metaphysics.

Dao is the beginning of the myriad things, the standard of right and wrong. That being so, the intelligent ruler, by holding to the beginning, knows the source of everything, and, by keeping to the standard, knows the origin of good and evil. By virtue of resting empty and reposed, he waits for the course of nature to enforce itself so that all names will be defined of themselves and all affairs will be settled of themselves. Empty, he knows the essence of fullness: reposed, he becomes the corrector of motion. Who utters a word creates himself a name; who has an affair creates himself a form. Compare forms and names (Xing-Ming) and see if they are identical. Then the ruler will find nothing to worry about as everything is reduced to its reality. Ch5. W. K. Liao.

In "strictly practical" terms, Shen Buhai, Shen Dao or Han Fei might loosely be thought of as originating in a Daoistic 'way in thought' in the sense of governmental models (or standards, fa) "derived from Dao", which Han Fei ultimately supplants with law.

Shen Buhai, Han Fei, and Sima Tan' preferably 'inactive' ruler contracts an assembly of ministers; correlating Ming ("names", or verbal claims) such as job proposals with the Xing "forms", "shapes" or results that they take, Xing results serve as a standard (fa) of comparison for ming claims, forming bureaucratic functions (ming "name" titles or offices) of opposing processes. With early examples in Shen Buhai (Shenzi), several of the Mawangdui silk texts bear resemblance to Han Fei's Chapter 5 discussion of Xing-Ming and its "brilliant (or intelligent) ruler", as do other eclectic Huang-Lao typified works, like the Guanzi, Huainanzi, and Sima Qian's Shiji.

Compared with Laozi, the Han Feizi's "Way of the Ruler" has much less ambiguous language, promoting "the ruler's quiescence", "practical recommendations" and the management of ministers rather than a Daoist way of life or metaphysics. But it "affirms the primacy of the dao", recalling a passage from Laozi with the Way as the origin of the world. It follows recalling Shen Buhai, whose ruler followed the 'natural order' or Way (Dao), responding rather than acting himself, or wu wei.

=== The "Two Handles" ===
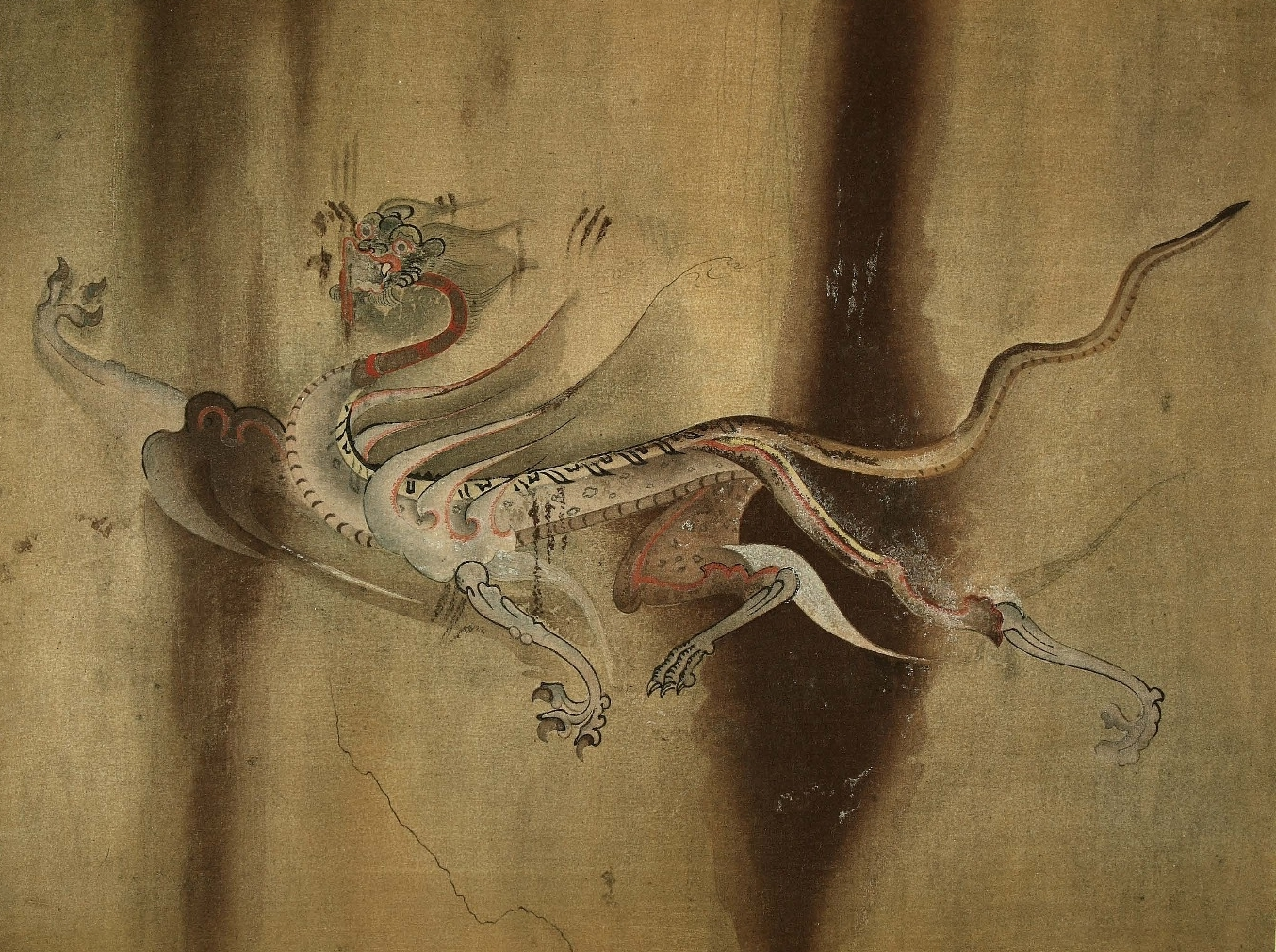
Mythical White Tiger. Qin Shi Huang was called the "Tiger of Qin" Supposing the tiger cast aside its claws and fangs and let the dog use them, the tiger would, in turn, be subjected by the dog. Han Fei Zi

Though not entirely accurately, most Han works identify Shang Yang with penal law. Its discussion of bureaucratic control is simplistic, chiefly advocating punishment and reward. Shang Yang was largely unconcerned with the organization of the bureaucracy apart from this. The use of these "two handles" (punishment and reward) nonetheless forms a primary premise of Han Fei's administrative theory. However, he includes it under his theory of shu (administrative techniques) in connection with xing-ming.

As a matter of illustration, if the "keeper of the hat" lays a robe on the sleeping Emperor, he has to be put to death for overstepping his office, while the "keeper of the robe" has to be put to death for failing to do his duty. The philosophy of the "Two Handles" likens the ruler to the tiger or leopard, which "overpowers other animals by its sharp teeth and claws" (rewards and punishments). Without them he is like any other man; his existence depends upon them. To "avoid any possibility of usurpation by his ministers", power and the "handles of the law" must "not be shared or divided", concentrating them in the ruler exclusively.

In practice, this means that the ruler must be isolated from his ministers. The elevation of ministers endangers the ruler, from whom he must be kept strictly apart. Punishment confirms his sovereignty; law eliminates anyone who oversteps his boundary, regardless of intention. Law "aims at abolishing the selfish element in man and the maintenance of public order", making the people responsible for their actions.

Han Fei's rare appeal, among Legalists, to the use of scholars (law and method specialists) makes him comparable to the Confucians, in that sense. The ruler cannot inspect all officials himself, and must rely on the decentralized (but faithful) application of fa. Contrary to Shen Buhai and his own rhetoric, Han Fei insists that loyal ministers (like Guan Zhong, Shang Yang, and Wu Qi) exist, and upon their elevation with maximum authority. Though Fa-Jia sought to enhance the power of the ruler, this scheme effectively neutralizes him, reducing his role to the maintenance of the system of reward and punishments, determined according to impartial methods and enacted by specialists expected to protect him through their usage thereof. Combining Shen Buhai's methods with Shang Yang's insurance mechanisms, Han Fei's ruler simply employs anyone offering their services.

== Anti-Confucianism ==
While Shen Buhai and Shen Dao's current may not have been hostile to Confucius, Shang Yang and Han Fei emphasize their rejection of past models as unverifiable if not useless ("what was appropriate for the early kings is not appropriate for modern rulers"). Han Fei argued that the age of Li had given way to the age of Fa, with natural order giving way to social order and finally political order. Together with that of Xun Kuang, their sense of human progress and reason guided the Qin dynasty.

Intending his Dao (way of government) to be both objective and publicly projectable, Han Fei argued that disastrous results would occur if the ruler acted on arbitrary, ad-hoc decision making, such as that based on relationships or morality which, as a product of reason, are "particular and fallible". Li, or Confucian customs, and rule by example are also simply too ineffective. The ruler cannot act on a case-by-case basis, and so must establish an overarching system, acting through Fa (administrative methods or standards). Fa is not partial to the noble, does not exclude ministers, and does not discriminate against the common people.

Linking the "public" sphere with justice and objective standards, for Han Fei, the private and public had always opposed each other. Taking after Shang Yang he lists the Confucians among his "five vermins", and calls the Confucian teaching on love and compassion for the people the "stupid teaching" and "muddle-headed chatter", the emphasis on benevolence an "aristocratic and elitist ideal" demanding that "all ordinary people of the time be like Confucius' disciples". Moreover, he dismisses it as impracticable, saying that "In their settled knowledge, the literati are removed from the affairs of the state ... What can the ruler gain from their settled knowledge?", and points out that "Confucianism" is not a unified body of thought.

In opposition to Confucian family sentiment, Tao Jiang (2021) takes Han Fei's analysis of family dynamics as based entirely on the position of the ruler, requiring structural solutions rather than Confucian education or moral cultivation. According to the Liji, an "important early Confucian canon", penal laws should not be applied to high officials. As a major source of political corruption, ministers shielded family members from penal measures in the name of Humaneness and others moral justifications. Only those without connections are subject to the law. Although noting an opposition between politic and morality, Tao Jiang takes Han Fei's opposition in this as clearly pointing to a moral dimension in his vision of political order. In what Tao Jiang takes as one of Han Fei's "most powerful condemnation of the gross injustice suffered by the commoners", Han Fei says:

Judging from the tales handed down from high antiquity and the incidents recorded in the Spring and Autumn Annals, those men who violated the laws, committed treason, and carried out major acts of evil always worked through some eminent and highly placed minister. And yet the laws and regulations are customarily designed to prevent evil among the humble and lowly people, and it is upon them alone that penalties and punishments fall. Hence the common people lose hope and are left with no place to air their grievances. Meanwhile the high ministers band together and work as one man to cloud the vision of the ruler.

== Comparisons and views ==
Apart from the influence of Confucianist Xun Zi, who was his and Li Si's teacher, because of the Han Feizi's commentary on the Daodejing, interpreted as a political text, the Han Feizi has sometimes been included as part of the syncretist Huang-Lao tradition, seeing the Tao as a natural law that everyone and everything was forced to follow, like a force of nature.

Being older than more recent scholarship, translator W. K. Liao (1939) described the world view of the Han Feizi as "purely Taoistic", advocating a "doctrine of inaction" nonetheless followed by an "insistence on the active application of the two handles to government", this being the "difference between Han Fei Tzŭ's ideas and the teachings of the orthodox Taoists (who advocated non-action from start to finish)." Liao compares Han Fei's thought to Shang Yang, "directing his main attention... to the issues between ruler and minister... teaching the ruler how to maintain supremacy and why to weaken the minister."

Phan Ngọc in his foreword to the Han Feizi praised Han Fei as a knowledgeable man with sharp, logical and firm arguments, supported by large amount of practical and realistic evidence. Han Fei's strict methods were appropriate in a context of social decadence. Phan Ngọc claimed that Han Fei's writings has three drawbacks, however: first, his idea of Legalism was unsuited to autocracy because a ruling dynasty will sooner or later deteriorate. Second, due to the inherent limitation of autocratic monarchy system, Han Fei did not manage to provide the solutions for all the issues that he pointed out. Third, Han Fei was wrong to think that human is inherently evil and only seeks fame and profit: there are humans who sacrificed their own profit for the greater good, including Han Fei himself. Trần Ngọc Vương considered the Han Feizi to be superior to Machiavelli's Prince, and claimed that Han Fei's ideology was highly refined for its era.

Although considering the Han Feizi rich and erudite, Sinologist Chad Hansen does not consider Han Fei particularly original, philosophical or ethical" and "more polemical than reasoned", with unjustified assumptions and cynicism recognizable "from all self-described realists", resting on the familiar sneering tone of superior realistic insight."

== Totalitarianism ==
Han Fei has been called totalitarian, but is not very supported in modern scholarship as lacking an ideological basis. The Han Feizi opposes Confucianism and Mohism, or "discourses of the former kings" inasmuch as moralizing discourse could be manipulative. Han Fei says the king should prohibit doctrines he doesn't approve of, or make them official doctrine. If they join the state as teachers of law, it doesn't oppose "in principle" that they could contribute beneficial ideas, codifying their teachings into law rather than texts.

Han Fei's management doesn't require that all programs benefit the state the way he thinks they should. They just have to do what they say they're going to do.

The minister presents his statement; the ruler assigns him tasks according to his statement, and evaluates his merits exclusively according to the task. (Han Feizi 7: 40–41)

Per Sinologist Goldin, Han Fei "might advocate authoritarianism", but is too "nihilist" to offer ideological backing for totalitarianism, not trusting ministers who "claim to be guided by principles beyond reward and punishment." Han Fei sometimes sympathizes on behalf of the people, but generally operates in the name of nothing besides the ruler. Together with what is taken as a concern for justice, Sinologist Tao Jiang posits his "total rejection of any political actors and agents independent of the state" as a basis for totalitarianism.

Han Fei was "adamant that blatant manipulation and subversion of law to the detriment of the state and the ruler should never be tolerated", condemning "gross injustice suffered by the commoners." His solution for aiding the people or saving the state is depriving ministers of power, the same thing he advocates as serving the ruler's interest. Punishing and rewarding the ministers might also benefit the people, who might also benefit from punishment and reward. Virtue and love directed toward them probably will not benefit them.

Those men who violated the laws, committed treason, and carried out major acts of evil always worked through some eminent and highly placed minister. And yet the laws and regulations are customarily designed to prevent evil among the humble and lowly people, and it is upon them alone that penalties and punishments fall. Hence the common people lose hope and are left with no place to air their grievances. Meanwhile the high ministers band together and work as one man to cloud the vision of the ruler.

== Translations ==
- Liao, W. K. (1939). The Complete Works of Han Fei Tzu. London: Arthur Probsthain.
- ——— (1959). The Complete Works of Han Fei Tzu, Volume II. London: Arthur Probsthain.
- Han Fei Tzu: Basic Writings. Translated by Watson, Burton. New York: Columbia University Press. 1964. ISBN 0231086091. LCCN 64013734.

== See also ==
- Bi Fang bird
