= A. C. Graham =

British sinologist (1919–1991)

- Born: 8 July 1919; Penarth, Wales
- Died: 26 March 1991 (aged 71); Nottingham, England
- Spouse: Der Bao Dhang
- Children: Dawn Baker
- Scientific career
- Workplaces: SOAS, University of London

Chinese name
- Traditional Chinese: 葛瑞漢
- Simplified Chinese: 葛瑞汉
Transcriptions
Standard Mandarin
- Hanyu Pinyin: Gé Ruìhàn
- Wade–Giles: Ko^{2} Jui^{4}-han^{4}

Angus Charles Graham, FBA (8 July 1919 – 26 March 1991) was a prominent Welsh scholar of Chinese philosophy, sinologist, and a central figure in the field of Chinese studies in post-war Britain. He was a professor of classical Chinese at the University of London with international acclaim, and a member of the Royal Asiatic Society.

== Personal life and education ==
Graham was born in Penarth, Glamorgan, Wales to Charles Harold and Mabelle Graham, the elder of two children. His father was originally a coal merchant who moved to Malaya to start a rubber plantation, and died in 1928 of malaria. Graham attended Ellesmore College, Shropshire, 1932–1937, and went on to read Theology at Corpus Christi College, Oxford (graduating in 1940). In 1944 he joined the Royal Air Force where he learned Japanese and served as an interpreter in Malaya and Thailand.

In 1946 he enrolled in the School of Oriental and African Studies (SOAS), University of London, where he was forced to learn Chinese due to limitations placed on former military students. He graduated with a B.A. in 1949, before being appointed as a lecturer in Classical Chinese in 1950. He was awarded a Ph.D. in 1953 for his dissertation on the Cheng brothers, later published under the title Two Chinese Philosophers.

In 1955 he married Der Bao Chang, who went by "Judy". Together they had one child, Dawn Graham, born in 1964. He lived in Borehamwood.

== Academic career ==
From his lecturer position at SOAS, Graham was promoted to professor in 1971, a position which he held until his retirement in 1984, at which point he received professor emeritus status. He also held visiting positions at Hong Kong University, Yale University, the University of Michigan, the Society of Humanities at Cornell University, the Institute of East Asian Philosophies in Singapore, National Tsing Hua University in Taiwan, Brown University, and the University of Hawaiʻi. He was elected a fellow of the British Academy in 1981.

Graham has made several important contributions to the translation of Chinese literature, especially in the area of Daoist literature and Tang dynasty poetry (Published in Poems of the Late T'ang). Graham also reconstructed the corrupted logical and scientific chapters of the Mozi. A collection of Graham's scholarly work, papers, library, and archive, was donated to the Royal Asiatic Society in 2018.

== Main publications ==
=== Personal philosophy ===
- Unreason Within Reason: Essays on the Outskirts of Rationality (Open Court, 1992)

=== Sinological & scholarly works ===
- Later Mohist Logic (reprint - Hong Kong: Chinese University Press, 2003)
- Disputers of the Tao: philosophical argument in ancient China (La Salle, Illinois: Open Court, 1989)
  [trans. into Chinese by Zhang Haiyan "Lun dao zhe: Zhongguo gudai zhexue lun bian", Beijing: Zhongguo shehui kexue chubanshe, 2003)
- Divisions in early Mohism reflected in the core chapters of Mo-tzu (Singapore: Institute of East Asian Philosophies, 1985)
- Chuang-tzu: textual notes to a partial translation (London: SOAS, 1982)
- Later Mohist Logic, Ethics and Science (Hong Kong and London, 1978)
- The Nung-Chia 'School of the Tillers' and the Origin of the Peasant Utopianism in China // Bulletin of the School of Oriental and African Studies, University of London, volume 42, number 1, 1978, pages 66–100. Reprinted in Graham A.C. Studies in Early Chinese Philosophy and Philosophical Literature. State University of New York Press, 1986.

=== Translations ===
- Poems of the Late T'ang (Baltimore, Penguin Books, 1965)
- The Book of Lieh-tzu, a new translation (London: John Murray, 1960)
- Poems of the West Lake, translations from the Chinese (London: Wellsweep, 1990)
- Chuang-tzu: The Inner Chapters and other Writings from the Book of Chuang-tzu (London: Unwin Paperbacks, 1986)
- Chuang-tzu: The Inner Chapters (reprint - Indianapolis: Hackett Publishing, 2001)
- The Book of Lieh-tzu (reprint - New York: Columbia University Press, 1990)

=== Festschrift ===
- Having a Word with Angus Graham: At Twenty-Five Years into His Immortality (Edited by Carine Defoort & Roger T. Ames. State University of New York Press, 2018)
