= 6th millennium BC =

Millennium between 6000 BC and 5001 BC

The 6th millennium BC spanned the years 6000 BC to 5001 BC (c. 8 ka to c. 7 ka). It is impossible to precisely date events that happened around the time of this millennium and all dates mentioned here are estimates mostly based on geological and anthropological analysis. The only exceptions are the felling dates for some construction timbers from Neolithic wells in Central Europe.

This millennium is reckoned to mark the end of the global deglaciation, which had followed the Last Glacial Maximum and caused sea levels to rise by some 60 m (200 ft) over a period of about 5,000 years.

== Overview ==
Neolithic culture and technology had spread from the Near East and into Eastern Europe by 6000 BC. Its development in the Far East grew apace and there is increasing evidence through the millennium of its presence in prehistoric Egypt and the Far East. In much of the world, however, including Northern and Western Europe, people still lived in scattered Palaeolithic/Mesolithic hunter-gatherer communities. The world population is believed to have increased sharply, possibly quadrupling, as a result of the Neolithic Revolution. It has been estimated that there were perhaps forty million people worldwide at the end of this millennium, growing to 100 million by the Middle Bronze Age c. 1600 BC.

== Europe ==
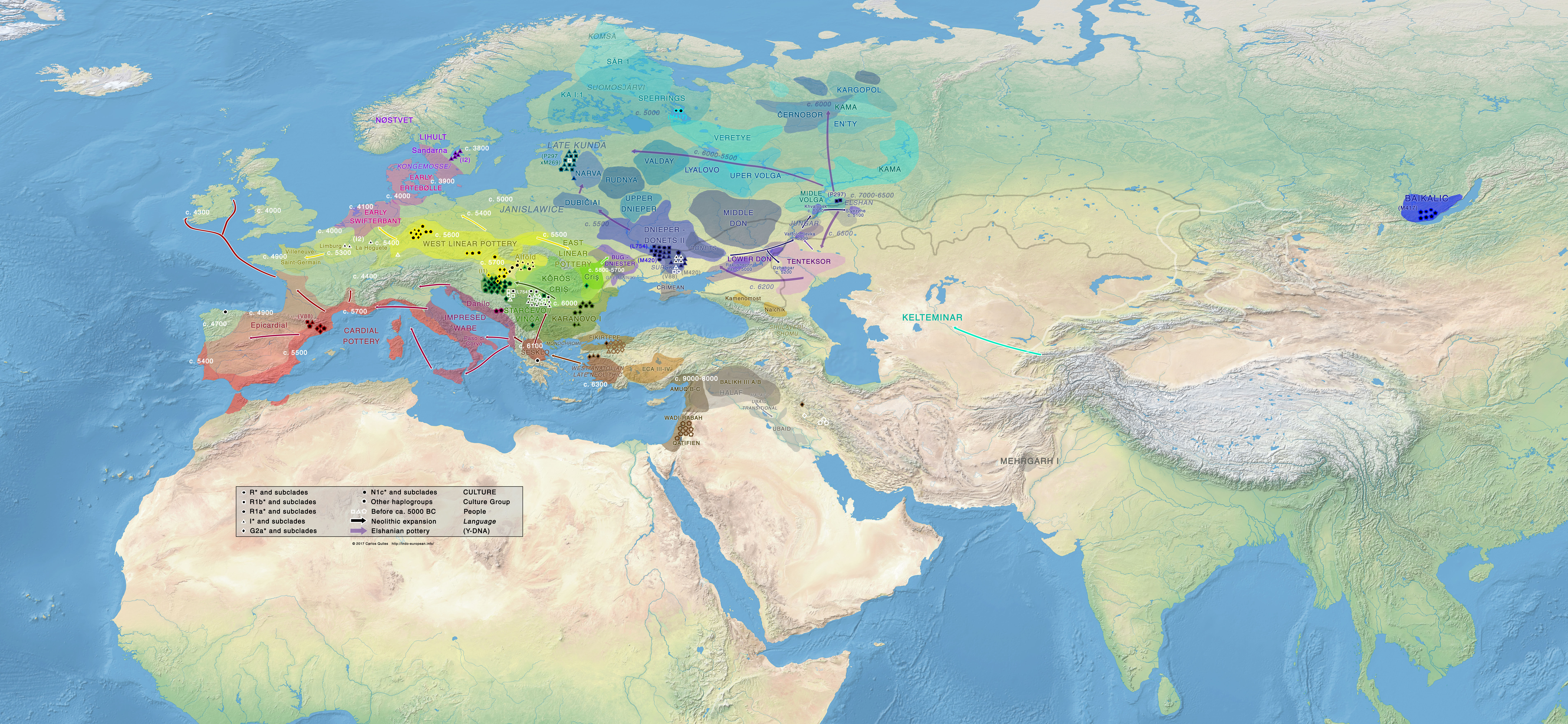
Neolithic migrations in Europe, c. 6500-5000

It has been estimated that humans first settled in Malta c. 5900 BC, arriving across the Mediterranean from both Europe and North Africa.

Use of pottery found near Tbilisi is evidence that grapes were being used for winemaking about 5980 BC.

Evidence of cheese-making in Poland is dated c. 5500 BC.

Four identified cultures starting around 5300 BC were the Dnieper-Donets, the Narva (eastern Baltic), the Ertebølle (Denmark and northern Germany), and the Swifterbant (Low Countries). They were linked by a common pottery style that had spread westward from Asia and is sometimes called "ceramic Mesolithic", distinguishable by a point or knob base and flared rims.

== North Asia ==
According to Vasily Radlov, among the Paleo-Siberian inhabitants of Central Siberia and Southern Siberia were the Yeniseians, of whom the Kets are considered the last remainder. The Yeniseians were followed by the Uralic Samoyeds, who came from the northern Ural region. Proto-Uralic is the unattested reconstructed language ancestral to the modern Uralic language family. The hypothetical language is thought to have been originally spoken in a small area in about 7000–2000 BC, and expanded to give differentiated protolanguages. Some newer research has pushed the "Proto-Uralic homeland" east of the Ural Mountains into Western Siberia.

Polities harbouring the Uralic peoples thrive. The shores of all Siberian lakes, which filled the depressions during the Lacustrine period, abound in remains dating from the Neolithic age. Countless kurgans (tumuli), furnaces, and other archaeological artifacts bear witness to a dense population. Some of the earliest artifacts found in Central Asia derive from Siberia. Large scale constructions occur as early as 6000 BC. Prehistoric settlements in remote Siberia have revealed that 8,000 years ago construction of complex defensive structures, such as the Amnya complex, occurred with political warfare. They are the oldest fortresses in the world. Finding such ancient fortifications challenges previous understanding of early human societies. It suggests that agriculture was not the only driver for people to start building permanent settlements.

Large scale backwards migrations occur with Native American populations migrating back into Asia, settling in areas such as the Altai Mountains several times over a span of thousands of years, earliest dated to 5500 BC. This is potentially linked to the environmental changes at the time, which remained preserved in the oral history of the North American cultures to this day.

Na-Dené-speaking peoples finally entered North America starting around 8000 BCE, reaching the Pacific Northwest by 5000 BCE, and from there migrating along the Pacific Coast and into the interior. Linguists, anthropologists, and archeologists believe their ancestors constituted a separate migration into North America, later than the first Paleo-Indians. They migrated into Alaska and northern Canada, south along the Pacific Coast, into the interior of Canada, and south to the Great Plains and the American Southwest.

Indo-European cultures, descended from Ancient North Eurasians long ago, continue to expand Westwards from Central Russia. It provides linguistic evidence for the geographical location of these languages around that time, agreeing with archeological evidence that Indo-European speakers were present in the Pontic-Caspian steppes by around 4500 BCE (the Kurgan hypothesis) and that Uralic speakers may have been established in the Pit-Comb Ware culture to their north in the fifth millennium BCE.

Such words as those for "hundred", "pig", and "king" have something in common: they represent "cultural vocabulary" as opposed to "basic vocabulary". They are likely to have been acquired along with a novel number system and the domestic pig from Indo-Europeans in the south. Similarly, the Indo-Europeans themselves had acquired such words and cultural items from peoples and cultures to their south or west, including possibly their words for "ox", *gʷou- (compare English cow) and "grain", *bʰars- (compare English barley). In contrast, basic vocabulary – words such as "me", "hand", "water", and "be" – is much less readily borrowed between languages. If Indo-European and Uralic are genetically related, there should be agreements regarding basic vocabulary, with more agreements if they are closely related, fewer if they are less closely related.

Indo-European cultures in Central Asia flourish, these cultures are the: Middle Volga culture (followed by the Samara culture at the turn of the millennium), the contemporary Dnieper–Donets culture. From around 5200 BC, the patriarchal Dnieper-Donets culture leaves the Mesolithic hunter-gatherer lifestyle and begins keeping cattle, sheep and goats. Other domestic animals kept included pigs, horses and dogs.

== South Asia ==
Junglefowl were domesticated around 5500 BC in Southeast Asia.

== East Asia ==
The Zhaobaogou culture in China began c. 5400 BC. It was in the north-eastern part of the country, primarily in the Luan River valley in Inner Mongolia and northern Hebei.

The Yangshao culture (Chinese: 仰韶文化; pinyin: Yǎngsháo wénhuà) was a Neolithic culture that existed extensively along the middle reaches of the Yellow River in China from around the end of this millennium, from 5000 BC to 3000 BC. Excavations found that children were buried in painted pottery jars. Pottery style emerging from the Yangshao culture spread westward to the Majiayao culture, and then further to Xinjiang and Central Asia along a proto-Silk Road.

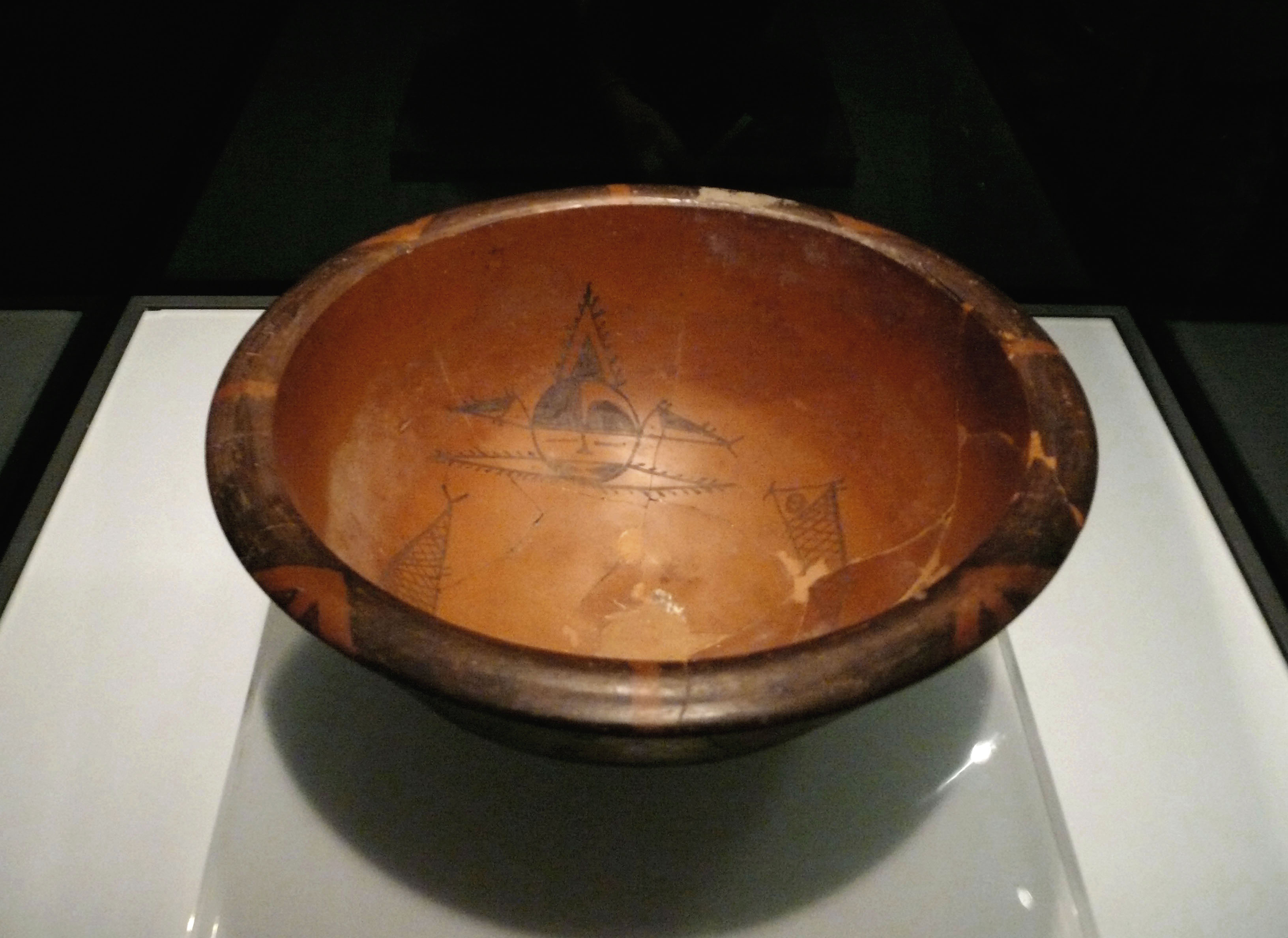
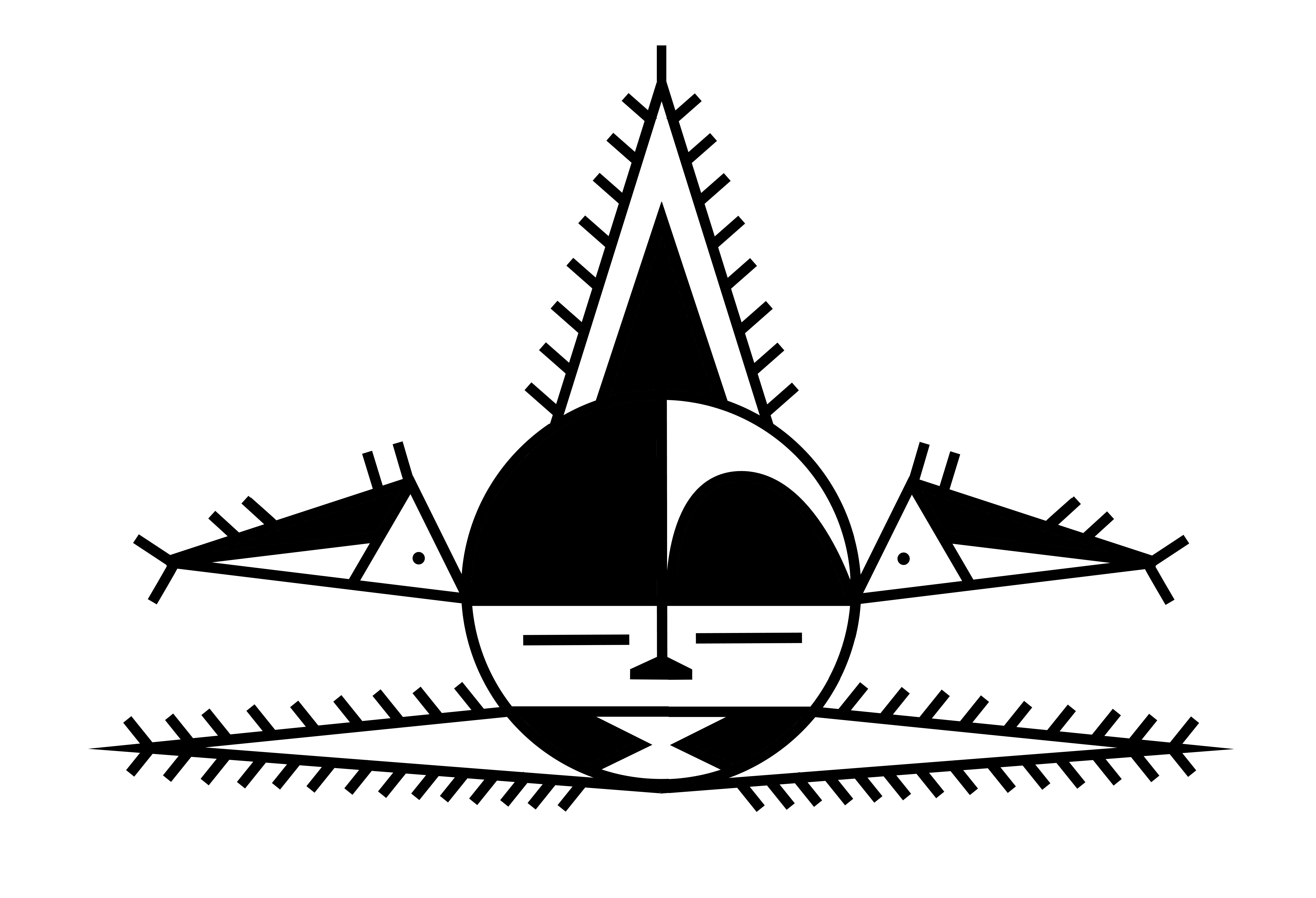
Bowl of the Banpo culture (first stage of the Yangshao culture), with geometrial human face motif and fish, 4500–3500 BC, Shaanxi.

== Oceania ==
Indigenous Australians in what is now southwestern Victoria were farming and smoking eels as a food source and trade good using stone weirs, canals, and woven traps around 6000 BC. An eel trap systems at Lake Condah has been carbon-dated to 6,600 years old.

== Environmental changes ==
The early Holocene sea level rise (EHSLR), which began c. 10,000 BC, tailed off during the 6th millennium BC. Global water levels had risen by about 60 metres due to deglaciation of ice masses since the end of the Last Ice Age. Accelerated rises in sea level rise, called meltwater pulses, occurred three times during the EHSLR. The last one, Meltwater Pulse 1C, which peaked c. 6000 BC, produced a rise of 6.5 metres in only 140 years. It is believed that the cause was a major ice sheet collapse in Antarctica.

Approximately 8,000 years ago (c. 6000 BC), a massive volcanic landslide off Mount Etna, Sicily, caused a megatsunami that devastated the eastern Mediterranean coastline on the continents of Asia, Africa and Europe.

In South America, a large eruption occurred at Cueros de Purulla c. 5870 BC, forming a buoyant cloud and depositing the Cerro Paranilla Ash in the Calchaquí Valleys. A cataclysmic volcanic eruption occurred c. 5700 BC in Oregon when 12,000-foot (3,700 m) high Mount Mazama created Crater Lake as the resulting caldera filled with water. Another major eruption occurred c. 5550 BC on Mount Takahe, Antarctica, possibly creating an ozone hole in the region.

The carbon-14 content in tree rings created c. 5480 BC indicates an abnormal level of solar activity.

== Astronomy and calendars ==
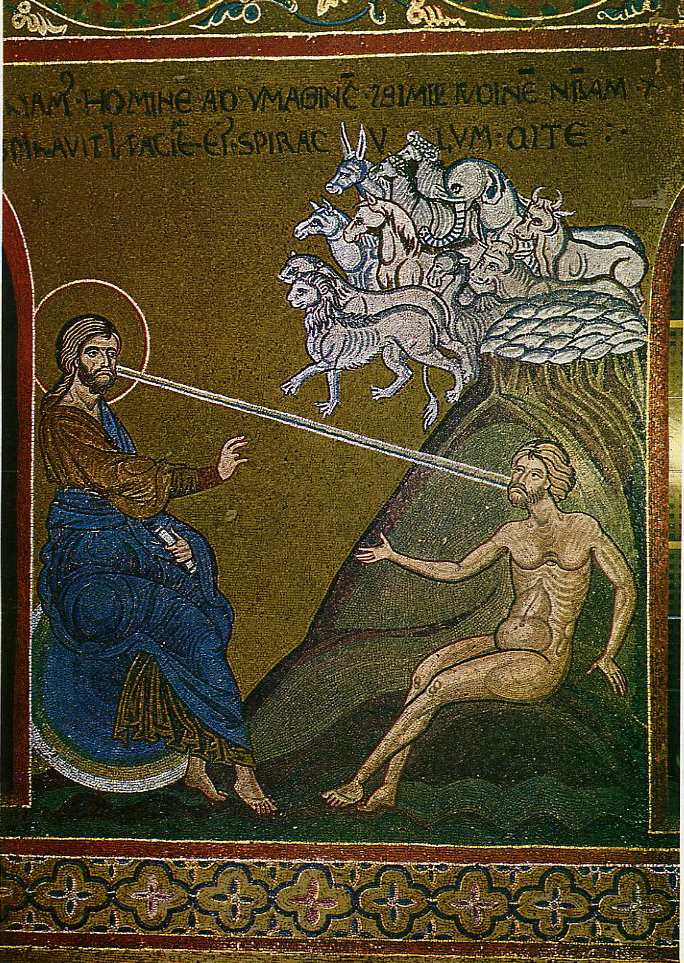
Mosaic of Creation of Adam from Monreale Cathedral - dated year 1 A.M. (September 5509 BC) in the Byzantine calendar.

The epoch of the Byzantine calendar, used in the Byzantine Empire and many Christian Orthodox countries, is equivalent to 1 September 5509 BC on the Julian proleptic calendar (see image).

The 6th millennium BC falls entirely within the Astrological Age of Gemini (c. 6450 BC to c. 4300 BC) according to some astrologers.

According to Gregory of Tours God created the world 5597 years prior to the death of Martin of Tours, which would be 5200 BC.
