= Robin D. S. Yates =

Sinologist (born 1948)

Robin David Sebastian Yates (born 30 July 1948) is a Canadian sinologist.

Yates earned a PhD at Harvard University and held a James McGill Professorship at McGill University. Upon retirement, he was granted emeritus status. Yates is a Fellow of the Royal Society of Canada.

Yates is married to Grace S. Fong.

== Selected books ==
- Barbieri-Low, Anthony J.; Yates, Robin D. S. (2015). Law, State, and Society in Early Imperial China. Brill. ISBN 9789004292833.
- Pines, Yuri; Shelach, Gideon; Von Falkenhausen, Lothar; Yates, Robin D. S., eds. (2013). Birth of an Empire: The State of Qin Revisited. Global, Area, and International Archive. ISBN 9781938169076.
- Yates, Robin D. S. (2009). Women in China from Earliest Times to the Present. Brill. ISBN 9789004176225.
- Yates, Robin D. S. (1997). Five Lost Classics: Tao, Huang-lao, and Yin-yang in Han China. Ballantine Books. ISBN 9780345365385.
- Needham, Joseph; Yates, Robin D. S. (1994). Science and Civilization in China, vol. 5, part 6. Cambridge University.
- Yates, Robin D. S (1988). Washing Silk: The Life and Selected Poetry of Wei Chuang. Harvard University Asia Center. ISBN 9780674947757. JSTOR j.ctt1dnn8wh.
