= Kuei-chen Lin =

Chinese archaeologist

Lin Kuei-chen
- 林圭偵

Academic background
- Education: National Central University (BA); University of Southern California (MS); National Tsing Hua University (MA); University of California, Los Angeles (PhD)
- Thesis: Pottery production and social complexity of the bronze age cultures on the Chengdu Plain, Sichuan, China (2013)
- Doctoral advisor: Lothar von Falkenhausen

Academic work
- Discipline: Archaeology
- Institutions: Academica Sinica, National Taiwan University

Lin Kuei-chen (Chinese: 林圭偵; pinyin: Lín Guīzhēn) is a Taiwanese archaeologist.

== Biography ==
Kuei-chen Lin studied Chinese literature and language as an undergraduate at the National Central University from 1994-1999, and then Computer Science as a postgraduate at the University of Southern California from 2001-2002. She worked as a software engineer for Microtek in 2003. Lin subsequently studied anthropology as a postgraduate at the National Tsing Hua University from 2004-2006. In 2013, Lin received a PhD in archaeology from the University of California, Los Angeles, where she was a doctoral student from 2006-2013. Her doctoral thesis was titled Pottery Production and Social Complexity of the Bronze Age Cultures on the Chengdu Plain, Sichuan, China, and was supervised by Lothar von Falkenhausen and Dwight W. Read.

Lin was a postdoctoral researcher from 2014 to 2015 for the Institute of History and Philology, Academia Sinica. She became an assistant research fellow in 2015, and an associate research fellow in 2023. Since 2016, Lin has been an adjunct assistant professor and later an associate professor at the Department of Anthropology, National Taiwan University. Lin's research concentrates on craft production and its relationships to social complexity during the late Neolithic and early Bronze Age in southwestern China. She worked on the Chengdu Plain Archaeological Survey Report (2005-2010). She did research on the archaeological site of Jinsha. She also conducted archaeological survey concerning the settlement patterns of the Bunun people in Lakulaku River basin, Taiwan.

Lin is the regional representative for Australasia in the Society for East Asian Archaeology. Lin was elected president of the Archaeological Society of Taiwan, constituting the 4th Board of Directors and Supervisors for 2023-2025. Lin has also made an important contribution to the study of 20th-century female Chinese archaeologists.

== Select publications ==
Journal article

- Lin, Kuei-chen, “On craft production and the settlement pattern of the Jinsha site cluster on the Chengdu Plain.” Asian Perspectives 58.2(2019):366-400. (https://doi.org/10.1353/asi.2019.0020).
- Lee, Cheng-Yi, Kuei-Chen Lin*, Zhiqing Zhou, Jian Chen, Xiangyu Liu, Haibing Yuan, Pei-Ling Wang.“Reconstructing subsistence at the Yingpanshan and Gaoshan sites in Sichuan province, China: Insights from isotope analysis on bone samples and charred crop remains.” Archaeometry 62.1(2020):172-186. (https://doi.org/10.1111/arcm.12509).
- Cheng-Yi Lee, Kuei-Chen Lin*, Jian Chen, Andrea Czermak. “Dietary history of two human individuals at the Yingpanshan site, Sichuan Province, revealed by carbon and nitrogen isotope analysis of serial samples of dentinal collagen.” International Journal of Osteoarchaeology, 30.4(2020): 565–574. (https://doi.org/10.1002/oa.2871) .
- Lin, Kuei-chen, Cheng-Yi Lee, Pei-Ling Wang. “A multi-isotope analysis on human and pig tooth enamel from prehistoric Sichuan, China, and its archaeological implications.” Archaeological and Anthropological Sciences 14(8): Article 145(2022). (https://doi.org/10.1007/s12520-022-01576-5).
- Lin, Kuei-chen, Cheng-Yi Lee, Yu Itahashi, Zhiqing Zhou, Jian Chen, Xiangyu Liu, Minoru Yoneda. “Reconstruction of Diets Based on the Δ15N Values of Individual Amino Acids at Three Sites in Sichuan, China.”Archaeometry 65(4)(2023): 908-923. (https://doi.org/10.1111/arcm.12848).
- Wang, Li-Ying, Kuei-chen Lin*, and Zhiqing Zhou. 2024. “Preliminary Insights into the Use of Pottery and Culinary Practices at Guijiabao Site in Southwest China.” Journal of Archaeological Science: Reports 57 (2024): 104598. (https://doi.org/10.1016/j.jasrep.2024.104598)

Book chapter

- Lin, Kuei-chen. 2023. “Archaeology of Community: Changing Settlement Patterns from the Yingpanshan to the Shi'erqiao Period in Ancient Sichuan, China.” In Ritual and Economy in East Asia: Archaeological Perspectives Festschrift in Honor of Lothar Von Falkenhausen's 60th Birthday - Ideas, Debates, and Perspectives', pp. 261–281, edited by Anke Hein, Rowan Flad, and Bryan K. Miller. Los Angeles: Cotsen Institute of Archaeology Press. (https://doi.org/10.2307/jj.4718114.20)
- Hein, Anke, Jade d’Alpoim Guedes, Kuei-chen Lin*, Wa Ye, Mingyu Teng. 2023. “Female Scholars and their Contributions to Chinese Archaeology.” In Women in Archaeology: Intersectionalities in Practice Worldwide, pp. 559–590, edited by Sandra L. López Varela. Switzerland: Springer International Publishing. (https://doi.org/10.1007/978-3-031-27650-7_28)

Book editor

- Flad, Rowan, Joshua Wright, Kuei-chen Lin*, Zhiqing Zhou, and Zhanghua Jiang, eds. Chengdu Plain Archaeological Survey (CPAS): Results from 2005-2010. Los Angeles: Cotsen Institute of Archaeology Press. (Forthcoming).

== Awards ==
- 2023 Academia Sinica Early Career Investigator Research Achievement Award
- 2020-2021 Senior Research Fulbright Grant, Foundation for Scholarly Exchange
