= Rotem Kowner =

Israeli historian and psychologist

Rotem Kowner רותם קובנר
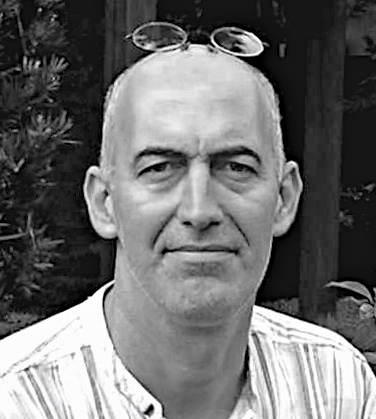
- Professor Rotem Kowner, 2004
- Born: 11 July 1960 (age 66); Mikhmoret, Israel

Academic work
- Main interests: History, especially the Russo-Japanese War
- Notable works: The Impact of the Russo-Japanese War; Race and Racism in Modern East Asia: Western and Eastern Constructions and other books on Russo-Japanese War and Meiji era

Rotem Kowner (Hebrew: רותם קובנר; born 11 July 1960) is an Israeli historian and psychologist specializing in modern Japanese history, the Russo-Japanese War, the history of race and racism in East Asia, and Jewish communities in Asia. He is a full professor in the Department of Asian Studies at the University of Haifa.

== Early life ==
Rotem Kowner was born in Mikhmoret and lived his early years in the Kibbutz of Ma'ayan Tzvi. At the age of three, his family moved to Haifa, where he grew up and went to the Hebrew Reali School. Upon graduation, he entered the Israeli Navy and subsequently served as an officer on a missile boat.

== Academic career ==
After studying East Asian studies and psychology at the Hebrew University of Jerusalem, Kowner spent a year at the Free University of Berlin before pursuing doctoral studies at the University of Tsukuba in Japan, where he earned his Ph.D. He subsequently held postdoctoral fellowships at the Center for East Asian Studies at Stanford University and at the Hebrew University.

In 1998, Kowner joined the University of Haifa as a senior lecturer and was promoted to professor in 2004. He was the main founder of the university's Department of Asian Studies and served as its first head.

Much of Kowner's early scholarship focused on the Russo-Japanese War, examining its military, political and cultural significance, as well as its regional and global repercussions. He organized international conferences to mark the war's centenary, edited several collaborative volumes on the subject, and published numerous books and articles, thereby helping to restore the conflict to a central place in modern historiography.

During the 2010s, Kowner has broadened his research to encompass the history of race and racism in modern East Asia, with particular emphasis on Japan, as well as the history of Jewish communities in Asia.

Kowner has been a visiting professor at Waseda University, the University of Geneva, and LMU Munich. He serves on the editorial boards of numerous academic journals and is a co-founder of both the Israeli Association of Japanese Studies (IAJS) and Israel's biennial Asian Studies conferences. He has also served on the University of Haifa Senate, the Board of Governors, and the university's executive committee, and is director of its Liberal Arts Program.

He is also a member of the executive committee of the Maritime Policy & Strategy Research Center (HMS).

== Works ==
=== Selected books ===
- 1997 – On Ignorance, Respect, and Suspicion: current Japanese attitudes towards Jews. Hebrew University of Jerusalem, Vidal Sassoon International Center for the Study of Antisemitism. ASIN B007HF0B82.
- 2005 – The Forgotten War between Russia and Japan and Its Legacy. Ma'arachot. 539 pp.
- 2006 – Historical Dictionary of the Russo-Japanese War. Scarecrow Press. ISBN 0-8108-4927-5. 640 pp.
- 2007 – The Impact of the Russo-Japanese War. Routledge, UK. ISBN 978-0-415-36824-7. 369 pp.
- 2007 – Rethinking the Russo-Japanese War 1904/05. Brill/Global Oriental. ISBN 978-1-905246-03-8. 539 pp.
- 2008 – Globally Speaking: Motives for Adopting English Vocabulary in Other Languages. Multilingual Matters. ISBN 978-1-84769-051-7. 349 pp.
- 2009 – The A to Z of the Russo-Japanese War. Scarecrow Press. ISBN 978-0-8108-6841-0. 640 pp.
- 2013 – (with Walter Demel) Race and Racism in Modern East Asia: Western and Eastern Constructions. Brill. ISBN 978-90-04-23729-2. 618 pp.
- 2014 – From White to Yellow: The Japanese in European Racial Thought, 1300–1735. McGill Queen's University Press. ISBN 978-0-7735-4455-0. 706 pp.
- 2015 – (with Walter Demel) Race and Racism in Modern East Asia (Vol. II): Interactions, Nationalism, Gender and Lineage. Brill. ISBN 978-9-0042-3741-4. 674 pp.
- 2017 – Historical Dictionary of the Russo-Japanese War, 2nd rev. and expanded edition. Rowman & Littlefield. ISBN 978-1442281837. 898 pp.
- 2019 – (with Guy Bar-Oz, Michal Biran, Meir Shahar, Gideon Shelach). Animals and Human Society in Asia: Historical, Cultural and Ethical Perspectives. Palgrave Macmillan. ISBN 978-3030243654. 466 pp
- 2022 – Tsushima. Oxford University Press. ISBN 978-0198831075. 336 pp
- 2022 – (with Iris Rachamimov) Out of Line, Out of Place: A Global and Local History of World War I Internments. Cornell University Press. ISBN 978-1501765421. 333 pp.
- 2023 – Jewish Communities in Modern Asia: Their Rise, Demise and Resurgence. Cambridge University Press. ISBN 978-1009162586. 446 pp.
- 2023 (with Yoram Evron) Israel-Asia Relations in the Twenty-First Century: The Search for Partners in a Changing World. Routledge. ISBN 978-1032328805. 330 pp.
- 2024 – (with Yoram Evron and P.R. Kumaraswamy) East-West Asia Relations in the Twenty-First Century: From Bilateral to Interregional Relationships. Routledge. ISBN 978-1003326595. 270 pp.
- 2026 – A Hardening Hierarchy: The Japanese in the Global Formation of Racial Ideologies, 1735–1854. McGill-Queen's University Press. ISBN 978- 0228028048. 690 pp.

=== Selected articles ===
- 1998 – "Nicholas II and the Japanese Body: Images and Decision Making on the Eve of the Russo-Japanese War." The Psychohistory Review 26, 211–52.
- 2000 – "Lighter than Yellow, But Not Enough: Western Discourse on the Japanese 'Race', 1854–1904." The Historical Journal 43, 103–31.
- 2000 – "Japan's Enlightened War: Military Conduct and Attitudes to the Enemy during the Russo-Japanese War. In The Japanese and Europe: Images and Perceptions., edited by Bert Edström, 134–51. Japan Library.
- 2001 – "Becoming an Honorary Civilized Nation: The Russo-Japanese War and Western Perceptions of Japan." The Historian 64, 19–38.
- 2004 – "The skin as a metaphor: Early European racial perspectives on Japan, 1548–1853." Ethnohistory 51, 751–78.
- 2011 – An Obscure History – Jews in Indonesia. Inside Indonesia 104.
- 2017 – "When Strategy, Economics, and Racial Ideology Meet: Inter-Axis Connections in Wartime Indian Ocean." Journal of Global History 12, 228–50.
- 2017 – "Race and Racism (in Modern Japan)." In Routledge Handbook of Modern Japanese History, edited by Sven Saaler and Christopher Szpilman, 92–102. Routledge.
- 2022 – "Time to Remember, Time to Forget: The Battle of Tsushima in Japanese Collective Memory since 1905." The Asia-Pacific Journal: Japan Focus 20, issue 12, no. 3. Article 5716.
- 2022 – "The Mir Yeshiva’s Holocaust Experience: Ultra-Orthodox Perspectives on Japanese Wartime Attitudes towards Jewish Refugees." Holocaust and Genocide Studies 36, no. 3, 295–314.
- 2023 – “A Holocaust Paragon of Virtue’s Rise to Fame: The Transnational Commemoration of the Japanese Diplomat Sugihara Chiune and Its Divergent National Motives.” American Historical Review 128, no. 1, 31–63.
- 2024 – “The Puzzle of Rescue and Its Memory: Sugihara Chiune and the 1940 Exodus of Jewish Refugees from Lithuania Redux.” Journal of World History 35, no. 2, 297–332.
- 2025 – “The Russo-Japanese War.” In The Cambridge History of Strategy, 2 vols., edited by Isabelle Duyvesteyn and Beatrice Heuser, vol. II, pp. 122–41. Cambridge: Cambridge University Press.
- 2025 – (with Joshua Fogel and Dylan H. O'Brien). “The Manchurian Savior? Reexamining the “Otpor Incident” in Imperial and Contemporary Japan.” Modern Asian Studies 59, no. 1, 171–206.
