= Ye Wa =

Chinese archaeologist

Ye Wa is an archaeologist specializing in Chinese archaeology. Her work ranges from the Neolithic period to the Tang dynasty with a focus on mortuary practices. She has co-founded the Esherick-Ye Foundation, co-directed the International Field School of Archaeology at the Yangguanzhai field site, and served as a researcher at various institutions.

== Early life ==
Ye Wa (Chinese: 叶娃) was born to a prominent intellectual family in Beijing, China. The beginning of Ye Wa’s undergraduate degree was interrupted by the cultural revolution in 1966. During this period, Ye left Beijing for the countryside and worked various jobs such as farm worker, teacher, factory worker, and factory accountant in Shaanxi, China.

== Education ==
When Ye Wa returned to her education in the late 1970s, she was part of a movement known as the Classes of 1977 and 1978. This movement was important because it signified the return of educational opportunities and an increase in archaeological undergraduate programs and students in China. Ye Wa earned her undergraduate degree in Archaeology from the Northwest University in Xi’an, China. After undergrad, she spent a year working as a research assistant at the Shaanxi Institute of Archaeology. She received a Masters in Archaeology from the University of Oregon in 1987 before returning to the Shaanxi Institute of Archaeology between 1988-1989. She worked on a field site in the Mojave Desert, California from 1990-1997 and a research assistant from 2001-2002 before being awarded her PhD from the University of California Los Angeles in 2005.

== Career ==
Ye Wa’s career has been varied but has focused on traditional academic research as well as making research in China more accessible. Ye Wa was an affiliated researcher at the Cotsen Institute of Archaeology at University of California Los Angeles. She has additionally served as a researcher at the Shaanxi Institute of Archaeology. She has conducted a field school at the Yangguanzhai archaeological site, which was the first international field school in China. She continues to facilitate tours for Wild China, an organization that intends to lead alternative and socially responsible tours of China. She is the Secretary and co-founder of the Esherick-Ye Foundation.

== Esherick-Ye Foundation ==
Ye Wa and Joseph W. Esherick co-founded the Esheric-Ye Foundation in 2016. The foundation was created to support young scholars studying Chinese economic, social, and political history or Chinese archaeology with a grant of up to $6,000. The grant was originally intended to support travel to China but has since expanded to include research for dissertations and other projects in an effort to make on-the-ground research in China more accessible.

== Yangguanzhai Archaeological Project ==
The Yangguanzhai site is a prehistoric village in the Jing River Valley, dated to the mid to late Yangshao period. This site is one of the largest settlements dated to this period and is now a protected archaeological site. The field school associated with the project is one of the first Chinese field schools to bring foreign students to Chinese archaeological field schools. Ye Wa has led excavations at this site since 2010.

== Selected publications ==
=== Books ===
Ye Wa, and Joseph Esherick. Chinese Archives : An Introductory Guide. Berkeley: Institute of East Asian Studies, University of California, Berkeley, Center for Chinese Studies, 1996. Print.

Ye Wa, and Anke Hein. “A Buried Past: Five Thousand Years of (Pre)History on the Jing-Wei Floodplain.” (2020): n. pag. Print.

=== Articles ===
Berger, Elizabeth, Liping Yang, and Wa Ye. “Foot Binding in a Ming Dynasty Cemetery near Xi’an, China.” International Journal of Paleopathology 24 (2019): 79–88.

Berger, Elizabeth, Brunson Katherine, Kaufman Brett, Lee Gyoung-Ah, Liu Xinyi, Sebillaund Pailine, Storozum Michael, Barton Loukas, Eng Jacqueline, Feinman Gary, Flad Rowan, Garvie-Lok Sandra, Hrivnyak Michelle, Lander Brian, Merrett Debora C., and Wa Ye. “Human Adaptation to Holocene Environments: Perspectives and Promise from China.” Journal of Anthropological Archaeology 63 (2021): n. pag.

Berger, Elizabeth, Wa Ye, Yang Liping, and Wang Weilin. “Historical Osteobiographies from Ming-Period China.” Historical Archaeology 59.1 (2025): 145–170.

Tang, Liya, Yang Liping, Wa Ye, Yin Yupeng, Liu Xiaoyuan, Zhao Zhijun, and Wang Weilin. "Exploration of the Medicinal Function of Ancient Herbs: A Study on Charred Plant Remains of Pit h85 in Yangguanzhai Site, Shaanxi Province." Quaternary Sciences 40.2 (2020): 486-498.

Hein, Anke, Wa Ye, and Liping Yang. “Soil, Hands, and Heads: An Ethnoarchaeological Study on Local Preconditions of Pottery Production in the Wei River Valley (Northern China).” Advances in Archaeomaterials 1.1 (2020): 51–104. Web.
