= Falkenhausen =

Falkenhausen may refer to:–

- Ludwig von Falkenhausen (1844–1936), German general, Governor-General of the General Governorate of Belgium (1917–1918)
- Alexander von Falkenhausen (1878–1966), German general, Military Governor of Occupied Belgium (1940–1944), nephew of Ludwig
- Friedrich von Falkenhausen (1869–1946), Regierungspräsident of Potsdam (1914), son of Ludwig
- Gotthard von Falkenhausen (1899–1982), banker, son of Friedrich
- Hans-Joachim von Falkenhausen (1893–1934), German SA-general, brother of Alexander.
- Lothar von Falkenhausen (born 1959), sinologist
