= Banpo =

Archaeological site in Shaanxi, China

- 半坡 (Chinese)
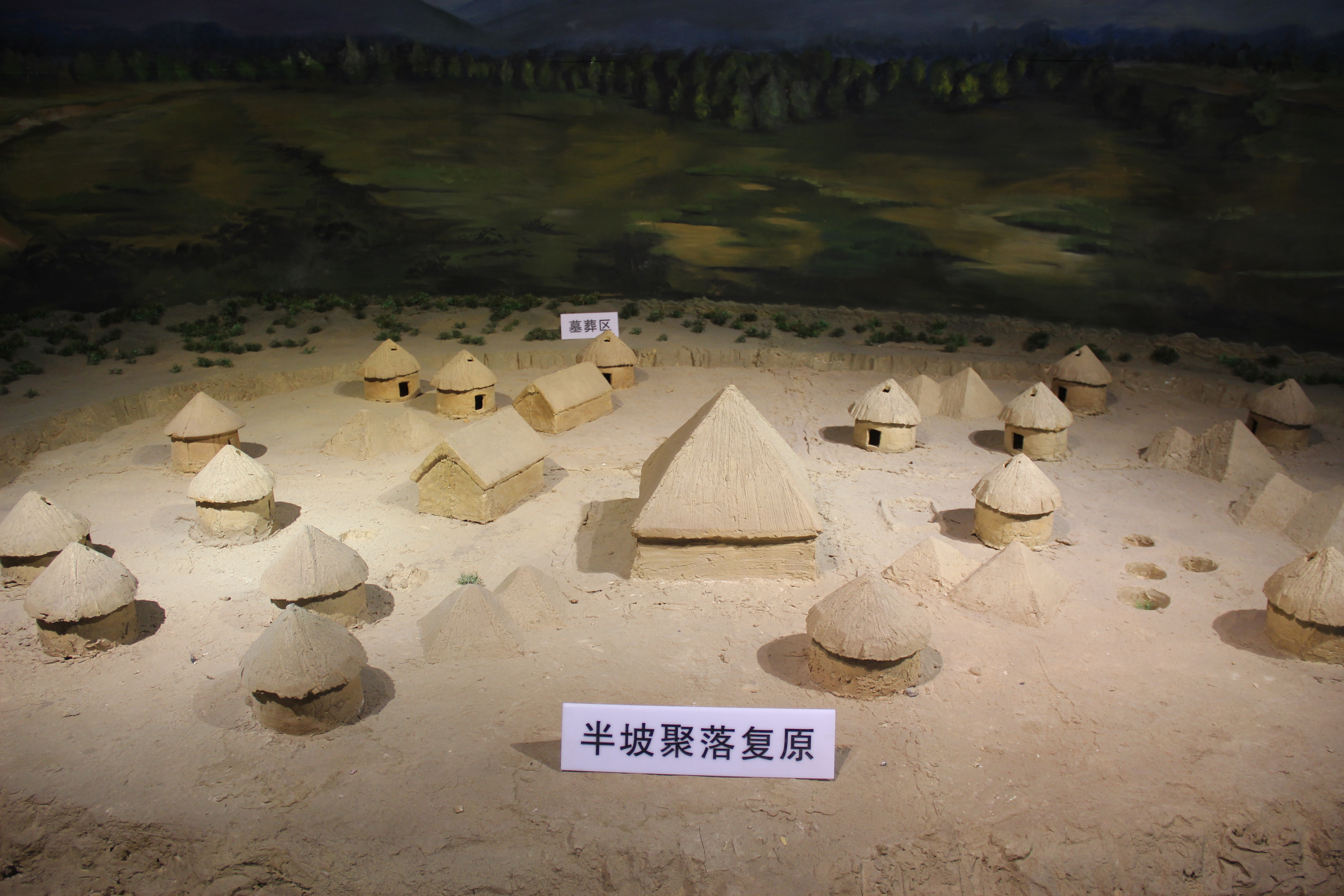
- Reconstructed diorama of a village at Banpo

- Location in China
- 34.273°N 109.051°E
- Type: Settlement
- Periods: Neolithic China
- Cultures: Yangshao culture
- Location: Shaanxi, China

History
- Built: c. 4700 BCE
- Abandoned: c. 3600 BCE

Site notes
- Discovered: 1953 by Shi Xingbang

Banpo is a Neolithic archaeological site located in the Yellow River valley, east of present-day Xi'an, China. Discovered in 1953 by Shi Xingbang, the site represents the first phase of the Yangshao culture (c. 5000 – c. 3000 BCE) and features the remains of several well organized settlements—including Jiangzhai, which has been radiocarbon dated to c. 4700 – c. 3600 BCE). An area of 5 to 6 hectares (12 to 15 acres) was surrounded by a ditch, probably a defensive moat 5 to 6 meters (16 to 20 ft) wide. The houses at Banpo were circular, built of mud and wood on low foundations, with overhanging thatched roofs. There also appear to have been communal burials.

== Site ==
The settlement was surrounded by a moat, with graves and pottery kilns located outside the moat perimeter. Many of the houses were semi-subterranean with the floor typically 1 meter (3 ft) below the ground surface. The houses were supported by timber poles and had steeply pitched thatched roofs. Population estimates for the site typically range between 100-500 people, though estimations are limited because of the large portion of the settlement still unexcavated.

Early Banpo society is generally held to be egalitarian. However, nineteenth-century literature like Friedrich Engels' The Origin of the Family, Private Property and the State, which linked matriarchy to the early phases of developing societies, was introduced into Chinese theoretical thought in the 1930s and applied to Banpo as it was being excavated. Thus, as it favored the Marxist doctrine at the time, the settlement was determined to be matrilineal. Excavators pointed towards gender-segregated collective burials, settlement pattern, and a lavish burial—which they believed belonged to a young girl—as proof for a matrilineal settlement. However, many modern archaeologists have criticized the weakness of these claims, pointing out that one cannot decipher the sex of such a young skeleton as that which was found in the rich burial, and the Marxist paradigm is gradually being phased out in modern Chinese archaeological research. The archaeological evidence to date has not allowed for deeper insight or analysis concerning the religious or political structure of Banpo society.

The site is now home to the Xi'an Banpo Museum, built in 1957 to preserve the archaeological collection.

== Agriculture ==
Banpo is regarded as one of North China's earliest instances of farming, and excavations at the site have uncovered a number of agricultural tools and evidence of both plant and animal cultivation. Of the 6,347 tools excavated at Banpo, 4,271 are believed to be gathering or agricultural tools. Tools found during excavations include hoes, spades, knives, and mortars and pestles, as well as adzes, axes, and digging-stick weights. Many tools, such as adzes and axes, were made of stone, but others like hoes and knives were sometimes made of bone and ceramic instead. Ceramic knives, specifically, were significantly more common than their stone counterparts.

Lack of flotation work during excavations has left a shortage of concrete data. However, theories can potentially be drawn from other early Yangshao sites such as Yuhuazhai, another archaeological site located in Xi'an City near Banpo.

=== Animals ===
The primary animals domesticated and cultivated at Banpo were pigs and dogs. Certain oblong structures located in the village without evidence of hearths are suggested to be the remnants of pigsties or other animal pens. The recovery of dog skeletons near food remains have led to speculation that dogs were raised for consumption, however lack of data regarding butchering or cutting marks on the bones prevents a definitive answer. A select few horse remains have also been discovered at the Banpo site.

Aside from pigs and dogs, the people of Banpo also cultivated sheep, cattle, and goats to some extent. Evidence for sheep in faunal assemblage dates back to roughly 4,900-3,800 BCE, though information is inconclusive on whether they were domesticated.

Recovered deer bones are evidence that hunting contributed to Banpo diets, and fishing is also believed to have been a source of food. Evidence for fishing includes bone fishhooks and net-sinkers. There is some debate regarding the extent to which fishing was a part of Banpo society, though, as only 5.5% of the over 6,000 tools discovered were confirmed fishing tools. Popular understandings of Banpo assume a strong fishing culture in the village due to the extensive presence of fish in the recovered pottery art, as well as depictions of fish nets.

=== Plants ===
In terms of plant cultivation, carbonized millet remains were found inside pottery artifacts, leading researchers to conclude that agriculture, especially the cultivation of millet, were an integral part of Banpo's sustenance. While limited flotation work has been conducted at the Banpo site, research done at the nearby site of Yuhuazhai, nearly identical to Banpo in culture and form, produced a 9:10 ratio of millet in discovered crop remains and has been used to assume ideas about Banpo's agricultural sources.

Millet agriculture at the Banpo site is also supported by environmental reconstruction suggesting a dry climate suitable for millet farming. The millet remains uncovered in Banpo were specifically foxtail millet, which appears to have overtaken broomcorn millet in the Loess Plateau around 5500 BP. Other plant remains uncovered included hazelnuts, chestnuts, pine nuts, and hackberry seeds. Hemp was likely cultivated for medicinal purposes.

Cabbage remains were also discovered at Banpo, however, debates over the validity of these claims arise from misconstrued information on the findings. A 1963 Banpo site report cited by many as support for the presence of cabbage seeds has been unfortunately misinterpreted. The original report confirms the discovery of general vegetable seeds but does not specify cabbage seeds. Other sources seem to confirm that cabbage seeds were, in fact, uncovered. One such discovery by Chen Wenhua of carbonized remains in a pottery container were first believed to be cabbage seeds but were later identified as mustard seeds. Kateřina Šamajová argued in 2023 that the misinterpretation of past reports, limited findings of cabbage remains, and linguistic inconsistencies suggest that cabbage was not an established part of agriculture in Neolithic China.

== Banpo culture ==
Banpo is the type site of the Banpo culture, first phase of the Yangshao Culture. Archaeological sites with similarities to the site at Banpo are considered to be part of the "Banpo phase" (4th-3rd millennium BCE) of the Yangshao culture. Banpo was excavated from 1954 to 1957 and was the first Yangshao culture site to undergo large-scale excavation.

=== Burial traditions ===
In total, 174 adult burials and 73 child burials have been excavated at Banpo. Deceased infants and small children were placed in large redware pottery jars and buried near the settlement. Adults had a distinct cemetery on the northern outskirts of the site and, with a few exceptions, were buried laying flat in individual, 2 meter deep pits, often interred with pottery.

One of the most lavish burials was a child, who was buried in a wooden tomb with pottery, bone and green jade jewelry, and three stone pellets. These stone balls are considered to be one of the earliest examples of children's toys. In addition, the opulence suggests the presence of social stratification at the time of the burial, which was in the late Banpo phase.

=== Pottery ===
The Banpo site is characterized by its abundance of pottery. Over 500,000 pieces of ceramic potsherds have been recovered from the Banpo site, and almost 1,000 vessels have been reassembled. Since the site was stationed on terraces rich with loess, fine-grained clay materials were present in high amounts, supplying the materials necessary for such a high output of pottery.

Restored vessels were divided into one of four categories: serving receptacles, water containers, cooking utensils, and storage vessels. However, debate over the specific uses of Banpo amphorae has persisted for decades, and many explanations have been offered, such as employment as water-drawing jars, ritual vessels, and fermentation or storage for alcohol. Though a purpose relating to water-drawing is most generally accepted, the practical applications of this function are highly contested, and research completed on Banpo and Jiangzhai amphorae has found residue promoting beer-brewing as a major function of early Yangshao ceramic vessels. Carbon residue on some sherds has also supported the usage of some pottery as cookware.

==== Pottery innovations ====
Banpo was the first culture to use the potter's wheel in China, while other cultures continued to use coiling techniques, and the potter's wheel only became generalized by the end of the Yangshao period. Banpo also had the first pottery kilns in China. The designs of the Banpo were often geometric, and animal or anthropomorphic figures.

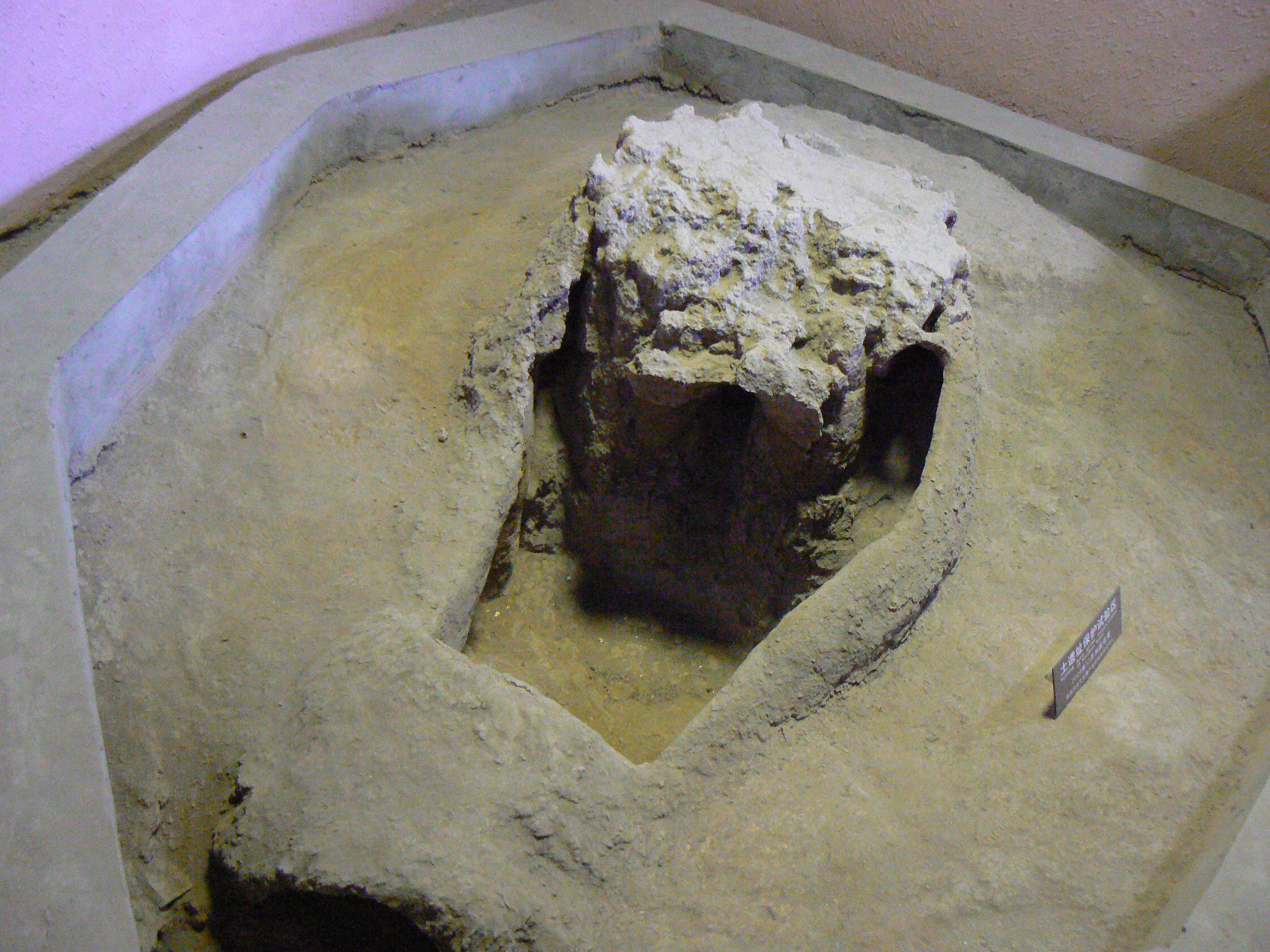
Banpo pottery kiln

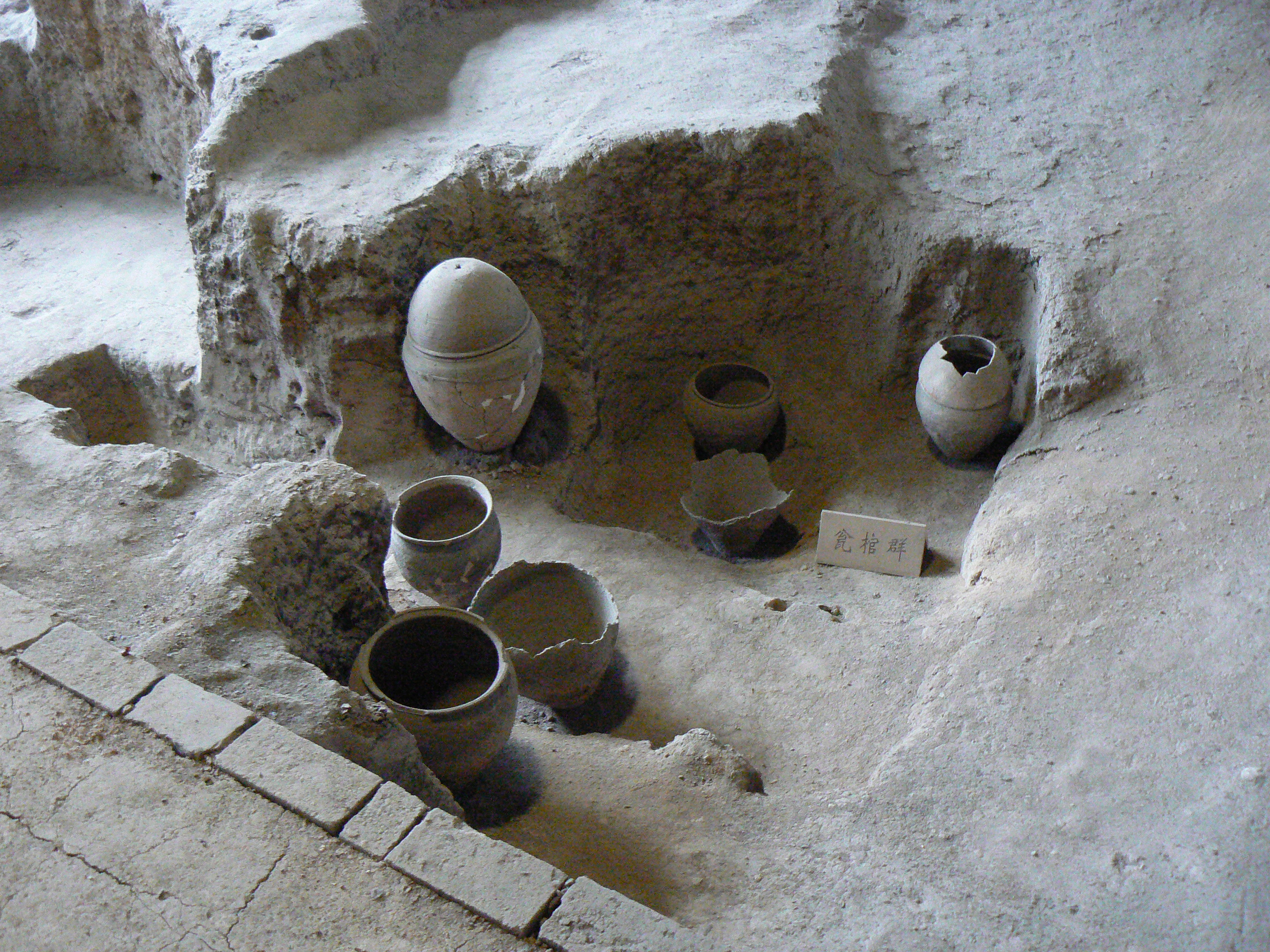
Banpo pottery made on a potter's wheel

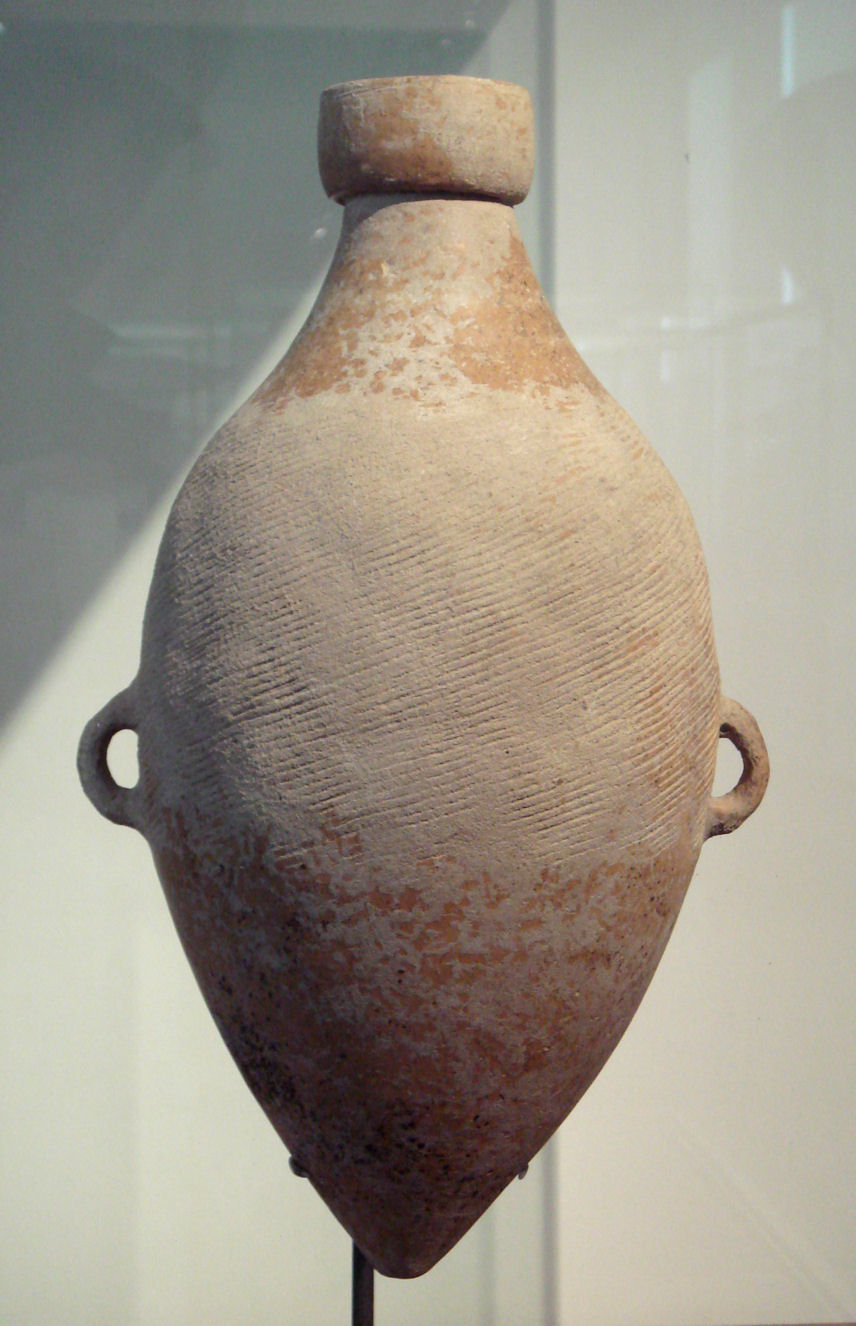
Yangshao traditional cordmarked amphora (Banpo phase, 4800 BC, Shaanxi

==== Designs ====
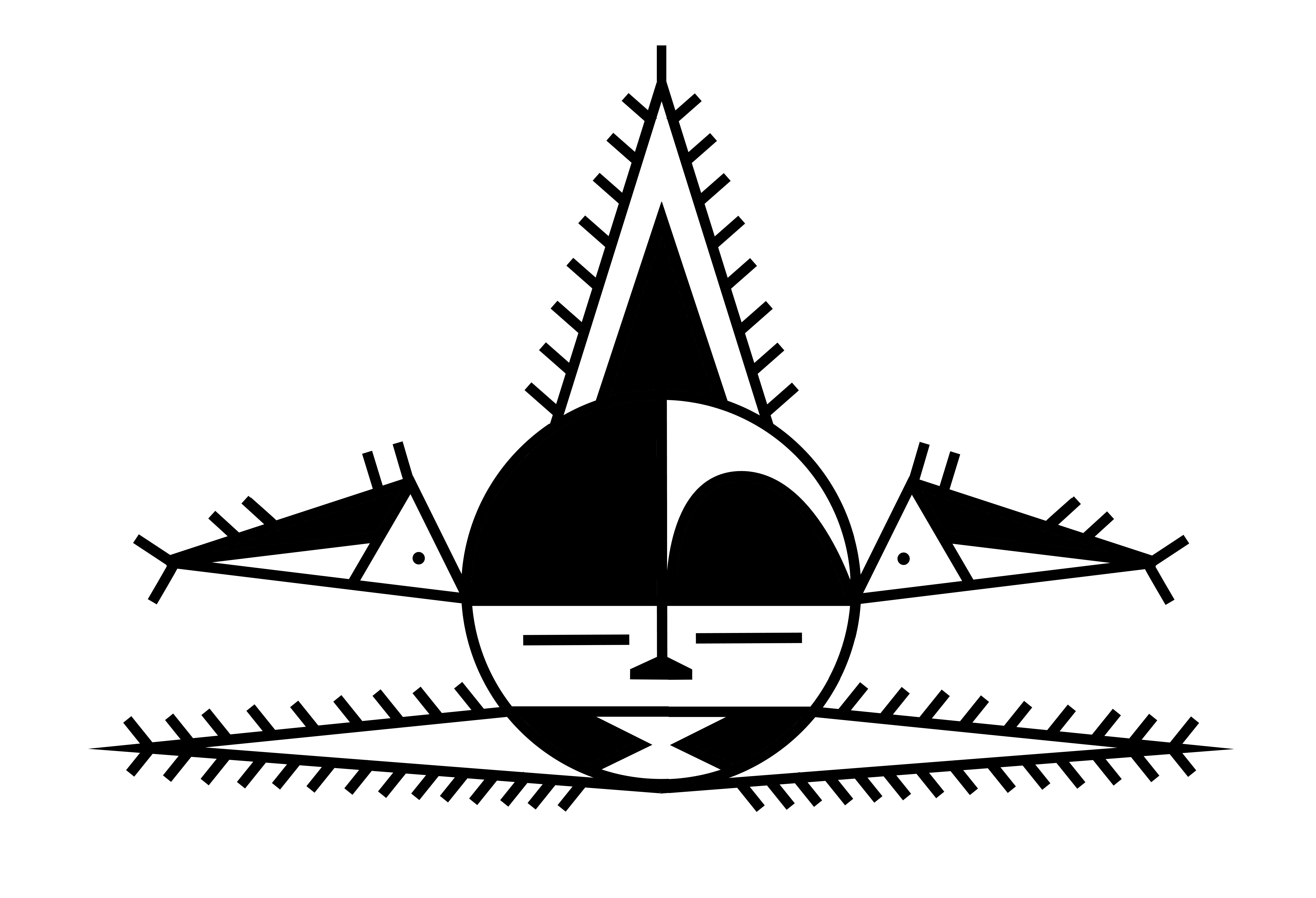
Banpo anthropomorphic motif

Banpo decorative pottery, usually in the form of clay bowls or basins with rolled lips, is typically distinguished by a red exterior and black, geometrical drawings on the interior or exterior of the ceramic. Similarities have been noted between the motifs of the Afanasievo culture and Okunev culture of the Minusinsk basin in Siberia, and those on the potteries of Banpo. Pottery style emerging from the Yangshao culture spread westward to the Majiayao culture, and then further to Xinjiang and Central Asia.

Fish patterns are the most common design, with two notable types: "single" fish and "complex" fish, the latter of which is a connected chain of two or more fish. The complex fish gained popularity over time as designs became more abstract and geometrical. Another prevalent motif are human heads, pronounced by triangles and seen often in tandem with the fish. Though there are many theories, no definite explanations for this anthropomorphic design exist, thought most conjectures cite the importance of fish to the Banpo people and culture, subsisting them and perhaps representing prosperity, life, and fertility.

Though more ceramics were red with black decoration, there were also some white and red designs, as well as, most rarely, vessels with red exteriors and gray interiors. Research by Xinyuan Su on the "inner-outer stratification" of Banpo's ceramic-making, where the exterior of a given ceramic piece is a different hue from the interior, posits that the red exterior of Banpo pottery was not caused by traditional masking techniques, but was rather the result of firing techniques which would have exposed the ceramic to various oxygen levels and therefore varied iron oxidation. Firing temperature was typically around 1010 °C, or 1850 °F, and various methods were employed, including buried, enclosed, and stacked firing.

The typical black pigment used for designs on Banpo pottery was derived from pyrolusite; the red designs came from hematite, cinnabar, and ocher; the white designs came from calcite. Several of the potteries have symbol marks, and are part of the Neolithic signs in China, but each sign occurs singly, which is antinomic with the function of a written script. They could instead be the personal mark of individual potters.

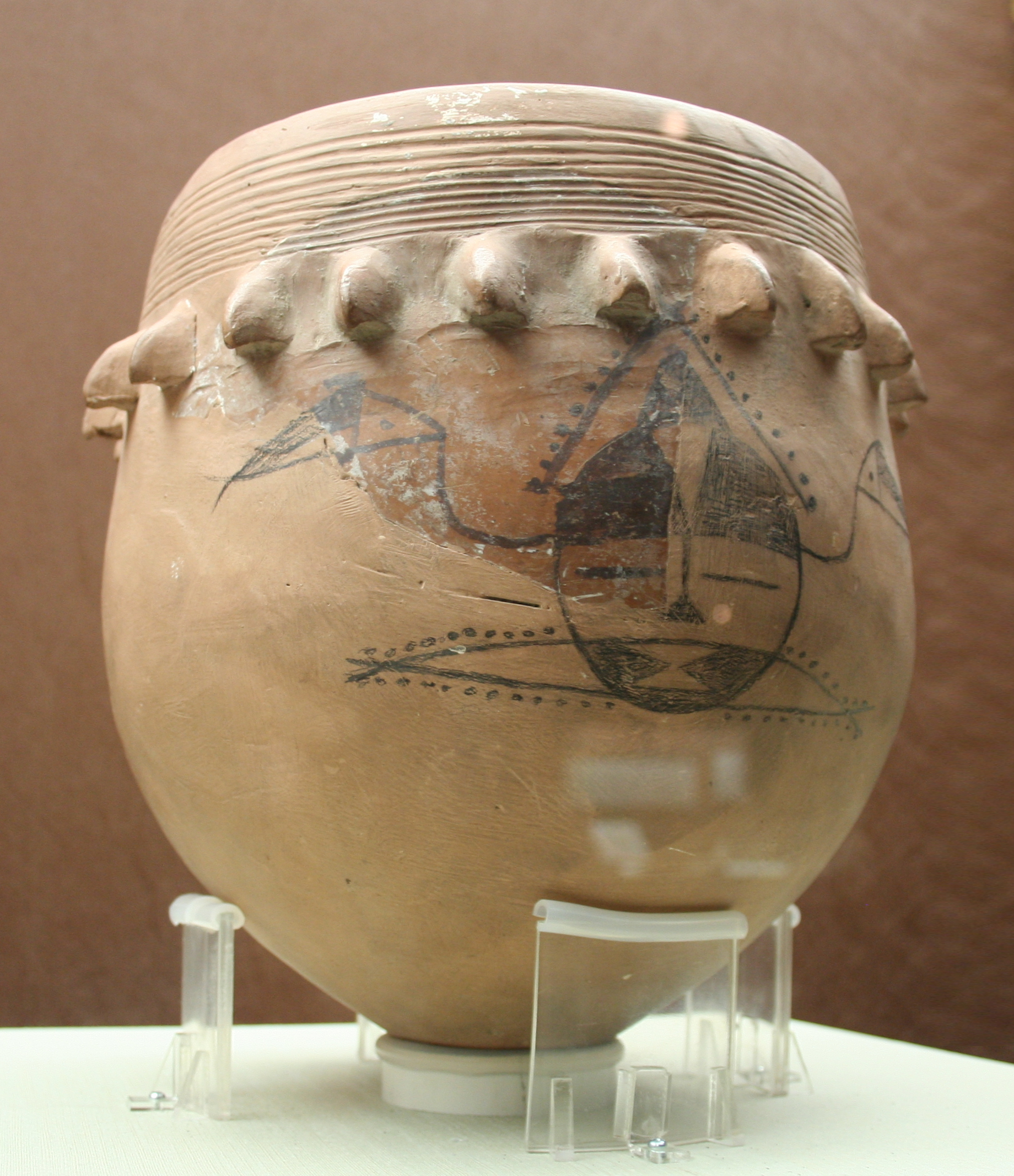
Pottery pot with human and fish design, Shaanxi province. Beijing Capital Museum

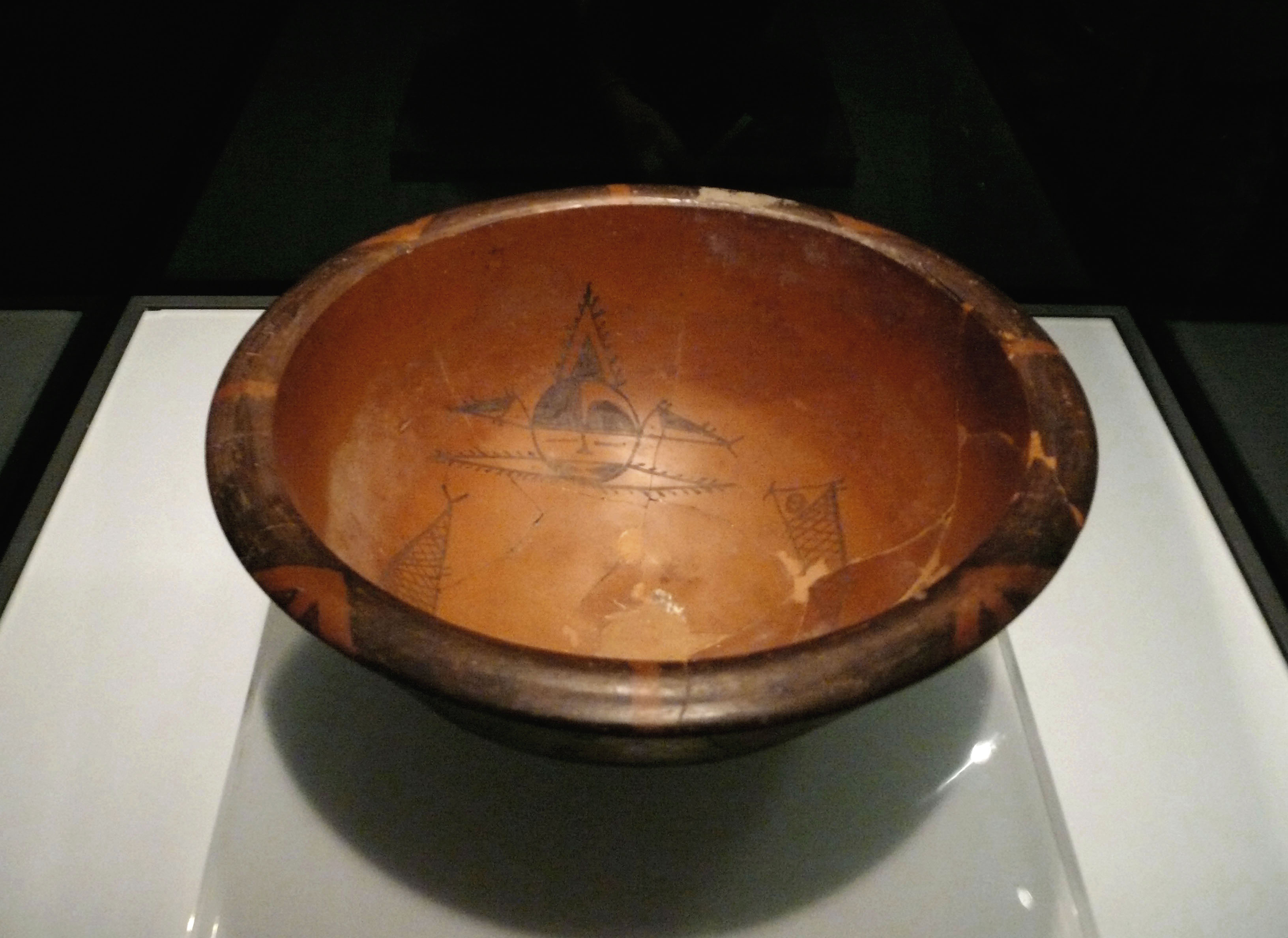
Human faced–fish decorated bowl recovered at Banpo.

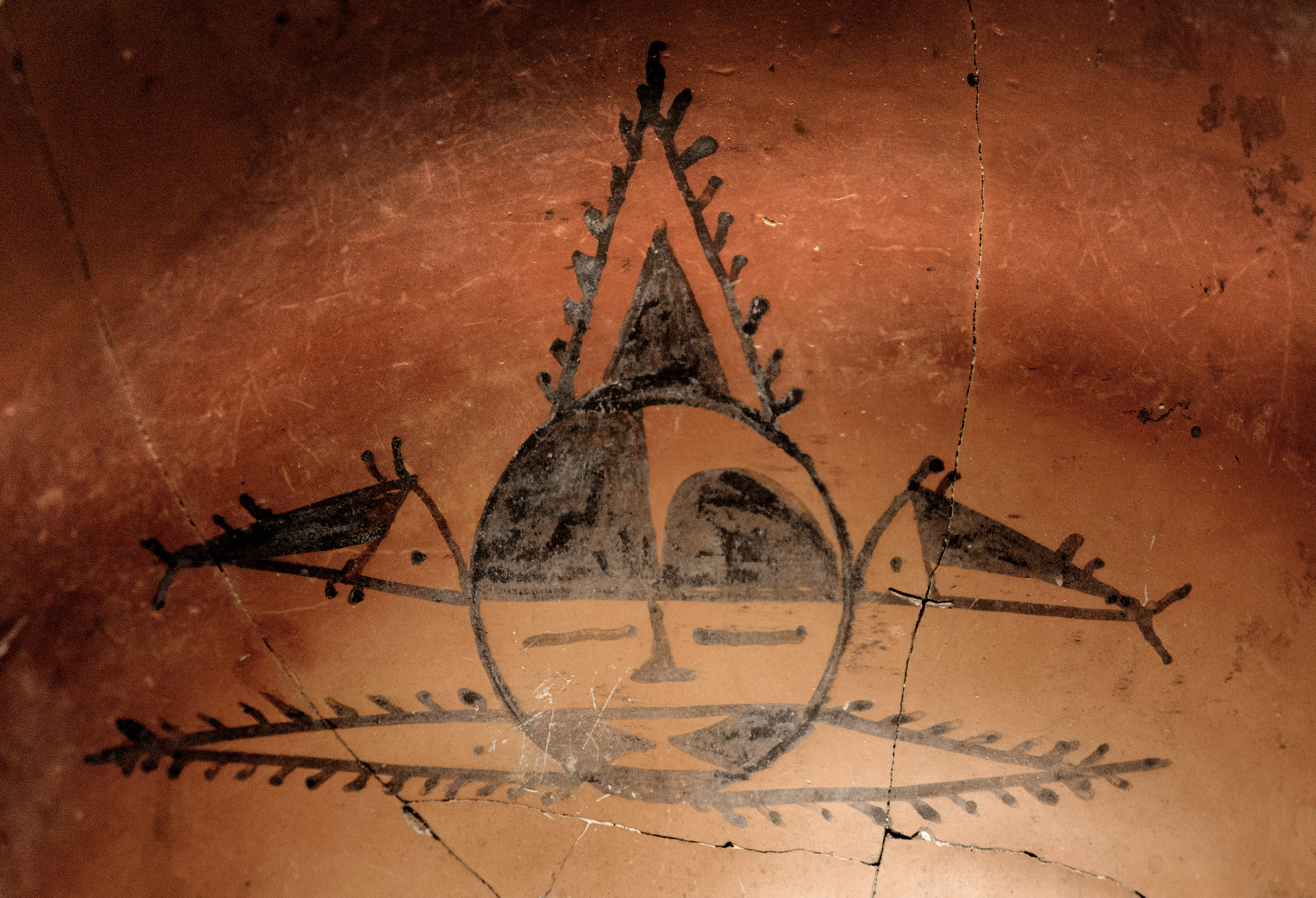
Banpo anthropomorphic motif

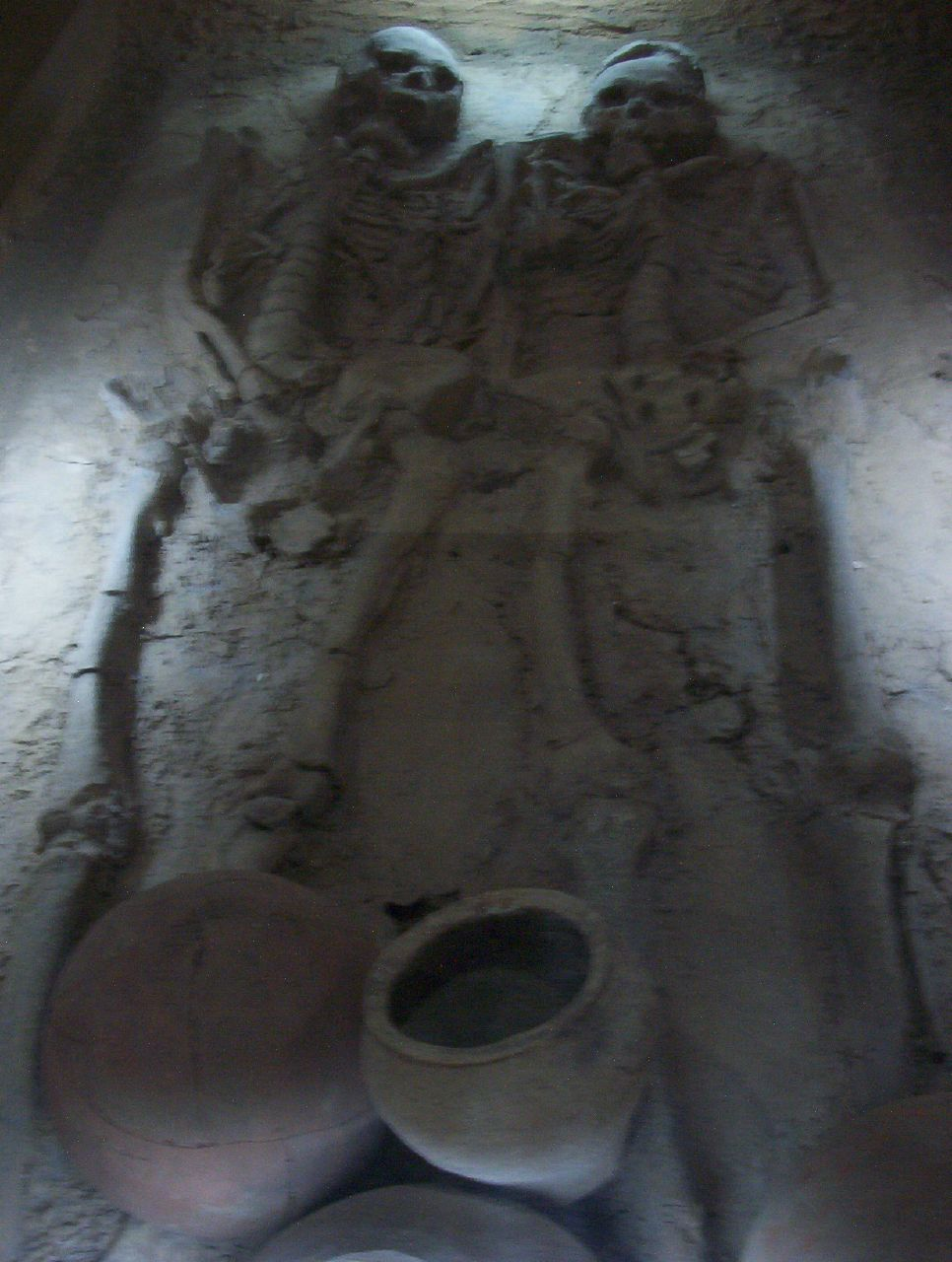
Banpo burial

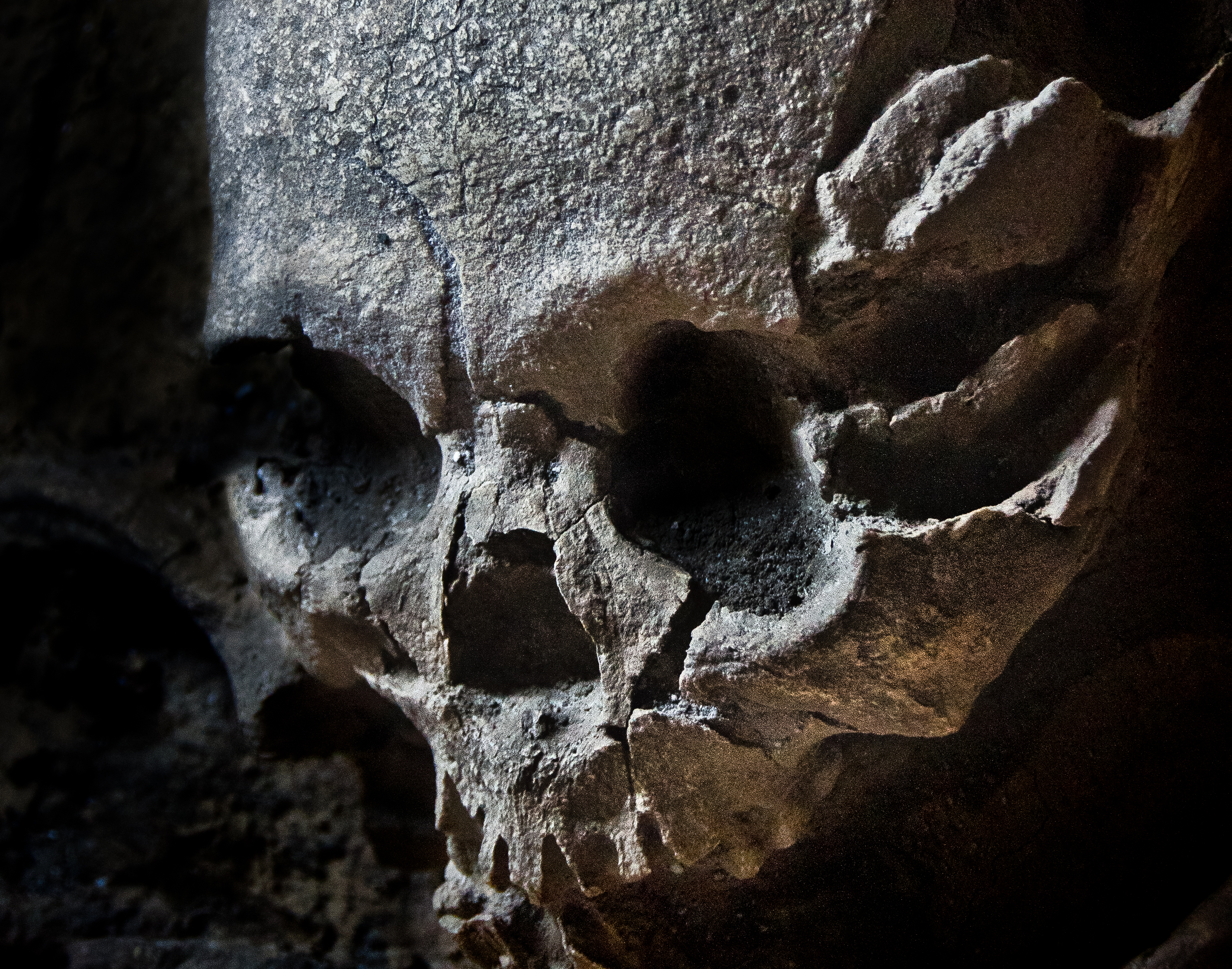
A skull recovered at Banpo displayed at the Xi'an Banpo Museum.

Banpo pottery symbols (c.4700-3600 BC)

== See also ==
- Banpo symbols
- Sanxingdui
- Cishan culture
- Nanzhuangtou
- Jiangzhai
- Yangguanzhai
