= Banpo Museum =

Archaeological museum in Xi'an, Shaanxi, China

Coordinates: 34°16′24″N 109°03′04″E

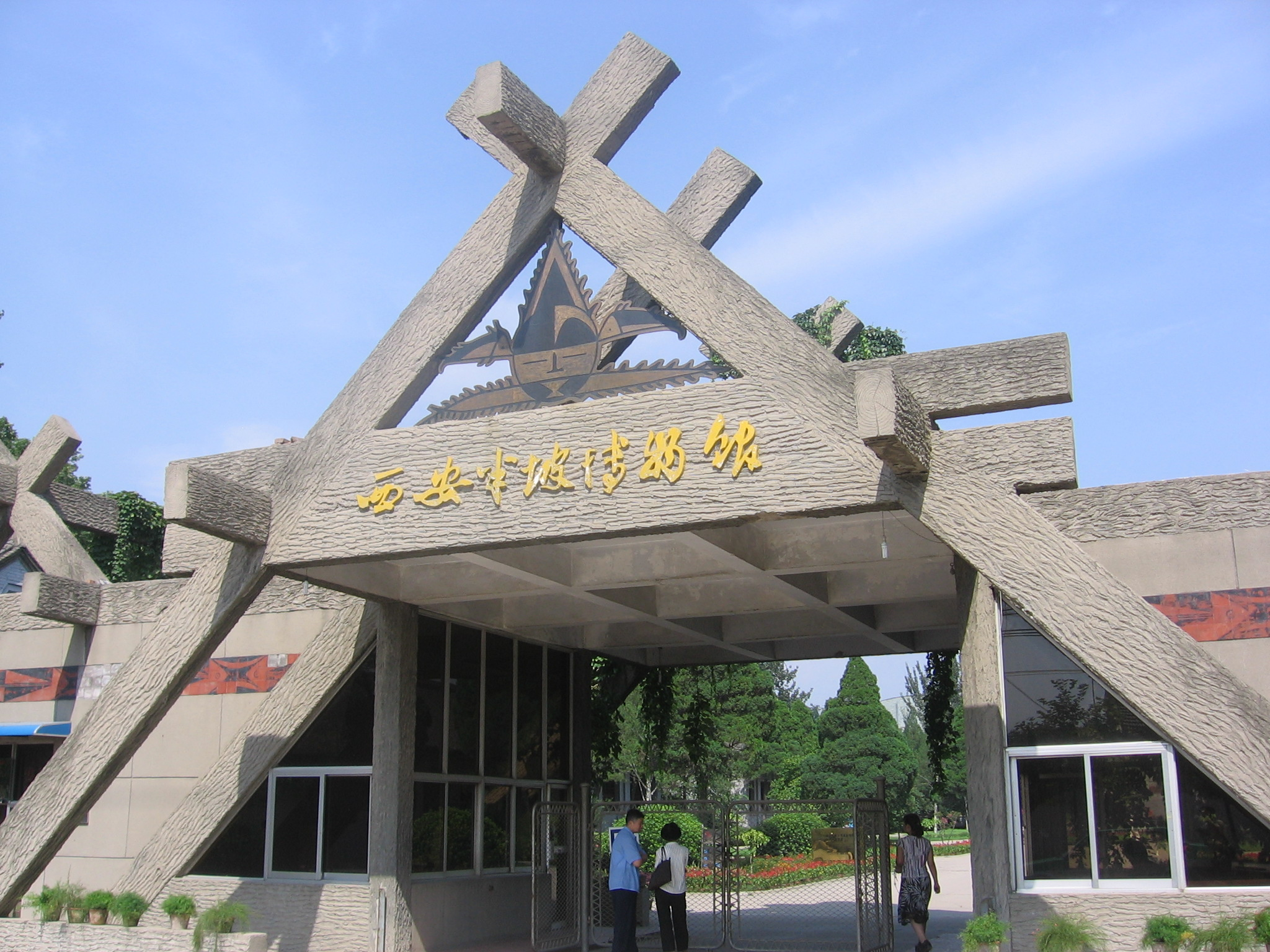
Museum entrance

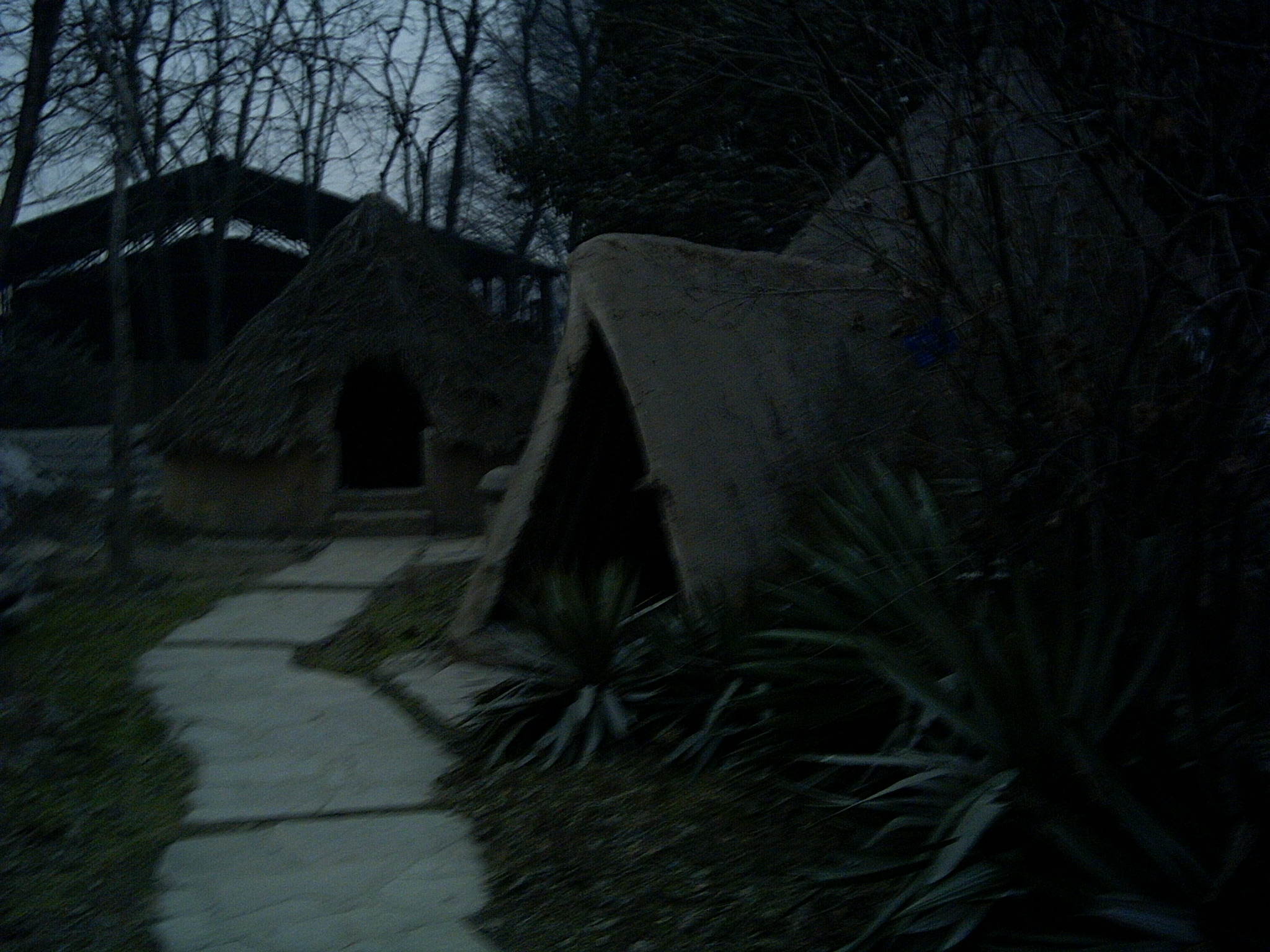
The reconstructed village

The Banpo Museum (Chinese: 西安半坡博物馆) is an archaeological museum in Baqiao District, Xi'an, Shaanxi, China. The museum houses artifacts from the type site of Banpo. The museum gives access to the excavated buildings, has a collection of artifacts from the site, and also has several reconstructed houses designed to resemble the Neolithic settlement.

Buses run there from the Terracotta Army and from central Xi'an.

== See also ==
- List of museums in China
