= Yuri Pines =

Ukraine-born Israeli sinologist (born 1964)

- יורי פינס
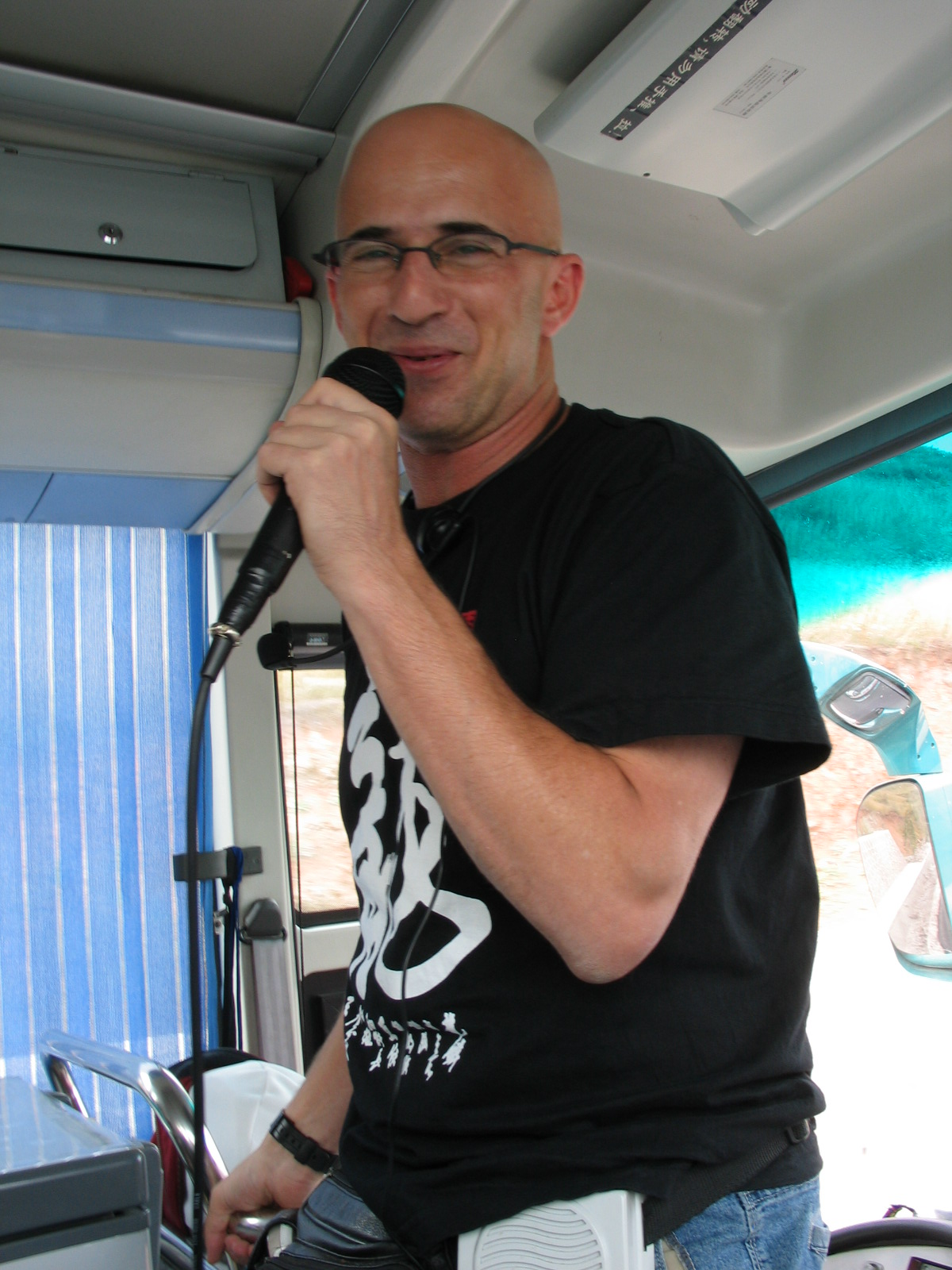
- Born: Юрий Анатольевич Пинес; 1964 (age 61–62); Kiev, Ukraine, Soviet Union
- Other name: 尤锐 (You Rui)

Academic background
- Education: Hebrew University

Academic work
- Institutions: Hebrew University

Yuri Pines (Hebrew: יורי פינס; Russian: Юрий Анатольевич Пинес; born 1964) is a Soviet-born Israeli sinologist and the Michael W. Lipson Professor of Chinese Studies at the Hebrew University in Jerusalem.

Pines was born in Kiev, modern Ukraine and immigrated to Israel in 1979. He studied under Lothar von Falkenhausen at UCLA and under Liu Zehua at Nankai University in Tianjin, earning a PhD at Hebrew University in 1998. He also earned his M.A. and B.A. in East Asian Studies at the Hebrew University in 1994 and 1989, respectively.

Pines attributes the endurance of the unified Chinese state, in both the imperial and contemporary periods, "to the fact that philosophers of the Warring States period, whatever their other differences, agreed on the principle of unification under a powerful ruler, and this principle became the basis of Chinese political thought."

== Books ==
- China's Aristocratic Age: Politics and Power in the Springs-and-Autumns Period (Princeton University Press, 2026)
- Zhou History Unearthed: The Bamboo Manuscript Xinian and Early Chinese Historiography (Columbia University Press, 2020)
- The Book of Lord Shang: Apologetics of State Power in Early China (Columbia University Press, 2017)
- The Everlasting Empire: Traditional Chinese Political Culture and Its Enduring Legacy, (Princeton University Press, 2012).
- Envisioning Eternal Empire: Chinese Political Thought of the Warring States Era, Honolulu: University of Hawaii Press, 2009.
- Foundations of Confucian Thought: Intellectual Life in the Chunqiu Period, 722-453 B.C.E. Honolulu: University of Hawaii Press, 2002.
- Mekorot Ha-Keisarut Ha-Sinit (Origins of the Chinese Empire [in Hebrew]). With Gideon Shelach. Yitzhak Shichor, ed. Volume 1 of Kol Asher mi-takhat le-shamaim: Sin Ha-Keisarit (All under Heaven: Imperial China [in Hebrew]). Raanana: The Open University Press, 2011.

יורי פינס וגדעון שלח עם יצחק שיחור (עורך ראשי), מקורות הקיסרות הסינית) כרך א של סדרה כל אשר מתחת לשמיים: סין הקיסרית). רעננה: האוניברסיטה הפתוחה, 2011.

- Yuri Pines and Gideon Shelach, with Yitzhak Shichor, ed., Sin ha-Keisarit ha-Mukdemet (Early Imperial China [in Hebrew]). Volume 2 of Kol Asher mi-takhat le-shamaim: Sin Ha-Keisarit (All under Heaven: Imperial China [in Hebrew]). Raanana: The Open University Press, 2013
- Sin ha-Keisarit ha-Meukheret (Late Imperial China [in Hebrew]) Volume 3 of Kol Asher mi-takhat le-shamaim: Sin Ha-Keisarit (All under Heaven: Imperial China [in Hebrew]).(in progress) with Michal Biran. Yitzhak Shichor, ed.,
