= Gideon Shelach-Lavi =

Israeli archaeologist (born 1959)

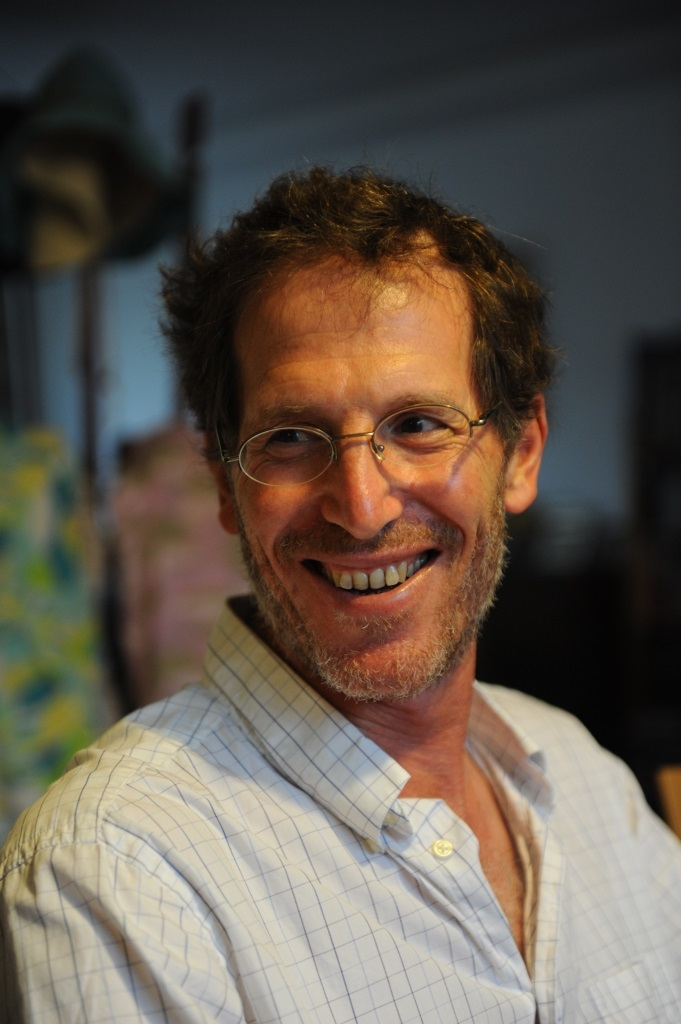
Shelach-Lavi in August 2012

Gideon Shelach-Lavi (Hebrew: גדעון שלח-לביא; born 10 September 1959) is an Israeli sinologist and archaeologist.

Shelach-Lavi his earned bachelor's degree from the Hebrew University of Jerusalem, followed by a doctorate in archaeology from the University of Pittsburgh, and is the Louis Freiberg Professor of East Asian Studies and the Chair of the Institute of African and Asian Studies at HUJI.

== Selected books ==
- Shelach-Lavi, Gideon (2016). Prehistoric Societies on the Northern Frontiers of China: Archaeological Perspectives on Identity Formation and Economic Change During the First Millennium BCE. Routledge. doi:10.4324/978131553928 (inactive 12 July 2025). ISBN 9781134944880.
- Pines, Yuri; Shelach-Lavi, Gideon; Von Falkenhausen, Lothar; Yates, Robin D. S., eds. (2013). Birth of an Empire: The State of Qin Revisited. Global, Area, and International Archive. ISBN 9781938169076.
- Shelach-Lavi, Gideon (1999). Leadership Strategies, Economic Activity, and Interregional Interaction: Social Complexity in Northeast China. Fundamental Issues in Archaeology. Springer. doi:10.1007/b110507. ISBN 9781280207174.
