= Amnya complex =

Archaeological site in western Siberia

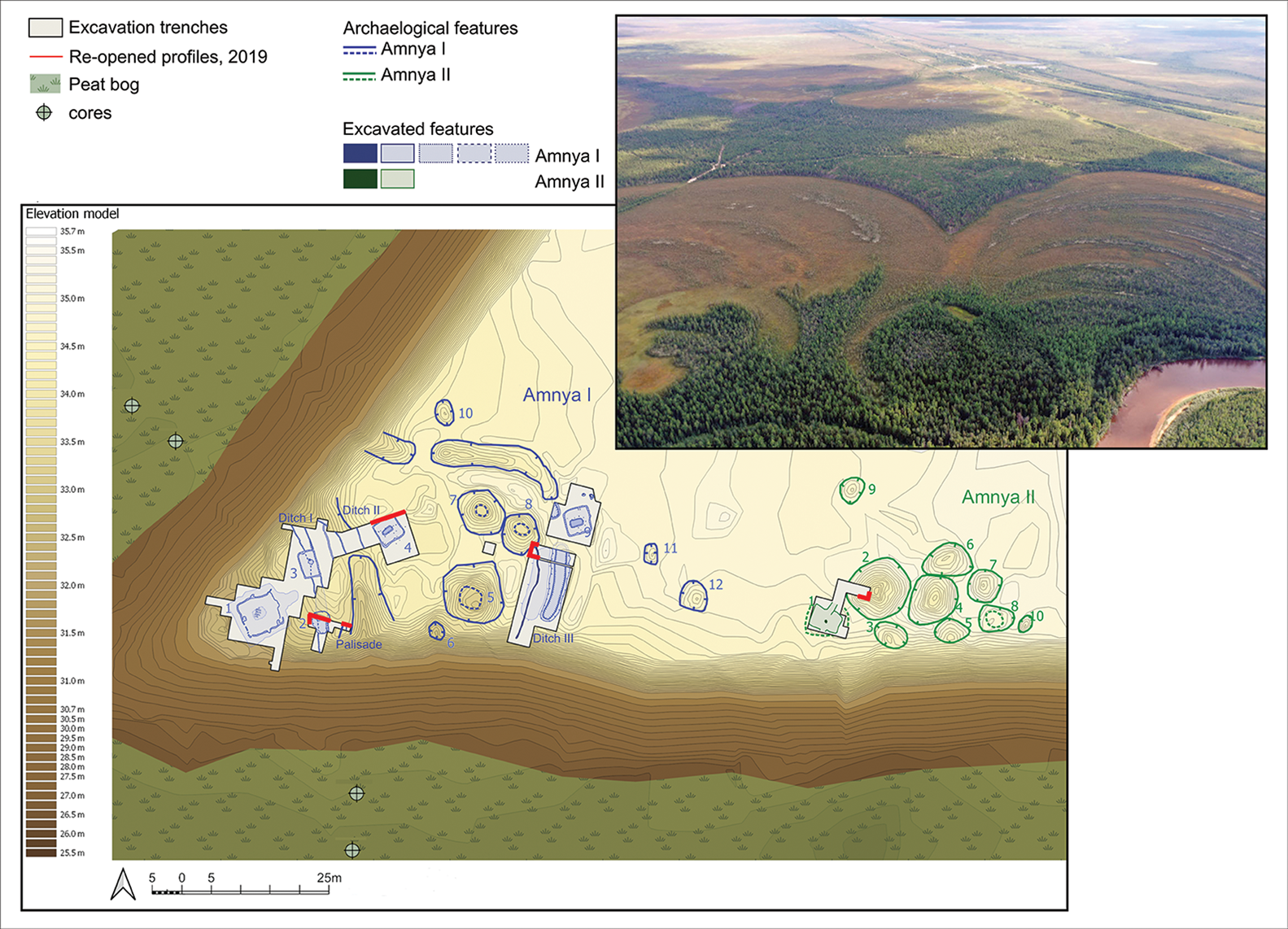

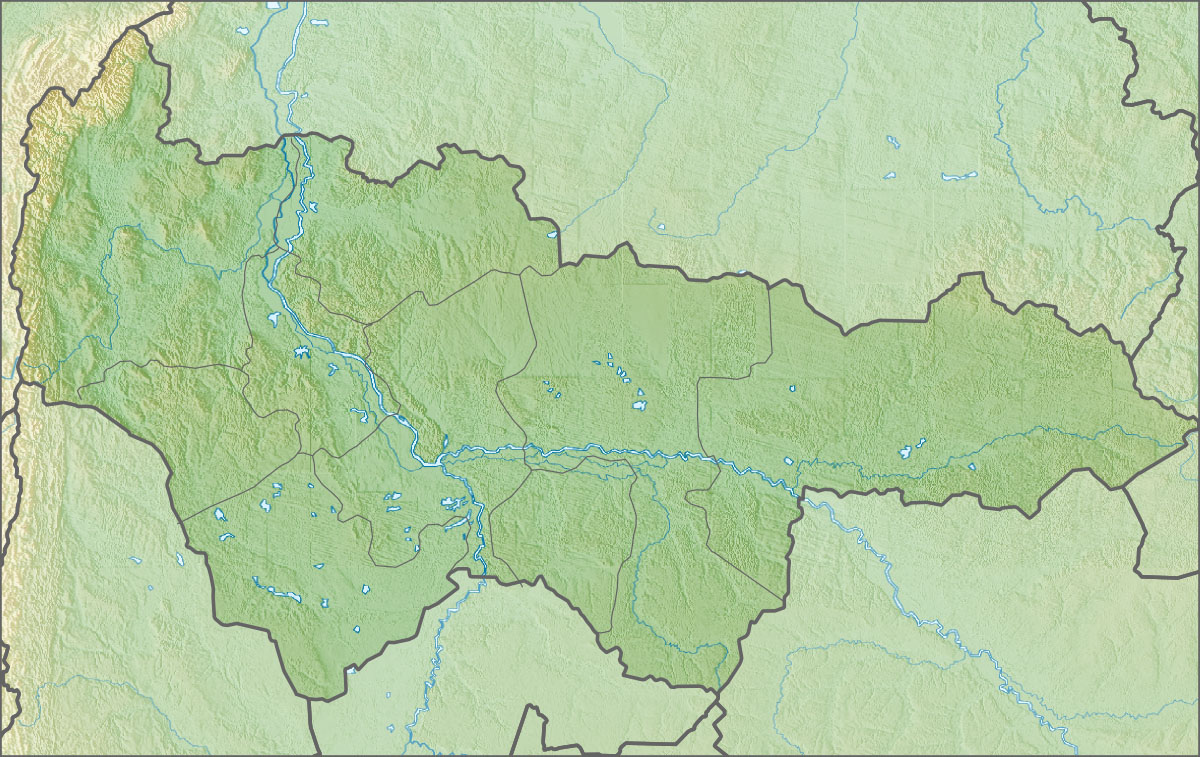
- Location within the Khanty-Mansi Autonomous Okrug Amnya complex (Russia)
- 63°41′26″N 67°19′50″E
- Type: Fortified settlement
- Periods: Neolithic / Chalcolithic
- Location: Beloyarsky District, Khanty-Mansi Autonomous Okrug, Russia

History
- Built: c. 6000 BCE

Site notes
- Excavation dates: 1987, 1993, 2000, and 2019

The Amnya complex (Russian: городище Амня, romanized: gorodishche Amnya) is an archaeologicalfortified settlement site near the Amnya River in the lower Ob basin of western Siberia, dating to the early Neolithic and Chalcolithic. It comprises two sections, Amnya I and Amnya II, each a series of ten pit-houses of varying sizes about 50 meters apart. They are built atop a steep escarpment formerly overlooking a river, now adjacent to a series of peat bogs. Unlike Amnya II, Amnya I has significant defensive earthworks in the form of banks and ditches.

Although the region had been occupied since the Mesolithic, the first fortifications were built at Amnya I some time after 6100 BCE, preceding a main settlement phase for both sites for much of the 6th millennium. The houses were frequently destroyed by fire, linked to endemic violent conflicts in the region. Both settlements were abandoned before a period of reoccupation during the 4th millennium BCE.

Amnya I is one of the oldest known fortified settlements, as well as the northernmost Stone Age fort. Built by a hunter-gatherer population, Amnya I significantly predates the arrival of agriculture in the region. The sites were first excavated in 1987, with later excavations taking place in 1993, 2000, and 2019. A related Neolithic site, Kirip-Vis-Yurgan-2, has been linked to the Amnya culture due to similarities in recovered artifacts.

== Background ==
Although typically associated with agrarian and pastoralist societies, a long archaeological tradition of fortification building is present among hunter-gatherers of the Western Siberia taiga, with nearly one hundred known sites over an 8000-year period stretching from the Neolithic to the Russian conquest of the 16th and 17th centuries CE. The historical emergence of a significant population and sociopolitical diversity among hunter-gatherer groups in the area has been linked to the abundance of game in the area. These resources lent themselves to storage and transport: game such as elk and reindeer could be smoked or frozen, and fish could be dried, ground to meal, or made into fish oil.

Although Western Siberia was sparsely inhabited during the regional Mesolithic, regional groups underwent significant societal and cultural formation c. 6000 BCE, with a number of Neolithic sites containing pit-houses, earthen fortifications such as embankments and ditches, and later innovations such as pottery. (Note: Although regionally termed Neolithic in Russian archaeology, the early Western Siberian Neolithic sites would be described as "Pottery Mesolithic" by Western terminology.) Eight fortified sites dating to the Stone Age are attested in Western Siberia, the earliest known fortifications in Northern Eurasia. Kholms, large earthen mounds frequently containing human skulls and figurines, are also attested in the region during this period, interpreted as ritualistic or sacrificial sites.

The regional fortifications are situated on high promontories and ridges overlooking low-lying areas. These sites typically comprised a central dwelling or complex fortified with earthworks and palisades, adjacent to a cluster of additional pit-houses. With some later exceptions, this fort building tradition largely evaporated during the Chalcolithic c. 4000 BCE, before reviving as a series of individually fortified dwellings during the early Bronze Age.

== Site complex ==
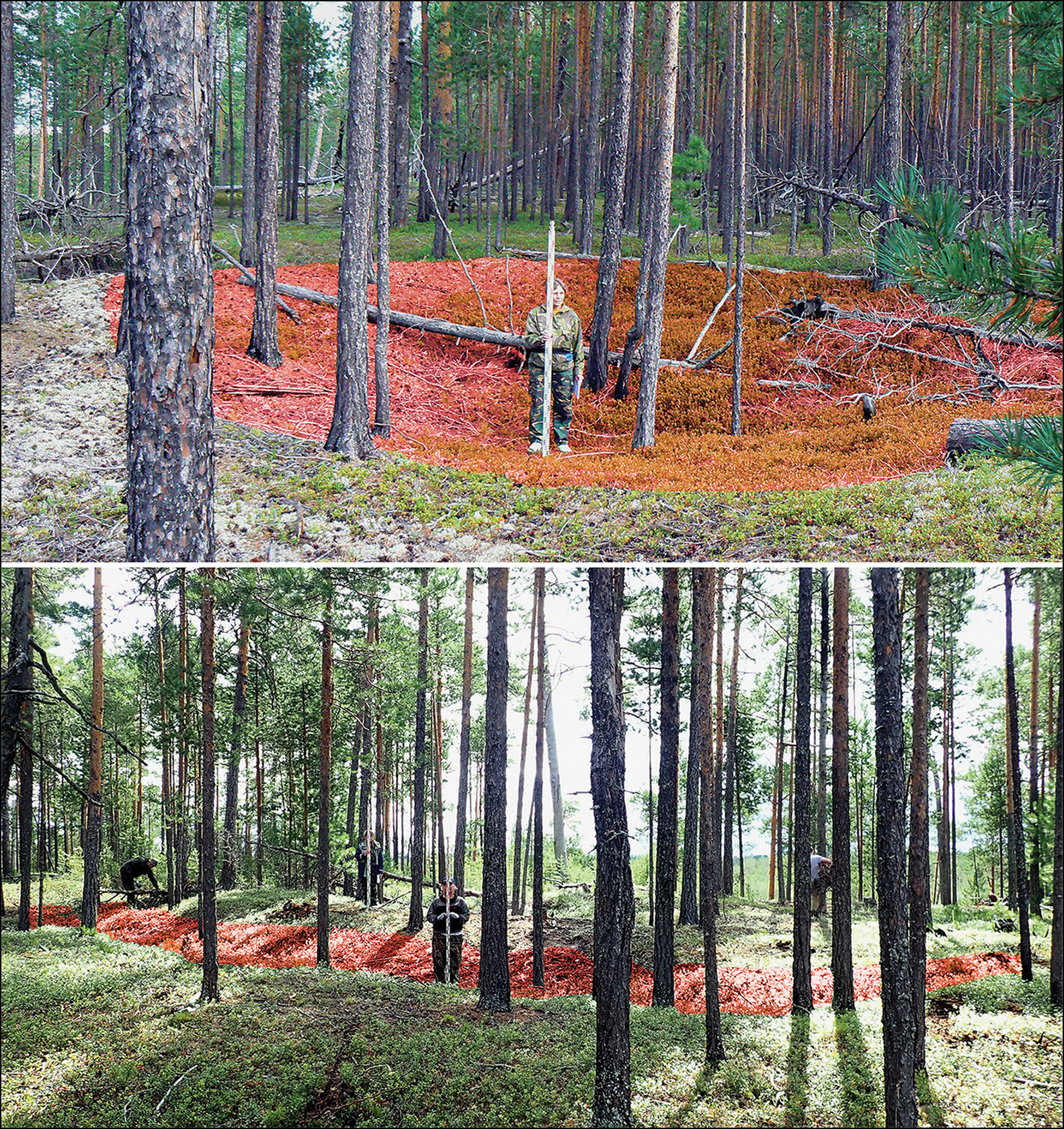
Researchers at Amnya I, with location of earthworks highlighted. From top to bottom: The depression of Pit-house 5, and the outer defensive wall, with Ditch III

The Amnya complex is situated at the edge of a promontory 4.5 kilometres (2.8 miles) southeast of the village of Kazym in the Beloyarsky District of the Khanty-Mansi Autonomous Okrug. The complex is split between two sites (Amnya I and Amnya II) roughly 50 meters (160 ft) apart. Amnya I, at the tip of the promontory, comprises a group of ten pit-houses surrounded by a series of raised banks and ditches enclosing the construction. Wooden palisades were erected along the ditches. Amnya II also comprises ten pit houses, although without any fortification. Although the site currently overlooks peat bogs, it was likely situated along a river between the Amnya River (now nearly a kilometer away) and a lake during its main period of occupation. Peat bogs likely formed in the 4th millennium BCE. Little garbage and no middens or large ash pits have been found at the site, with garbage likely taken to be buried elsewhere.

=== Structures ===
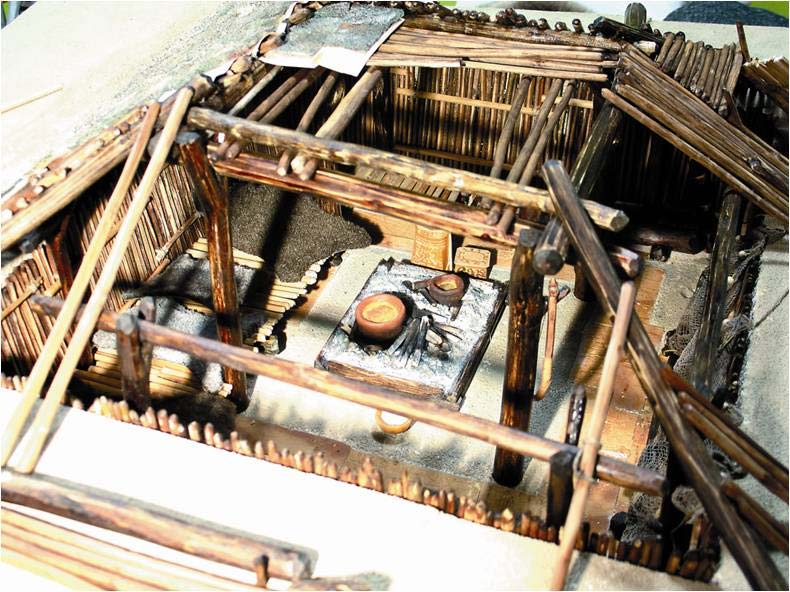
Model of Amnya I pit-house, Museum of Man and Nature, Khanty-Mansiysk

The pit-houses were permanent settlements, likely occupied year-round, and well-suited for the winter. The pit-houses at Amnya I are square or rectangular, oriented towards the north. The pits range from 0.6–1.8 meters (2–6 ft) in depth. The smallest measures 3.2 by 4 meters (10 by 13 ft), and the largest 6.1 by 6.8 meters (20 by 22 ft). While the larger pit-houses were dwellings, the smaller structures may have been either dwellings or outbuildings. The earthen walls of the pit-houses were likely lined with wood, as evidenced by grooves filled with charcoal loam along the perimeter of the pits. Elevated hearths were constructed in the center of the houses, placed atop a stone platform lined with wood. These hearths were likely vented with a closable smoke hole at the roof of the structure.

Traces of red ochre have been found on the floors of the houses, characteristic of regional sites during the Neolithic and Chalcolithic. Flooring at the site has not survived, although was likely made of wooden bars or planks. Similar to other sites in western Siberia, wooden benches likely lined the walls of the pit-houses, used both as beds and workstations. However, no direct evidence for these benches have been found. The pit-houses lacked antechambers, and were likely accessed through a ladder or notched tree trunk.

The roofing of the pit-houses was likely made of log poles and planks, and were hipped, pyramidal, or truncated pyramidal in shape. The lower end of the poles were outside the pit and covered in earth, with their upper ends resting atop a system of crossbeams, fixed atop vertically driven piles. Holes from the supporting beams and stakes are concentrated around the perimeter of the structures, as well as around the central hearth. Beams running through the pit-houses could be used for storing utensils, or drying clothes and food.

=== History ===
The emergence of significantly increased settlement in Western Siberia during the late 7th millennia BCE has been tentatively linked to the 8.2-kiloyear event. The earliest fortifications at Amnya I were constructed between 6100 and 6000 BCE. Both Amnya I and II were occupied during a "main settlement phase" during the 6th millennium BCE. The pit houses were frequently destroyed by fire over the timespan of occupation, likely due to local conflicts. Permanent structures and large numbers of weapons, including 28 polished arrowheads, recovered from the site suggest a degree of social stratification in the region, of which the residents of Amnya were elites. Both sites were reoccupied during the Chalcolithic period, in the 4th millennium BCE.

=== Artifacts ===
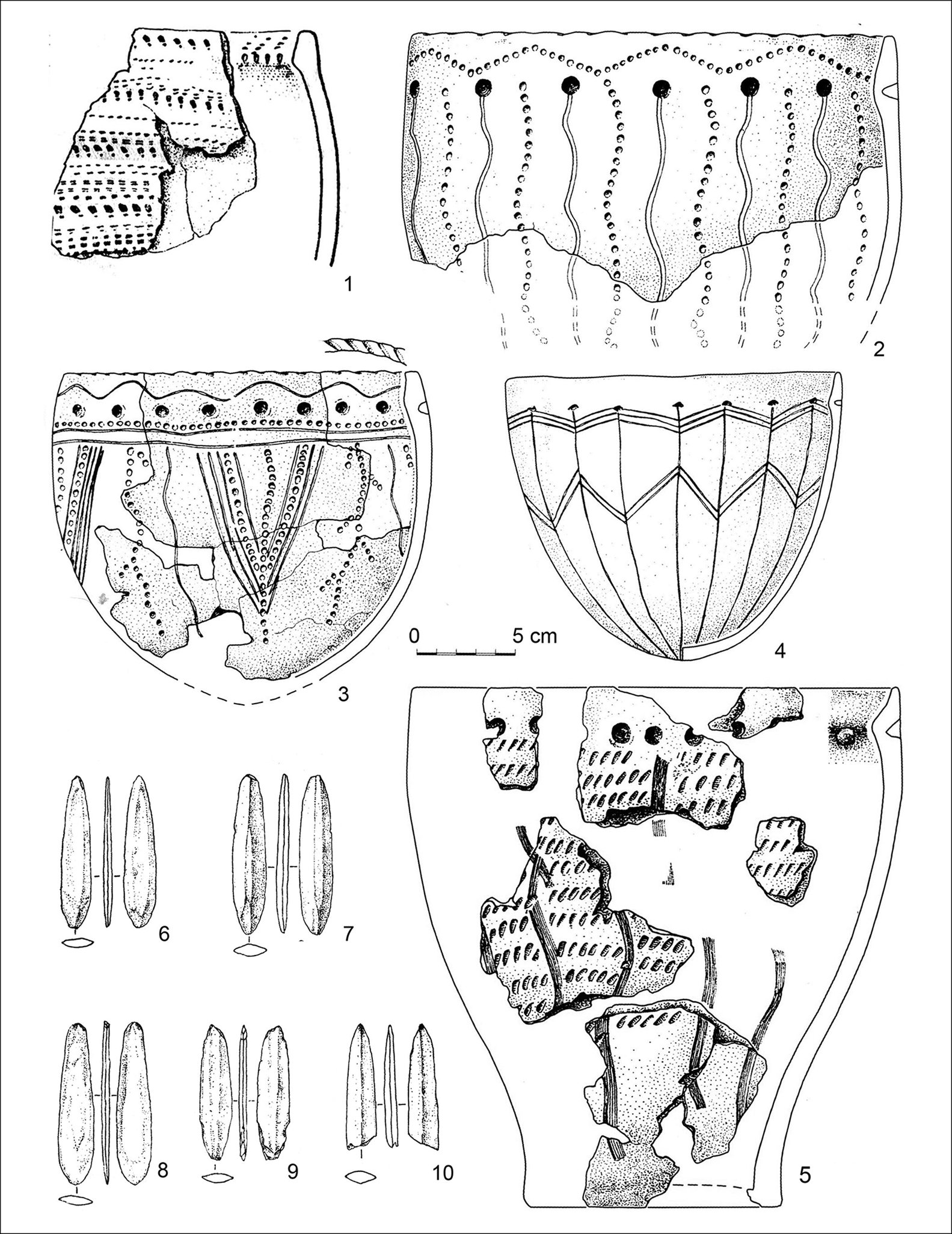
Pottery recovered from Amnya I

Around 45 pottery vessels have been found at the sites, divided between two ornamental traditions, one featuring prickled incised indentation, and the other flatter type stamped with combs. The incised type may be slightly older, but are roughly contemporaneous, as the two have been found together in some pit houses. Although pottery was traditionally associated with Neolithic agrarians, Western Siberian and East Asian Stone Age sites have increasingly yielded examples of hunter-gatherer pottery.

Various lithics have been found, including arrowheads. These were mainly fashioned from quartz, although some were made of flint or slate. A very small number of lithics made of stones such as sandstone, chalcedony, quartzite, and opoka have been found. Small calcined bone fragments of elk, reindeer, and beavers have been identified.

=== Related sites ===
A smaller neolithic site within the region, Kirip-Vis-Yugan-2, has been culturally linked to the Amnya complex due to the similarity of collected artifacts. Kirip-Vis-Yugan-2 consists of five pit houses, although no fortifications have been discovered. This site was occupied contemporaneously to the Amnya complex, during the 7th and 6th millennium BCE. Early Neolithic fortified sites in the region not linked to the Amnya culture include Kayukovo 2.

== Archaeology ==
The site was discovered in 1987 by V. N. Shirokov. Initial excavations on the site by V. M. Morozov and V. I. Stefanov took place from 1987 to 1989, with further excavations in 1993 and 2000 by a team led by Stefanov. In 2019, a team of Russian and German archaeologists led by L.L. Kosinskaya re-excavated the site, collecting charcoal samples for carbon dating. Alongside similar structures found in the pre-Columbian Americas, the Amnya complex and broader Western Siberian fortification-building tradition has increasingly informed study of fortifications built by hunter-gatherers. As well as the oldest known settlement of Northern Eurasia, the Amnya I fortification is one of the oldest known fortified settlements in the world, and the northernmost Stone Age fort.
