= Lothar von Falkenhausen =

American archaeologist (born 1959)

- Born: June 6, 1959 (age 66); Essen, North Rhine-Westphalia, West Germany
- Awards: Guggenheim Fellowship (2019)

Academic background
- Education: University of Bonn; Kyoto University; Peking University; Harvard University (PhD)

Academic work
- Discipline: Archaeologist and art historian
- Doctoral students: Kuei-chen Lin
- Main interests: Chinese Bronze Age

Chinese name
- Traditional Chinese: 羅泰
- Simplified Chinese: 罗泰
Transcriptions
Standard Mandarin
- Hanyu Pinyin: Luó Tài

Lothar von Falkenhausen (born June 6, 1959) is a German-American sinologist, archaeologist, and art historian specializing in the Chinese Bronze Age. After receiving a PhD in anthropology at Harvard, he briefly taught at Stanford and the University of California, Riverside, before transferring to the University of California, Los Angeles, (UCLA) in 1993, where he has remained since. He has served in a number of field research roles in China, as well as an instructor at the International Archaeological Field School at the Neolithic Yangguanzhai site.

He was appointed by Barack Obama to an anti–illicit antiquities trade advisory committee in 2012. He was awarded a Guggenheim Fellowship in 2019, which he used to fund a monograph of the economic history of China prior to the Qin dynasty. In addition to his work at UCLA, he serves as a Changjiang Professor at Xibei University and edits the Journal of East Asian Archaeology.

== Biography ==
Lothar von Falkenhausen was born in Essen, West Germany, on June 6, 1959. He attended the University of Bonn before transferring to Peking University. After additionally studying at Kyoto University, he pursued his PhD in anthropology at Harvard, which he obtained in 1988. From 1988 to 1990 he taught at Stanford University. After teaching at the University of California, Riverside, for three years, he transferred to the University of California, Los Angeles, where has remained since. His work centers around Bronze Age China, with an early focus on musical instruments. His first book, Suspended Music: Chime-Bells in the Culture of Bronze Age China, was published in 1993.

At UCLA, he collaborated with Peking University to investigate ancient salt production facilities in Sichuan and the broader Yangtze River basin. He participated in investigations of the Zhongba site. In 2010, he was appointed as the Instructor of Record for the International Archaeological Field School at the Late Neolithic Yangguanzhai site. In 2012, he was appointed by President Barack Obama to the Cultural Property Advisory Committee, an anti–illicit antiquities trade advisory body under the United States Department of State. He served as the assistant director of the Cotsen Institute of Archaeology at UCLA from 2004 to 2011.

He was appointed as an honorary professor at Zhejiang University in 2014, a title usually given by the university to Nobel Prize laureates. In 2018, he was appointed as a part-time Changjiang Professor at the Xibei University in Xi'an. He was awarded a Guggenheim Fellowship the following year, seeking to write a monograph on the economic evolution of China prior to its unification under the Qin dynasty.

He is a member of the American Academy of Arts and Sciences, the American Philosophical Society, and the German Archaeological Institute, and an honorary research fellow of the Shaanxi Archaeological Academy. He is also a corresponding member of the French Académie des Inscriptions et Belles-Lettres. He is the editor of the Journal of East Asian Archaeology and the Early China Special Monographs Series.
