= Society for East Asian Archaeology =

The Society for East Asian Archaeology (SEAA) is a society for the study of east Asian archaeology. The current president of the society is Dr. Francis Allard, professor in the department of anthropology at Indiana University of Pennsylvania, Indiana, PA, USA.

The society publishes Bulletin of the Society for East Asian Archaeology.
