= Yangguanzhai =

Archaeological type site in China

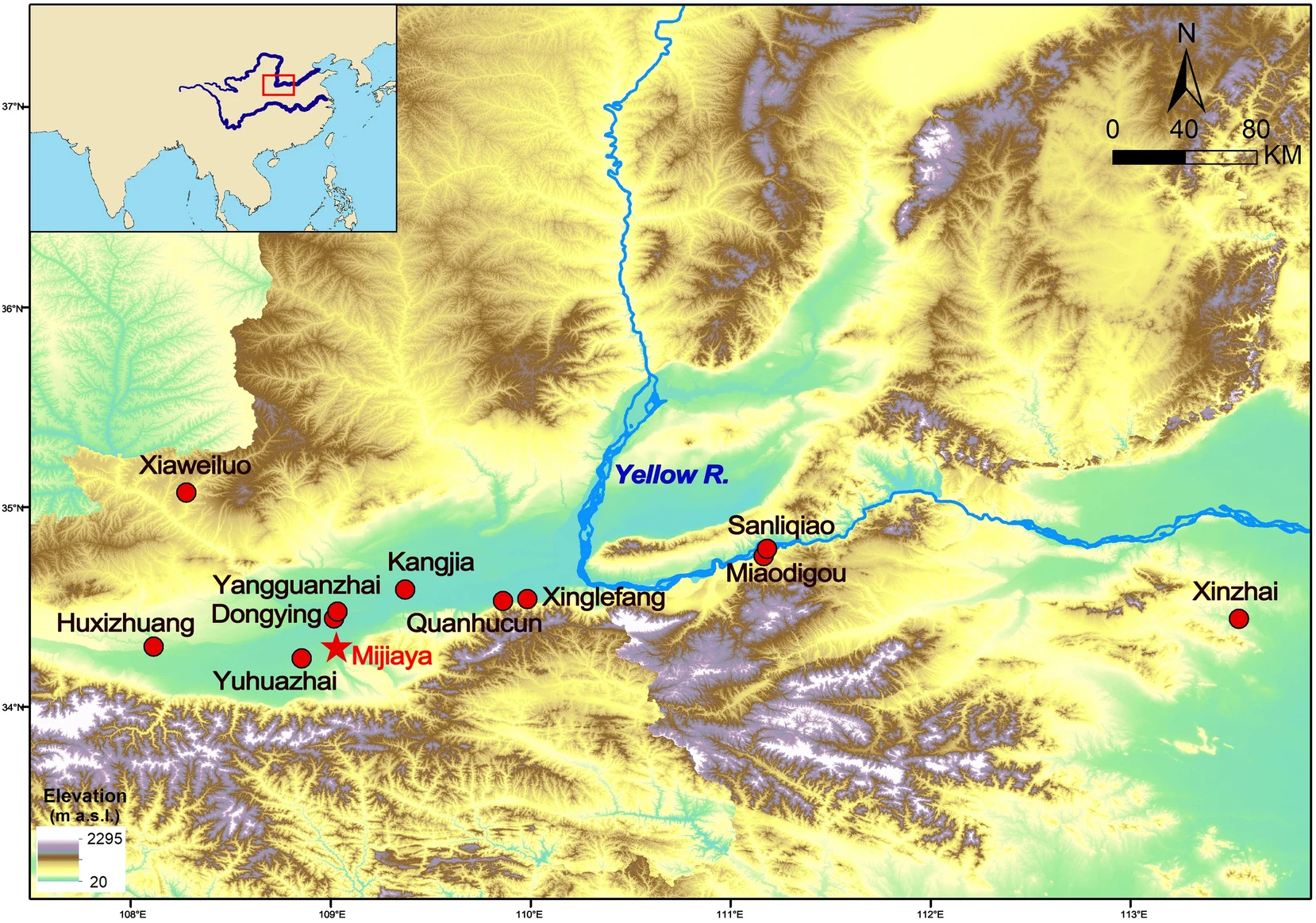
Mijiaya, Yangguanzhai, and other Neolithic sites.

Yangguanzhai (traditional Chinese: 楊官寨; simplified Chinese: 杨官寨) is an archaeological site discovered in 2004 at Gaoling County, Shaanxi Province. The site is associated with the Miaodigou phase (4000-3000 BC) of the Yangshao culture. As of 2009, survey data suggests that the cultural remains at Yangguanzhai cover an area of over 800,000 square meters, making it one of the largest Neolithic sites in China.

== Archaeology ==
Since 2004, excavations on the site were conducted by the Shaanxi Provincial Institute of Archaeology and the Institute for Field Research.
