= Glossary of Zhuangzi exegesis =

This is a glossary of Zhuangzi (Chuang-tzu) exegesis (for further details on the early Chinese text, see the main article "Zhuangzi (book)" and the biographical article "Zhuang Zhou").

The glossary pertains to the transmission and commentary history of the Chinese literary and philosophical text, one of the two basic texts of the Daoist tradition, which is known in English under different titles.

Zhuangzi (simplified Chinese: 庄子; traditional Chinese: 莊子; pinyin: Zhuāngzǐ "Master Zhuang") or Zhuang Zhou (simplified Chinese: 庄周; traditional Chinese: 莊周; pinyin: Zhuāng Zhōu; Wade–Giles: Chuang Chou; c. 369-286 B.C) was a Daoist philosopher and poet during China's Warring States period. He holds an important position in the history of Chinese philosophy, literature, aesthetics, and intellectual thought. Among the prose works of various thinkers, Zhuangzi's writings are the most vivid and wonderful; they are rich in poetic atmosphere, picturesque in style, and display strong individual characteristics.

Two of the earliest known commentators to the Zhuangzi - before the textual editing by Guo Xiang (in 33 chapters) - are Cui Zhuan 崔譔 (fl. 290 CE) and Xiang Xiu 向秀 (ca. 227−272 CE).

Today there are four common types of Zhuangzi editions: 1. consisting of only the text; 2. only with Guo Xiang's commentary (zhu); 3. with Guo Xiang's commentary followed by Lu Deming's notes (yinyi); 4. with Guo Xiang's commentary and Cheng Xuanying's sub-commentary (shu).

The German sinologist Christoph Harbsmeier characterizes the broad spectrum of the commentators with the words:

These commentaries include those by philosophers like Guo Xiang (died 312 A.D.), by the eccentric emperor Jianwen (503 — 511 A.D.), by linguists like Lu Deming (died 630 A.D.), by Buddhist monks like Cheng Xuanying (fl. 631 A.D.), by the iconoclastic Neo-Confucian philosopher Li Zhi (1527–1602), by a great Neo-Confucian philosopher like Wang Fuzhi (1619–1692), by philologists like Guo Qingfan (1845–1897), and by embattled Marxists like Guan Feng (who published his commentary in 1961).

Modern spade work in Chinese textual criticism did Wang Shumin 王叔岷 (1914–2008), who revised and expanded his Zhuangzi jiaoshi 庄子校释 / 莊子校釋 (Shanghai: Shangwu, 1947) later as → Zhuangzi jiaoquan 庄子校诠 / 莊子校詮 (Taipei: Institute of History and Philology, 1988), whereby his later textual research was included in the later volume of 1988. He based his research on reliable editions, added critical comments by Qing scholars and included reconstituted redactions of lost fragments of the Zhuangzi, incorporating most of the fragmentary and indirect testimony to the text. According to Harold D. Roth (in: ECT), it is "the most valuable work of textual criticism ever written" on the Zhuangzi.

A new restored version is given in the Zhuangzi fuyuan ben 庄子復原本 (abb. ZZFYB) by Zhang Yuanshan 张远山 (2 vols., Beijing 2021), reconstructing a Wei Mou edition (Wei Mou ban 魏牟版) and Liu An edition (Liu An ban 刘安版).

The importance for the understanding of Daoism can also be derived from the fact (mentioned by Chinaknowledge), that the

[...] imperial series Siku quanshu 四庫全書, pretending to be a "complete collection" of writings, reduced the Daoist part practically to commentaries on the Daodejing, Zhuangzi 莊子 (Nanhua zhenjing 南華真經) or Liezi 列子 (Chongxu zhide zhenjing 沖虛至德真經) and shifted the Daoist section to the very end of the Masters category.

== Glossary ==
Note: The following glossary of Zhuangzi exegesis (the Chinese word for exegesis is xunguxue: simplified Chinese: 训诂学; traditional Chinese: 訓詁學; pinyin: xùngǔxué; Wade–Giles: hsün-ku-hsüeh) is not a glossary of the Zhuangzi contents, but rather of its transmission, editions, and commentary tradition — in other words, of the philological and exegetical tradition surrounding the text. Some book titles are roughly translated. The information provided does not claim to be complete or up-to-date (for a good overview, compare the voluminous collections edited by Yan Lingfeng 嚴靈峰, or the overview of Zhuangzi studies especially by Fang Yong 方勇 (who is also the author of Zhuangzi xueshi 莊子學史 (History of Zhuangzi studies). 3 vols. Beijing: Renmin chubanshe, 2008; later revised and enlarged), mentioned in the section: Bibliography (Overviews and collections)). - See also Appendix.

=== A ===
abbreviations
ChK = Chinaknowledge (Ulrich Theobald, ed.) / ctext = Chinese Text Project / DZ = Daoist Canon (道藏) / ECT = Early Chinese Texts (M. Loewe, ed.) / HYDCD = Hanyu da cidian 汉语大词典 / HYDZD = Hanyu da zidian 汉语大字典 / SBCK = Sibu congkan 四部丛刊 / SKDCD = Siku da cidian 四库大辞典 / SKQS = Siku quanshu 四库全书 / ZZFYB = Zhuangzi fuyuan ben 庄子复原本 (Zhang Yuanshan) / ZZYG = Zhuangzi yigu 庄子译诂 (Yang Liuqiao) / ZZJC = Zhuzi jicheng 诸子集成 / ZZJJ = Zhuangzi jijie 庄子集解 (Wang Xianqian) / ZZJQ = Zhuangzi jiaoquan 庄子校诠 (Wang Shumin) / ZZJS = Zhuangzi jishi 庄子集释 (Guo Qingfan) / ZZYZ = Zhuangzi yizheng 庄子义证 (Ma Xulun) / ZZZJ = Zhuangzi zuanjian 庄子纂笺 (Qian Mu). - See also Short titles / Persons.

=== C ===
Cao Chuji
Cao Chuji 曹础基, scholar; author of Zhuangzi qianzhu 庄子浅注 ("Shallow Commentary of the Zhuangzi") (Zhonghua shuju, Beijing 1982).

Cao Shoukun
Cao Shoukun 曹受坤 (1879–1959), scholar and calligrapher; author of Zhuangzi zhexue 庄子哲学, and Zhuangzi neipian jieshuo 庄子内篇解说.

Chan Zhuang
Chan Zhuang 闡莊 (1 juan), authored by Chen Zhu 陈柱 / 陳柱.

Chapter titles
(33 chapters)

Guo Xiang edition (alphabetically) Dá shēng 達生 19 / Dà zōngshī 大宗師 6 / Dào zhí 盜跖 29 / Dé chōng fú 德充符 5 / Gēngsāng Chǔ 庚桑楚 23 / Kè yì 刻意 15 / Liè Yùkòu 列禦寇 32 / Mǎtí 馬蹄 9 / Piān mǔ 駢拇 8 / Qiū shuǐ 秋水 17 / Qí wù lùn 齊物論 2 / Qū qiè 胠篋 10 / Ràng wáng 讓王 28 / Rénjiān shì 人間世 4 / Shān mù 山木 20 / Shàn xìng 繕性 16 / Shuō jiàn 說劍 30 / Tiān dào 天道 13 / Tiāndì 天地 12 / Tiān yùn 天運 14 / Tiānxià 天下 33 / Tiánzǐ fāng 田子方 21 / Wài wù 外物 26 / Xiāoyáo yóu 逍遙遊 1 / Xú wúguǐ 徐無鬼 24 / Yǎngshēng zhǔ 養生主 3 / Yìng dì wáng 應帝王 7 / Yùyán 寓言 27 / Yú fù 漁父 31 / Zài yòu 在宥 11 / Zé yáng 則陽 25 / Zhī běi yóu 知北遊 22 / Zhì lè 至樂 18 (7 neipian 內篇 (1-7), 15 waipian 外篇 (8-22), 11 zapian 雜篇 (23-33))

(in short) Xiao 逍 (1); Qi 齐 (2); Yang 养 (3); Ren 人 (4); De 德 (5); Da 大 (6); Ying 应 (7); Pian 骈 (8); Ma 马 (9); Qu 胠 (10); Zai 在 (11); Di 地 (12); Dao 道 (13); Yun 运 (14); Yi 意 (15); Xing 性 (16); Shui 水 (17); Le 乐 (18); Sheng 生 (19); Mu 木 (20); Fang 方 (21); You 游/遊 (22); Geng 庚 (23); Xu 徐 (24); Ze 则 (25); Wai 外 (26); Yu 寓 (27); Rang 让 (28); Dao 盗 (29); Tuo 说 (30); (Shuo 说 see Tuo 说); Yu 渔 (31); Lie 列 (32); Tian 天 (33)

(52 chapters)

Wei Mou edition (29 chapters - see ZZFYB) 1. Xiāo yáo yóu 逍遥游, 2. Qí wù lùn 齐物论, 3. Yǎng shēng zhǔ 养生主, 4. Rén jiān shì 人间世, 5. Dé chōng fú 德充符, 6. Dà zōng shī 大宗师, 7. Yìng dì wáng 应帝王, 8. Yù yán 寓言, 9. Shān mù 山木, 10. Dá shēng 达生, 11. Zhì lè 至乐, 12. Cáo shāng 曹商△, 13. Qiū shuǐ 秋水, 14. Tián Zǐ fāng 田子方, 15. Zhī běi yóu 知北游, 16. Gēng sāng chǔ 庚桑楚, 17. Xú wú guǐ 徐无鬼, 18. Guǎn zhòng 管仲△, 19. Zé yáng 则阳, 20. Wài wù 外物, 21. Ràng wáng 让王, 22. Dào zhí 盗跖, 23. Liè yù kòu 列御寇, 24. Tiān xià 天下, 25. Huì shī 惠施▲, 26. Yǔ tài dìng 宇泰定△, 27. Qū qiè 胠箧, 28. Tiān dì 天地, 29. Tiān yùn 天运
Liu An edition (23 chapters - see ZZFYB) 30. Pián mǔ 骈拇, 31. Mǎ tí 马蹄, 32. Kè yì 刻意, 33. Shàn xìng 缮性, 34. Zài yòu 在宥, 35. Tiān dào 天道, 36. Shuō jiàn 说剑, 37. Yú fǔ 渔父, 38. Tài chū 泰初△, 39. Bǎi lǐ xī 百里奚△, 40. Zǐ zhāng 子张△, 41. Mǎ chuí 马捶▲, 42. Yàn yì 阏弈▲, 43. Yóu fú 游凫▲, 44. Zǐ xū 子胥▲, 45. Yì xiū 意修▲, 46. Zhī yán 卮言▲, 47. Chóng yán 重言△, 48. Wèi lěi xū 畏累虚▲, 49. Kàng sāng zǐ 亢桑子▲, 50. Zhuāng zǐ hòu jiě 庄子后解▲, 51. Zhuāng zǐ lüè yào 庄子略要▲, 52. Jiě shuō dì sān 解说第三△ (cf. ZZFYB, here both additionally numbered)

Chen Bixu
Chen Bixu 陈碧虚, see Chen Jingyuan 陈景元.

Chen Erdao
Chen Erdao 陈尔道 (i.e. Chen Zhi'an 陳治安, Ming), author of Nanhua benyi 南華本義 Online.

Chen Guying
Chen Guying 陈鼓应 (born 1935), modern philosopher and philologist, known for works on Daoism and Neo-Daoism; author of Zhuangzi jinzhu jinyi 庄子今注今译 (Zhonghua shuju 中华书局, Beijing 1983); Lao-Zhuang xinlun 老庄新论 (Shanghai guji chubanshe 上海古籍出版社, Shanghai 1992).

Chen Jingyuan
Chen Jingyuan 陈景元/陳景元 [Ch'en Ching-yüan] (courtesy name Taichu 太初, pseudonym Bixuzi 碧虚子 (1035–1094), Song dynasty Daoist recluse, philologist; author of Nanhua zhenjing zhangju yinyi 南华真经章句音义, textual-critical notes on the Zhuangzi, listing variants from lost Tang and Song editions. The author also commentated the Daodejing.

Chen Jiru
Chen Jiru 陈继儒 / 陳繼儒 (1558–1639) (Ming dynasty), author of Zhuangzi leiyu 庄子类语, Zhuangzi cui 庄子粹, and Zhuangzi jun 莊子雋 (1 juan).

Chen Pinqing
Chen Pinqing 陈品卿, author of Zhuangxue yanjiu 庄学研究 (Taiwan Zhonghua shuju 台湾中华书局, Taibei 1982).

Chen Rongxuan
Chen Rongxuan 陈荣选/陳榮選, author of Nanhua quanjing fenzhang jujie 南華全經分章句解, also called Nanhua jing jujie 南华经句解 (4 juan).

Chen Shen
Chen Shen 陈深 (juren in 1549), author of Zhuangzi pinjie 庄子品节.

Chen Shouchang
Chen Shouchang 陳壽昌 (Qing), author of Zhuangzi zhengyi fulu 莊子正義附錄 (3 juan) and Zhuangzi zhengyi 莊子正義 (4 juan).

Chen Xiangdao
Chen Xiangdao 陈祥道 (1042–1093), Northern Song dynasty scholar; wrote the commentary Zhuangzi zhu 庄子注 (now lost), in which he drew on many classical texts such as the Zhouyi, Daodejing, Shangshu, Lunyu, Mengzi, Guanzi, Wenzi, and Liezi for interpretation (cf. klassiekchineseteksten.nl: Commentaren). Cited in Nanhua zhenjing yihai zuanwei 南华真经义海纂微 by Chu Boxiu 褚伯秀 (Southern Song dynasty).

Chen Yaosen
Chen Yaosen 陈耀森, author of Zhuangzi xinkui 庄子新窥 (Taibei: Taiwan Shangwu yinshuguan 台湾商务印书馆, 1988).

Chen Yidian
Chen Yidian 陳懿典 (Ming), author of Nanhua jing jingjie 南華經精解 (8 juan).

Chen Zhi'an
Chen Zhi'an 陳治安 (Ming), author of Nanhua zhenjing benyi fulu 南華真經本義附錄 (8 juan) and Nanhua zhenjing benyi 南華真經本義 (16 juan).

Chen Zhiqing
Chen Zhiqing 陈知青, author of Lao-Zhuang sixiang sujiang 老庄思想粹讲 (Dingyuan wenhua shiye gongsi 顶渊文化事业公司, Taibei 1989).

Chen Zhu
Chen Zhu 陈柱/陳柱, modern scholar; author of Laozi yu Zhuangzi 老子与庄子 and Zhuangzi neipian xue 庄子内篇学, author of Chan Zhuang 闡莊 (1 juan).

Cheng Congda
Cheng Congda 程從大 (Qing dynasty), author of Yong Zhuang ji 詠莊集 (1 juan).

Cheng Xuanying
Cheng Xuanying 成玄英 [Ch'eng Hsüan-ying] (courtesy name Zishi 子實 (fl. mid-seventy century), Tang dynasty Daoist monk, representative of the "School of Double Mystery" (Chongxuan); author of Zhuangzi shu 庄子疏. This commentary survives as a sub-commentary to (Jin) Guo Xiang in the Nanhua zhenjing zhushu 南華真經注疏.

Cheng Yining
Cheng Yining 程以宁 / 程以寧 (Ming dynasty), author of Nanhua zhenjing zhushu 南華真經注疏 (33 juan).

Cheng Zhaoxiong
Cheng Zhaoxiong 程兆熊, author of Daojia sixiang: Lao-Zhuang dayi 道家思想：老庄大义 (Taibei 台北: Mingwen shuju 明文书局, 1985).

Chongxu zhide zhenjing
Chongxu zhide zhenjing 沖虛至德真經, see Liezi 列子

Chu Boxiu
Chu Boxiu 褚伯秀 (courtesy name Shixiu 師秀, pseudonyms Xue Zhe 雪轍, Huan Zhongzi 環中子, 1230–1287?, Song dynasty), Daoist priest, scholar; author of Zhuangzi yihai zuanwei 庄子义海纂微, this main work, also known as Nanhua zhenjing yihai zuanwei 南華真經義海纂微, comprises 106 bamboo scrolls, contains 13 different commentaries from the Wei-Jin to the late Song period, and focuses on the concepts of yangxing (nourishing one's nature), fuxing (returning to one's nature), and "total forgetting" (jianwang). (cf. klassiekchineseteksten.nl: Commentaren)

Classical texts relevant to the Zhuangzi (ZZFYB)
1 Laozi 老子，2 Lunyu 论语，3 Zhouyi 周易，4 Shijing 诗经，5 Zuozhuan 左传，6 Mozi 墨子，7 Guanzi 管子，8 Shizi 尸子，9 Shangjun shu 商君书，10 Mengzi 孟子，11 Mozi 馍子，12 Yanzi chunqiu 晏子春秋，13 Zhanguo zonghengjia shu 战国纵横家书，14 Gongsun Longzi 公孙龙子，15 Xunzi 荀子，16 Lülan 吕览，17 Han Feizi 韩非子，18 Wenzi 文子，19 Heguanzi 鹖冠子，20 Shanhaijing 山海经，21 Chuci 楚辞，22 Lu Jia Xinyu 陆贾新语，23 Jia Yi Xinshu 贾谊新书，24 Hanshi waizhuan 韩诗外传，25 Huainanzi 淮南子，26 Chunqiu fanlu 春秋繁露，27 Shiji 史记，28 Zhanguoce 战国策，29 Xinxu 新序，30 Shuoyuan 说苑，31 Fayan 法言，32 Hanshu 汉书，33 Hou Hanshu 后汉书，34 Sanguozhi 三国志，35 Ruan Ji ji 阮籍集，36 Ji Kang ji 嵇康集，37 Wang Bi ji 王弼集，38 wei Liezi 伪列子，39 Baopuzi 抱朴子，40 Xie Lingyun ji 谢灵运集，41 Tao Yuanming ji 陶渊明集，42 Shishuo xinyu 世说新语，43 Wenxin diaolong 文心雕龙，44 Yanshi jiaxun 颜氏家训，45 Wenxuan 文选，46 Taiping yulan 太平御览，47 Yiwen leiju 艺文类聚，48 Qunshu zhiyao 群书治要，49 Chuxue ji 初学记，50 Bai-Kong liutie 白孔六帖 (Zhang Yuanshan: Zhuangzi fuyuan ben (2 vols.), Beijing 2021, p. 1109)

Cui Dahua
Cui Dahua 崔大华: Zhuangzi qijie 庄子歧解 (Zhengzhou: Zhongzhou guji chubanshe 中州古籍出版社, 1988); Zhuangxue yanjiu 庄学研究 (Renmin chubanshe 人民出版社, Beijing 1992).

Cui Zhuan
Cui Zhuan 崔𬤥 / 崔譔 [Ts'ui Chuan] (3rd–4th century), early commentator on the Zhuangzi before Guo Xiang's textual revision. Author of a commentary in ten scrolls, covering 27 chapters (7 inner and 20 outer) which is lost, but fragments can be found in Lu Deming's Zhuangzi yinyi.

=== D ===
Dai Shen
Dai Shen 戴诜: Zhuangzi yishu 庄子义疏, 8 juan.

Daoist Canon
Daoist Canon, see Daozang.

Daojia sixiang - Lao-Zhuang dayi
Daojia sixiang: Lao-Zhuang dayi 道家思想：老庄大义, by Cheng Zhaoxiong 程兆熊 (Taibei 台北: Mingwen shuju 明文书局, 1985).

Daozang
Daozang 道藏 Daoist Canon (cf. Schipper/Verellen: A Historical Companion to the Daozang) - See also Appendix: Zhengtong Daozang 正统道藏.
The most important Zhuangzi commentaries contained in the Daoist Canon (Daozang) are according to Livia Kohn: Nanhua zhenjing zhushu (Commentary and Subcommentary to the Nanhua zhenjing) by Guo Xiang (zhu), respectively Cheng Xuanying (shu), Nanhua zhenjing kouyi (Glosses to the Nanhua zhenjing) by Lin Xiyi, Nanhua zhenjing zhangju yinyi (Phonetic and Semantic Glosses to the Sections and Sentences of the Nanhua zhenjing) and Nanhua zhenjing zhangju yushi (Supplement to the Phonetic and Semantic Glosses to the Sections and Sentences of the Nanhua zhenjing) by Chen Jingyuan, and Zhuangzi yi (Wings to the Zhuangzi) by Jiao Hong (Livia Kohn, in: Encyclopedia of Taoism, Fabrizio Pregadio, ed., 2013 (2 vols.), online) .

Deqing
Deqing 德清 (Ming), author of Zhuangzi neipian zhu 莊子內篇注 (4 juan). (Shi) Hanshan Deqing (释)憨山德清 (1546-1623), one of the Four Eminent Monks of the Wanli Era

Ding Zhancheng
Ding Zhancheng 丁展成, author of Zhuangzi yinyi yi 莊子音義繹 (1 juan).

Dong Maoce
Dong Maoce 董懋策 (Ming), author of Zhuangzi yi pingdian 莊子翼評點 (8 juan).

Dushu zazhi
Dushu zazhi 读书杂志 / 讀書雜誌 (Miscellaneous Notes on the Classics) by Wang Niansun 王念孫 (1744–1832), with a section Zhuangzi.

Du Zhuang xiaoyan
Du Zhuang xiaoyan 读庄小言 / 讀莊小言 (1 juan), by Wen Deyi 文德翼 ((Ming/Qing dynasty).

Du Zhuangzi
Du Zhuangzi 读庄子, by Wang Shizhen (1526–1590).

Du Zhuangzi pingyi
Du Zhuangzi pingyi 读庄子平议, commentary by Yu Yue 俞樾.

Du Zhuangzi Tianxia pian shuji
Du Zhuangzi Tianxia pian shuji 读庄子天下篇疏记, commentary by Qian Jibo 钱基博.

Du Zhuangzi zhaji (Tao Hongqing)
Du Zhuangzi zhaji 读庄子札记 / 讀莊子札記 (1 juan), notes on the Zhuangzi by Tao Hongqing 陶鸿庆 / 陶鴻慶 (Qing).

Du Zhuangzi zhaji (Zhu Jingzhao)
Du Zhuang zhaji 讀莊劄記 (1 juan), by Zhu Jingzhao 朱景昭 (Qing dynasty).

Dunhuang Fragmentary Zhuangzi Manuscripts
Dunhuang Fragmentary Zhuangzi Manuscripts (Dunhuang canjuan 敦煌残卷), both the Dunhuang Baozang (敦煌宝藏 / 敦煌寶藏) and the Dunhuang Daozang (敦煌道藏) include Zhuangzi texts; high-resolution original images can also be viewed through the International Dunhuang Project (IDP). - See also Stein collection (S.), Pelliot collection (P.), etc. - See also Teraoka Ryûgan.

Dunhuang Tang dynasty manuscript
Dunhuang Tang dynasty manuscript (Dunhuang Tang xieben 敦煌唐写本), a Zhuangzi manuscript in the Guo Xiang version from Dunhuang 敦煌.

=== E ===
ECT
ECT = Loewe, Michael (1993). Early Chinese Texts: A Bibliographical Guide. Berkeley: The Society for the Study of Early China and the Institute of East Asian Studies. OCLC 1348979043.

=== F ===
Fang Qian
Fang Qian 方潛, author of Nanhua jingjie 南華經解 (3 juan).

Fang Xuming
Fang Xuming 方虛名 (Ming), author of Nanhua zhenjing pangzhu 南華真經旁注

Fang Yizhi
Fang Yizhi 方以智 (1611–1671), scholar, Buddhist monk; author of Yaodi pao Zhuang 药地炮庄.

Fang Yong
Fang Yong 方勇 (b. 1956), author of Zhuangzi xueshi 莊子學史 (History of Zhuangzi studies). 3 vols. Renmin chubanshe, Beijing 2008 (first edition; later expanded and revised).

Fei Zhuang lun
Fei Zhuang lun 废庄论 / 廢莊論 ("Critique of Zhuangzi") by Wang Tanzhi 王坦之 (330-375), Eastern Jin dynasty.

Feng Mengzhen
Feng Mengzhen 馮夢禎 (Ming), author of Nanhua zhenjing chongjiao 南華真經重校 (8 juan).

Fudan daxue xuebao bianjibu
Fudan daxue xuebao bianjibu 复旦大学学报编辑部: Zhuangzi yanjiu taolunji 庄子研究讨论集 (Fudan daxue chubanshe 复旦大学出版社, Shanghai 1986).

Fu Shan
Fu Shan 傅山 (Qing), author of Zhuangzi jie 庄子解 / 莊子解 (1 juan).

Fukunaga Mitsuji
Fukunaga Mitsuji 福永光司 (1918-2001); Sôshi 庄子 (Tokyo 1956); Sôshi gaihen 庄子外篇 (Tokyo 1966); Sôshi zappen 庄子杂篇 (Tokyo 1967).

=== G ===
Gan Hui
Gan Hui 甘暉 (fl. 741), Daoist.

Gao Heng
Gao Heng 高亨, author of Zhuangzi jinjian 莊子今箋; Zhuangzi xinjian 莊子新箋 (1 juan).

Gao Qiuyue
Gao Qiuyue 高秋月, author of Zhuangzi shiyi 莊子釋意 (3 juan).

Gong Lequn
Gong Lequn 龚乐群: Lao-Zhuang yitong 老庄异同 (Taibei 台北: Youshi wenhua shiye gongsi 幼狮文化事业公司, 1974); Zhuangzi yaoyi 庄子要义 (Taibei 台北: Taiwan Zhonghua shuju 台湾中华书局, 1983).

Gu-jin Nanhua neipian jianglu
Gu-jin Nanhua neipian jianglu 古今南华内篇讲录 / 古今南華內篇講錄 (10 juan) (cf. SKDCD).

Gu Shi
Gu Shi 顾实, author of Zhuangzi Tianxia pian jiangshu 庄子天下篇讲疏. Shanghai 上海: Shangwu yinshuguan 商务印书馆, 1928 (first edition).

Guyi congshu
Guyi congshu (simplified Chinese: 古逸丛书; traditional Chinese: 古逸叢書; Wade–Giles: Ku-i ts'ung-shu, "Collectanea of ancient lost books") is a congshu, compiled by Li Shuchang 黎庶昌 (1837–1897) in the years 1882–84, it includes 26 books with a total size of 198 juan. The Southern Song period (1127–1279) edition of the book Zhuangzi, belonging to the textual type of Zhuangzi commentaries that includes the Guo Xiang commentary (Guo Xiang zhu 郭象注) and the Cheng Xuanying sub-commentary (Cheng Xuanying shu 成玄英疏), is reproduced in the Guyi congshu and titled Nanhua zhenjing zhushu 南华真经注疏. This edition formed the basis for the annotated edition Zhuangzi jishi 庄子集释 by Guo Qingfan 郭庆藩, published in the 21st year of the Guangxu era (1895) by Sixian shuju 思贤书局. It was used for the Harvard-Yenching Sinological Index and later appeared, among others, in Zhonghua shuju (Beijing 1961).

Guan Feng
Guan Feng 关锋 / 關鋒 (Kuan Fung), scholar; author of Zhuangzi neipian yijie he pipan 庄子内篇译解和批判 (Beijing: Zhonghua shuju, 1961).

Guan Lao-Zhuang yingxiang lun
Guan Lao-Zhuang yingxiang lun 观老庄影响论 / 觀老莊影響論 (1 juan), by (Ming) Shi Deqing 釋德清 (Hanshan Deqing).

Guang Fei Zhuang lun
Guang Fei Zhuang lun 广废庄论 / 廣廢莊論, by Li Xi 李磎 (Tang dynasty). - See also Fei Zhuang lun 废庄论 / 廢莊論.

Gui Youguang
Gui Youguang 归有光 / 歸有光 (1506–1571) (Ming), co-author of Nanhua jing pingzhu 南華經評注 (10 juan); author of Zhuangzi shiyi 庄子释意; Nanhua zhenjing pingzhu 南华真经评注.

Guo Jie
Guo Jie 郭階 (Qing dynasty), author of Zhuangzi shixiao 莊子識小 (1 juan).

Guo Lianghan
Guo Lianghan 郭良翰, author of Nanhua jing huijie 南華經薈解.

Guo Qingfan
Guo Qingfan 郭庆藩 / 郭慶藩 Guō Qìngfān / Kuo Ch‘ing-fan (1844–1896), Qing scholar; author of Zhuangzi jishi 庄子集释 / 莊子集釋 (Collected Explanations of the Zhuangzi) (10 juan).

Guo Songtao
Guo Songtao 郭嵩燾 (1818–1891), diplomat, statesman; Guo Songtao quanji 郭嵩焘全集; his comments on Zhuangzi are often quoted by Guo Qingfan in the Zhuangzi jishi.

Guo Xiang
Guo Xiang 郭象 [Kuo Hsiang] (252–312), scholar and official, philosopher; author of Zhuangzi zhu 庄子注, i.e. the editor of the transmitted version of the Zhuangzi, in which he reduced the then-existing 52 chapters to the 33 chapters known today and added his commentary (see also Wei Mou edition (in 29 chapters) and Liu An edition (in 52 chapters)).

Guo Xiang Zhuangzi zhu jiaoji
Guo Xiang Zhuangzi zhu jiaoji 郭象庄子注校记, by Wang Shumin 王叔岷 (Shanghai: Shangwu yinshuguan, 1950).

Guo Xiang Zhuangxue pingyi
Guo Xiang Zhuangxue pingyi 郭象庄学平议, study on Guo Xiang's interpretation of the Zhuangzi by Su Xinrong 苏新鋈. Taibei 台北: Taiwan xuesheng shuju 台湾学生书局, 1980.

Guozijian editions
Guozijian editions (1007 / 1123), i.e. a) the edition of the Zhuangzi Nanhua zhenjing 莊子南華真經 official published in 1007 by the Guozijian (國子監), a print, which remains the earliest printed version of the Zhuangzi. In the year 1084 the Daoist Chen Jingyuan 陳景元 produced the Nanhua zhenjing quewu 南華真經闕誤, and in 1123 the Guozjian produced b) a revised Zhuangzi Nanhua zhenjing taking account of Chen Jingyuan’s textual criticism. This latter edition has become the standard editio princeps of the text. According to Harbsmeier & Williams it was at this point that the Zhuangzi „became a printed object of historical philology“. (Christoph Harbsmeier & John R. Williams: The Inner Chapters of the Zhuangzi: With copious annotations from the Chinese commentaries. Lun Wen - Studien zur Geistesgeschichte und Literatur in China 27. Harrassowitz Verlag 2024, p. 23 - for the whole section)

Guo Zixuan
Guo Zixuan 郭子玄, see Guo Xiang 郭象 [Kuo Hsiang] (252–312), zi: Zixuan 子玄.

=== H ===
Hanshan Deqing
(Shi) Hanshan Deqing (释)憨山德清 (1546-1623), also Shi Deqing 释德清, one of the Four Eminent Monks of the Wanli Era, author of Zhuangzi neipian zhu 庄子内篇注 (4 juan).

Hanshu
Hanshu (30, p. 1730), lists the Zhuangzi in 52 pian.

Han Jing
Han Jing 韓敬 (Ming), author of Zhuangzi hubai 莊子狐白 (4 juan).

He Tuo
He Tuo 何妥, author of Zhuangzi yishu 庄子义疏 / 莊子義疏, 4 juan.

Hong Yi
Hong Yi 洪頤, author of Zhuangzi conglu 莊子叢錄 (1 juan).

Hu Fang
Hu Fang 胡方, author of Zhuangzi bianzheng 莊子辯正 (6 juan).

Hu Huaichen
Hu Huaichen 胡怀琛 / 胡懷琛 (1886–1938), scholar of the late Qing/Republic period; author of Zhuangzi jijie buzheng 庄子集解补正 / 莊子集解補正 (1 juan).

Hu Wenying
Hu Wenying 胡文英, scholar; author of Zhuangzi dujian 庄子独见.

Hu Yuanjun
Hu Yuanjun 胡远濬 / 胡遠濬 (1866–1931), scholar; author of Zhuangzi quangu 庄子诠诂.

Hu Zhefu
Hu Zhefu 胡哲敷, scholar; author of Lao-Zhuang zhexue 老庄哲学.

Huang Hongxian
Huang Hongxian 黃洪憲 (Ming), author of Zhuangzi Nanhua wensui 莊子南華文髓 (7 juan).

Huang Huazhen
Huang Huazhen 黄华珍 / 黃華珍: Zhuangzi yinyi yanjiu 庄子音义研究 / 莊子音義研究 (Zhonghua shuju, Beijing 1999).

Huang Yuanbing
Huang Yuanbing 黃元炳, author of Zhuangzi xinshu 莊子新疏 (Republic).

Huang Zhengwei
Huang Zhengwei 黃正位, author of Zhuangzi nanhua zhenjing jiaoding 莊子南華真經校訂 (8 juan).

=== I ===
Indexes
Zhuangzi yinde 莊子引得 (A concordance to Chuang Tzu); Harvard-Yenching Institute Sinological Index series no. 20. Peking, 1947, compiled by Qi Sihe 齊思和 (b. 1907); based on an early reprint of Guo Qingfan's edition, without correction of copyist's errors.
A Concordance to the Zhuangzi 莊子逐字索引, ed. D. C. Lau and Chen Fong Ching; ICS series, Hong Kong: Shangwu 2000.

See also Lao-Zhuang cidian 老庄词典, Wang Shishun 王世舜, Han Mujun 韩慕君 (eds.). Shandong jiaoyu chubanshe 山东教育出版社, 1993.

=== J ===
Jia Shanxiang
Jia Shanxiang 賈善翔, scholar; author of Nanhua zhenjing zhiyin 南华真经直音.

Jianwen, Emperor of Liang
Jianwen, Emperor of Liang 梁簡文帝 (501–551), third son of Emperor Wu, wrote a commentary in 20 scrolls (梁简文帝大宝年，御制《庄子义》二十卷。). The text is lost; fragments are preserved in the Zhuangzi yinyi by Lu Deming.

Jiangnan
Jiangnan guzang ben 江南古藏本 [Old Zhuangzi edition from Jiangnan].

Jiang Youhao
Jiang Youhao 江有誥 (Qing), author of Zhuangzi yundu 莊子韻讀 (1 juan).

Jiang Xichang
Jiang Xichang 蒋锡昌 (1897-1974), scholar; author of Zhuangzi zhexue 庄子哲学.

Jiang Yu
Jiang Yu 江遹 (11th c.), Song dynasty scholar, commentator on the Liezi.

Jiao Hong
Jiao Hong 焦竑 / 焦竤 (1540–1620), (Ming) philologist; author of Zhuangzi yi fu Chen Jingyuan quewu 莊子翼附錄陳景元闕誤 (3 juan) and Zhuangzi yi 庄子翼 / 莊子翼 ("Wings to the Zhuangzi") (8 juan).

Jie Zhuang
Jie Zhuang 解庄 / 解莊 (12 juan), by Tao Wangling 陶望齡 (Ming dynasty)

Jin dynasty Zhuangzi commentaries
Jin dynasty Zhuangzi commentaries; five commentaries of the Jin period, by Sima Biao, Mr. Meng (Meng shi 孟氏), Xiang Xiu, Li Yi and Cui Zhuan focussed more closely on the text but they survive only in indirect testimony.

Jin Shengtan
Jin Shengtan 金圣叹 (1608—1661) "Six Works of Genius" 六才子书 / 六才子書; Liùcái zǐshū (the Zhuangzi, the poem Li Sao, Shiji, Du Fu's poems, Romance of the Western Chamber, and the Water Margin).

Jingdian shiwen
Jingdian shiwen 经典释文 / 經典釋文 Jīngdiăn shìwén, Ching-tien shih-wen, by Lu Deming 陆德明 / 陸德明 [Lu Te-ming], whose section on the Zhuangzi is sometimes published separately as the Zhuangzi wenju yi 庄子文句义.

=== K ===
Kanō Naoki
Kanō Naoki 狩野直喜 (1868-1947), published the Kōzan-ji Zhuangzi Manuscript in Kyū shō kansuhon Sōshi zankan kō kan ki 舊鈔卷子本莊子殘卷校勘記 (Tōkyō: Tōhō bunka gakuin, 1932). In this edition, the text was collated with several major Song and Ming dynasty versions.

Kōzan-ji Zhuangzi Manuscript
Kōzan-ji Zhuangzi Manuscript (日本高山寺旧钞卷子本庄子残卷, Rìběn Gāoshān Sì jiù chāo juànzǐ běn Zhuāngzǐ cánjuàn or 日本高山寺古钞本 Rìběn Gāoshān Sì gǔ chāoběn, etc.), old and incomplete Muromachi-period (1392–1568) manuscripts, preserved at the Kōzan-ji 高山寺, a Buddhist monastery near Kyoto, Japan, regarded as an important textual witness to early commentarial traditions. It is an Yuan dynasty manuscript of the Guo Xiang version of the Zhuangzi, with a postface by Guo Xiang (in later Chinese Yuan editions, it was removed). - See also Kanō Naoki 狩野直喜, Takeuchi Yoshio 武内義雄, Wang Shumin 王叔岷.

=== L ===
Lang Qingxiao
Lang Qingxiao 郎擎霄, scholar; author of Zhuangzi xue'an 庄子学案.

Lao-Zhuang cidian
Lao-Zhuang cidian 老庄词典, Wang Shishun 王世舜, Han Mujun 韩慕君 (eds.). Shandong jiaoyu chubanshe 山东教育出版社, 1993.

Lao-Zhuang sixiang lunji
Lao-Zhuang sixiang lunji 老庄思想论集, collected essays on Laozi–Zhuangzi philosophy by Wang Yu 王煜 (Taibei 台北: Lianjing chuban shiye gongsi 联经出版事业公司, 1979).

Lao-Zhuang sixiang sujiang
Lao-Zhuang sixiang sujiang 老庄思想粹讲, by Chen Zhiqing 陈知青 (Taibei 台北: Dingyuan wenhua shiye gongsi 顶渊文化事业公司, 1989).

Lao-Zhuang sixiang yu Xifang zhexue
Lao-Zhuang sixiang yu Xifang zhexue 老庄思想与西方哲学, comparative study of Laozi–Zhuangzi thought and Western philosophy by Song Zhiqing 宋稚青 (Taibei 台北: Sanmin shuju 三民书局, 1968 (First ed.), 1984 (Fourth ed.)).

Lao-Zhuang xinlun
Lao-Zhuang xinlun 老庄新论, study of Laozi–Zhuangzi thought by Chen Guying 陈鼓应 (Shanghai 上海: Shanghai guji chubanshe 上海古籍出版社, 1992).

Lao-Zhuang yanjiu
Lao-Zhuang yanjiu 老庄研究, study of Laozi–Zhuangzi thought by Lu Yongpin 陆永品 (Zhengzhou 郑州: Zhongzhou guji chubanshe 中州古籍出版社, 1984).

Lao-Zhuang yanjiu
Lao-Zhuang yanjiu 老庄研究, by Li Taifen 李泰棻 (Renmin chubanshe, Beijing 1958).

Lao-Zhuang yitong
Lao-Zhuang yitong 老庄异同, comparative study of Laozi and Zhuangzi by Gong Lequn 龚乐群 (Taibei 台北: Youshi wenhua shiye gongsi 幼狮文化事业公司, 1974).

Lao-Zhuang zhexue
Lao-Zhuang zhexue 老庄哲学 ("Philosophy of Laozi and Zhuangzi"), philosophical study by Hu Zhefu 胡哲敷 (Zhonghua shuju, 1962).

Laozi qi ren qi shu ji qi daolun
Laozi qi ren qi shu ji qi daolun 老子其人其书及其道论, by Zhan Jianfeng 詹剑锋 (Hubei renmin chubanshe, Wuhan 1982).

Laozi yu Zhuangzi
Laozi yu Zhuangzi 老子与庄子, comparative study by Chen Zhu 陈柱.

Li Chong
Li Chong 李充: Shi Zhuangzi lun 释庄子论, 2 juan (lost).

Li Guangjin
Li Guangjin 李光縉 (1549–1623), Quanzhou school of Cheng-Zhu thought, author of Nanhua fujie 南华肤解 (Ming dynasty).

Li Gui
Li Gui 李轨, author of Zhuangzi zhu yin 庄子注音 (lost).

Li Hanguang
Li Hanguang 李含光 (683–769), Daoist master.

Li Hongfan
Li Hongfan 李弘範, 4th c. scholar.

Li Mian
Li Mian 李勉, author of Zhuangzi zonglun ji fenpian pingzhu 莊子總論及分篇評注 (Taiwan shangwu yinshuguan, Taibei 1973).

Li Rong
Li Rong 李榮 (7th c.), Daoist master.

Li Shan
Li Shan 李善 (d. 689), commentary to the Wenxuan (Harold D. Roth: "two essays on the Chuang tzu which survive only in small fragments in Li Shan's (d. 689) 李善 commentary to the Wen hsüan are attributed to Liu An"). - See also Liu An edition.

Li Shibiao
Li Shibiao 李士表, Southern Song dynasty: Zhuang-Lie shilun 莊列十論 ("Ten Essays on Zhuangzi and Liezi") or Zhuangzi jiulun 庄子九论 ("Nine Discussions of Master Zhuang"), lost. Cited by Chu Boxiu 褚伯秀 (Southern Song dynasty) in his Nanhua zhenjing yihai zuanwei 南华真经义海纂微).

Li Shuzhi
Li Shuzhi 李叔之: Zhuangzi yishu 庄子义疏 (lost).

Li Taifen
Li Taifen 李泰棻, scholar; author of Lao-Zhuang yanjiu 老庄研究 (Renmin chubanshe, Beijing 1958).

Li Tengfang
Li Tengfang 李騰芳, see Li Xiangzhou.

Li Tingji
Li Tingji 李廷機 (Ming), co-author of Zhuangzi xuanyan pingyuan 莊子玄言評苑 (3 juan).

Li Xi
Li Xi 李磎, Tang dynasty, Guang Fei Zhuang lun 广废庄论 / 廣廢莊論 (see also Fei Zhuang lun 废庄论).

Li Xiangzhou
Li Xiangzhou 李湘州 (Li Tengfang 李騰芳) (1573–1633), scholar, Confucian.

Li Yi
Li Yi 李颐 / 李頤 (died 335), early commentator before Guo Xiang. He wrote a commentary in 30 scrolls on 30 chapters which is lost; fragments are found in the Zhuangzi yinyi by Lu Deming.

Li Ze
Li Ze 李赜 / 李賾, scholar.

Li Zhi
Li Zhi 李贽 / 李贄 (1527–1602), (Ming) novelist, Neo-Confucian; author of Zhuangzi jie 莊子解 (2 juan).

Liang Qichao
Liang Qichao 梁啓超, author of Zhuangzi Tianxia pian shiyi 莊子天下篇釋義 (Late Qing and Early Republican Period).

Liao Ping
Liao Ping 廖平 (1852-1932), Zhuangzi xinjie 莊子新解.

Liezi
Liezi 列子 (Sayings of Master Lie), Daoist text, edition Sibu congkan 四部叢刊 (Commercial Press, Shanghai). - See also Liezi zhu (Liezi Commentary).

Liezi chapters
Liezi chapters: 1 Tian Rui 天瑞 Heaven’s Gifts, 2 Huang Di 黃帝 The Yellow Emperor, 3 Zhou Mu Wang 周穆王 King Mu of Zhou, 4 Zhong Ni 仲尼 Confucius, 5 Tang Wen 湯問 The Questions of Tang, 6 Li Ming 力命 Endeavor and Destiny, 7 Yang Zhu 楊朱 Yang Zhu, 8 Shuo Fu 說符 Explaining Conjunctions (The Book of Lieh-tzǔ: A Classic of Tao. Translated by A. C. Graham. New York: Columbia University Press. 1990 [1960]. ISBN 0-231-07237-6)

Liezi zhu
Liezi zhu 列子注 (Liezi Commentary), by Zhang Zhan 張湛 (Wei-Jin), includes fragments from the (selective) commentary Zhuangzi zhu 庄子注 by Xiang Xiu 向秀 (Wei-Jin), which his is lost.

Lin Congshun
Lin Congshun 林聪舜, author of Xiang Guo Zhuangxue zhi yanjiu 向郭庄学之研究 (Wenshizhe chubanshe 文史哲出版社, Taibei 1981).

Lin Xiyi
Lin Xiyi 林希逸 (courtesy name Suweng 肅翁, pseudonym Juanzhai 鬳齋 or Zhuxi 竹溪; ca. 1193—1271), Song dynasty Neo-Confucian scholar; author of Nanhua zhenjing kouyi 南華真經口義 (Zhuangzi kouyi 庄子口义); he deliberately positioned his commentary in contrast to Guo Xiang's version.

Lin Yidu
Lin Yidu 林疑独, see Lin Zi 林自.

Lin Yunming
Lin Yunming 林云铭 / 林雲銘 (1628–1697?), poet, literary critic; Zhuangzi yin 庄子因 / 莊子因.

Lin Zhongyi
Lin Zhongyi 林仲懿, author of Nanhua benyi 南華本義.

Lin Zi
Lin Zi 林自 (zi: Yidu 疑独), Northern Song dynasty, Zhuangzi zhu 庄子注 (now lost). Cited in Nanhua zhenjing yihai zuanwei 南华真经义海纂微 by Chu Boxiu 褚伯秀.

Liu An edition
Liu An edition 刘安版, from the Western Han Dynasty. The Liu-An “complete” edition (Xi Han Liu An ban Zhuangzi daquan ben 西汉刘安版《庄子》大全本) comprised 52 chapters in total. See also Wei Mou edition.

Liu Chenweng
Liu Chenweng 劉辰翁 (1232–1297), (Song) scholar; author of Zhuangzi Nanhua zhenjing dianjiao 庄子南华真经点校 / 莊子南華真經點校 (3 juan).

Liu Fengbao
Liu Fengbao 刘凤苞 / 劉鳳苞 (1826-1905); author of Nanhua xuexin bian 南华雪心编 / 南華雪心編.

Liu Hongdian
Liu Hongdian 刘鸿典, scholar; author of Zhuangzi yuejie 庄子约解 (4 juan).

Liu Shilian
Liu Shilian 劉仕璉, author of Nanhua chundian 南華春點 (8 juan).

Liu Shipei
Liu Shipei 刘师培 / 劉師培 (1884–1919), scholar, revolutionary, and philologist; author of Zhuangzi jiaobu 庄子校补/庄子斠补 (1 juan).

Liu Shuya
Liu Shuya 刘叔雅, see Liu Wendian 刘文典 (1890–1957)

Liu-Song edition
Liu-Song edition, an edition of the time of the Liu-Song dynasty (刘宋), one of the so-called Southern Dynasties in China. Cited in the Zhuangzi yinyi by Lu Deming. - See Southern dynasties Song dynasty Zhuangzi edition of the Yuanjia era.

Liu Wendian
Liu Wendian 刘文典 (1890–1957), philologist of the Republican period; author of Zhuangzi buzheng 庄子补正, Shanghai 1947 (the work served as the basis of the English Zhuangzi translation by Burton Watson).

Liu Wu
Liu Wu 刘武/劉武, Qing scholar; author of Zhuangzi jijie neipian buzheng 庄子集解内篇补正 / 莊子集解內篇補正 (7 juan).

Liu Xianxin
Liu Xianxin 劉咸炘 (1896–1932), scholar, Sichuan University; author of Zhuangzi shizhi 莊子釋滯.

Liu Xiaogan
Liu Xiaogan 刘笑敢: Zhuangzi zhexue ji qi yanbian 庄子哲学及其演变 (Zhongguo shehui kexue chubanshe 中国社会科学出版社, Beijing 1987).

Liu Zong
Liu Zong 柳縱 (fl. 733), Daoist.

Lu Changgeng
Lu Changgeng 陸長庚 (Ming), see Lu Xixing 陆西星 (zi: Changgeng 长庚), author of Nanhua zhenjing fumo 南華真經副墨 (33 juan).

Lu Deming
Lu Deming 陆德明 / 陸德明 [Lu Te-ming] (family name Lu Yuanlang 陸元朗 (556–627 or 581–682 or ca. 550–630), Sui-Tang dynasty scholar and philologist; author of Zhuangzi yinyi 庄子音义 (in: Jingdian shiwen, a collection of explanations on classical texts, wherein he also comments on the Zhuangzi, incorporating fragments from many earlier commentaries).

Lü Huiqing
Lü Huiqing 吕惠卿 / 呂惠卿 (courtesy name Ji Fu 吉甫; 1032–1111), Song dynasty scholar and official, follower of Wang Anshi; author of Zhuangzi yi 庄子义 (in 33 chapters; now lost), interpreting Zhuangzi's critique of Confucius regarding wisdom and ritual norms.

Lu Kejiao
Lu Kejiao 陸可教 (Ming), co-author of Zhuangzi xuanyan pingyuan 莊子玄言評苑 (3 juan).

Lu Qin
Lu Qin 陆钦, scholar; author of Zhuang Zhou sixiang yanjiu 庄周思想研究 (Henan renmin chubanshe, Zhengzhou 1983).

Lu Shuzhi
Lu Shuzhi 陸樹芝 (Qing), author of Nanhua xue 南華雪 (3 juan).

Lu Wenchao
Lu Wenchao 卢文弨 / 盧文弨 (1717-1795), author of Zhuangzi yinyi kaozheng 莊子音義考證.

Lu Xixing
Lu Xixing 陆西星 (1520–1606), zi: Changgeng 长庚; author of Nanhua zhenjing fumo 南華真經副墨 (Nanhua fumo 南华副墨).

Lu Yongpin
Lu Yongpin 陆永品: Lao-Zhuang yanjiu 老庄研究 (Zhongzhou guji chubanshe 中州古籍出版社, Zhengzhou 1984).

Lu Zangyong
Lu Zangyong 盧藏用 (fl. 700), Daoist.

Luo Miandao
Luo Miandao 羅勉道 (pseudonym Zhu Feng 竹峰, died 1367) (Ming), wrote the commentary Nanhua zhenjing xunben 南華真經循本 (Complying with the Original Meaning of the Perfect Scripture of the Southern Cultural Florescence) (30 juan).

Luo Zhenyu
Luo Zhenyu 羅振玉 (Qing), author of Nanhua zhenjing canjuan jiaoji 南華真經殘卷校記 (1 juan).

=== M ===
Ma Lu
Ma Lu 馬魯, author of Nanhua li 南華瀝 (1 juan).

Ma Qichang
Ma Qichang 马其昶 / 馬其昶 (1855–1930), scholar, historian; author of Zhuangzi gu 庄子故.

Ma Xulun
Ma Xulun 马叙伦 / 馬敘倫 (1884–1970), modern scholar; author of Zhuangzi yizheng 庄子义证 and Zhuangzi Tianxia pian shuyi 庄子天下篇述义 (Shanghai: Longmen lianhe shuju, 1958).

Meng shi
Meng shi 孟氏 ("Mr. Meng"), Zhuangzi zhu 庄子注. His commentary is lost; fragments are included in the Zhuangzi yinyi by Lu Deming (see also Sima Biao).

Miao Shanshi
Miao Shanshi 苗善时 (Yuan dynasty), Nanhua jing gong'an 南华经公案, in: Xuanjiao da gong'an 玄教大公案 (Great Public Cases in the Teaching of Mystery) (cases 43–55).

=== N ===
Nanhua benyi
Nanhua benyi 南華本義, by (Qing) Lin Zhongyi 林仲懿.

Nanhua chundian
Nanhua chundian 南華春點 (8 juan), authored by Liu Shilian 劉仕璉.

Nanhua fumo
Nanhua fumo 南华副墨, commentary on the Nanhua zhenjing 南华真经 by Lu Xixing 陆西星.

Nanhua jianchao
Nanhua jianchao 南华简钞 / 南華簡鈔, by Xu Tinghuai 徐廷槐 (Qing dynasty).

Nanhua jing
Nanhua jing 南华经 / 南華經, see Zhuangzi.

Nanhua jing (Shen Rushen)
Nanhua jing 南华经 (16 juan), by Shen Rushen 沈汝绅.

Nanhua jing fayin
Nanhua jing fayin 南華經發隱 (1 juan) by Yang Wenhui 楊文會 (1837–1911).

Nanhua jing huijie
Nanhua jing huijie 南華經薈解 by Guo Lianghan 郭良翰 (Ming dynasty).

Nanhua jing fumo
Nanhua jing fumo 南華經副墨, see Nanhua zhenjing fumo 南華真經副墨 (Nanhua fumo 南华副墨) by Lu Xixing 陆西星 (1520–1606).

Nanhua jing gong'an
Nanhua jing gong'an 南华经公案 by Miao Shanshi 苗善时 (Yuan dynasty), in his Xuanjiao da gong'an 玄教大公案 (Great Public Cases in the Teaching of Mystery) (cases 43–55).

Nanhua jingjie
Nanhua jingjie 南华经解 / 南華經解, commentary on the Nanhua zhenjing 南华真经 by Xuan Ying 宣颖.

Nanhua jingjie
Nanhua jingjie 南华经解 / 南華經解 (3 juan), authored by Fang Qian 方潛.

Nanhua jing shilüe
Nanhua jing shilüe 南華經释略, by Tang Shunzhi 唐順之 (Ming dynasty).

Nanhua jing zhiyin
Nanhua jing zhiyin 南华真经直音, see Nanhua zhenjing zhiyin 南华真经直音, by Jia Shanxiang 賈善翔 (Daozang edition).

Nanhua li
Nanhua li 南華瀝 (1 juan), authored by Ma Lu.

Nanhua miao
Nanhua miao 南華邈 (Zhuangzi miao 庄子邈), by Wen Ruhai 文如海; Daozang edition.

Nanhua quanjing fenzhang jujie
Nanhua quanjing fenzhang jujie 南华全经分章句解/南華全經分章句解, also called Nanhua jing jujie 南华经句解 (4 juan), authored by Chen Rongxuan.

Nanhua jing jujie
Nanhua jing jujie 南华经句解, also called Nanhua quanjing fenzhang jujie 南华全经分章句解 (4 juan), authored by Chen Rongxuan.

Nanhua moxiang ji
Nanhua moxiang ji 南华模象记, by Zhang Shiluo 张世荦, Qing dynasty.

Nanhua pingzhu
Nanhua pingzhu 南华评注, by Zhang Tan 张坦.

Nanhua tong
Nanhua tong 南华通 / 南華通 (7 juan), by Sun Jiagan 孫嘉淦 (1683–1753).

Nanhua xue
Nanhua xue 南華雪 (3 juan), authored by Lu Shuzhi (Qing).

Nanhua xuexin bian
Nanhua xuexin pian 南华雪心编 / 南華雪心編, authored by Liu Fengbao 刘凤苞 / 劉鳳苞 (1826-1905).

Nanhua zhenjing
Nanhua zhenjing 南华真经 / 南華真經 ("True Classic of the Southern Florescence"), alternative title of the Zhuangzi, attested since the Han period.

Nanhua zhenjing benyi
Nanhua zhenjing benyi 南華真經本義 (16 juan), authored by (Ming) Chen Zhi'an.

Nanhua zhenjing benyi fulu
Nanhua zhenjing benyi fulu 南華真經本義附錄 (8 juan), authored by Chen Zhi'an (Ming).

Nanhua zhenjing canjuan jiaoji
Nanhua zhenjing canjuan jiaoji 南華真經殘卷校記 (1 juan), authored by Luo Zhenyu (Qing).

Nanhua zhenjing fumo
Nanhua zhenjing fumo 南華真經副墨 (33 juan) by Lu Xixing 陆西星 (zi: Changgeng 长庚) (1560).

Nanhua zhenjing xinzhuan
Nanhua zhenjing xinzhuan 南华真经新传, by Wang Pang 王雱 (1044–1076), zi: Yuanze 元泽, Northern Song dynasty official.

Nanhua zhenjing kouyi
Nanhua zhenjing kouyi 南华真经口义 / 南華真經口義, by Lin Xiyi 林希逸 (ca. 1193—1271). See Zhuangzi kouyi 庄子口义.

Nanhua zhenjing pangzhu
Nanhua zhenjing pangzhu 南華真經旁注, by Fang Xuming 方虛名.

Nanhua zhenjing quewu
Nanhua zhenjing quewu 南華眞經闕誤, by Chen Jingyuan 陳景元, DZ. - See also Zhuangzi quewu 庄子阙误 / 莊子闕誤, by (Ming) Yang Shen 楊慎.

Nanhua zhenjing xunben
Nanhua zhenjing xunben 南华真经循本 / 南華真經循本 (30 juan), commentary by Luo Miandao 羅勉道.

Nanhua zhenjing yihai zuanwei
Nanhua zhenjing yihai zuanwei 南华真经义海纂微 / 南華真經義海纂微 by Chu Boxiu 褚伯秀 (Southern Song dynasty), according to the Siku tiyao, “this work gathers the teachings of thirteen scholars — Guo Xiang 郭象, Lü Huiqing 吕惠卿, Lin Yidu 林疑独, Chen Xiangdao 陈祥道, Chen Jingyuan 陈景元, Wang Pang 王雱, Liu Gai 刘概, Wu Chou 吴俦, Zhao Yifu 赵以夫, Lin Xiyi 林希逸, Li Shibiao 李士表, Wang Dan 王旦, Fan Yuanying 范元应 — and, according to its own judgment, determines what it calls “my humble opinion” (guanjian 管见).” - Also called Zhuangzi yihai zuanwei 庄子义海纂微.

Nanhua zhenjing zhangju yinyi
Nanhua zhenjing zhangju yinyi 南华真经章句音义 (14 juan), appended the Zhuangzi quewu 庄子阙误, phonological and semantic notes on the Nanhua zhenjing (Zhuangzi) by Chen Jingyuan 陈景元 (Northern Song dynasty) who carried out extensive textual collation and recorded numerous variant readings.

Nanhua zhenjing zhangju yushi
Nanhua zhenjing zhangju yushi 南华真经章句余事 / 南華真經章句餘事, 1 juan, Chen Jingyuan 陈景元 (Song dynasty).

Nanhua zhenjing zhiyin
Nanhua zhenjing zhiyin 南华真经直音, by Jia Shanxiang 賈善翔; Daozang edition.

Nanhua zhenjing zhushu (Southern Song)
Nanhua zhenjing zhushu 南华真经注疏, Southern Song period (1127–1279) edition of the book Zhuangzi, includes the Guo Xiang commentary (zhu) and the Cheng Xuanying sub-commentary (shu), it is reproduced in the Guyi congshu 古逸丛书 / 古逸叢書. This edition formed the basis for the annotated edition Zhuangzi jishi 庄子集释 by Guo Qingfan 郭庆藩 (ZZJC). Zhang Yuanshan says of it: "Overall it remains faithful to Guo Xiang's reverse commentary (fanzhu 反注), with slight revisions in certain sections." (ZZFYB, p. 1110)

Nanhua zhenjing zhushu (Cheng Yining)
Nanhua zhenjing zhushu 南华真经注疏 / 南華真經注疏 (33 juan), authored by Cheng Yining (Ming dynasty).

Nijing zhong de Lao-Zhuang sixiang
Nijing zhong de Lao-Zhuang sixiang 逆境中的老庄思想, by Zhuang Hanzong 庄汉宗 (Hanxin wenhua shiye gongsi 汉欣文化事业公司, Taibei 1990).

=== P ===
persons (commentators in abbreviation, in selection)
CJY = Chen Jingyuan / CXY = Cheng Xuanying / FY = Fang Yong / GF = Guan Feng / GQF = Guo Qingfan / GX = Guo Xiang / LDM = Lu Deming / LFB = Liu Fengbao / LW = Liu Wu / LWD = Liu Wendian / LXY = Lin Xiyi / LYM = Lin Yunming / P. = Paul Pelliot / S. = Aurel Stein / SMB = Sima Biao / WP = Wang Pang / WSM = Wang Shumin / WXQ = Wang Xianqian / XY = Xuan Ying / YLQ = Yang Liuqiao / ZYS = Zhang Yuanshan

Pu Qilong
Pu Qilong (浦起龙) (1679–1762), Zhuangzi chao 庄子钞 (Qing dynasty).

=== Q ===
Qian Chengzhi
Qian Chengzhi 錢澄之 (1612–1692), recluse, Buddhist monk; author of Zhuangzi gu 莊子詁 (7 juan).

Qian Jibo
Qian Jibo 钱基博, scholar; author of Du Zhuangzi Tianxia pian shuji 读庄子天下篇疏记.

Qian Mu
Qian Mu 钱穆: Zhuangzi zuanjian 庄子纂笺 / 莊子纂箋. Taibei 台北: Dongda tushu gongsi 东大图书公司, 1951 (online edition, 2006); Zhuangzi xuanzhu 庄子选注 (Taibei: Zhengzhong shuju 正中书局, 1971); Zhuangzi quanyan 庄子诠言 (Taibei: Taiwan Shangwu yinshuguan 台湾商务印书馆, 1971 (first edition), 1984 (third edition)); Xian-Qin zhuzi xinian 先秦诸子系年 (Chronology of the Pre-Qin Philosophers).

Qin Xiaolu
Qin Xiaolu 秦效鲁, see Qin Yuliu 秦毓鎏 (1879–1937)

Qin Yuliu
Qin Yuliu 秦毓鎏 (1879–1937), alias Qin Xiaolu 秦效鲁, author of Du Zhuang qiongnian lu 读庄穷年录 / 讀莊窮年錄.

Qu Dajun
Qu Dajun 屈大均 (1630–1696), poet, Buddhist monk, one of the Three Masters of Lingnan (岭南三大家, i.e. Qu Dajun 屈大均, Chen Gongyin 陳恭尹, Liang Peilan 梁佩兰).

=== R ===
Ren Jiyu
Ren Jiyu 任繼愈: Zhuangzi tan yuan 莊子探源 (“Exploring the Source of the Zhuangzi”). In: Zhuangzi zhexue taolun ji 莊子哲學討論集 (Monograph of the Discussions on the Philosophy in the Zhuangzi). Zhonghua shuju, Beijing 1962.

Ruan Ji
Ruan Ji 阮籍 [Juan Chi] (courtesy name Sizong 嗣宗, 210–263), one of the Seven Sages of the Bamboo Grove, author of an essay Da Zhuang lun 達莊論 (a discussion on understanding the Zhuangzi).

Ruan Yusong
Ruan Yusong 阮毓崧, author of Zhuangzi jizhu 莊子集註 (5 juan).

=== S ===
Sha Shaohai
Sha Shaohai 沙少海, author of Zhuangzi jizhu 庄子集注 (Guizhou renmin chubanshe 贵州人民出版社, Guiyang 1987).

Shan Yanyi
Shan Yanyi 單晏一, author of Zhuangzi Tianxia pian huishi 莊子天下篇薈釋.

Shen Dehong
Shen Dehong 沈德鴻, author of Zhuangzi xuanzhu 莊子選註.

Shen Jin
Shen Jin 沈津 (Ming), author of Zhuangzi leizuan 莊子類纂 (2 juan).

Shen Rushen
Shen Rushen 沈汝绅, author of Nanhua jing 南华经 (16 juan).

Shen Yiguan
Shen Yiguan 沈一贯 / 沈一貫 (Ming dynasty), zi: Jianwu 肩吾, scholar; author of Zhuangzi tong 庄子通 / 莊子通 (10 juan).

Shi Daosheng
Shi Daosheng 釋道盛 (1592–1659), scholar, Buddhist monk.

Shi Deqing
Shi Deqing 释德清 / 釋德清 (1546–1623), hao: Hanshan 憨山, scholar; author of Zhuangzi neipian zhu 庄子内篇注; Guan Lao-Zhuang yingxiang lun 观老庄影响论 / 觀老莊影響論 (1 juan).

Shidetang
Shidetang 世德堂, the Shidetang edition of the Zhuangzi served according to Harold D. Roth as the basis for 37 subsequent editions, including the Sibu congkan and Sibu beiyao (Harold D. Roth: "Chuang tzu", in: ECT, p. 61). - See also Shidetang liuzi 世德堂六子 ("Six Masters of the Shidetang").

Shijia lun Zhuang
Shijia lun Zhuang 十家论庄 / 十家論莊 (Ten experts talking about Zhuangzi), Hu Daojing 胡道靜, ed. (Shanghai renmin chubanshe, Shanghai 2004). The ten experts are: Hu Shi 胡适, Feng Youlan 冯友兰, Lü Zhenyu 吕振羽, Guo Moruo 郭沫若, Hou Wailu 侯外庐 (and School of the General History of Chinese Thought - Zhongguo sixiang tongshi xuepai 中国思想通史学派), Ren Jiyu 任继愈, Li Taifen 李泰棻, Guan Feng 关锋, Chen Guying 陈鼓应, Zhang Hengshou 张恒寿. (Online)

Shiwen
Shiwen 释文 / 釋文, an abbreviation for Jingdian shiwen (经典释文 / 經典釋文) by Lu Deming.

Shi Xingtong
Shi Xingtong 釋性𣻢 (Ming), author of Nanhua fafu 南華發覆 (8 juan) (1566).

Shi Zhuangzi lun
Shi Zhuangzi lun 释庄子论 (lost), 2 juan, by Li Chong 李充.

short titles
Cheng shu 成疏 = Sub-commentary (shu) by Cheng Xuanying / ECCP = Eminent Chinese of the Ch'ing Period (Arthur W. Hummel, ed.) / Guo zhu 郭注 = Commentary (zhu) by Guo Xiang / Lu Shi 陸释 = Jingdian shiwen 经典释文 by Lu Deming / Quewu 阙误 / 闕誤 = Nanhua zhenjing quewu 南華眞經闕誤 (Chen Jingyuan) / Shiwen 释文 / 釋文 = Jingdian shiwen 经典释文 (Lu Deming) / Shuowen 说文 / 說文 = Shuowen jiezi 说文解字 (Xu Shen) / Yihai = Zhuangzi yihai zuanwei 庄子义海纂微 (Chu Boxiu) / Yulan 御览 / 御覽 = Taiping yulan 太平御览 / Xiang zhu 向注 = Commentary (zhu) by Xiang Xiu / Yinyi 音义 / 音義 = Zhuangzi yinyi 庄子音义 (Lu Deming) / Zuanjian 纂笺 / 纂箋 = Zhuangzi zuanjian (cf. ZZJQ). - See also Abbreviations.

Shuai Yeguang
Shuai Yeguang 帥夜光 (fl. 733), Daoist.

Sibu congkan
Sibu congkan 四部丛刊, large-scale photographic reproduction of classical works in the four traditional categories (jing, shi, zi, ji); the Zhuangzi reproduced therein according to the Shidetang edition (世德堂本).

Siku da cidian
Siku da cidian (abb. SKDCD), see Zhuangzi 庄子, Zhuangzi Guo Xiang zhu 庄子郭象注, Zhuangzi Guo zhu 庄子郭注, Zhuangzi Wangshi zhu 庄子王氏注, Zhuangzi pingyi 庄子平议, Zhuangzi yi 庄子翼, Zhuangzi jijie 庄子集解, Zhuangzi jishi 庄子集释, Zhuangzi diankan 庄子点勘, Zhuangzi jie 庄子解, Zhuangzi zhu 庄子注, Zhuangzi shixiao 庄子识小, Zhuangzi tongyi 庄子通义, Zhuangzi zhaji 庄子札记, Zhuangzi gu 庄子故, Zhuangzi kouyi 庄子口义, Zhuangzi diankan 庄子点勘, Jie Zhuang 解庄, Nanhua jing 南华经, Nanhua jing fumo 南华经副墨, Nanhua pingzhu 南华评注, Nanhua tong 南华通, Nanhua zhenjing 南华真经, Nanhua zhenjing xinzhuan 南华真经新传, Nanhua zhenjing yihai zuanwei 南华真经义海纂微, Nanhua zhenjing kouyi 南华真经口义, Nanhua moxiang ji 南华模象记, Nanhua benyi 南华本义, Nanhua jianchao 南华简抄, Du Zhuang xiaoyan 读庄小言, Yaodi pao Zhuang 药地炮庄, Guan Lao-Zhuang yingxiang lun 观老庄影响论, Gu-jin Nanhua neipian jianglu 古今南华内篇讲录, Du Zhuangzi zhaji 读庄子札记 (SKDCD, pp. 2296-2301).

Siku quanshu
Siku quanshu 四库全书 (Qing dynasty). - See also Appendix: Qinding Siku quanshu 钦定四库全书.

Sima Biao
Sima Biao 司马彪 / 司馬彪 [Ssu-ma Piao] (240–306 or c. 246–306?), historian and philosopher of the Western Jin period; wrote a commentary in 21 scrolls, covering 52 chapters (7 inner, 28 outer, 14 mixed). His commentary is lost; fragments are included in the Zhuangzi yinyi by Lu Deming, and in the Wenxuan zhu 文选注 (a commentary to the anthology Wenxuan) by Li Shan 李善. - See also Sun Pingyi 孫馮翼: Sima Biao Zhuangzi zhu 司馬彪莊子注 (1799).

Sima Biao zhu
Sima Biao zhu 司馬彪注, the Zhuangzi commentary by Sima Biao (Wei Jin).

Sima Biao Zhuangzi zhu
Sima Biao Zhuangzi zhu (Ssu-ma Piao Chuang tzu chu 司馬彪莊子注, 1799), Qing dynasty edition of the Zhuangzi commentary by Sima Biao, see Sun Pingyi (Sun P'ing-i).

Sizi zhenjing
Sizi zhenjing 四子真經 (True Scriptures of the Four Masters): Nanhua zhenjing 南華真經 (Zhuangzi 莊子), Tongxuan zhenjing 通玄真經 (Wenzi 文子), Chongxu zhide zhenjing 沖虛至德真經 (Liezi 列子), Dongling zhenjing 洞靈真經 (Kangcangzi 亢倉子)

Song Lian
Song Lian 宋濂 (1310—1381), Ming dynasty, Zhuangzi bian 庄子辨.

Song Zhiqing
Song Zhiqing 宋稚青: Lao-Zhuang sixiang yu Xifang zhexue 老庄思想与西方哲学. Taibei 台北: Sanmin shuju 三民书局, 1968 (First edition), 1984 (Fourth edition).

Southern dynasties Song dynasty Zhuangzi edition of the Yuanjia era
Southern dynasties Song dynasty (Liu Song) Zhuangzi edition of the Yuanjia 元嘉 era (424-453), now lost. Cited in the Zhuangzi yinyi by Lu Deming.

Su Shi
Su Shi (1037—1101), Northern Song dynasty, Zhuangzi citang ji 庄子祠堂记 / 莊子祠堂記 (Inscription for a Sacrificial Shrine for Zhuangzi).

Su Xinrong
Su Xinrong 苏新鋈: Guo Xiang Zhuangxue pingyi 郭象庄学平议 (Taiwan xuesheng shuju 台湾学生书局, Taibei 1980).

Sun Fengyi
Sun Fengyi, see Sun Pingyi 孙冯翼.

Sun Jiagan
Sun Jiagan 孫嘉淦 (1683–1753), author of Nanhua tong 南华通 / 南華通 (7 juan).

Sun Kuang
Sun Kuang 孫礦 (1543–1613), thinker, Buddhist.

Sun Pingyi
Sun Pingyi 孙冯翼 / 孫馮翼 Sun P'ing-i [fl. 1799], sometimes also read "Sun Fengyi"; compiled the lost Zhuangzi Commentary (Zhuangzi zhu 庄子注) by Sima Biao 司马彪 (240–306) (based on the Wenjingtang congshu 问经堂丛书 edition). This compilation does not use Lu Deming's Shiwen; Sun Pingyi claims that there already exists specialized literature on that work, which scholars can easily consult. Instead, he assembled 114 textual fragments from sources such as the Wenxuan Commentary (zhu), the Taiping yulan 太平御览, the Chuxue ji 初学记, the Yiqiejing yinyi 一切经音义, Yin Jingshun's 殷敬顺 Liezi shiwen 列子释文, the Shiji suoyin 史记索隐, the Guangyun 广韵, and other works; over forty of these texts are identical to those found in Lu Deming's work (according to Guan Feng: Zhuangzi neipian yijie he pipan. Beijing 1961: 370-1).

Sun Simiao
Sun Simiao 孫思邈 (7th c.), medical scholar, Daoist.

Sun Yirang
Sun Yirang 孫詒讓 (Qing), author of Zhuangzi zhayi 莊子札迻 (1 juan).

Sun Yuxiu
Sun Yuxiu 孫毓修 (Republic), author of Zhuangzi zhaji 莊子札記 (1 juan).

Sun Zhicheng
Sun Zhicheng 孫至誠, author of Xiaoyaoyou shi 逍遙遊釋 (Republic)

=== T ===
Takeuchi Yoshio
Takeuchi Yoshio 武内義雄 (1886-1966), author of Sōshi kō 莊子考, Rōshi to Sōshi 老子と莊子 (see Takeuchi Yoshio zenshū 武內義雄全集, Tokyo: Kadokawa, 1979), also of Rôshi genji 老子原始, Tokyo, 1967 (first published Kyōto 1926). - See also Kōzan-ji Zhuangzi Manuscript.

Tan Jiefu
Tan Jiefu 谭戒甫: Zhuangzi Tianxia pian xiaoshi 庄子天下篇校释.

Tang Shunzhi
Tang Shunzhi 唐順之 (Ming dynasty), Nanhua jing shilüe 南華經释略.

Tang Yijie
Tang Yijie 汤一介: Guo Xiang yu Wei Jin xuanxue 郭象与魏晋玄学 (Hubei renmin chubanshe 湖北人民出版社, Wuhan 1983).

Tan Yuanchun
Tan Yuanchun 譚元春 (1586–1637), Ming poet, literary theorist; author of Zhuangzi Nanhua jing ping 莊子南華經評 (3 juan).

Tao Hongqing
Tao Hongqing 陶鸿庆 / 陶鴻慶 (Qing), scholar; author of Du Zhuangzi zhaji 读庄子札记 / 讀莊子札記 (1 juan).

Tao Wangling
Tao Wangling 陶望齡 (1562?-1609), Ming poet, author of Jie Zhuang 解莊 (12 juan).

Taoist Canon
Taoist Canon, see Daozang.

Teraoka Ryûgan
Teraoka Ryûgan 寺岡龍含, author of Tonkô hon Kaku Shô chû Sôshi Nanka shinkyô shûlei 敦煌本郭象注莊子南華真經輯影 (Collection and Facsimiles of the Dunhuang edition of the Zhuangzi – Nanhua Zhenjing annotated by Guo Xiang). Fukui kambun gakkai 福井漢文學會 1960.

Tongzhi
Tongzhi 通志 ('Comprehensive records'), a general knowledge encyclopedia completed in 1161 by Zheng Qiao 鄭樵 (1104-1162) during the Song dynasty.

=== W ===
Wang Anshi
Wang Anshi 王安石 (1021-1086), Northern Song dynasty, Zhuang Zhou lun 庄周论.

Wang Chuanshan
Wang Chuanshan 船山王, see Wang Fuzhi 王夫之 (1619–1692).

Wang Fuzhi
Wang Fuzhi 王夫之 (1619–1692), philosopher, Confucian; author of Zhuangzi jie 庄子解 and Zhuangzi tong 庄子通.

Wang Jixian
Wang Jixian 王繼賢 (Ming), co-author of Gumeng Zhuangzi jiaoshi 古蒙莊子校釋 (4 juan).

Wang Kaiyun
Wang Kaiyun 王闓运 / 王闓運 (1833–1916), Qing scholar; author of Zhuangzi zhu 庄子注; Zhuangzi neipian zhu 莊子內篇注 (2 juan).

Wang Niansun
Wang Niansun 王念孫 (1744–1832), Qing dynasty textual critic and scholar, author of Zhuangzi zazhi 莊子雜志 (1 juan). Father of the philologist Wang Yinzhi 王引之 (1766–1834).

Wang Pang
Wang Pang 王雱 (1044–1076), zi: Yuanze 元泽, Northern Song dynasty official, son of Wang Anshi; authored the Nanhua zhenjing shiyi 南華真經拾遺, explaining the underlying meaning of the Zhuangzi, which is rooted in the Dao and restores human innate nature. Author of Nanhua zhenjing xinzhuan 南华真经新传.

Wang Shishun
Wang Shishun 王世舜: Zhuangzi yizhu 庄子译注. Jinan 济南: Shandong jiaoyu chubanshe 山东教育出版社, 1984.

Wang Shizhen
Wang Shizhen (1526–1590), Du Zhuangzi 读庄子.

Wang Shumin
Wang Shumin 王叔岷 (1914—2008), scholar; author of Guo Xiang Zhuangzi zhu jiaoji 郭象庄子注校记 (Shanghai: Shangwu yinshuguan, 1950). ZZFYB is using his following works: Zhuangzi jiaoshi 庄子校释 (1947), Zhuangzi jiaoquan 庄子校诠 (Taibei 台北 1988, including the appendix Zhuangzi yiwen 庄子佚文), Zhuangzi jiaoquan 庄子校诠 (Zhonghua Shuju 中华书局 2007, without the appendix Zhuangzi yiwen 庄子佚文, later included in Zhonghua Shuju 中华书局 2007 Zhuangxue guankui 庄学管窥). The scope of citations is historically unparalleled. Zhuangxue guankui 庄学管窥 (Taibei 台北 1999, Zhonghua Shuju 中华书局 2007), Zhuzi jiaozheng 诸子斠证 (Taibei 台北 196, Zhonghua Shuju 中华书局 2007), Xian Qin daofa sixiang jianggao 先秦道法思想讲稿 (Taibei 台北 1992, Zhonghua Shuju 中华书局 2007), Tao Yuanming shi jianzheng gao 陶渊明诗笺证稿 (Taibei 台北 1975, Zhonghua Shuju 中华书局 2007).

Wang Tanzhi
Wang Tanzhi 王坦之 (330-375), Fei Zhuang lun 废庄论 / 廢莊論 ("Critique of Zhuangzi") (Eastern Jin).

Wang Xianqian
Wang Xianqian 王先谦 / 王先謙 (1842–1917), scholar of the late Qing period; author of Zhuangzi jijie 庄子集解.

Wang Xiaoyu
Wang Xiaoyu 王孝鱼 / 王孝魚 (1900—1981): Zhuangzi neipian xinjie 庄子内篇新解. Changsha 长沙: Yuelu shushe 岳麓书社, 1983.

Wang Xuan
Wang Xuan 王宣 (1565–1654), scientist.

Wang Yinglin
Wang Yinglin 王应麟 (1223—1296), Southern Song dynasty, Kunxue jiwen 困学纪闻 (Record from Arduous Studio). In its juan 10 - Zhuangzi yipian 庄子逸篇 (Lost Chapters of the Zhuangzi) - are compiled 39 passages of the Zhuangzi from the works Shishuo xinyu 世说新语, Wenxuan 文选, Hou Hanshu 后汉书, Yiwen leiju 艺文类聚, Taiping yulan 太平御览. This marks the beginning of the collection of lost Zhuangzi texts.

Wang Yinzhi
Wang Yinzhi 王引之 (1766–1834), Qing dynasty philologist, the son of Wang Niansun, he was the author of the Jingzhuan shici 經傳釋詞.

Wang Yu
Wang Yu 王煜: Lao-Zhuang sixiang lunji 老庄思想论集 (Lianjing chuban shiye gongsi 联经出版事业公司, Taibei 1979).

Wang Yuanze
Wang Yuanze 王元泽 / 王元澤, see Wang Pang 王雱.

Wei Bao
Wei Bao 魏包 (fl. 741), Daoist official.

Wei-Jin
Wei-Jin 魏晋 / 魏晉 Wèi-Jìn Wei-Jin period (220-420). See Sima Biao, Meng, Cui Zhuan, Xiang Xiu.

Wei Mou edition
Wei Mou edition 魏牟版, the lost “original” Zhuangzi from the Warring States (Zhanguo Wei Mou ban Zhuangzi chushi ben 战国魏牟版《庄子》初始本, or simply Wei Mou ban chushi ben 魏牟版初始本), is said to have had 7 chapters of the Inner Chapters (Neipian) and 22 chapters of the Outer Chapters (Waipian), i.e., 29 chapters in total. Citations from the time of the Warring States (Xunzi, Han Feizi, Lüshi chunqiu) and early Western Han (before Liu An): Jia Yi, Han Ying (Hanshi waizhuan) (cf. ZZFYB). - See also Liu An edition.

Wen Deyi
Wen Deyi 文德翼 (Ming/Qing dynasty), author of Du Zhuang xiaoyan 读庄小言 / 讀莊小言 (1 juan) (cf. SKDCD).

Wen Kuangzhai
Wen Kuangzhai 聞匡齋, i.e. Wen Yiduo 闻一多 (1899-1946), author of Zhuangzi neipian jiaoshi 莊子內篇校釋 (1 juan).

Wen Ruhai
Wen Ruhai 文如海 (fl. 741), Daoist official; author of Nanhua miao 南華邈 (Zhuangzi miao 莊子邈).

Wenxuan commentary
Wenxuan zhu 文选注 (a commentary to the anthology Wenxuan) by Li Shan 李善.

Wen Yiduo
Wen Yiduo 闻一多 / 聞一多 (1899-1946), leading poet of the 1920s, martyred by Kuomintang right-wingers for criticizing the government; author of Zhuangzi neipian jiaoshi 莊子內篇校釋.

Wen Zhenmeng
Wen Zhenmeng 文震孟 (Ming), co-author of Nanhua jing pingzhu 南華經評注 (10 juan).

Wu Boyu
Wu Boyu 吳伯與 (Ming), author of Nanhua jing yinran 南華經因然 (6 juan).

Wu Cheng
Wu Cheng 吳澄 (Yuan dynasty), Zhuangzi neipian dingzheng 莊子內篇訂正 (2 juan).

Wu Chengshi
Wu Chengshi 吳承仕, author of Zhuangzi yinyi bianzheng 莊子音義辨正 (1 juan).

Wuqiubei zhai Zhuangzi jicheng chubian
Wuqiubei zhai Zhuangzi jicheng chubian 無求備齋莊子集成初編, edited by Yan Lingfeng 嚴靈峰 (1972). - See also Appendix.

Wuqiubei zhai Zhuangzi jicheng xubian
Wuqiubei zhai Zhuangzi jicheng xubian 無求備齋莊子集成續編 [74種, 410卷], edited by Yan Lingfeng 嚴靈峰 (1974). - See also Appendix.

Wu Rulun
Wu Rulun 吳汝綸, author of Zhuangzi diankan 莊子點勘.

Wu Tingxu

Wu Tingxu 武廷緒: Zhuangzi zhaji 莊子札記 (3 juan).

Wu Yanxu
Wu Yanxu 武延緒, author of Zhuangzi zhaji 莊子札記 (3 juan).

Wu Yi
Wu Yi 吴怡: Zhuangzi neipian jieyi 庄子内篇解义.

Wu Zongyi
Wu Zongyi 吳宗儀 (Ming), co-author of Gumeng Zhuangzi jiaoshi 古蒙莊子校釋 (4 juan).

=== X ===
Xi Shusheng
Xi Shusheng 席樹聲: Zhuangzi shenyin 莊子審音 (Qing dynasty).

Xi Tong
Xi Tong 奚侗, author of Zhuangzi buzhu 莊子補註 (4 juan).

Xiang Guo Zhuangxue zhi yanjiu
Xiang Guo Zhuangxue zhi yanjiu 向郭庄学之研究, by Lin Congshun 林聪舜 (Taibei 台北: Wenshizhe chubanshe 文史哲出版社, 1981).

Xiang Xiu
Xiang Xiu 向秀 [Hsiang Hsiu] (c. 227–272?), early Jin-dynasty poet, one of the Seven Sages of the Bamboo Grove; an early commentator before Guo Xiang. He commented on 26 chapters of the Zhuangzi (7 inner, about 20 outer). Guo Xiang used Xiang Xiu's commentary in his editorial work. The commentary is lost; fragments are preserved in the Zhuangzi yinyi by Lu Deming.

Xiaoyaoyou shi
Xiaoyaoyou shi 逍遙遊釋, by Sun Zhicheng 孫至誠 (Republic)

Xie Rushao
Xie Rushao 謝汝韶, author of Nanhua zhenjing pijiao 南華真經批校 (4 juan).

Xu Miao
Xu Miao 徐邈 (d. 397), scholar and official, author of the Zhuangzi yin 庄子音, in 3 juan, now lost. Cited in Lu Deming's Jingdian shiwen.

Xu Tinghuai
Xu Tinghuai 徐廷槐 (Qing dynasty), author of Nanhua jianchao 南华简钞 / 南華簡鈔 (cf. SKDCD).

Xu Xianmin
Xu Xianmin 徐仙民, see Xu Miao 徐邈.

Xu Xiao
Xu Xiao 徐曉 (Ming), author of Nanhua richao 南華日抄 (4 juan).

Xuanxue
Xuanxue (simplified Chinese: 玄学; traditional Chinese: 玄學; pinyin: xuánxué; Wade–Giles: hsüan-hsüeh; "Dark Learning"), the rise of it during the Wei and Jin dynasties created the intellectual context in which new commentaries on the Zhuangzi were produced. Jin-dynasty scholars such as Sima Biao, Cui Zhuan, Xiang Xiu, Guo Xiang, and Li Yi authored influential commentaries and annotated editions. With the exception of Guo Xiang's fully preserved commentary, these works survive only in fragments—mainly within Lu Deming's Jingdian shiwen (in the section on phonological and semantic notes to the Zhuangzi) and in citations scattered through other books and literary collections.

Xuan Ying
Xuan Ying 宣颖 / 宣穎 (Qing, fl. 1721), scholar; author of Nanhua jingjie 南华经解 / 南華經解 (Interpretations of the Nanhua Scripture) (33 juan).

=== Y ===
Yan Fu
Yan Fu 嚴復 (1853–1921), scholar, reformer, Peking University; author of Zhuangzi pingdian 莊子評點.

Yan Lingfeng
Yan Lingfeng 严灵峰 / 嚴靈峰 [Ling-Feng Yan] (1903–1999); editor of Wuqiubeizhai Zhuangzi jicheng chubian (無求備齋莊子集成初編, Compilation Commentaries on the Zhuangzi: the First Edition). Taibei: Yiwen Yinshuguan, 1972, and Wuqiubeizhai Zhuangzi jicheng xubian (無求備齋莊子集成續編, Compilation Commentaries on the Zhuangzi: the Sequel Edition). Taipei: Yiwen Yinshuguan, 1974. Author of Zhuangzi yinyi yinshu kaolüe 莊子音義引書考略 (1 juan), Lao Lie Zhuang sanzi yanjiu wenji 老列庄三子研究文集 (Taipei 1965); Daojia sizi xinbian 道家四子新編 (Shangwu yinshuguan, Taibei 1968)

Yan Shigu
Yan Shigu 颜师古/顏師古 (581–645), Hanshu zhu 汉书注.

Yang Liuqiao
Yang Liuqiao 杨柳桥 / 楊柳橋 (1907-1993) (ed. and trans.): Zhuangzi yigu 庄子译诂 / 莊子譯註. Shanghai guji chubanshe 上海古籍出版社, Shanghai 1991.

Yang Mingzhao
Yang Mingzhao 楊明照, author of Zhuangzi jiaozheng 莊子校證 (1 juan).

Yang Qiyuan
Yang Qiyuan 楊起元 (Ming), author of Nanhua jing pinjie 南華經品節 (6 juan).

Yang Shangshan
Yang Shangshan 杨上善, Sui dynasty philosopher and medical scientist.

Yang Shen
Yang Shen 杨慎 / 楊慎 (1488–1559), (Ming) scholar; author of Zhuangzi quewu 庄子阙误 / 莊子闕誤 (1 juan), Zhuangzi jie 庄子解 / 莊子解 (1 juan), and Zhuangzi nanzi 庄子难字.

Yang Shuda
Yang Shuda 杨树达, modern scholar; author of Zhuangzi shiyi 庄子拾遗.

Yang Wenhui
Yang Wenhui 楊文會 (1837–1911), scholar, modernist, Buddhist; author of Nanhua jing fayin 南華經發隱 (1 juan).

Yaodi pao Zhuang
Yaodi pao Zhuang 药地炮庄, commentary on the Zhuangzi by Fang Yizhi 方以智.

Yao Nai
Yao Nai 姚鼐 (Qing), author of Zhuangzi zhangyi 莊子章義 (5 juan).

Ye Bingjing
Ye Bingjing 葉秉敬 (17th c.), philologist, poet.

Ye Guoqing
Ye Guoqing 叶国庆, scholar; author of Zhuangzi yanjiu 庄子研究.

Yiwen leiju
Yiwen leiju 藝文類聚, 100 juan, (Tang) Ouyang Xun 歐陽詢 (et al.; imp. ord.), with Zhuangzi passages.

Yong Zhuang ji
Yong Zhuang ji 詠莊集 (1 juan), by Cheng Congda 程從大 (Qing dynasty).

Yu Chang
Yu Chang 于鬯 (Qing), scholar; author of Zhuangzi jiaoshu 庄子校书 / 莊子校書 (3 juan).

Yupian
Yupian 玉篇, compiled by Gu Yewang 顧野王 (518-581).

Yu Xingwu
Yu Xingwu 于省吾, modern scholar; author of Zhuangzi xinzheng 庄子新证.

Yu Yue
Yu Yue 俞樾 (1821–1907), prominent philologist of the late Qing period; author of Zhuangzi pingyi 庄子平议 / 莊子平議 (3 juan) (Du Zhuangzi pingyi 读庄子平议 in Zhuzi pingyi 诸子评议); author of Zhuangzi renming kao 莊子人名考 (1 juan).

Yuan Hongdao
Yuan Hongdao 袁宏道 (1568–1610), poet, Buddhist monk.

Yuanjia edition
Yuanjia edition (Yuanjia ben 元嘉本), a Zhuangzi edition of the Yuanjia 元嘉 era (424-453) of the Liu Song dynasty, see Southern dynasties Song dynasty Zhuangzi edition of the Yuanjia era. Now lost, cited in the Zhuangzi yinyi by Lu Deming.

=== Z ===
Zhan Jianfeng
Zhan Jianfeng 詹剑锋, scholar; author of Laozi qi ren qi shu ji qi daolun 老子其人其书及其道论 (Hubei renmin chubanshe, Wuhan 1982).

Zhang Binglin
Zhang Binglin 章炳麟 (1869–1936), modern scholar, also Zhang Taiyan; philologist, activist, and modern scholar; author of Zhuangzi jiegu 庄子解故 / 莊子解故 (1 juan).

Zhang Daoxu
Zhang Daoxu 張道緒, author of Zhuangzi xuan 莊子選 (4 juan).

Zhang Hengshou
Zhang Hengshou 张恒寿, scholar; author of Zhuangzi xintan 庄子新探 (Hubei renmin chubanshe, Wuhan 1983).

Zhang Ji
Zhang Ji 张讥 / 張譏: Zhuangzi jiangshu 庄子讲疏 / 莊子講疏, 2 juan (lost) (Zhuangzi neipian yi 莊子內篇義, 12 juan, Zhuangzi waipian yi 莊子外篇義, 20 juan, Zhuangzi zapian yi 莊子雜篇義, 10 juan).

Zhang Jiugai
Zhang Jiugai 張九垓 (761–805?), Daoist master.

Zhang Junfang
Zhang Junfang 张君房, one of the editors of the Da-Song tiangong baozang 大宋天宫宝藏 / 大宋天宮寳藏, the Northern Song Daoist Canon (see also Yunji qiqian).

Zhang Mosheng
Zhang Mosheng 张默生, scholar; author of Zhuangzi xinshi 庄子新释.

Zhang Shiluo
Zhang Shiluo 张世荦, author of Nanhua moxiang ji 南华模象记 (Qing dynasty).

Zhang Shunhui
Zhang Shunhui 张舜徽 (1911-1992), scholar; author of Zhou Qin daolun fawei 周秦道论发微 (Zhonghua shuju, Beijing 1982).

Zhang Siwei
Zhang Siwei 張四維 (Ming dynasty), author of Zhuangzi kouyi buzhu 莊子口義補註.

Zhang Songhui
Zhang Songhui 張松輝, author of Nanhua zhenjing jingyi 南华真经精义; Zhuangzi yiyi kaobian 莊子疑義考辨 (Zhonghua shuju, Beijing 2007).

Zhang Taiyan
Zhang Taiyan 章太炎, see Zhang Binglin 章炳麟 (1869–1936).

Zhang Tan
Zhang Tan 张坦, author of Nanhua pingzhu 南华评注 (SKDCD).

Zhang Yuanshan
Zhang Yuanshan 张远山 / 張遠山 (b. 1963): Zhuangzi fuyuan ben 庄子復原本 (Zhuangzi Restored Edition) 2021, review by David Cowhig.

Zhang Zhan
Zhang Zhan 張湛, Eastern Jin scholar; commentary to the book Liezi 列子.

Zhang Zhao
Zhang Zhao 張昭, author of Zhuangzi buzhu 莊子補註 (10 juan), cited scarceley by (Ming) Jiao Hong in his Zhuangzi yi 庄子翼

Zhang Zhichun
Zhang Zhichun 張之純, author of Zhuangzi jinghua lu 莊子菁華錄 (1 juan).

Zhao Jianyi
Zhao Jianyi 赵谏议 / 趙諫議, author of a Zhuangzi edition, his text edition contains only Guo Xiang's commentary, printed between 1163 and 1190, but based on an edition from the period of the Northern Song dynasty (ECT, p. 60).

Zhao Yifu
Zhao Yifu 赵以夫 / 趙以夫 (1189–1256), poet, master of the Yijing. His Zhuangzi neipian zhu 庄子内篇注 (Commentary on the “Inner Chapters” of the Zhuangzi), now lost, is cited in the Nanhua zhenjing yihai zuanwei 南华真经义海纂微 by Chu Boxiu 褚伯秀 (Southern Song dynasty).

Zhexue yanjiu zazhishe
Zhexue yanjiu zazhishe 《哲学研究》杂志社, publisher of Zhuangzi zhexue taolun ji 庄子哲学讨论集 (Beijing: Zhonghua shuju, 1962), a collection of essays by Feng Youlan, Guan Feng, and other Zhuangzi experts.

Zhengtong Daozang
Zhengtong Daozang 正统道藏 (Shanghai: Shangwu yinshuguan, 1923–1926; Taipei: Yiwen yinshuguan, 1962; reprint of the 1444–1445 edition with supplement of 1607).

Zhi Daolin
Zhi Daolin 支道林, see Zhi Dun 支遁 (314-366), Eastern Jin dynasty.

Zhi Dun
Zhi Dun 支遁 [Chih Tun] (courtesy name Zhi Daolin 道林, 314–366, Eastern Jin dynasty), Buddhist monk and poet, author of a commentary on Chapter 1 (Xiaoyao lun 逍遥论) of the Zhuangzi.

Zhi Weicheng
Zhi Weicheng 支伟成, scholar; author of Zhuangzi jiaoshi 庄子校释.

Zhonghua daozang
Zhonghua Daozang 中華道藏 (Daoist Canon of China), a modern collection of Daoist writings in 49 volumes.

Zhong Xing
Zhong Xing 钟惺 / 鍾惺 (1574—1624), author of Zhuangzi langxuan 庄子嫏嬛, Zhuangzi wengui 庄子文归 (Ming dynasty).

Zhou Hongzheng
Zhou Hongzheng 周宏正, author of Zhuangzi neipian jiangshu 莊子內篇講疏 (lost), 8 juan.

Zhou Jinran
Zhou Jinran 周金然, Qing dynasty scholar.

Zhou Qin daolun fawei
Zhou Qin daolun fawei 周秦道论发微, by Zhang Shunhui 张舜徽 (Zhonghua shuju, Beijing 1982).

Zhu Dezhi
Zhu Dezhi 朱得之 (Ming dynasty), a student of Wang Yangming (Wang Shouren); author of Zhuangzi tongyi 莊子通義 (10 juan).

Zhu Guiyao
Zhu Guiyao 朱桂曜, scholar; author of Zhuangzi neipian zhengbu 庄子内篇证补 (supplementary commentary to the first seven chapters).

Zhu Jihai
Zhu Jihai 朱季海: Zhuangzi guyan 庄子故言 (Zhonghua shuju 中华书局, Beijing 1987).

Zhu Jingzhao
Zhu Jingzhao 朱景昭 (Qing dynasty), author of Du Zhuang zhaji 讀莊劄記 (1 juan).

Zhu Wenxiong
Zhu Wenxiong 朱文熊: Zhuangzi xinyi 莊子新義 (Republic).

Zhu Xi
Zhu Xi 朱熹 (1130–1200), thinker.

Zhuang Hanzong
Zhuang Hanzong 庄汉宗, author of Nijing zhong de Lao-Zhuang sixiang 逆境中的老庄思想 (Taibei 台北: Hanxin wenhua shiye gongsi 汉欣文化事业公司, 1990).

Zhuang-Lie shilun
Zhuang-Lie shilun 莊列十論 ("Ten Essays on Zhuangzi and Liezi"), by Li Shibiao 李士表.

Zhuang-Qu hegu
Zhuang-Qu hegu 庄屈合诂, a critical study by Qian Chengzhi 钱澄之 (see also Qu Yuan 屈原).

Zhuang Zhou lun
Zhuang Zhou lun 庄周论 by Wang Anshi 王安石 (1021-1086), Northern Song dynasty.

Zhuang Zhou sixiang yanjiu
Zhuang Zhou sixiang yanjiu 庄周思想研究, by Lu Qin 陆钦 (Zhengzhou: Henan renmin chubanshe, 1983).

Zhuangzi
Zhuangzi 庄子, classical Daoist text, traditionally attributed to Zhuang Zhou (4th/3rd century BCE); rich in parables and philosophical allegory; divided into Inner, Outer, and Miscellaneous Chapters.

Zhuangzi bian
Zhuangzi bian 庄子辨 by Song Lian 宋濂 (1310—1381), Ming dynasty.

Zhuangzi bianzheng
Zhuangzi bianzheng 莊子辯正 (6 juan), authored by Hu Fang.

Zhuangzi buzheng
Zhuangzi buzheng 庄子补正, philological corrections to the Zhuangzi by Liu Wendian 刘文典; Yunnan renmin chubanshe, 1980. The edition Shanghai 1947 served as the basis of the English Zhuangzi translation by Burton Watson. (→ 莊子補正 - Online)

Zhuangzi buzhu
Zhuangzi buzhu 莊子補註 (4 juan), authored by Xi Tong 奚侗.

Zhuangzi buzhu
Zhuangzi buzhu 莊子補註 (10 juan), authored by Zhang Zhao 張昭,

Zhuangzi chao
Zhuangzi chao 庄子钞 (Qing dynasty), by Pu Qilong 浦起龙 (1679–1762).

Zhuangzi citang ji
Zhuangzi citang ji 庄子祠堂记 / 莊子祠堂記 (Inscription for a Sacrificial Shrine for Zhuangzi), by Su Shi (1037—1101), Northern Song dynasty,

Zhuangzi conglu
Zhuangzi conglu 莊子叢錄 (1 juan), authored by Hong Yi.

Zhuangzi diankan

Zhuangzi diankan 庄子点勘 / 莊子點勘, by Wu Rulun 吳汝綸.

Zhuangzi dujian
Zhuangzi dujian 庄子独见, commentary on the Zhuangzi by Hu Wenying 胡文英.

Zhuangzi fuyuan ben
Zhuangzi fuyuan ben 庄子復原本 (Zhuangzi Restored Edition), by Zhang Yuanshan 张远山 (2021).

Zhuangzi gu
Zhuangzi gu 庄子故, Zhuangzi commentary by Ma Qichang 马其昶.

Zhuangzi gu
Zhuangzi gu 莊子詁 (7 juan), authored by Qian Chengzhi 錢澄之 (1612–1692).

Zhuangzi guyan
Zhuangzi guyan 庄子故言, study/commentary on the Zhuangzi by Zhu Jihai 朱季海 (Zhonghua shuju 中华书局, Beijing 1987).

Zhuangzi Guo zhu
Zhuangzi Guo zhu 庄子郭注, see Zhuangzi zhu 庄子注.

Zhuangzi Guo Xiang zhu
Zhuangzi Guo Xiang zhu 庄子郭象注, see Zhuangzi zhu 庄子注 (Guo Xiang).

Zhuangzi jiaobu
Zhuangzi jiaobu 庄子校补, critical supplements to the Zhuangzi by Liu Shipei 刘师培 (in Liu Shenshu xiansheng yishu 刘申叔先生遗书).

Zhuangzi jiaoquan
Zhuangzi jiaoquan 庄子校诠 / 莊子校詮, by Wang Shumin 王叔岷 / Wang Shu-min (Taipei: Institute of History and Philology, 1988). In this work the author revised and expanded his Zhuangzi jiaoshi 庄子校释/莊子校釋 (Shanghai: Shangwu, 1947), whereby his later textual research was included in the later volume of 1988. He based his research on reliable editions, added critical comments by Qing scholars and included reconstituted redactions of lost fragments of the Zhuangzi, incorporating most of the fragmentary and indirect testimony to the text. (→ 莊子校詮 - Online)

Zhuangzi jiaoshi
Zhuangzi jiaoshi 庄子校释, annotated Zhuangzi commentary by Wang Shumin 王叔岷.

Zhuangzi jiaoshi
Zhuangzi jiaoshi 庄子校释, edition by Zhi Weicheng 支伟成.

Zhuangzi jiaoshu
Zhuangzi jiaoshu 庄子校书 / 莊子校書 (3 juan), authored by Yu Chang 于鬯 (Qing dynasty).

Zhuangzi jiaozheng
Zhuangzi jiaozheng 莊子校證 (1 juan), authored by Yang Mingzhao.

Zhuangzi jicheng
Zhuangzi jicheng 庄子集成 , see Wuqiubei zhai Zhuangzi jicheng 无求备斋庄子集成 (chubian 初编 & xubian 续编). See also Appendix

Zhuangzi jicheng
Zhuangzi jicheng 庄子集成, modern collection edited by Fujian People's Publishing House (Fujian renmin chubanshe 福建人民出版社) (福建人民出版社出版《庄子集成》第一辑)

Zhuangzi jie
Zhuangzi jie 庄子解, commentary on the Zhuangzi by Wang Fuzhi 王夫之.

Zhuangzi jie
Zhuangzi jie 莊子解 (1 juan), authored by Fu Shan (Qing dynasty).

Zhuangzi jiegu
Zhuangzi jiegu 庄子解故 / 莊子解故 (1 juan), philologically critical Zhuangzi commentary by Zhang Binglin; in Zhangshi congshu (章氏丛书).

Zhuangzi jijie
Zhuangzi jijie 庄子集解 / 莊子集解, annotated collection on the Zhuangzi by Wang Xianqian; in the series Zhuzi jicheng 诸子集成, photographic reproduction by Zhonghua shuju. (→ 莊子集解 - Online)

Zhuangzi jijie (Li Yi)
Zhuangzi jijie 庄子集解 / 莊子集解 (Western Jin), by Li Yi 李颐 / 李頤 (died 335). The commentary is now lost, it is cited by Lu Deming (Tang dynasty) in his Zhuangzi yinyi. The commentators of all subsequent dynasties after Li Yi invariably used the edited and abridged version of the Zhuangzi (庄子) by Guo Xiang (郭象) as their base text (cf. ZZFYB, p. 1110).

Zhuangzi jijie buzheng
Zhuangzi jijie buzheng 庄子集解补正 / 莊子集解補正 (1 juan), additions and corrections to existing commentaries; compiled by Hu Huaichen 胡怀琛 / 胡懷琛 (in Puxuezhai congshu 朴学斋丛书 – first series).

Zhuangzi jijie neipian buzheng
Zhuangzi jijie neipian buzheng 庄子集解内篇补正 / 莊子集解內篇補正 (7 juan), critical notes by Liu Wu 刘武 (Qing dynasty). (→ 莊子集解內篇補正 - Online)

Zhuangzi jinzhu jinyi
Zhuangzi jinzhu jinyi 庄子今注今译, modern commentary and translation of the Zhuangzi by Chen Guying 陈鼓应 (Zhonghua shuju 中华书局, Beijing 1983), provides comprehensive and detailed commentary as well as a modern translation of the entire work. It is one of the better popular editions of Zhuangzi. - Online (Beijing 2007, 2 vols.) - The first edition of this book was published in 1974 by the Commercial Press in Taiwan. In 1980, during a research stay at the University of California, Berkeley in the United States, the original edition was extensively revised and then published in 1983 by the Zhonghua Book Company in Beijing. In 1995 it underwent minor revisions and was retypeset by the Commercial Press in Taiwan.) - See also Appendix.

Zhuangzi jishi
Zhuangzi jishi 庄子集释 / 莊子集釋 (Zhuangzi with collected explanations) (10 juan), influential and still fundamental annotated edition of the Zhuangzi by Guo Qingfan 郭庆藩 / 郭慶藩 (Qing); modern editions: ZZJC Vol. 3. Shanghai, 1954 / Zhonghua shuju, 1961. (→ 莊子集釋 - Online)

Zhuangzi jizhu
Zhuangzi jizhu 庄子集注, commentary on the Zhuangzi by Sha Shaohai 沙少海 (Guizhou renmin chubanshe 贵州人民出版社, Guiyang 1987).

Zhuangzi jizhu
Zhuangzi jizhu 莊子集註 (5 juan), authored by Ruan Yusong 阮毓崧.

Zhuangzi jiangshu
Zhuangzi jiangshu 庄子讲疏, in 10 juan, by Emperor Jianwen of Liang (Liang Jianwen di 梁简文帝). The work is lost. It is quoted in Lu Deming's Shiwen. The Benji 本纪 chapter of the Liangshu mentions a Zhuangzi yi 庄子义 in 20 juan, which may possibly be the same work.

Zhuangzi jiaobu
Zhuangzi jiaobu 莊子斠補 (1 juan), authored by Liu Shipei 劉師培 (Qing dynasty).

Zhuangzi jinghua lu
Zhuangzi jinghua lu 莊子菁華錄 (1 juan), authored by Zhang Zhichun 張之純.

Zhuangzi Juanzhai kouyi
Zhuangzi Juanzhai kouyi 莊子鬳齋口義 (10 juan), by Lin Xiyi 林希逸 (Song dynasty). - See Zhuangzi kouyi 庄子口义.

Zhuangzi jun
Zhuangzi jun 莊子雋 (1 juan), authored by Chen Jiru (Ming dynasty).

Zhuangzi kouyi
Zhuangzi kouyi 庄子口义 (Nanhua zhenjing kouyi 南華真經口義), oral interpretations of the Zhuangzi by Lin Xiyi 林希逸.

Zhuangzi kouyi buzhu
Zhuangzi kouyi buzhu 莊子口義補註, by Zhang Siwei 張四維 (Ming dynasty).

Zhuangzi miao
Zhuangzi miao 庄子邈, see Nanhua miao 南華邈 (Wen Ruhai 文如海.

Zhuangzi Nanhua jing ping
Zhuangzi Nanhua jing ping 莊子南華經評 (3 juan), authored by Tan Yuanchun 譚元春 (Ming dynasty).

Zhuangzi Nanhua zhenjing dianjiao
Zhuangzi Nanhua zhenjing dianjiao 庄子南华真经点校 / 莊子南華真經點校 (3 juan) by Liu Chenweng 劉辰翁 (1232–1297), Southern Song dynasty.

Zhuangzi Nanhua zhenjing jiaoding
Zhuangzi Nanhua zhenjing jiaoding 莊子南華真經校訂 (8 juan), authored by Huang Zhengwei.

Zhuangzi neipian dingzheng
Zhuangzi neipian dingzheng 莊子內篇訂正 (2 juan) by Wu Cheng 吳澄 (Yuan daynasty).

Zhuangzi neipian jiangshu
Zhuangzi neipian jiangshu 莊子內篇講疏 (lost), 8 juan, by Zhou Hongzheng 周宏正.

Zhuangzi neipian jiaoshi
Zhuangzi neipian jiaoshi 莊子內篇校釋 (1 juan), authored by Wen Kuangzhai 聞匡齋, i.e. Wen Yiduo 闻一多 / 聞一多 (1899-1946).

Zhuangzi neipian jieyi
Zhuangzi neipian jieyi 庄子内篇解义 by Wu Yi 吴怡.

Zhuangzi neipian xue
Zhuangzi neipian xue 庄子内篇学, study of the inner chapters (neipian) by Chen Zhu 陈柱.

Zhuangzi neipian yijie he pipan
Zhuangzi neipian yijie he pipan 庄子内篇译解和批判 (Translation, interpretation, and critique of the Inner Chapters of the Zhuangzi), by Guan Feng 关锋 (Beijing: Zhonghua shuju, 1961), with a chronological table of major events in Zhuangzi's era, and a bibliography of Zhuangzi commentaries (Zhuangzi zhujie shumu 庄子注解书目). - Online

Zhuangzi neipian zhengbu
Zhuangzi neipian zhengbu 庄子内篇证补, commentary on the “Inner Chapters” of the Zhuangzi by Zhu Guiyao 朱桂曜 (of the inner chapters).

Zhuangzi neipian zhu
Zhuangzi neipian zhu 庄子内篇注, commentary on the “Inner Chapters” of the Zhuangzi by Shi Deqing 释德清.

Zhuangzi neipian zhu
Zhuangzi neipian zhu 莊子內篇注 (4 juan), authored by Deqing (Ming dynasty).

Zhuangzi neipian zhu
Zhuangzi neipian zhu 莊子內篇注 (2 juan), authored by Wang Kaiyun 王闓運 (Qing dynasty).

Zhuangzi neipian zhu (Zhao Yifu)
Zhuangzi neipian zhu 莊子內篇注 (now lost), by Zhao Yifu 赵以夫 / 趙以夫 (1189–1256), a commentary on the “Inner Chapters” of the Zhuangzi, it is cited in the Nanhua zhenjing yihai zuanwei 南华真经义海纂微 by Chu Boxiu 褚伯秀 (Southern Song dynasty).

Zhuangzi pingdian
Zhuangzi pingdian 莊子評點, by Yan Fu 嚴復 (1853–1921).

Zhuangzi pinjie
Zhuangzi pinjie 庄子品节, by Chen Shen 陈深 (juren in 1549).

Zhuangzi pingyi
Zhuangzi pingyi 庄子平议 / 莊子平議 (3 juan), critical remarks on the Zhuangzi by Yu Yue (Qing dynasty); included in Zhuzi pingyi 诸子平议.

Zhuangzi qianzhu
Zhuangzi qianzhu 庄子浅注 ("Commentary on the Zhuangzi"), commentary by Cao Chuji 曹础基 (Zhonghua shuju, Beijing 1982).

Zhuangzi qijie
Zhuangzi qijie 庄子歧解, interpretative study of the Zhuangzi by Cui Dahua 崔大华 (Zhongzhou guji chubanshe 中州古籍出版社, Zhengzhou 1988).

Zhuangzi quangu
Zhuangzi quangu 庄子诠诂, Zhuangzi commentary by Hu Yuanjun 胡远濬.

Zhuangzi quanyan
Zhuangzi quanyan 庄子诠言, commentary on the Zhuangzi by Qian Mu 钱穆. Taibei 台北: Taiwan Shangwu yinshuguan 台湾商务印书馆, 1971 (first ed.), 1984 (third ed.).

Zhuangzi quewu
Zhuangzi quewu 庄子阙误 / 莊子闕誤, by (Ming) Yang Shen 楊慎. - See also Chen Jingyuan 陳景元: Nanhua zhenjing quewu 南華眞經闕誤, DZ.

Zhuangzi renming kao
Zhuangzi renming kao 莊子人名考 (1 juan), authored by Yu Yue (Qing dynasty).

Zhuangzi shenyin
Zhuangzi shenyin 莊子審音 by Xi Shusheng 席樹聲 (Qing dynasty).

Zhuangzi shixiao
Zhuangzi shixiao 莊子識小 (1 juan), authored by Guo Jie 郭階 (Qing dynasty).

Zhuangzi shiyi
Zhuangzi shiyi 庄子拾遗, Zhuangzi commentary by Yang Shuda 杨树达.

Zhuangzi shiyi
Zhuangzi shiyi 莊子釋意 (3 juan), authored by Gao Qiuyue 高秋月.

Zhuangzi shizhi
Zhuangzi shizhi 莊子釋滯, by Liu Xianxin 劉咸炘 (1896–1932).

Zhuangzi shu
Zhuangzi shu 庄子疏, commentary on the Zhuangzi by Cheng Xuanying 成玄英.

Zhuangzi Tianxia pian huishi
Zhuangzi Tianxia pian huishi 莊子天下篇薈釋 by Shan Yanyi 單晏一 (online).

Zhuangzi Tianxia pian jiangshu
Zhuangzi Tianxia pian jiangshu 庄子天下篇讲疏, study by Gu Shi 顾实 (Shangwu yinshuguan 商务印书馆, Shanghai 1928).

Zhuangzi Tianxia pian shiyi
Zhuangzi Tianxia pian shiyi 莊子天下篇釋義, by Liang Qichao 梁啓超 (Late Qing and Early Republican Period).

Zhuangzi Tianxia pian shuyi
Zhuangzi Tianxia pian shuyi 庄子天下篇述义, by Ma Xulun 马叙伦 (Longmen lianhe shuju, Shanghai 1958).

Zhuangzi Tianxia pian xiaoshi
Zhuangzi Tianxia pian xiaoshi 庄子天下篇校释, by Tan Jiefu 谭戒甫.

Zhuangzi tong
Zhuangzi tong 庄子通, commentary on the Zhuangzi by Wang Fuzhi 王夫之.

Zhuangzi tong
Zhuangzi tong 庄子通 (10 juan), commentary on the Zhuangzi by Shen Yiguan 沈一贯.

Zhuangzi tongyi
Zhuangzi tongyi 莊子通義 (10 juan), by (Ming) Zhu Dezhi 朱得之.

Zhuangzi Wangshi zhu
Zhuangzi Wangshi zhu 庄子王氏注 / 莊子王氏注, 2 juan, by (Qing) Wang Kaiyun 王闓運 (1833–1916).

Zhuangzi xinjian
Zhuangzi xinjian 莊子新箋 (1 juan), authored by Gao Heng.

Zhuangzi xinjie
Zhuangzi xinjie 莊子新解, by Liao Ping 廖平 (1852-1932).

Zhuangzi xinkui
Zhuangzi xinkui 庄子新窥, by Chen Yaosen 陈耀森 (Taiwan Shangwu yinshuguan 台湾商务印书馆, Taibei 1988).

Zhuangzi xinshi
Zhuangzi xinshi 庄子新释, new explanation by Zhang Mosheng 张默生.

Zhuangzi xinshu
Zhuangzi xinshu 莊子新疏, by Huang Yuanbing 黃元炳 (Republic).

Zhuangzi xintan
Zhuangzi xintan 庄子新探, by Zhang Hengshou 张恒寿 (Hubei renmin chubanshe, Wuhan 1983).

Zhuangzi xinyi
Zhuangzi xinyi 莊子新義, by Zhu Wenxiong 朱文熊 (Republic).

Zhuangzi xinzheng
Zhuangzi xinzheng 庄子新证, philological study by Yu Xingwu 于省吾.

Zhuangzi xuan
Zhuangzi xuan 莊子選 (4 juan), authored by Zhang Daoxu.

Zhuangzi xuanzhu
Zhuangzi xuanzhu 庄子选注, selected annotated edition of the Zhuangzi by Qian Mu 钱穆. Taibei 台北: Zhengzhong shuju 正中书局, 1971.

Zhuangzi xue'an
Zhuangzi xue'an 庄子学案, study by Lang Qingxiao 郎擎霄.

Zhuangzi xueshi
Zhuangzi xueshi 庄子学史, by Fang Yong 方勇 (Renmin chubanshe 人民出版社 2008; later in a revised and enlarged edition)

Zhuangzi yanjiu
Zhuangzi yanjiu 庄子研究, study by Ye Guoqing 叶国庆/葉國慶.

Zhuangxue yanjiu
Zhuangxue yanjiu 庄学研究, study of Zhuangzi thought by Cui Dahua 崔大华 (Renmin chubanshe 人民出版社, Beijing 1992).

Zhuangzi yanjiu
Zhuangzi yanjiu 庄学研究, by Chen Pinqing 陈品卿 (Taiwan Zhonghua shuju 台湾中华书局, Taibei 1982).

Zhuangzi yanjiu taolunji
Zhuangzi yanjiu taolunji 庄子研究讨论集, collection of studies on the Zhuangzi (Fudan daxue chubanshe 复旦大学出版社, Shanghai 1986).

Zhuangzi yaoyi
Zhuangzi yaoyi 庄子要义, study/commentary on the Zhuangzi by Gong Lequn 龚乐群 (Taiwan Zhonghua shuju 台湾中华书局, Taibei 1983).

Zhuangzi yi (Jiao Hong)
Zhuangzi yi 庄子翼, commentary on the Zhuangzi by Jiao Hong 焦竑.

Zhuangzi yi (Lü Huiqing)
Zhuangzi yi 庄子义, interpretation of the Zhuangzi by Lü Huiqing 吕惠卿 (Northern Song dynasty). Lost, but cited by Chu Boxiu in his Nanhua zhenjing yihai zuanwei 南华真经义海纂微.

Zhuangzi yigu
Zhuangzi yigu 庄子译诂, annotated translation/explanation of the Zhuangzi by Yang Liuqiao 杨柳桥 (Shanghai guji chubanshe 上海古籍出版社, Shanghai 1991).

Zhuangzi yishu (Dai Shen)
Zhuangzi yishu 庄子义疏 (8 juan), by Dai Shen 戴诜.

Zhuangzi yishu (He Tuo)
Zhuangzi yishu 庄子义疏 / 莊子義疏 (4 juan), by He Tuo 何妥.

Zhuangzi yishu (Li Shuzhi)
Zhuangzi yishu 庄子义疏 (lost), by Li Shuzhi 李叔之.

Zhuangzi yihai zuanwei
Zhuangzi yihai zuanwei 庄子义海纂微, comprehensive commentary on the Zhuangzi by Chu Boxiu 褚伯秀 (Southern Song dynasty).

Zhuangzi yin
Zhuangzi yin 庄子音 (now lost) by Xu Miao 徐邈, 3 juan, sparsely cited in Lu Deming's Shiwen.

Zhuangzi yinyi
Zhuangzi yinyi 庄子音义 / 莊子音義 (Sounds and Meanings of the Zhuangzi), phonological and semantic notes on the Zhuangzi by Lu Deming 陆德明 / 陸德明 (556–627). In Jingdian shiwen 经典释文. In the collection Zhuangzi yinyi, commentaries are gathered by Cui Zhuan 崔譔 (zhu 注), Xiang Xiu 向秀 (zhu 注), Sima Biao 司馬彪 (zhu 注), Guo Xiang 郭象 (zhu 注), Li Yi 李頤 (jie 解), Li Gui 李軌 (yin 音), Xu Miao 徐邈 (yin 音), and Jianwen 簡文 (shu 疏). - Zhang Yuanshan says of it: "Overall, it remains faithful to Guo Xiang’s reverse commentary (fanzhu 反注), while in specific sections it frequently cites variant readings from the editions of Sima Biao, Cui Zhuan, Xiang Xiu, Li Yi, the Yuanjia edition, as well as Guo Xiang’s own version, and often quotes the commentaries of Sima, Cui, Xiang, and Li. It is of the highest value among the editions." (ZZFYB, p. 1110 "版本价值第一 ")

Zhuangzi yinyi bianzheng
Zhuangzi yinyi bianzheng 莊子音義辨正 (1 juan), authored by Wu Chengshi 吳承仕.

Zhuangzi yinyi kaozheng
Zhuangzi yinyi kaozheng 莊子音義考證, by Lu Wenchao 卢文弨 / 盧文弨 (1717-1795).

Zhuangzi yinyi yi
Zhuangzi yinyi yi 莊子音義繹 (1 juan), authored by Ding Zhancheng 丁展成.

Zhuangzi yinyi yinshu kaolüe
Zhuangzi yinyi yinshu kaolüe 莊子音義引書考略 (Brief Survey of the Books Cited in the Zhuangzi yinyi), 1 juan, authored by Yan Lingfeng.

Zhuangzi yipian
Zhuangzi yipian 庄子逸篇 (Lost Chapters of the Zhuangzi), juan 10 in: Kunxue jiwen 困学纪闻 (Record from Arduous Studio) by Wang Yinglin 王应麟 (1223—1296), Southern Song dynasty.

Zhuangzi yizheng
Zhuangzi yizheng 庄子义证, Zhuangzi commentary by Ma Xulun 马叙伦; application of Qing dynasty philological methods to the systematic revision of the Zhuangzi text, with particular emphasis on the etymological explanations in the Shuowen jiezi 说文解字; extensive quotations from Buddhist scriptures, such as the Diamond Sutra (Jingangjing 金刚经) and the Lankavatara Sutra (Lengqiejing 楞伽经), to elucidate concepts in Zhuangzi's philosophy—an innovative approach known as "explaining Zhuangzi through Buddhism" (yi Fo jie Zhuang 以佛解庄); integration of findings from historical phonology to study loan characters and dialect words in the Zhuangzi text.

Zhuangzi yizhu
Zhuangzi yizhu 庄子译注, annotated translation of the Zhuangzi by Wang Shishun 王世舜. Jinan 济南: Shandong jiaoyu chubanshe 山东教育出版社, 1984.

Zhuangzi yuejie
Zhuangzi yuejie 庄子约解, Zhuangzi commentary by Liu Hongdian 刘鸿典.

Zhuangzi yundu
Zhuangzi yundu 莊子韻讀 (1 juan), authored by Jiang Youhao (Qing).

Zhuangzi zazhi
Zhuangzi zazhi 莊子雜志 (1 juan), authored by Wang Niansun 王念孫 (Qing).

Zhuangzi zhaji (Sun Yuxiu)
Zhuangzi zhaji 莊子札記 (1 juan), authored by Sun Yuxiu 孫毓修 (Republic).

Zhuangzi zhaji (Wu Tingxu)
Zhuangzi zhaji 莊子札記 (3 juan), by Wu Tingxu 武廷緒 (Qing dynasty).

Zhuangzi zhaji (Wu Yanwu)
Zhuangzi zhaji 莊子札記 (3 juan), authored by Wu Yanxu 武延緒.

Zhuangzi zhayi
Zhuangzi zhayi 莊子札迻 (1 juan), authored by Sun Yirang 孫詒讓 (Qing).

Zhuangzi zhangyi
Zhuangzi zhangyi 莊子章義 (5 juan), authored by Yao Nai (Qing).

Zhuangzi zhengyi
Zhuangzi zhengyi 庄子正义 / 莊子正義, by Wen Ruhai (Tang dynasty), now lost. Cited by Chen Jingyuan (Northern Song dynasty) in his Zhuangzi quewu.

Zhuangzi zhengyi (Chen Shouchang)
Zhuangzi zhengyi 庄子正义 / 莊子正義 (4 juan), authored by Chen Shouchang (Qing dynasty).

Zhuangzi zhengyi fulu
Zhuangzi zhengyi fulu 莊子正義附錄 (3 juan), authored by Chen Shouchang (Qing dynasty).

Zhuangzi zhexue
Zhuangzi zhexue 庄子哲学, by Cao Shoukun 曹受坤 (1879–1959).

Zhuangzi zhexue
Zhuangzi zhexue 庄子哲学, study by Jiang Xichang 蒋锡昌.

Zhuangzi zhexue ji qi yanbian
Zhuangzi zhexue ji qi yanbian 庄子哲学及其演变, study of Zhuangzi philosophy and its development by Liu Xiaogan 刘笑敢 (Zhongguo shehui kexue chubanshe 中国社会科学出版社, Beijing 1987).

Zhuangzi zhexue taolun ji
Zhuangzi zhexue taolun ji 庄子哲学讨论集 ("Collection of Treatises on the Philosophy of Zhuangzi"), by Zhexue yanjiu zazhishe 《哲学研究》杂志社 (Beijing: Zhonghua shuju, 1962), a collection of essays by Feng Youlan, Guan Feng, and other Zhuangzi experts.

Zhuangzi zhu (Sima Biao)
Zhuangzi zhu 庄子注 (Wei-Jin), commentary on the Zhuangzi by Sima Biao 司馬彪 (d. 306).

Zhuangzi zhu (Mr. Meng)
Zhuangzi zhu 庄子注, by Meng shi 孟氏 ("Mr. Meng") (Wei-Jin), his commentary is lost; fragments are included in the Zhuangzi yinyi by Lu Deming.

Zhuangzi zhu (Cui Zhuan)
Zhuangzi zhu 庄子注, by Cui Zhuan 崔𬤥 (Wei-Jin), his (selective) commentary is lost; fragments are included in the Zhuangzi yinyi by Lu Deming.

Zhuangzi zhu (Xiang Xiu)
Zhuangzi zhu 庄子注, by Xiang Xiu 向秀 (Wei-Jin), his (selective) commentary is lost; fragments are included in the Liezi zhu 列子注 (Liezi Commentary) by Zhang Zhan 張湛 (Wei-Jin) and in the Zhuangzi yinyi by Lu Deming (Tang dynasty).

Zhuangzi zhu (Guo Xiang)
Zhuangzi zhu 庄子注, commentary on the Zhuangzi by Guo Xiang 郭象 (d. 312).

Zhuangzi zhu (Wang Kaiyun)
Zhuangzi zhu 庄子注, commentary on the Zhuangzi by Wang Kaiyun 王闓运.

Zhuangzi zhu (Lin Zi)
Zhuangzi zhu 庄子注 (now lost), Zhuangzi commentary by Lin Zi 林自 (zi: Yidu 疑独), Northern Song dynasty. Cited in Nanhua zhenjing yihai zuanwei 南华真经义海纂微 by Chu Boxiu 褚伯秀.

Zhuangzi zhu yin
Zhuangzi zhu yin 庄子注音 (lost), 1 juan, by Li Gui 李轨, sparsely cited in the Shiwen.

Zhuangzi zuanjian
Zhuangzi zuanjian 庄子纂笺 / 莊子纂箋, study/commentary on the Zhuangzi by Qian Mu 钱穆. Taibei 台北: Dongda tushu gongsi 东大图书公司, 1951 (summaries of selections from a long list of commentators; besides Guo Xiang's annotations, it meticulously takes into account the commentaries of both ancient and modern scholars, drawing on over 150 different sources in total)

Zilüe
Zilüe 子略, Southern Song dynasty catalogue of Gao Sisun 高似孫 (fl. 1184), section Zhuangzi commentaries (Zhuangzi zhu 庄子注): Xiang Xiu 向秀 20 juan, Sima Biao 司馬彪 16 juan, Guo Xiang 郭象 10 juan, Li Ze 李賾 (Jin) 30 juan, Cui Zhuan 崔譔 10 juan, Yang Shangshan 楊上善 10 juan, Lu Zangyong 盧藏用 12 juan, Wen Ruhai 文如海 Daoist priest, 10 juan, Cheng Yuanying 成元英 Daoist priest, 30 juan, Yishu 義疏 13 juan, Zhang Zhao 張昭 10 juan, Li Ze 李賾, Wang Yuanji 王元吉 Jijie 集解 20 juan, Liang Jianwen di 梁簡文帝 Jiangshu 講疏 30 juan, Zhang Ji 張機 Jiangshu 講疏 2 juan, Li Shuzhi 李叔之 Yishu 3 juan, Song reclusive scholar, Dai Shen 戴詵 Yishu 義疏 8 juan, Wang Mu 王穆 Yishu 義疏 10 juan, Zhou Hongzheng 周宏正 Jiangshu 講疏 8 juan, Lu Deming 陸德明 Wenyiju 文義句 20 juan, Ma Kuo 馬廓 Guben zhengyi 古本正義 10 juan, Liang Kuang 梁曠 Nanhua lun 南華論 35 juan, Li Chong 李充 Lun 論 2 juan, Zhang Yinju 張隱居 Zhiyao 指要 33 pian, Zhang Youchao 張游朝 Nanhua wangxiang shuo 南華罔象説 10 juan, Jia Canliao 賈參寥 Tongzhen lun 通真論 3 juan (Tang), Bi Xuzi 碧虚子 Nanhua zong zhang 南華總章 2 juan, Zhangju 章句 7 juan, Yuan Zai 元載 Nanhua tongwei 南華通微 10 juan

=== APPENDIX ===
- 1. Hanyu da zidian 汉语大字典 (bibliography)
- 2. Japanese editions (following Harold D. Roth, in: ECT)
- 3. Wuqiubei zhai Zhuangzi jicheng mulu 无求备斋庄子集成目录 (homeinmists.com)
- 4. Zicang Zhuangzi juan 子藏·莊子卷 Table of contents (homeinmists.com)
- 5. Qinding Siku quanshu 钦定四库全书 (ctext.org)
- 6. Chinese Text Project (ctext.org)
- 7. Zhengtong Daozang 正統道藏 (Wikisource)
- 8. Zhuangzi jinzhu jinyi 庄子今注今译 (Chen Guying)
- 9. Zhuangzi fuyuan ben 庄子復原本 (bibliography) (Zhang Yuanshan)
- 10. Chapter titles (Guo Xiang edition)

==== Hanyu da zidian (bibliography) ====
The following short section is made only of (and reserved to) the information to authors, works (commentaries), and editions &c. mentioned in the Hanyu da zidian (HYDZD), especially in its bibliography:

- Chen Guying 陈鼓应 (born 1935), modern philosopher and philologist, known for work on Daoism and Neo-Daoism; author of Zhuangzi jinzhu jinyi 庄子今注今译.
- Guo Qingfan 郭庆藩 / 郭慶藩 Guō Qìngfān / Kuo Ch‘ing-fan (1844–1896), important scholar of the late Qing period; editor of Zhuangzi jishi 庄子集释 / 莊子集釋.
- Hu Huaichen 胡怀琛 (1886–1938), scholar of the late Qing/Republic period; author of Zhuangzi jijie buzheng 庄子集解补正.
- Liu Shipei 刘师培 (1884–1919), scholar, revolutionary, and philologist; author of Zhuangzi jiaobu 庄子斠补.
- Liu Wendian 刘文典 (1890–1957), philologist of the Republican period; author of Zhuangzi buzheng 庄子补正.
- Nanhua zhenjing 南华真经 ("True Classic of the Southern Florescence"), alternative title of the Zhuangzi.
- Sibu congkan 四部丛刊, large-scale photographic reproduction of classical works in the four traditional categories (jing, shi, zi, ji); the Zhuangzi reproduced therein according to the Shidetang edition (世德堂本).
- Wang Xianqian 王先谦 (1842–1917), scholar of the late Qing period; author of Zhuangzi jijie 庄子集解.
- Yu Yue 俞樾 (1821–1907), prominent philologist of the late Qing period; author of Zhuangzi pingyi 庄子平议.
- Zhang Binglin 章炳麟 (1869–1936), also Zhang Taiyan; philologist, activist, and modern scholar; author of Zhuangzi jiegu 庄子解故.
- Zhuangzi 庄子, classical Daoist text, traditionally attributed to Zhuang Zhou (4th/3rd century BCE); rich in parables and philosophical allegory; divided into Inner, Outer, and Miscellaneous Chapters.
- Zhuangzi buzheng 庄子补正, critical edition of the Zhuangzi by Liu Wendian; Yunnan renmin chubanshe, 1980.
- Zhuangzi jiaobu 庄子斠补, critical supplements to the Zhuangzi by Liu Shipei; in Liu Shenshu xiansheng yishu 刘申叔先生遗书.
- Zhuangzi jiegu 庄子解故, philologically critical commentary by Zhang Binglin; in Zhangshi congshu (章氏丛书).
- Zhuangzi jijie 庄子集解, annotated collection on the Zhuangzi by Wang Xianqian; in the series Zhuzi jicheng 诸子集成, photographic reproduction by Zhonghua shuju.
- Zhuangzi jijie buzheng 庄子集解补正, additions and corrections to existing commentaries; compiled by Hu Huaichen; in Puxuezhai congshu 朴学斋丛书 – first series.
- Zhuangzi jinzhu jinyi 庄子今注今译, modern commentary and translation of the Zhuangzi by Chen Guying; Zhonghua shuju, 1983.
- Zhuangzi jishi 庄子集释, influential and still fundamental annotated edition of the Zhuangzi by Guo Qingfan; Zhonghua shuju, 1961.
- Zhuangzi pingyi 庄子平议, critical remarks on the Zhuangzi by Yu Yue; included in Zhuzi pingyi (诸子平议).

==== Japanese editions ====
Following mainly Harold D. Roth: "Chuang tzu" (in: ECT – M. Loewe, ed., pp. 65–66) in this section.

- Kambun taikei; no. 9, 1911, edited by Hattori Unokichi 服部宇之吉.
- Kanseki kokujikai zensho 漢籍國字解全書; (a) no. 9, 1910, edited by Mōri Teisai 毛利貞斎; (b) nos. 28, 29, 1914, edited by Makino Kenjirō (Sōshō).
- Kokuyaku kambun taisei 国訳漢文大成; no. 7, 1920, edited by Kimida Rentarō.
- Kambun sōsho 漢文叢書, 1928, edited by Hattori Unokichi 服部宇之吉.
- Keisho taikō 經書大講; nos. 10–12, 1938–39.
- Shinshaku kambun taikei 新釈漢文大系; nos. 7–8, 1966–67, edited by Ichikawa Yasuji and Endō Tatsuo.
- Chūgoku no shisō 中国の思想; no. 12, 1965, edited by Kishi Yōko.
- Chūgoku koten bungaku taikei 中国古典文学大系; no. 4, 1973, edited by Kuraishi Takeshirō and Seki Masao.
- Chūgoku koten shinsho 中国古典新書, 1968, edited by Abe Yoshio 阿部吉雄. *
- Shintei Chūgoku koten sen 新訂中国古典選; nos. 7–9, 1966–67, edited by Fukunaga Mitsuji 福永光司.

==== Wuqiubei zhai Zhuangzi jicheng (chubian & xubian) ====
For the volumes contained in the two collections Wuqiubeizhai Zhuangzi jicheng chubian (無求備齋莊子集成初編), and Wuqiubeizhai Zhuangzi jicheng xubian (無求備齋莊子集成續編), see homeinmists.com: Wuqiubei zhai Zhuangzi jicheng mulu 無求備齋莊子集成目錄.

Table of contents (Wuqiubei zhai Zhuangzi jicheng mulu 无求备斋庄子集成目录)

Wuqiubeizhai Zhuangzi jicheng chubian (無求備齋莊子集成初編)

Volume 1

1. Nanhua zhenjing 南華真經 Zhuang Zhou 莊周, 明正統間刊「道藏」本 [= "Daoist Canon" edition, Zhengtong 正統 reign-period (1436-1449) of the Ming 明 era (1368-1644)]

2. Nanhua zhenjing zhu 南華真經註 Guo Xiang 郭象, 北宋南宋刊合璧本 [unified edition from Northern and Southern Song dynasty]

Volume 2

3. Zhuangzi nanhua zhenjing 莊子南華真經 Guo Xiang 郭象, 明張登雲參補朱東光刊「中立四子」本 [supplementend and correctey by (Ming) Zhang Dengyun, printed by Zhu Dongguang, Zhongdu sizi ji 中立四子集 edition]

4. Zhuangzi zhiyao 莊子治要 Wei Zheng 魏徵, 日本尾張國校刊「群書治要」本

5. Zhuangzi yinyi 莊子音義 Lu Deming 陸德明, 清乾隆五十六年盧文弨刊「抱經堂叢書」本

6. Zhuangzi yinyi 莊子音義 Lu Deming 陸德明, 日本「沙洲二十六子」排印本

Volumes 3–4

7. Nanhua zhenjing zhushu 南華真經註疏 Cheng Xuanying 成玄英, 清光緒十年刊「古逸叢書」本

Volume 5

8. Zhuangzi yilin 莊子意林 Ma Zong 馬總, 清乾隆間刊「武英殿聚珍版叢書」本

9. Nanhua miao 南華邈 Wen Ruhai 文如海, 「道藏」本

10. Zhuangzi jieyi 莊子解義 Lü Huiqing 呂惠卿, 民國二十三年陳任中輯校排印本

11. Nanhua zhangju yinyi 南華章句音義 Chen Jingyuan 陳景元, 清道光間錢熙祚刊「指海」本

12. Nanhua zhangju yushi 南華章句餘事 Chen Jingyuan 陳景元, 「道藏」本

13. Zhuangzi quewu 莊子闕誤 Chen Jingyuan 陳景元, 「道藏」本

14. Nanhua jing zhiyin 南華經直音 Jia Shanxiang 賈善翔, 「道藏」本

Volume 6

15. Nanhua zhenjing xinzhuan 南華真經新傳 Wang Yuanze 王元澤, 「道藏」本

Volumes 7–8

16. Nanhua zhenjing kouyi 南華真經口義 Lin Xiyi 林希逸, 「道藏」本

Volumes 9–10

17. Zhuangzi kouyi buzhu 莊子口義補註 Zhang Siwei 張四維, 明萬曆五年何汝成校刊本

18. Nanhua neipian dingzheng 南華內篇訂正 Wu Cheng 吳澄, 「道藏」本

Volume 11

19. Zhuangzi pinjie 莊子品節 Chen Shen 陳深, 明萬曆十九年刊「諸子品節」本

20. Guoziyizhuang 郭子翼莊 Gao Deng 高櫈, 明嘉靖間天一閣刊本

21. Guoziyizhuang 郭子翼莊 Gao Deng 高櫈, 清李調元刊「函海」本

22. Nanhua biaolue 南華標略 Zhang Wei 張位, 明萬曆間刊本

Volume 12

23. Nanhua jing jizhu 南華經集注 Pan Jiqing 潘基慶, 明刊本

Volumes 13–14

24. Nanhua jing huijie 南華經薈解 Guo Lianghan 郭良翰, 明天啟六年刊本

Volume 15

25. Nanhua dayi jiexuan canzhu 南華大義解懸參注 Zangyun shanfang zhuren 藏雲山房主人, 明稿本

Volume 16

26. Zhuangzi gaohuang 莊子膏肓 Ye Bingjing 葉秉敬, 明萬曆四十二年刊本

Volume 17

27. Yaodi paozhuang 藥地炮莊 Fang Yizhi 方以智, 民國二十一年成都美學林排印本

Volume 18

28. Zhuangzi yin 莊子因 Lin Yunming 林雲銘, 清乾隆間刊本

Volume 19

29. Zhuangzi jie 莊子解 Wang Fuzhi 王夫之 Wang Yi 王敔 增注, 清同治四年湘鄉曾氏金陵節署重刊本

30. Zhuangzi tong 莊子通 Wang Fuzhi 王夫之, 清同治四年湘鄉曾氏金陵節署重刊本

Volume 20

31. Zhuangzi zhi xue 莊子之學 Ma Su 馬驌, 清康熙九年刊「繹史」本

32. Nanhua jianchao 南華簡鈔 Xu Tinghuai 徐廷槐, 清乾隆六年刊本

33. Zhuangzi chao 莊子鈔 Pu Qilong 浦起龍, 清乾隆九年三吳書院刊本

34. Zhuangzi cunjiao 莊子存校 Wang Maohong 王懋竑, 清同治十一年福建撫署刊本

Volume 21

35. Zhuangzi dujian 莊子獨見 Hu Wenying 胡文英, 清乾隆十六年三多齋刊本 36. Nanhua tong 南華通 Qu Fu 屈復 Li Yuanchun 李元春 評, 清道光十五年刊「青照堂叢書」本

Volume 22

37. Zhuangzi jie 莊子解 Wu Jun 吳峻, 清道光二十四年世楷堂刊「昭代叢書」本

38. Nanhua zhenjing yingshi 南華真經影史 Zhou Gongchen 周拱辰, 清道光二十七年刊「周孟侯先生全書」本

39. Zhuangzi jie 莊子解 Wu Shishang 吳世尚, 民國九年劉氏刊「貴池先哲遺書」本

Volume 23

40. Sima Biao Zhuangzi zhu 司馬彪莊子注 Huang Shi 黃奭, 民國二十三年刊「黃氏逸書考」本

41. Yi Zhuangzi 逸莊子 Huang Shi 黃奭, 民國二十三年刊「黃氏逸書考」本

42. Zhuangzi jipin 莊子集評 Gao Rang 高嵣, 清乾隆五十三年刊本

43. Zhuangzi shuji 莊子述記 Ren Zhaolin 任兆麟, 清乾隆五十三年刊本

44. Zhuangzi shuji 莊子述記 Ren Zhaolin 任兆麟, 清光緒十年刊本

45. Zhuangzi yinyi kaozheng 莊子音義考證 Lu Wenchao 盧文弨, 清乾隆五十六年刊本

46. Zhuangzi wencui 莊子文粹 Li Baogan 李寶淦, 民國八年排印本

47. Nanhua jing fayin 南華經發隱 Yang Wenhui 楊文會, 清光緒三十年刊本

Volumes 24–25

48. Nanhua xuexin pian 南華雪心篇 Liu Fengbao 劉鳳苞, 清光緒二十三年晚香堂刊本

Volume 26

49. Zhuangzi diankan 莊子點勘 Wu Rulun 吳汝綸, 清宣統二年排印本

50. Zhuangzi jijie 莊子集解 Wang Xianqian 王先謙, 清宣統元年湖南思賢書局刊本

51. Zhuangzi xuyi 莊子敘意 Liao Ping 廖平, 民國十年刊本

52. Zhuangzi neipian zhengbu 莊子內篇證補 Zhu Guiyao 朱桂曜, 民國二十四年排印本

Volume 27

53. Zhuangzi qianshuo 莊子淺說 Lin Shu 林紓, 民國十一年排印本

54. Baihua Zhuangzi duben 白話莊子讀本 Ye Yulin 葉玉麟, 民國二十三年排印本

55. Zhuangzi zhexue 莊子哲學 Jiang Xichang 蔣錫昌, 民國二十六年排印本

Volumes 28–29

56. Zhuangzi buzheng 莊子補正 Liu Wendian 劉文典, 民國二十八年排印本

57. Zhuangzi suoji 莊子瑣記 Liu Wendian 劉文典, 民國十七年排印本

Volume 30

58. Zhuangzi canjuan jiaoji 莊子殘卷校記 Wang Zhongmin 王重民, 民國六十一年打字景印本

59. Zhuangzi yanjiu 莊子研究 Ye Guoqing 葉國慶, 民國二十五年排印本

60. Zhuangzi shiyi 莊子釋義 Zhang Xu 張栩, 民國二十七年排印本

61. Zhuangzi xinzheng 莊子新證 Yu Shengwu 於省吾, 民國二十八年排印本

62. Zhuangzi zhexue 莊子哲學 Cao Shoukun 曹受坤, 民國三十七年排印本

63. Zhuangzi neipian jieshuo 莊子內篇解說 Cao Shoukun 曹受坤, 民國三十七年排印本

64. Zhuangzi shiyi 莊子拾遺 Yang Shuda 楊樹達, 民國五十一年排印本

Wuqiubeizhai Zhuangzi jicheng xubian (無求備齋莊子集成續編)

Volume 1

Zhuangzi nanhua zhenjing 莊子南華眞經, 3 juan, Song 宋 Liu Chenweng 劉辰翁 點校, 明刊劉須溪點校三子本

Volume 2

2. Nanhua zhenjing xunben 南華眞經循本, 30 juan, Ming 明 Luo Miandao 羅勉道 撰, Peng Xiang 彭祥 點校, 正統閒刊道藏本

Volume 3

3. Zhuangzi jie 莊子解, 1 juan Ming 明 Yang Shen 楊慎 撰, 明刊升庵外集本

4. Zhuangzi quewu 莊子闕誤, 1 juan Ming 明 Yang Shen 楊慎 撰, 明刊升庵外集本

Volume 3–4

5. Zhuangzi 莊子, 10 juan, Ming 明 Zhu Dezhi 朱得之, 傍註併通義 嘉靖四十三年浩然齋刊本

Volume 5

6. Nanhua fafu 南華發覆, 8 juan Ming 明 Shi Xingtong 釋性通 撰, 乾隆十四年刊本

7. Zhuangzi leizuan 莊子類纂, 2 juan, Ming 明 Shen Lü 沈律 撰, 隆慶元年刊本

Volume 6

8. Zhuangzi nanhua zhenjing 莊子南華眞經, 4 juan, Ming 明 Xie Rushao 謝汝韶 批校, 國立中央圖書館藏萬曆六年崇德書院刊本

Volume 7–8

9. Nanhua zhenjing fumo 南華眞經副墨, 33 juan, Ming 明 Lu Xixing 陸西星 撰, 明孫大綬重校萬曆六年刊本

Volume 9–10

10. Zhuangzi tong 莊子通, 10 juan Ming 明 Shen Yiguan 沈一貫 撰, 萬曆中刊本

Volume 11–12

11. Zhuangzi yi 莊子翼, 8 juan, Ku Zhuangzi quewu san juan 坿莊子闕誤, 3 juan, Ming 明 Jiao Hong 焦竑 撰, Song 宋 Chen Jingyuan 陳景元 撰坿錄 萬曆十六年長庚館刊本

Volume 13–14

12. Zhuangzi nanhua zhenjing jingjie 莊子南華眞經精解, 9 juan, Ming 明 Chen Yidian 陳懿典 撰, 萬曆四十五年刊本

Volume 15

13. Zhuangzi xuanyan pingyuan 莊子玄言評苑, 4 juan, Ming 明 Lu Kejiao 陸可教 選, Ming 明 Li Tingji 李廷機 訂, 明刊本

Volume 16

14. Nanhua zhenjing 南華眞經, 8 juan, Ming 明 Feng Mengzhen 馮夢禎 重校, 萬曆中尚友軒刊本

Volume 17

15. Nanhua jing 南華經, 6 juan, Ming 明 Yang Qiyuan 楊起元 註釋, 明刊本

Volume 18

16. Xinke Kuiyang Huang xiansheng Nanhua wensui 新刻葵陽黃先生南華文髓, 7 juan, Ming 明 Huang Hongxian 黃洪憲 評輯, 明刊本

17. Zhuangzi jie 莊子解, 2 juan, Ming 明 Li Zhi 李贄 撰, 萬曆四十三年刊本

Volume 19

18. Nanhua zhenjing pingzhu 南華眞經評註, 10 juan, Jin 晉 Guo Xiang 郭象 撰 Ming 明 Gui Youguang 歸有光 批閱 Ming 明 Wen Zhenmeng 文震孟 訂, 天啓四年竹塢刊本

Volume 20

19. Gumeng Zhuangzi 古蒙莊子, 4 juan, Ming 明 Wang Jixian 王繼賢 訂 Ming 明 Wu Zongyi 吳宗儀 校釋, 萬曆三十九年刊本

Volume 21

20. Nanhua jing yinran 南華經因然, 6 juan, Ming 明 Wu Boyu 吳伯與 撰, 明刊本

Volume 22

21. Zhuangzi yi pingdian 莊子翼評點, 8 juan, Ming 明 Dong Maoce 董懋策 撰, 光緒三十二年刊本

22. Xinke Han Huizhuang zhushi Zhuangzi Nanhua jing Hu Bai 新刻韓會狀註釋莊子南華經狐白, 4 juan, Ming 明 Han Jing 韓敬 撰, 萬曆四十二年刊本

Volume 23

23. Zhanghezhai Nanhua richao 丈荷齋南華日抄, 4 juan, Ming 明 Xu Xiao 徐曉 撰, 崇禎十年刊本

Volume 24

24. Jie Zhuang 解莊, 12 juan, Ming 明 Tao Wangling 陶望齡 撰, 天啓元年刊本

Volume 25

25. Nanhua quanjing fen zhangju jie 南華全經分章句解, 4 juan, Ming 明 Chen Rong 陳榮 選, 明刊本

26. Zhuangzi neipian zhu 莊子內篇註, 4 juan, Ming 明 Shi Deqing 釋德淸 撰, 光緒十四年刊本

Volume 26–27

27. Nanhua zhenjing benyi 南華眞經本義, 16 juan, 附錄, 8 juan Ming 明 Chen Zhian 陳治安 撰, 道光十五年刊本

28. Zhuangzi Nanhua zhenjing 莊子南華眞經, 3 juan, Ming 明 Tan Yuanchun 譚元春 評, 崇禎八年刊本

Volume 28

29. Nanhua zhenjing 南華眞經, 33 juan, Ming 明 Cheng Yining 程以寧 注疏, 嘉慶中蔣元庭刊道藏輯要本

Volume 29

30. Nanhua chundian 南華春點, 8 juan, Ming 明 Liu Shilian 劉士璉 撰, 明刊本

Volume 30

31. Nanhua zhenjing 南華眞經, 8 juan, Ming 明 Huang Zhengwei 黃正位 校, 明刊巾箱本

32. Juanmei Gong Chen xiansheng pingxuan Zhuangzi Nanhua jing 鐫眉公陳先生評選莊子南華經, 1 juan, Ming 明 Chen Jiru 陳繼儒 撰 明蕭鳴盛刊五子雋本

33. Zhuangzi jie 莊子解, 1 juan, Qing 淸 Fu Shan 傅山 撰, 宣統三年刊本

Volume 31

34. Zhuangzi shiyi 莊子釋意, 3 juan, Qing 淸 Gao Qiuyue 高秋月 撰, 康熙中刊本

35. Zhuang-Qu hegu 莊屈合詁, 7 juan, Qing 淸 Qian Chengzhi 錢澄之 撰, 同治三年刊本

Volume 32

36. Nanhua jingjie 南華經解, 33 juan, Qing 淸 Xuan Ying 宣穎 撰, 同治六年半畝園刊本

Volume 33

37. Zhuangzi bianzhen 莊子辯正, 6 juan, Qing 淸 Hu Fang 胡方 撰, 嘉慶十九年刊本

Volume 34

38. Nanhua li zhai cui 南華瀝摘萃, 1 juan, Qing 淸 Ma Lu 馬魯 撰, 同治九年刊本

39. Zhuangzi xue 莊子雪, 3 juan, Qing 淸 Lu Shuzhi 陸樹芝 撰, 嘉慶四年刊本

Volume 35

40. Zhuangzi zhangyi 莊子章義, 5 juan, 附錄, 1 juan, Qing 淸 Yao Nai 姚鼐 撰 光緒五年刊本

41. Zhuangzi xuan 莊子選, 4 juan, Qing 淸 Zhang Daoxu 張道緒 撰, 嘉慶十六年刊本

Volume 36

42. Zhuangzi yundu 莊子韵讀, 1 juan, Qing 淸 Jiang Yougao 江有誥 撰, 嘉慶十九年刊本

43. Zhuangzi conglu 莊子叢錄, 1 juan, Qing 淸 Hong Yixuan 洪頤煊 撰, 道光二年刊本

44. Zhuangzi zazhi 莊子雜志, 1 juan, Qing 淸 Wang Niansun 王念孫 撰, 道光十二年刊本

45. Nanhua jingjie 南華經解, 3 juan, Qing 淸 Fang Qian 方潛 撰, 光緒二十二年桐城方氏刊本

46. Zhuangzi neipian 莊子內篇, 2 juan, Qing 淸 Wang Kaiyun 王闓運 注, 同治八年刊本

47. Zhuangzi pingyi 莊子平議, 3 juan Qing 淸 Yu Yue 俞樾 撰, 光緒二十五年刊本

48. Zhuangzi renming kao 莊子人名考, 1 juan, Qing 淸 Yu Yue 俞樾 撰, 光緒二十五年刊本

Volume 37

49. Nanhua zhenjing zhengyi 南華眞經正義, 4 juan, Nanhua zhenjing shiyi 南華眞經識餘, 3 juan, Qing 淸 Chen Shouchang 陳壽昌 撰 光緒十九年刊本

50. Zhuangzi shixiao 莊子識小, 1 juan, Qing 淸 Guo Jie 郭階 撰, 光緒十五年刊本

51. Zhuangzi zhayi 莊子札迻, 1 juan, Qing 淸 Sun Yirang 孫詒讓 撰, 光緒二十年刊本

Volume 38–39

52. Zhuangzi jishi 莊子集釋, 10 juan, Qing 淸 Guo Qingfan 郭慶藩 撰, 光緒二十年刊本

Volume 40

53. Zhuangzi jiegu 莊子解故, 1 juan, Minguo 民國 六年 Zhang Binglin 章炳麟 撰, 章氏叢書本

54. Zhuangzi xiaoshu 莊子校書, 3 juan, Qing 淸 Yu Chang 于鬯 撰, 民國五十二年排印本

55. Du zhuzhi zhaji 讀諸子札記, 1 juan, Qing 淸 Tao Hongqing 陶鴻慶 撰, 民國八年排印本

56. Zhuangzi zhupu 莊子斠補, 1 juan, Minguo 民國 二十五年 Liu Shipai 劉師培 撰, 排印本

57. Zhuangzi zhaji 莊子札記, 3 juan, Qing 淸 Wu Tingxu 武廷緒 撰, 民國二十一年刊本

58. Zhuangzi buzhu 莊子補註, 4 juan, Minguo 民國 六年 Xi Tong 奚侗 撰, 排印本

Volume 41

59. Zhuangzi jinghua lu 莊子菁華錄, 1 juan, Qing 淸 Zhang Chun 張純 撰, 民國七年排印本

60. Nanhua zhenjing zhaji 南華眞經札記, 1 juan, Minguo 民國 二十五年 Sun Yuxiu 孫毓修 撰, 排印本

61. Nanhua zhenjing canjuan jiaoji 南華眞經殘卷校記, 1 juan, Qing 淸 Luo Zhenyu 羅振玉 撰, 民國十二年刊本

62. Zhuangzi yinyi bianzheng 莊子音義辨正, 1 juan, Minguo 民國 十二年 Wu Chengshi 吳承仕 撰, 排印本

63. Chan Zhuang 闡莊, 1 juan, Minguo 民國 二十四年 Chen Zhu 陳柱 撰, 排印本

64. Zhuangzi jizhu 莊子集註, 5 juan, Minguo 民國 十九年 Ruan Yusong 阮毓崧 撰, 排印本

Volume 42

65. Zhuangzi yinyi yi 莊子音義繹, 1 juan, 勘誤表, 1 juan, Minguo 民國 二十三年 Ding Zhancheng 丁展成 撰, 排印本

66. Zhuangzi jijie buzheng 莊子集解補正, 1 juan, Minguo 民國 二十九年 Hu Huaichen 胡懷琛 撰, 排印本

67. Zhuangzi xinjian 莊子新箋, 1 juan, Minguo 民國 五十年 Gao Heng 高亨 撰, 排印本

68. Zhuangzi jiaozheng 莊子校證, 1 juan, Minguo 民國 六十二年 Yang Mingzhao 楊明照 撰, 打字景印本

69. Zhuangzi neipian jiaoshi 莊子內篇校釋, 1 juan, fu Zhuangzi lun 坿莊子論, 1 juan, Minguo 民國 四十六年 Wen Yiduo 聞一多 撰, 排印本

70. Zhuangzi jijie neipian buzhen 莊子集解內篇補正, 7 juan, Minguo 民國 四十七年 Liu Wu 劉武 撰, 排印本

71. Zhuangzi yinyi yinshu kaolue 莊子音義引書考略, 1 juan, Minguo 民國 六十二年 Yan Lingfeng 嚴靈峯 撰, 打字景印本

72. Wuqiubei zhai xiancang weiyin Zhuangzi shumu 無求備齋現藏未印莊子書目, 1 juan, Yan Lingfeng 嚴靈峯 輯

==== Zicang Zhuangzi juan 子藏·莊子卷 ====
Texts listed in the section Table of contents of Zicang Zhuangzi juan (《子藏·莊子卷》總目錄), in: homeinmists.com: 子藏 道家部 莊子卷:

Table of contents (Zicang Zhuangzi juan 子藏·莊子卷 總目錄)

Nanhua zhenjing 南華真經, 5 juan, (Zhou) Zhuang Zhou 莊周撰. 據明正統《道藏》本.

Zhuangzi Nanhua zhenjing 莊子南華真經, 10 juan, (Zhou) Zhuang Zhou 莊周撰, (Ming) Wang Maoming 王懋明校. 據明如禪室刊本.

Nanhua zhenjing 南華真經, 10 juan, (Zhou) Zhuang Zhou 莊周撰, (Ming) Chen Nan 陳楠校. 據明刊本.

Zhuangzi Nanhua zhenjing 莊子南華真經, 3 juan, (Ming) Wu Mianxue 吳勉學校. 據明萬曆中刊《二十子》本.

Nanhua jing 南華經,不分卷, (Zhou) Zhuang Zhou 莊周撰, 佚名圈校. 據清抄本.

Nanhua zhenjing 南華真經, 10 juan, (Jin) Guo Xiang 郭象註. 據宋刊本.

Zhuangzi Nanhua zhenjing 莊子南華真經, 10 juan, (Jin) Guo Xiang 郭象註, (Qing) Qian Lucan 錢陸燦批點並跋. 據明刊本.

Nanhua zhenjing 南華真經, 10 juan, (Jin) Guo Xiang 郭象註, (Tang) Lu Deming 陸德明音義, (Qing) Shen Yan 沈巗校並跋. 據明嘉靖十二年顧春世德堂刊《六子書》本.

Nanhua zhenjing 南華真經, 10 juan, (Jin) Guo Xiang 郭象註, (Tang) Lu Deming 陸德明音義, (Minguo) Fu Zengxiang 傅增湘校跋並錄清羅振玉題識. 據明嘉靖十二年顧春世德堂刊《六子書》本.

Nanhua zhenjing 南華真經, 10 juan, (Jin) Guo Xiang 郭象註, (Tang) Lu Deming 陸德明音義, (Minguo) Fu Zengxiang 傅增湘校並跋. 據明嘉靖十二年顧春世德堂刊《六子書》本.

Zhuangzi Guozhu 莊子郭註, 10 juan, (Jin) Guo Xiang 郭象註, (Tang) Lu Deming 陸德明音義, (Ming) Zou Zhiyi 鄒之嶧校刻. 據明萬曆三十三年小築刊本.

Fenzhang biaoti Nanhua zhenjing 分章標題南華真經, 10 juan, (Jin) Guo Xiang 郭象註, (Tang) Lu Deming 陸德明音義, (Minguo) Lao Jian 勞健題款. 據宋刊本.

Zhuangzi yinyi 莊子音義, 3 juan, (Tang) Lu Deming 陸德明撰. 據宋元遞修《經典釋文》本.

Zhuangzi yinyi 莊子音義, 3 juan, (Tang) Lu Deming 陸德明撰. 據日本奈良天理大學圖書館所藏宋刊本.

Zhuangzi zhiyao 莊子治要, (Tang) Wei Zheng 魏徵等節選. 據民國八年上海涵芬樓《四部叢刊》影印日本天明七年刊《群書治要》本.

Nanhua zhenjing zhushu 南華真經註疏, 10 juan, (Tang) Cheng Xuanying 成玄英撰. 據清光緒中黎庶昌輯《古逸叢書》覆宋本.

Nanhua miao 南華邈, 1 juan, (Tang) Wen Ruhai 文如海撰. 據明正統《道藏》本.

Nanhua Qiushui pian 南華秋水篇, (Song) Liu Chang 劉敞書. 據民國間上海有正書局依宋嘉祐五年劉敞手書影印本.

Nanhua zhenjing zhangju yinyi 南華真經章句音義, 14 juan, (Song) Chen Jingyuan 陈景元撰. 據明正統《道藏》本.

Nanhua zhenjing zhangju yushi 南華真經章句餘事, 1 juan, (Song) Chen Jingyuan 陈景元撰. 據明正統《道藏》本.

Nanhua zhenjing quewu 南華真經闕誤, (Song) Chen Jingyuan 陳景元撰. 據明正統《道藏》本.

Nanhua zhenjing yushi zalu 南華真經餘事雜錄, 2 juan, (Song) Chen Jingyuan 陳景元輯. 據明正統《道藏》本.

Renchen chonggaizheng Lü taiwei jingjin Zhuangzi quanjie 壬辰重改證呂太尉經進莊子全解, 10 juan, (Song) Lü Huiqing 呂惠卿撰, (Ming) Wen Peng 文彭、Wu Yuangong 吳元恭題款. 據金大定十二年刊本.

Song Lü guanwen jin Zhuangzi yi 宋呂觀文進莊子義, 10 juan, (Song) Lü Huiqing 呂惠卿撰, (Minguo) Chen Renzhong 陳任中校輯. 據民國二十三年北京大北印書局排印本.

Guangchengzi jie 廣成子解, 1 juan, (Song) Su Shi 蘇軾撰. 據清乾隆中綿州李氏萬卷樓刊、嘉慶十四年李調元重校《函海》本.

Nanhua zhenjing xinchuan 南華真經新傳, 20 juan, (Song) Wang Pang 王雱撰. 據明正統《道藏》本.

Nanhua zhenjing xinchuan 南華真經新傳, 20 juan, (Song) Wang Pang 王雱撰. 據明抄本.

Nanhua zhenjing zhiyin 南華真經直音, 1 juan, (Song) Jia Shanxiang 賈善翔撰. 據明正統《道藏》本.

Zhuang Lie shilun 莊列十論, 1 juan, (Song) Li Shibiao 李士表撰. 據明正統《道藏》本.

Zhuangzi lun 莊子論, (Song) Cheng Ju 程俱撰. 據民國二十三年上海涵芬樓依江安傅氏雙鑒樓藏景宋寫本《北山小集》景印.

Zhuangzi fayu 莊子法語, 4 juan, (Song) Hong Mai 洪邁撰. 據民國十五年《擇是居叢書初集》景刊景鈔宋本《經子法語》.

Zhuangzi Juanzhai kouyi 莊子鬳齋口義, 10 juan, (Song) Lin Xiyi 林希逸撰. 據南宋刊本.

Zuantu huzhu Nanhua zhenjing 纂圖互注南華真經, 10 juan, (Song) Gong Shigao 龔士卨撰. 據元刊本.

Nanhua zhenjing yihai zuanwei 南華真經義海纂微, 106 juan, (Song) Chu Boxiu 褚伯秀撰. 據明正統《道藏》本.

Zhuangzi yipian 莊子逸篇, (Song) Wang Yinglin 王應麟輯. 據清同治九年揚州書局依太原閻氏箋本重刊《困學紀聞》本.

Zhuangzi Nanhua zhenjing 莊子南華真經, 3 juan, (Song) Liu Chenweng 劉辰翁點校. 據明萬曆刊本.

Zhuangzi Nanhua zhenjing 莊子南華真經, 3 juan, (Song) Lin Xiyi 林希逸口義、Liu Chenweng 劉辰翁點校, (Ming) Tang Shunzhi 唐順之釋畧. 據明萬曆十年徐常吉刊本.

Nanhua zhenjing xunben 南華真經循本, 30 juan, (Song) Luo Miandao 羅勉道撰. 據明正統《道藏》本.

Zhuangzhou qijue jie 莊周氣訣解, 1 juan, (Song) Yuwen Juzi 宇文居鎡撰. 據明正統《道藏》本.

Zhuangzi neipian dingzheng 莊子內篇訂正, 2 juan, (Yuan) Wu Cheng 吳澄撰. 據明正統《道藏》本.

Zhuangzi Yangsheng zhu 莊子養生主, 佚名集註. 據《永樂大典》卷八千五百八十七.

Zhuangzi Tianyun 莊子天運, 佚名集註. 據《永樂大典》卷一萬五千九百五十五.

Zhuangzi zuanyao 莊子纂要, (Ming) Liao Yaoqing 黎堯卿輯. 據明刊《诸子纂要》本.

Zhuangzi tongyi 莊子通義, 10 juan, (Ming) Zhu Dezhi 朱得之撰, (Ming) Fu Shan 傅山批點. 據明嘉靖三十九年浩然齋刊本.

Zhuangzi jie 莊子解, 1 juan, (Ming) Yang Shen 楊慎撰. 據清乾隆六十年養拙山房刊《升庵外集》本.

Zhuangzi quewu 莊子闕誤, 1 juan, (Ming) Yang Shen 楊慎撰. 據清光緒元年湖北崇文書局刊《子書百家》本.

Zhuangzi nanzi 莊子難字, (Ming) Yang Shen 楊慎撰. 據明萬曆三十三年手抄本《楊升庵字學四種》.

Nanhua zhenjing biaojie 南華真經標解, 6 juan, (Ming) Shao Bian 邵弁撰. 據明刊本.

Yi Zhuang 翼莊, 1 juan, (Ming) Gao Deng 高登撰. 據清乾隆中綿州李氏萬卷樓刊、嘉慶十四年李調元重校《函海》本.

Guangchengzi shulüe 廣成子疏略, 1 juan, (Ming) Wang Wenlu 王文祿撰. 據民國二十七年上海涵芬樓景印明隆慶刊《百陵学山》本.

Nanhua zhenjing fumo 南華真經副墨, 8 juan, (Ming) Lu Xixing 陸西星撰. 據明萬曆六年李齊芳刊本.

Shaoshi Zhang xiansheng piping Zhuangzi yi 少師張先生批評莊子義, 10 juan, (Ming) Zhang Juzheng 張居正撰. 據明萬曆八年劉維刊本.

Zhuangzi Juanzhai kouyi buzhu 莊子鬳齋口義補註, 10 juan, (Ming) Zhang Siwei 張四維撰. 據明萬曆二年敬義堂刊《三子口義》本.

Zhuangzi yiyaoshan 莊義要刪, 10 juan, (Ming) Sun Yingao 孫應鰲撰. 據明萬曆八年陶幼學刊本.

Nanhuang jingjie 南華經解, 2 juan, (Ming) Li Zhi 李贄撰. 據明刊本.

Zhuangzi leizuan 莊子類纂, (Ming) Shen Jin 沈津撰. 據上海圖書館藏朝鮮刊《百家類纂》本.

Zhuangzi tong 莊子通, 10 juan, (Ming) Shen Yiguan 沈一貫撰. 據明萬曆十五年至十六年蔡貴易刊、二十七年重修《老莊通》本.

Nanhua jing biaolüe 南華經標略, 6 juan, (Ming) Zhang Wei 張位撰. 據明萬曆十八年吳氏籍甚齋刊本.

Nanhua zhenjing tiping 南華真經題評, 10 juan, (Ming) Zhang Wei 張位撰. 據明萬曆刊本.

Zhuangzi Nanhua zhenjing 莊子南華真經, 4 juan, (Ming) Xie Rushao 謝汝韶批校. 據明萬曆六年吉藩崇德書院刊《二十家子書》本.

Zhuangzi yi 莊子翼, 8 juan, (Ming) Jiao Hong 焦竑撰. 據明萬曆十六年王元貞校刊《老莊翼》本.

Xinqie hanlin sanzhuangyuan huixuan Zhuangzi pinhui shiping 新鍥翰林三狀元會選莊子品彙釋評, (Ming) Jiao Hong 焦竑校正、Weng Zhengchun 翁正春參閱、Zhu Zhifan 朱之蕃圈點. 據明萬曆四十四年刊本.

Nanhua zhenjing yizuan 南華真經義纂, 10 juan, (Song) Chu Boxiu 褚伯秀、(Ming) Zhu Dezhi 朱得之撰, (Ming) Li Shi 李栻輯. 據明刊本.

Nanhua zhenjing 南華真經, 10 juan, (Jin) Guo Xiang 郭象註, (Tang) Lu Deming 陸德明音義, (Ming) Sun Kuang 孫鑛評點. 據明世德堂刊本.

Zhuangzi Nanhua zhenjing 莊子南華真經, 10 juan, (Ming) Zhang Dengyun 張登雲參補. 據明萬曆七年朱東光刊《中立四子》本.

Nanhua fafu 南華發覆, 8 juan, (Ming) Shi Xingtong 釋性𣻢撰. 據清乾隆十四年雲林懷德堂刊本.

Zhuangzi pinjie 莊子品節, (Ming) Chen Shen 陳深撰. 據明萬曆間刊《諸子品節》本.

Guan Lao-Zhuang yingxiang lun 觀老莊影響論, 1 juan, (Ming) Shi Deqing 釋德清撰. 據明萬曆間刊《憨山老人夢遊集》本.

Zhuangzi neipian zhu 莊子內篇註, 4 juan, (Ming) Shi Deqing 釋德清撰. 據清光緒十四年金陵刻經處刊本.

Nanhua jing pinjie 南華經品節, (Ming) Yang Qiyuan 楊起元撰. 據明萬曆二十二年刊《諸經品節》本.

Nanhua zhenjing pangzhu 南華真經旁注, 5 juan, (Ming) Fang Xuming 方虛名撰. 據明萬曆二十二年刊本.

Nanhua zhenjing 南華真經, 8 juan, (Ming) Feng Mengzhen 馮夢禎校註. 據明刊本.

Nanhua zhenjing 南華真經, 8 juan, (Ming) Huang Zhengwei 黃正位校批. 據清乾隆四十一年大成齋刊本.

Zhuangzi yishuo 莊子弋說, (Ming) Shen Changqing 沈長卿撰. 據明萬曆刊《沈氏弋說》本.

Nanhua jing biebian 南華經別編, 2 juan, (Ming) Wang Zongmu 王宗沐撰. 據明萬曆三年施觀民刊本.

Yutang jiaochuan Rugang Chen xiansheng Nanhua jing jingjie 玉堂校傳如崗陳先生南華經精解, 8 juan, (Ming) Chen Yidian 陳懿典撰. 據明萬曆二十二年熊雲濱刊本.

Nanhua zhenjing sanzhu daquan 南華真經三註大全, 21 juan, (Ming) Chen Yidian 陳懿典撰. 據明萬曆二十一年自新齋余翼我刊本.

Zhuangzi 莊子, (Ming) Gui Youguang 歸有光輯評. 據明刊《諸子彚函》本.

Nanhua zhenjing pingzhu 南華真經評註, 10 juan, (Jin) Guo Xiang 郭象註, (Ming) Gui Youguang 歸有光批閱、Wen Zhenmeng 文震孟訂正. 據明天啓四年竺塢刊《道德南華二經評注》本.

Jie Zhuang 解莊, (Ming) Tao Wangling 陶望齡撰, (Ming) Guo Zhengyu 郭正域評. 據明天啟元年吳興茅兆河刊朱墨套印本.

Zhuangzi juan 莊子雋, 1 juan, (Ming) Chen Jiru 陳繼儒撰. 據明蕭鳴盛刊《五子雋》本.

Zhuangzi gaohuang 莊子膏肓, 4 juan, (Ming) Ye Bingjing 葉秉敬撰. 據明萬曆四十二年刊本.

Dun jushi pi Zhuangzi neipian 遯居士批莊子內篇, 1 juan, (Ming) Gu Qiyuan 顧起元撰. 據明刊《歸鴻館雜著八種》本.

Xinke Kuiyang Huang xiansheng Nanhua wensui 新刻葵陽黃先生南華文髓, 8 juan, (Ming) Huang Hongxian 黃洪憲撰. 據明萬曆間八閩上郡書林喬山堂龍田刊本.

Guang Zhuang 廣莊, 1 juan, (Ming) Yuan Hongdao 袁宏道撰. 據明崇禎二年佩蘭居刊《袁中郎全集》本.

Dao Zhuang 導莊, (Ming) Yuan Zhongdao 袁中道撰. 據明萬曆四十六年刊《珂雪齋集選》本.

Shuo Zhuang 說莊, 3 juan, (Ming) Li Tengfang 李騰芳撰. 據明萬歷四十二年范鳳翼開萬閣刊本.

Zhuangzi Nanhua zhenjing 莊子南華真經, 4 juan, (Ming) Min Qiji 閔齊伋輯校. 據明閔齊伋刻朱墨套印本.

Xinke Han huizhuang zhushi Zhuangzi Nanhua zhenjing hubai 新刻韓會狀註釋莊子南華真經狐白, 4 juan, (Ming) Han Jing 韓敬撰. 據明萬曆四十二年書林余氏自新齋刊本.

Zhuangzi qishang 莊子奇賞, 4 juan, (Ming) Chen Renxi 陳仁錫評選. 據明天啟刊《諸子奇賞》本.

Nanhua jing 南華經, 16 juan, (Jin) Guo Xiang 郭象註, (Song) Lin Xiyi 林希逸口義、Liu Chenweng 劉辰翁點校, (Ming) Wang Shizhen 王世貞評點、Chen Renxi 陳仁錫批註. 據明吳興淩君寔刊五色套印本.

Gumeng Zhuangzi 古蒙莊子, 4 juan, (Ming) Wang Jixian 王繼賢訂正、Wu Zongyi 吳宗儀校釋. 據明萬曆三十九年蒙城縣學王繼賢刊本.

Nanhua jing yinran 南華經因然, 6 juan, (Ming) Wu Boyu 吳伯與撰. 據明刊本.

Nanhua jing Jinzhu 南華經晉注, (Ming) Lu Fu 盧復輯. 據明錢塘盧氏溪香館刊本.

Zhuangzi yi pingdian 莊子翼評點, 8 juan, (Ming) Dong Cece 董懋策撰. 據清光緒三十二年會稽董氏取斯家塾刊《董氏叢書》本.

Zhanghezhai Nanhua richao 丈荷齋南華日抄, 4 juan, (Ming) Xu Xiao 徐曉撰. 據明崇禎十年刊本.

Ce Zhuang 測莊, 1 juan, (Ming) 石人隱士撰. 據明天啟六年快堂刊《快書》本.

Zhuangzi que 莊子榷, (Ming) Jin Zhaoqing 金兆清撰. 據明崇禎八年刊本.

Zhuangzi Nanhua zhenjing 莊子南華真經, 3 juan, (Ming) Tan Yuanchun 譚元春評閱、Zhang Pu 張溥參正. 據明崇禎八年刊本.

Zhuangzi tizheng 莊子提正, 1 juan, (Ming) Jiao Lang Daosheng 覺浪道盛撰. 據明末清初刊《嘉興藏》本.

Nanhua gu 南華詁, 6 juan, (Ming) Wei Guangxu 魏光緒撰. 據明崇禎十年刊本.

Nanhua jing jizhu 南華經集註, 7 juan, (Ming) Pan Jiqing 潘基慶撰. 據明刊本.

Nanhua jing jujie 南華經句解, 4 juan, (Ming) Chen Rongxuan 陳榮選撰. 據清乾隆三年饒青軒刊本.

Nanhua jing yaoshan zhushi pinglin 南華經要刪註釋評林, 10 juan, (Ming) Chen Rongxuan 陳榮選校輯. 據明萬曆十四年刊本.

Nanhua jing huijie 南華經薈解, 33 juan, (Ming) Guo Lianghan 郭良翰撰. 據明天啓六年刊本.

Nanhua zhenjing benyi 南華真經本義, 16 juan, 附錄 8 juan, (Ming) Chen Zhi'an 陳治安撰. 據明崇禎五年刊本.

Nanhua zhenjing zhushu 南華真經註疏, 4 juan, (Ming) Cheng Yining 程以寧撰. 據清光緒三十二年成都二仙庵重刊《道藏輯要》本.

Nanhua chundian 南華春點, (Ming) Liu Shilian 劉士璉撰. 據明刊本.

Nanhua jing taixian 南華經臺縣, 3 juan, (Ming) Wu Bojing 吳伯敬撰. 據明萬曆三十八年吳士京刊本.

Fu Qingshu xiansheng fashu Nanhua jing 傅青主先生法書南華經, (Ming) Fu Shan 傅山撰. 據民國間依明傅山手跡影印本.

Zhuangzi jie 莊子解, (Ming) Fu Shan 傅山撰. 據清宣統三年山陽丁寶銓刊《霜紅龕集》本.

Yaodi pao Zhuang 藥地炮莊, 9 juan, 附錄 3 juan, (Ming) Fang Yizhi 方以智撰. 據清康熙三年廬陵曾玉祥此藏軒刊本.

Yaodi pao Zhuang 藥地炮莊, 9 juan, (Ming) Fang Yizhi 方以智撰. 據民國二十一年成都美學林排印本.

Zhuangzi gu 莊子詁,不分卷, (Ming) Qian Chengzhi 錢澄之撰. 據清同治二年斟雉堂刊《飲光先生全書》本《莊屈合詁》.

Qiyuan zhitong 漆園指通, 3 juan, (Ming) 俍亭Jing Ting 淨挺撰. 據明末清初刊《嘉興藏》本.

Du Zhuang xiaoyan 讀莊小言, 1 juan, (Ming) Wen Deyi 文德翼撰. 據清乾隆刊本.

Nanhua zhenjing yingshi 南華真經影史, 9 juan, (Ming) Zhou Gongchen 周拱辰撰. 據清嘉慶八年聖雨齋重刊本.

Zhuangzi tong 莊子通, 1 juan, (Ming) Wang Fuzhi 王夫之撰. 據清同治四年金陵節署湘鄉曾氏刊《船山遺書》本.

Zhuangzi jie 莊子解, 33 juan, (Ming) Wang Fuzhi 王夫之撰. 據清同治四年金陵節署湘鄉曾氏刊《船山遺書》本.

Nanhua yayan 南华雅言, 1 juan, (Ming) Zhuang Yuanchen 莊元臣撰. 據手抄本《莊忠甫雜著》.

Nanhua cibi 南华泚笔, 2 juan, (Ming) Cao Zongfan 曹宗璠撰. 據清康熙間刊《金壇曹氏集四種》本.

Baihuitang Zhuangzi yin 拜環堂莊子印, 8 juan, (Ming) Tao Chongdao 陶崇道撰. 據清順治陶淶陶澴刊本.

Zhuangzi zhi xue 莊子之學, (Qing) Ma Su 馬驌撰. 據清康熙間刊《繹史》本.

Nanhua zhenjing hezhu chuiying 南華真經合註吹影, 33 juan, (Qing) Hu Wenwei 胡文蔚撰. 據清刊本.

Zhuangzi yin 莊子因, 6 juan, (Qing) Lin Yunming 林雲銘撰. 據清光緒六年常州培本堂善書局刊本.

Du Zhuangzi fa 讀莊子法, 1 juan, (Qing) Lin Yunming 林雲銘撰. 據清光緒二年世楷堂刊《昭代叢書》本.

Du Zhuang yi xue 讀莊一吷,不分卷, (Qing) Gu Ruhua 顧如華撰. 據清木活字本.

Yong Zhuang ji 詠莊集, 1 juan, (Qing) Cheng Congda 程從大著. 據清康熙十八年程氏培風堂刊本.

Lian Zhuang 聯莊, (Qing) Zhang Chao 張潮撰. 據清康熙間新安張氏霞舉堂刊《檀几叢書》本.

Nanhua jing zhi 南華經質, (Qing) Wang Taizheng 王泰徵輯釋. 清康熙間刊本.

Zhuangzi duben 莊子讀本, 1 juan, (Qing) Fang Renjie 方人傑撰. 據清乾隆三十七年刊《莊騷讀本》本.

Zhuangzi pangzhu 莊子旁注, 5 juan, (Qing) Wu Chengjian 吳承漸輯注. 清康熙三十八年璫水春波漁舍刊本.

Zhuangzi shiyi 莊子釋意, 3 juan, (Qing) Gao Qiuyue 高秋月集說、Cao Tongchun 曹同春論正. 據清康熙二十九年文粹堂刊本.

Zhuangzi jie 莊子解, 12 juan, (Qing) Wu Shishang 吳世尚撰. 據民國九年劉氏刊《貴池先哲遺書》本.

Nanhua jingjie 南華經解, 33 juan, (Qing) Xuan Ying 宣穎撰. 據清同治五年皖城藩署刊本.

Nanhua jing zhuan shi 南華經傳釋, 1 juan, (Qing) Zhou Jinran 周金然撰. 據清嘉慶間南滙吳省蘭聽彜堂刊《藝海珠塵》本.

Zhuangzi bianzheng 莊子辯正, 6 juan, (Qing) Hu Fang 胡方撰. 據清嘉慶十九年鴻桷堂刊本.

Chang Zhuang 唱莊, 1 juan, (Qing) Shen Bao 沈堡撰. 據清乾隆十九年刊《漁莊晚唱》本.

Nanhua jianchao 南華簡鈔, 4 juan, (Qing) Xu Tinghuai 徐廷槐撰. 據清乾隆六年刊本.

Zhuangzi cunjiao 莊子存校, (Qing) Wang Maoheng 王懋竑撰. 據清同治十一年福建撫署刊《讀書論疑》本.

Zhuangzi weidinggao 莊子未定稿, 4 juan, (Qing) He Rulong 何如漋撰. 據清嘉慶十七年何東閣刊本.

Nanhua tong 南華通, 7 juan, 題(Qing) Qu Fu 屈復撰. 據清道光十五年陝西朝邑李元春刊《青照堂叢書》本.

Zhuangzi huikao 莊子彙考, 等 4 juan, (Qing) Chen Menglei 陳夢雷、Jiang Tingxi 蔣廷錫輯. 據清光緒二十年依雍正四年內府銅活字本影印《古今圖書集成》本.

Zhuangzi chao 莊子鈔, (Qing) Pu Qilong 浦起龍撰. 據清乾隆九年三吳書院刊《古文眉詮》本.

Nanhua tong 南華通, 7 juan, (Qing) Sun Jiagan 孫嘉淦撰. 據清刊本.

Nanhua benyi 南華本義,不分卷, (Qing) Lin Zhongyi 林仲懿撰. 清乾隆十六年刊本.

Ni zhai ru cang Nanhua jing 擬摘入藏南華經, 1 juan, (Qing) Wu Zhensheng 吳震生撰. 清嘉慶間刊《笠閣叢書》本.

Zhuangzi jie 莊子解, 1 juan, (Qing) Wu Jun 吳峻撰. 據清光緒二年世楷堂刊《昭代叢書》本.

Nanhua jing dayi jiexuan canzhu 南華經大意解懸參注, 5 juan, (Qing) 藏雲山房主人撰. 據手稿本.

Zhuangzi shuji 莊子述記, 1 juan, (Qing) Ren Zhaolin 任兆麟撰. 據清光緒十年蜀西廖氏閑雲精舍刊《任氏述記》本.

Zhuangzi yinyi kaozheng 莊子音義考證, 3 juan, (Qing) Lu Wenchao 盧文弨撰. 據清乾隆五十六年盧氏刊《抱經堂叢書》本.

Zhuangzi dujian 莊子獨見,不分卷, (Qing) Hu Wenying 胡文英撰. 據清乾隆十七年同德堂刊本.

Nanhua zhenjing yihai zuanwei kaozheng 南華真經義海纂微考證, (Qing) Wang Taiyue 王太嶽等纂. 據清乾隆三十九年北京武英殿活字《欽定四庫全書考證》本.

Zhuangzi chao 莊子鈔, (Qing) Gao Tang 高嵣撰. 據清乾隆五十三年廣郡永邑培元堂楊氏刊《高梅亭讀書叢鈔》本《歸餘鈔》.

Nanhua li zhaicui 南華瀝摘萃, 1 juan, (Qing) Ma Lu 馬魯摘評. 據清同治九年敦倫堂刊本.

Zhuangzi zhangyi 莊子章義, 5 juan, (Qing) Yao Nai 姚鼐撰. 據清光緒五年桐城徐宗亮刊《惜抱軒遺書三種》本.

Fangzhai bu Zhuang 方齋補莊, 1 juan, (Qing) Fang Zhengyuan 方正瑗撰. 據清光緒十四年刊《桐城方氏七代遺書》本.

Zhuangzi zazhi 莊子雜志, (Qing) Wang Niansun 王念孫撰. 據清同治九年金陵書局刊《讀書雜志·餘編》本.

Zhuangzi xue 莊子雪, 3 juan, (Qing) Lu Shuzhi 陸樹芝撰. 據清嘉慶四年文選樓刊本.

Zhuangzi jiexuan 莊子節選, (Qing) Yang Zugui 楊祖桂撰. 據手稿本.

Zhuangzi gu 莊子故, (Qing) He Mengyao 何夢瑤撰. 據清刊本.

Sima Biao Zhuangzi zhu 司馬彪莊子注, 附莊子注考逸, (Qing) Sun Fengyi 孫馮翼輯. 據清嘉慶二至七年承德孫氏刊《問經堂叢書》本.

Zhuangzi xuan 莊子選, 4 juan, (Qing) Zhang Daoxu 張道緒撰. 據清嘉慶十六年人境軒刊《文選十三種》本.

Zhuangzi yipian 莊子逸篇, (Song) Wang Yinglin 王應麟輯, (Qing) Wan Xihuai 萬希槐集證. 據清嘉慶十二年山淵堂刊《困學紀聞五箋集證》本.

Zhuangzi yipian 莊子逸篇, (Song) Wang Yinglin 王應麟輯, (Qing) Weng Yuanqi 翁元圻注. 據清道光五年餘姚翁氏守福堂刊《困學紀聞注》本.

Zhuangzi Nanhua jing xinyin 莊子南華經心印,不分卷, (Qing) Zhu Dunyi 朱敦毅撰. 據手稿本.

Nanhua jing 南华经, 3 juan, (Qing) Lang Maoxue 郎懋學參註. 據清抄本.

Zhuangzi benyi 莊子本義, 2 juan, (Qing) Mei Chong 梅沖撰. 據清道光元年承學堂刊本.

Xiaoyaoyou shi 逍遙遊釋, (Qing) Xu Rundi 徐潤第撰. 據清光緒三年徐繼畬校勘《敦艮齋遺書》本.

Du Zhuangzi conglu 讀莊子叢錄, (Qing) Hong Yixuan 洪頤煊撰. 據清光緒十三年醉六堂刊《傳經堂叢書》本《讀書叢錄》.

Zhuangzi yundu 莊子韻讀, (Qing) Jiang Yougao 江有誥撰. 據清嘉慶道光間刊《江氏音學十書》本《先秦韻讀》.

Sima Biao Zhuangzi zhu 司馬彪莊子注, 附莊子司馬注補遺等, (Qing) Mao Panlin 茆泮林輯. 據清道光十四年梅瑞軒刊《梅瑞軒十種古逸書》本.

Zhuangzi neipian shunwen 莊子內篇順文,不分卷, (Qing) Dai Xu 戴煦撰. 據手稿本.

Sima Biao Zhuangzi zhu 莊子司馬彪注, 附逸莊子, (Qing) Huang Shi 黃奭輯. 據清光緒間刊《漢學堂叢書》本.

Zhuangzi 莊子, 1 juan, (Qing) Zeng Guofan 曾國藩節選. 據民國十三年上海有正書局排印《古文四象》本.

Xiangzhu Zhuangzi zachao 詳註莊子雜鈔, (Qing) Zeng Guofan 曾國藩鈔. 據上海會文堂印《詳註經史百家雜鈔》本.

Zhuangzi zhengdu neipian 莊子正讀內篇, (Qing) Yang Yisun 楊沂孫撰. 據手稿本.

Zhuangzi zhaji 莊子扎記, 1 juan, (Qing) Guo Songtao 郭嵩燾撰. 據清光緒元年湖北崇文書局刊《百家子書》本《莊子集釋》後附.

Du Zhuang zhaji 讀莊劄記, 1 juan, (Qing) Zhu Jingzhao 朱景昭撰. 據民國二十二年排印《無夢軒遺書》本.

Nanhua zhiyue 南華指月, 6 juan, (Qing) Zhang Shibao 張士保撰. 據手稿本.

Nanhua waizapian bianwei 南華外雜篇辨偽, 4 juan, (Qing) Zhang Shibao 張士保撰. 稿本.

Nanhua jingjie 南華經解,不分卷, (Qing) Fang Qian 方潛撰. 據清光緒二十二年桐城方氏刊本.

Zhuangzi pingyi 莊子平議, 3 juan, (Qing) Yu Yue 俞樾撰. 據清光緒十一年刊《春在堂全書》本《諸子平議》.

Zhuangzi renming kao 莊子人名考, 1 juan, (Qing) Yu Yue 俞樾撰. 據清光緒十一年刊《春在堂全書》本.

Zhuangzi shenyin 莊子審音,不分卷, (Qing) Xi Shusheng 席樹聲輯. 據清末刻本.

Nanhua zhuijie 南華贅解,不分卷, (Qing) Liu Fengbao 劉鳳苞撰. 據清末劉起庚抄本.

Nanhua xuexin bian 南華雪心編, 8 juan, (Qing) Liu Fengbao 劉鳳苞撰. 據清光緒二十三年晚香堂刊本.

Zhuangzi yuejie 莊子約解, 4 juan, (Qing) Liu Hongdian 劉鴻典撰. 據清同治五年威邑呂仙巖玉成堂刊本.

Nanhua zhenjing zhengyi 南華真經正義,不分卷, 附錄 3 juan, (Qing) Chen Shouchang 陳壽昌撰. 據清光緒十九年怡顔齋刊本.

Zhuangzi Wangshi zhu 莊子王氏注, 2 juan, (Qing) Wang Kaiyun 王闓運撰. 據清同治八年長沙王氏刊本.

Baidajia pingzhu Zhuangzi Nanhua jing 百大家評註莊子南華經, 10 juan, (Ming) Gui Youguang 歸有光等批點, (Qing) Wang Kaiyun 王闓運輯評. 民國六年中華圖書館石印本.

Nanhua jing fayin 南華經發隱, 1 juan, (Qing) Yang Wenhui 楊文會撰. 清光緒三十年金陵刻經處刊《楊仁山居士遺書》本.

Zhuangzi diankan 莊子點勘, 10 juan, (Qing) Wu Rulun 吳汝綸撰. 清宣統二年衍星社排印《桐城吳先生點勘七子》本.

Zhuangzi jibian 莊子集辨, (Qing) Zeng Herui 曾和瑞撰. 清光緒十年刊本.

Zhuangzi shixiao 莊子識小, 1 juan, (Qing) Guo Jie 郭階撰. 清光緒十五年刊《春暉雜稿》本.

Zhuangzi jijie 莊子集解, 8 juan, (Qing) Wang Xianqian 王先謙撰. 據清宣統元年湖南思賢書局刊本.

Zhuangzi jishi 莊子集釋, 10 juan, (Qing) Guo Qingfan 郭慶藩撰. 清光緒二十年湖南思賢講舍刊本.

Du Zhuangzi zhaji 讀莊子札記, 8 juan, (Qing) Guo Qingfan 郭慶藩撰. 據手稿本.

Nanhua jing jiangyi 南華經講義, 28 juan, (Qing) Tao Junxuan 陶浚宣撰. 清末民初手抄本.

Zhuangzi bian'e 莊子辯訛, (Qing) Liu Zhongying 劉鍾英撰. 據手稿本.

Zhuangzi zhayi 莊子札迻, (Qing) Sun Yirang 孫詒讓撰. 據清光緒二十年瑞安孫氏刊《札迻》本.

Zhuangzi jiaoshu 莊子校書, 3 juan, (Qing) Yu Chang 于鬯撰. 據1963年中華書局排印《香草續校書》本.

Zhuangzi bushi 莊子補釋, 1 juan, (Qing) Ning Tiaoyuan 寧調元撰. 據民國四年排印《太一遺書》本.

Zhuangzi jingshuo xuyi 莊子經說敘意, (清末民初) Liao Ping 廖平撰. 據民國十年四川存古書局刊《新訂六譯館叢書》本.

Zhuangzi Tianxia pian xinjie 莊子天下篇新解, (清末民初) Liao Ping 廖平撰. 據民國十年四川存古書局刊《新訂六譯館叢書》本.

Zhuangzi qianshuo 莊子淺說, 4 juan, (清末民初) Lin Shu 林紓撰. 據民國十二年上海商務印書館排印本.

Zhuangzi datong shuo 莊子大同說, (清末民初) Wang Shunan 王樹枏撰. 陶盧精抄本.

Zhuangzi datong shuo 莊子大同說, (清末民初) Wang Shunan 王樹枏撰. 古學院抄本.

Zhuangzi datong xue 莊子大同學, 佚名撰. 手抄本.

Zhuangzi gu 莊子故, 8 juan, (清末民初) Ma Qichang 馬其昶撰, (清末民初) Yan Fu 嚴復評點. 據清光緒三十一年刊《集虛草堂叢書》本.

Zhuangzi pingdian 莊子評點, (清末民初) Yan Fu 嚴復撰, (近人) Zeng Keden 曾克耑校錄. 1953年香港《岷雲堂叢刊》本.

Zhuangzi zhaji 莊子札記, 3 juan, (清末民初) Wu Yanxu 武延緒撰. 據民國二十一年永年武氏所好齋刊《所好齋札記》本.

Zhuangzi fawei 莊子發微, (清末民初) Wang Chuanxie 王傳燮撰. 民國五年排印本.

Du Zhuangzi zhaji 讀莊子札記, 1 juan, (清末民初) Tao Hongqing 陶鴻慶撰. 據民國八年待曉廬排印《讀諸子札記》本.

Zhuangzi wencui 莊子文粹, 2 juan, (清末民初) Li Baoqiang 李寶洤撰. 據民國六年商務印書館排印《諸子文粹》本.

Zhuangzi Nanhua jing neipian 莊子南華經內篇, 無名氏抄寫、圈點, Nie Shouren 聶守仁附識. 手抄本.

Nanhua zhenjing canjuan jiaoji 南華真經殘卷校記, 1 juan, (清末民初) Luo Zhenyu 羅振玉撰. 民國十二年刊《永豐鄉人雜著續編》本.

Zhuangzi zhaji 莊子札記, 1 juan, (清末民初) Sun Yuxiu 孫毓修撰. 民國八年上海涵芬樓影印《四部叢刊》本.

Zhuangzi Tianxia pian shiyi 莊子天下篇釋義, (清末民初) Liang Qichao 梁啓超撰. 據民國二十五年上海中華書局排印《飲冰室合集》本.

Zhuangzi qiwen yanyi 莊子奇文演義, (清末民初) 香夢詞人撰. 據民國八年上海大東書局排印本.

Zhuangzi jie 莊子解, (民國) Zhu Qingchang 朱青長撰. 民國石印本.

Zhuangzi jizhu gaoben 莊子集注稿本, 5 juan, (民國) Ruan Yushang 阮毓崧撰. 據民國十九年上海中華書局影印本.

Chongding Zhuangzi jizhu 重訂莊子集注, 5 juan, (民國) Ruan Yushang 阮毓崧撰. 民國二十五年上海中華書局排印本.

Zhuangzi huitong 莊子匯通, (民國) Zheng Xingsi 鄭星駟撰. 民國二十年排印本.

Zhuangzi jiegu 莊子解故, 1 juan, (民國) Zhang Binglin 章炳麟撰. 據民國六年浙江圖書館刊《章氏叢書》本.

Qiwulun shi 齊物論釋, 1 juan, (民國) Zhang Binglin 章炳麟撰. 民國六年浙江圖書館刊《章氏叢書》本.

Qiwulun shi dingben 齊物論釋定本, 1 juan, (民國) Zhang Binglin 章炳麟撰. 民國六年浙江圖書館刊《章氏叢書》本.

Zhuangzi Wangben jizhu 莊子王本集注, (民國) Li Dafang 李大防撰. 據民國二十二年石印本.

Zhuangzi jiaobu 莊子斠補, 1 juan, (民國) Liu Shipei 劉師培撰. 據民國二十五年甯武南氏排印《劉申叔先生遺書》本.

Xiaoyaoyou shi 逍遙遊釋,不分卷, (民國) Sun Zhicheng 孫至誠撰. 民國十三年排印本.

Zhuangzi quangu 莊子詮詁,不分卷, (民國) Hu Yuanjun 胡遠濬撰. 民國六年排印本.

Zhuangzi jinghua lu 莊子菁華錄, 8 juan, (民國) Zhang Zhichun 張之純撰. 據民國二十八年上海商務印書館排印《評註諸子菁華錄》本.

Zhuangzi qianxun 莊子淺訓, (民國) Jiang Zhaoxie 蔣兆燮撰. 據民國八年上海新民圖書館排印本.

Zhuangzi buzhu 莊子補注, 4 juan, (民國) Xi Tong 奚侗撰. 據民國六年江蘇省立官紙印刷廠排印本.

Zhuangzi Tianxia pian jiangshu 莊子天下篇講疏, (民國) Gu Shi 顧實撰. 據民國十七年上海商務印書館排印本.

Zhuangzi zhangyi 莊子章義, (民國) Hu Pu'an 胡樸安撰. 據民國三十二年安吳胡氏樸學齋刊《樸學齋叢書》本.

Zhuangzi neipian zhangyi qianshuo 莊子內篇章義淺說, (民國) Hu Pu'an 胡樸安撰. 據民國十二年國學研究會排印《國學彙編》第三集.

Zhuangzi zhi xue 莊子之學, (民國) Jin Qiyuan 金其源撰. 民國三十七年商務印書館排印《讀書管見》本.

Zhuangzi zhexue 莊子哲學, 附莊子內篇解說, (民國) Cao Shoukun 曹受坤撰. 據民國三十七年石印本.

Du Zhuang qiongnian lu 讀莊窮年錄, 2 juan, (民國) Qin Yuliu 秦毓鎏撰. 民國六年排印本.

Zhuangzi yanjiu ji qianshi 莊子研究及淺釋, (民國) Wang Zhixin 王治心撰. 民國二十五年上海羣學社排印本.

Zhuangzi xinyi 莊子新義, (民國) Zhu Wenxiong 朱文熊撰. 據民國二十三年無錫民生排印本.

Zhuangzi yinyi bianzheng 莊子音義辨證, (民國) Wu Chengshi 吳承仕撰. 民國十二年排印《經籍舊音辨證》本.

Zhuangzi shizhi 莊子釋滯, (民國) Liu Xianxin 劉咸炘撰. 《推十書》.

Zhuangzi luosong 莊子洛誦, (民國) Tao Ximu 陶西木撰. 民國二十二年中華印刷局排印本.

Zhuangzi zhanming 莊子瞻明, (民國) Tao Ximu 陶西木撰. 據民國間石印本.

Zhuangzi dazhuan 莊子大傳, (民國) Chen Dengxie 陳登澥撰. 據民國二十三年北平文嵐簃排印《七閩叢書》本.

Zhuangzi yinyi yi 莊子音義繹, 1 juan, (民國) Ding Zhanchang 丁展成撰. 據民國二十年排印本（附《老子校語》後）.

Zhuangzi xue'an 莊子學案, (民國) Lang Qingxiao 郎擎霄撰. 據民國二十三年上海商務印書館排印本.

Zhuangzi zhexue 莊子哲學, 1 juan, Zhuangzi ziyi 莊子字義, 1 juan, 佚名撰. 手稿本.

Zhuangzi jijie buzheng 莊子集解補正, (民國) Hu Huaichen 胡懷琛撰. 據民國二十九年安吳胡氏排印《朴學齋叢書》第一集.

Du Zhuangzi Tianxia pian shuji 讀莊子天下篇疏記, (民國) Qian Jibo 錢基博撰. 據民國二十二年上海商務印書館排印《國學小叢書》本.

Zhuangzi Tianxia pian leizuan 莊子天下篇類纂, (民國) Qian Jibo 錢基博撰. 民國二十年上海商務印書館排印《國學文選類纂》本.

Zhuangzi Tianxia pian shi 莊子天下篇釋, 1 juan, (民國) Fang Guang 方光撰. 據民國十六年惠陽方山山館排印《國學別錄》本.

Zhuangzi jiaoshi 莊子校釋, (民國) Zhi Weicheng 支偉成撰. 據民國十三年上海泰東圖書局排印本.

Zhuangzi zhexue 莊子哲學, (民國) Su Jiarong 蘇甲榮撰. 民國十九年排印本.

Zhuangzi zheng 莊子正, 1 juan, (民國) Shi Yongye 石永壄撰. 據民國三十四年石印本.

Zhuangzi xinshu 莊子新疏, (民國) Huang Yuanbing 黃元炳撰. 民國二十二年上海醫學書局排印本.

Baihua yijie Zhuangzi 白話譯解莊子, (民國) Ye Yulin 葉玉轔（麟）撰. 據民國二十四年大達圖書供應社排印本.

Zhuangzi neipian xue 莊子內篇學, (民國) Chen Zhu 陳柱撰. 據民國五年中國學術討論社排印本.

Chan Zhuang 闡莊, 3 juan, (民國) Chen Zhu 陳柱撰. 民國二十四年北流陳氏十萬卷樓刊《子二十六論》本.

Zhuangzi neipian zhengb u 莊子內篇證補, (民國) Zhu Guiyao 朱桂曜撰. 據民國二十四年上海商務印書館排印《國學小叢書》本.

Zhuangzi yinde 莊子引得, (民國) Nie Xiaosan 聶筱珊等編纂. 民國三十六年哈佛燕京學社排印本.

Zhuangzi neipian jiaoshi 莊子內篇校釋, (民國) Wen Yiduo 聞一多撰. 據1949年開明書店版《聞一多全集》本.

Zhuangzi zhangju 莊子章句, (民國) Wen Yiduo 聞一多撰. 據手稿本.

Zhuangzi jiaobu 莊子校補, (民國) Wen Yiduo 聞一多撰. 手稿本.

Zhuangzi jiaoshi 莊子校拾, (民國) Wen Yiduo 聞一多撰. 手稿本.

Zhuangzi yishu 莊子義疏, (民國) Wen Yiduo 聞一多撰. 手稿本.

Zhuangzi xintan 莊子新探, (民國) Shi Zhang 施章撰. 據民國十九年國立中央大學出版部排印本.

Nanhua zhizhi 南華直旨, (民國) Yang Wenxuan 楊文煊撰. 據民國二十五年北平星星日報印刷部排印本.

Zhuangzi Tianxia pian zishu qi xueshuo jiuju zhi jieshi 莊子天下篇自述其學說九句之解釋, (民國) Hu Zilin 胡子霖撰. 據民國二十九年成都黃埔出版社排印《黃埔季刊》第二卷第四期.

Nanhua jingjie xuandu 南華經解選讀, (近人) Zhou Xuexi 周學熙選. 據民國二十一年周氏師古堂刊本.

Zhuangzi shiyi 莊子拾遺, 1 juan, (近人) Yang Shuda 楊樹達撰. 1962年北京中華書局排印《積微居讀書記》本.

Zhang Taiyan Zhuangzi jiegu boyi 章太炎莊子解詁駁義, 2 juan, (近人) Liu Wu 劉武撰. 手抄本.

Zhuangzi jijie neipian buzheng 莊子集解內篇補正, (近人) Liu Wu 劉武撰. 據1958年古籍出版社排印本.

Zhuangzi zhaji 莊子札記, (近人) Ma Xulun 馬敘倫撰. 據民國間排印本.

Zhuangzi yizheng 莊子義證, 33 juan, (近人) Ma Xulun 馬敘倫撰. 據民國十九年上海商務印書館排印本.

Zhuangzi Tianxia pian shuyi 莊子天下篇述義, (近人) Ma Xulun 馬敘倫撰. 1958年上海龍門聯合書局排印本.

Zhuangzi Tianxia pian jiaoshi 莊子天下篇校釋, 1 juan, (近人) Tan Jiefu 譚戒甫撰. 據民國間湘潭譚氏油印本.

Zhuangzi Tianxia pian jiaoshi 莊子天下篇校釋, 1 juan, (近人) Tan Jiefu 譚戒甫撰. 據民國二十四年漢口華中日報社排印本.

Zhuangzi suoji 莊子瑣記, (近人) Liu Wendian 劉文典撰. 民國十七年上海商務印書館排印《三餘札記》本.

Zhuangzi buzheng 莊子補正, 10 juan, (近人) Liu Wendian 劉文典撰. 據民國三十六年上海商務印書館排印本.

Zhuangzi guyi 莊子詁義, 10 juan, (近人) Fan Gengyan 范耕研撰. 據手抄本.

Zhuangzi xinshi 莊子新釋, (近人) Zhang Mosheng 張黙生撰. 民國三十七年濟東印書社排印本.

Zhuangzi wenxuan 莊子文選, (近人) Zhang Mosheng 張默生撰. 據民國三十七年濟東印書社排印《先秦諸子文選》本.

Zhuangzi xinzheng 莊子新證, 2 juan, (近人) Yu Xingwu 于省吾撰. 據民國二十九年北京大業印刷局排印《雙劍誃諸子新證》本.

Zhuangzi xuanzhu 莊子選註, (近人) Shen Dehong 沈德鴻撰. 據民國十五年排印《學生國學叢書》本.

Zhuangzi zhexue 莊子哲學, (近人) Jiang Xichang 蔣錫昌撰. 據民國二十六年上海商務印書館排印本.

Zhuangzi shiyi 莊子釋義, (近人) Zhang Xu 張栩撰. 民國間《古學叢刊》第二、四、五、六、七期.

Zhuangzi zhupian kaobian 莊子諸篇考辨, (近人) Jiang Fucong 蔣復璁撰. 據民國油印本.

Zhuangzi Xiaoyaoyou jianglu 莊子逍遙遊講錄, 等, (近人) Zheng Dian 鄭奠輯錄. 據民國排印本.

Zhuangzi Tianxia pian jianzheng 莊子天下篇箋證, (近人) Gao Heng 高亨撰. 據民國油印本.

Zhuangzi jinjian 莊子今箋, (近人) Gao Heng 高亨撰. 民國二十四年開封歧文齋刊《諸子今箋》本.

Zhuangzi Tianxia pian yaoquan 莊子天下篇要詮, (近人) Wang Quchang 王蘧常撰. 據民國二十五年上海中華書局排印《諸子學派要詮》本.

Zhuangzi yanjiu 莊子研究, (近人) Ye Guoqing 葉國慶撰. 民國二十五年上海商務印書館排印《國學小叢書》本.

Zhuangzi jinghua 莊子精華, (民國) 上海中華書局編. 民國三十年上海中華書局排印本.

Zhuangzi jiangjie 莊子講解, (近人) Zhang Yihui 張貽惠撰. 據民國三十五年綜合學術社排印本.

Zhuangzi Tianxia pian huishi 莊子天下篇薈釋, (近人) Shan Yanyi 單晏一撰. 據民國三十七年西安黎明日報社排印本.

Zhuangzi jiaozheng 莊子校證, (近人) Yang Mingzhao 楊明照撰. 據民國二十六年排印《燕京學報》第二十一期.

Zhuangzi jiaoshi 莊子校釋, 5 juan, (近人) Wang Shumin 王叔岷撰. 民國三十六年上海商務印書館依手稿影印本.

Guo Xiang Zhuangzi zhu jiaoji 郭象莊子注校記, 5 juan, (近人) Wang Shumin 王叔岷撰. 據1950年上海商務印書館排印本.

Dunhuang Zhuangzi canjuan 敦煌莊子殘卷, 附黑水城莊子殘本, (今人) Ye Beiqing 葉蓓卿輯.

Dunhuang Zhuangzi canjuan 敦煌莊子殘卷 (Dunhuang Zhuangzi Fragments) is based on the publications Dunhuang baozang 敦煌寶藏 (Dunhuang Treasures) (Taiwan: Xinwenfeng Publishing Co.), Dunhuang Manuscripts in the British Collection 英藏敦煌文獻 (Sichuan People’s Publishing House), Dunhuang and Western Regions Manuscripts in the Collection of the National Library of France 法國國家圖書館藏敦煌西域文獻 (Shanghai Classics Publishing House), and Dunhuang Manuscripts in the Collection of the Institute of Oriental Studies, Russian Academy of Sciences, Saint Petersburg Branch 俄羅斯科學院東方研究所聖彼得堡分所藏敦煌文獻 (Shanghai Classics Publishing House).

Heishui cheng Zhuangzi canben 黑水城莊子殘本 - the Khara-Khoto (Black Water City) Zhuangzi Fragment is based on the publication 俄羅斯科學院東方研究所聖彼得堡分所藏黑水城文獻 (Khara-Khoto Manuscripts in the Collection of the Institute of Oriental Studies, Russian Academy of Sciences, Saint Petersburg Branch) (Shanghai Classics Publishing House).

==== Qinding Siku quanshu ====
Texts listed in the section Zhuangzi 庄子, in: ctext.org: 钦定四库全书 / Qinding Siku quanshu:

Table of contents (Qinding Siku quanshu 钦定四库全书)

Zhuangzi 庄子 20 juan 梁漆园吏 Zhuang Zhou (author)，晋散骑常侍 Xiang Xiu 向秀 (comm.); 16 juan Sima Biao 司马彪 (comm.); 10 juan Cui Zhuan 崔撰 (comm.); 10 juan Guo Xiang 郭象 (comm.); 30 juan Jin 晋 Li Yi 李颐 (comm.); 18 juan Meng shi 孟氏 (comm.); 10 juan Yang Shangshan 杨上善 (comm.); 12 juan Lu Cangyong 卢藏用 (comm.); 10 juan Daoist priest 道士 Wen Ruhai 文如海 (comm.); 30 juan Cheng Yuanying 成元英 (comm.); 10 juan Zhang Zhao 张昭 (supplementary comm.); 15 juan Sijia 四家 (comm.); 20 juan Li Yi 李颐 Jijie 集解, 20 juan Wang Yuangu 王元古 Jijie 集解
Zhuangzi yin 庄子音 1 juan Li Gui 李轨 (author); 3 juan Xu Miao 徐邈 (author); 3 juan Guo Xiang 郭象 (author); 1 juan Wang Mu 王穆 (author)

Zhiyin 直音, 1 juan, Jia Shanyi 贾善翊 (author); Zhuyin 注音, 1 juan, Sima Biao 司马彪 (author)
Waipian zayin 外篇杂音, 1 juan
Neipian yinyi 内篇音义, 1 juan

Zhuangzi jiangshu 庄子讲疏, 30 juan, Liang Jianwen di 梁简文帝 (author); 2 juan, Zhang Ji 张机 (author); 8 juan
Zhuangzi yishu 庄子义疏, 3 juan, 宋处士 Li Shuzhi 李叔之 (author); 8 juan, Dai Shen 戴诜 (author); 10 juan, Wang Mu 王穆 (author); 12 juan, 道士 Cheng Yuanying 成元英 (author)
Zhuangzi Neipian jiangshu 庄子内篇讲疏, 8 juan, Zhou Hongzheng 周宏正 (author)
Zhuangzi wenjuyi 庄子文句义, 28 juan
Zhuangzi wenjuyi 庄子文句义, 20 juan, Lu Deming 陆德明 (author)
Zhuangzi guwen zhengyi 庄子古文正义, 10 juan, Feng Kuo 冯廓 (author)
Nanhua lun 南华论, 25 juan, Liang Kuang 梁旷 (author)
Nanhua lun yin 南华论音, 3 juan
Zhuangzi lun 庄子论, 2 juan, Li Chong 李充 (author)
Zhuangzi zhiyao 庄子指要, 33 pian, Zhang Jiugai 张九垓 (author)
Nanhua xianwen Zhuangzi lun 南华仙人庄子论, 30 juan, Liang Kuang 梁旷 (author)
Zhuangzi Neiyao 庄子内要, 1 juan
Nanhua zhenjing pianmu 南华真经篇目, 3 juan
Zhuangzi yushi 庄子馀事, 1 juan, Chen Jingxian 陈景先 (author)
Zhuangzi tonglüe 庄子统畧, 3 juan
Nanhua xiangwu shuo 南华象㒺说, 10 juan, Zhang Youchao 张游朝 (author)
Nanhua tongwei 南华通微, 10 juan, Yuan Zai 元载 (author)
Nanhua zhenjing tigang 南华真经提纲, 1 juan, Wang Xiao 王晓 (author)
Zhuangzi tongzhen lun 庄子通真论, 3 juan, (Tang) Jia Canliao 贾参寥 (author)
Zhuangzi miao 庄子邈, 1 juan
Nanhua zongzhang 南华总章, 1 juan, Bi Xuzi 碧虚子 (author)
Nanhua zhangju 南华章句, 7 juan, Bi Xuzi 碧虚子 (author)

(abbreviations: zhu 注 = comm./commentary; zhuan 撰 = author; etc.)

==== Chinese Text Project ====
Texts listed in the section Zhuangzi 庄子 in: ctext.org: 庄子 (with partial translation):

Table of contents (ctext.org)
- Nanhua zhenjing 南華真經 (Jin) Guo Xiang zhu 郭象注; (Tang) Lu Deming yinyi 陸德明音義；Sun Yuxiu zhaji 孫毓修撰札記: Sibu congkan chubian 四部叢刊初編 edition, vols. 534–538. 景上海涵芬樓藏明刊本. 本書十卷，坿札記一卷.
- Nanhua zhenjing 南華真經: Xu Guyi congshu 續古逸叢書 edition, vols. 8–12.
- Nanhua zhenjing zhushu 南華真經注疏 (Jin) Guo Xiang zhu 郭象注. In the original book, some characters are unclear, and some pages of the ancient text are damaged.
- Nanhua zhenjing zhushu 南華真經註疏: Guyi congshu 古逸叢書 edition.
- Nanhua jingjie 南華經解 (Qing) Xuan Ying 宣穎撰. In the original book, some characters are unclear, and some pages of the ancient text are damaged.
- Zhuangzi kouyi 莊子口義 (Song) Lin Xiyi 林希逸: Qinding Siku quanshu 欽定四庫全書 edition. 本書10卷，拆分成9冊. 子部十四·道家類.
- Nanhua zhenjing xinzhuan 南華真經新傳 (Song) Wang Pang 王雱: Qinding Siku quanshu 欽定四庫全書 edition. 本書19卷，拆分成4冊. 子部十四·道家類.
- Nanhua zhenjing yihai zuanwei 南華真經義海纂微 (Song) Chu Boxiu 褚伯秀: Qinding Siku quanshu 欽定四庫全書 edition. 本書106卷，拆分成19冊. 子部十四·道家類.
- Zhuangzi 莊子 (Zhou) Zhuang Zhou 莊周: Chizaotang Siku quanshu huiyao 摛藻堂四庫全書薈要 edition. 本書10卷，拆分成5冊. 子部·墨家類·道家類.
- Zhuangzi zhu 莊子注 (Jin) Guo Xiang 郭象. Qinding Siku quanshu 欽定四庫全書 edition. 本書10卷，拆分成4冊. 子部十四·道家類.
- Zhuangzi jiegu 莊子解故. Zhangshi congshu 章氏叢書 edition.
- Zhuangzi jijie 莊子集解 Wang Xianqian 王先謙. In the original book, some characters are unclear, and some pages of the ancient text are damaged.
- Zhuangzi jishi 莊子集釋 （Qing）Guo Qingfan 郭慶藩. In the original book, some characters are unclear, and some pages of the ancient text are damaged.
- Nanhua zhenjing pangzhu 南華真經旁注 (Ming) Fang Xuming 方虛名. In the original book, some characters are unclear, and some pages of the ancient text are damaged.
- Zhuangzi 莊子 (Zhou) Zhuang Zhou 莊周: Qianlong yulan Siku quanshu huiyao 乾隆御覽四庫全書薈要 edition. 本書10卷，拆分成5冊. 子部.
- Zhuangzi zhu 莊子注. Sima Biao 司馬彪: Wenjingtang congshu 問經堂叢書 edition.
- Zhuangzi yi 莊子翼 (Ming) Jiao Hong 焦竑: Qinding Siku quanshu 欽定四庫全書 edition. 本書8卷，拆分成7冊. 子部十四·道家類.
- Zhuangzi yi 莊子翼: Jinling congshu 金陵叢書 edition.
- Zhuangzi jie 莊子解: Chuanshan yishu 船山遺書 edition.
- Zhuangzi tong 莊子通 (Ming) Shen Yiguan 沈一貫. In the original book, some characters are unclear, and some pages of the ancient text are damaged.

==== Zhengtong Daozang ====
Zhuangzi-related texts listed in the Zhengtong Daozang (Daoist Canon of the Zhengtong Reign) 正統道藏 (Wikisource):

Table of contents (Zhengtong Daozang 正統道藏)
- Nanhua zhenjing yihai zuanwei 南華真經義海纂微, Chu Boxiu 褚伯秀 編撰, 106 juan
- Nanhua zhenjing kouyi 南華真經口義, Lin Xiyi 林希逸 註, 32 juan
- Nanhua zhenjing zhangju yinyi 南華真經章句音義, Chen Jingyuan 陳景元 撰, 14 juan
- Nanhua zhenjing zhangju yushi 南華真經章句餘事, Chen Jingyuan 陳景元 撰, 1 juan
- Nanhua zhenjing yushi zalu 南華真經餘事雜錄, Chen Jingyuan 陳景元 編, 2 juan
- Nanhua zhenjing zhiyin 南華真經直音, Jia Shanxiang 賈善翔 撰, 1 juan
- Nanhua miao 南華邈, 1 juan
- Zhuangzi neipian dingzheng 莊子內篇訂正, Wu Cheng 吳澄 編, 2 juan
- Nanhua zhenjing xunben 南華真經循本, Luo Miandao 羅勉道 撰, 30 juan
- Nanhua zhenjing xinzhuan 南華真經新傳, Wang Pang 王雱 撰, 20 juan
- Nanhua zhenjing shiyi 南華真經拾遺, Wang Pang 王雱 撰, 1 juan
- Nanhua zhenjing zhushu 南華真經註疏, Guo Xiang 郭象 (zhu), Cheng Xuanying 成玄英 (shu), 35 juan
- Zhuangzi yi 莊子翼, Jiao Hong 焦竑 編撰, 8 juan

(see also The Taoist Canon – A Historical Companion to the Daozang, vol. 2, pp. 671-681: The Zhuangzi)

==== Zhuangzi jinzhu jinyi ====
Texts used by Chen Guying 陈鼓应 in his Zhuangzi jinzhu jinyi 庄子今注今译 (roughly in chronological order). - Online (Beijing 2007, 2 vols., pp. 1042-1043):

Table of contents (texts used in Zhuangzi jinzhu jinyi 庄子今注今译)

Guo Xiang 郭象: Zhuangzi zhu 庄子注
Lu Deming 陆德明: Jingdian shiwen Zhuangzi yinyi 经典释文庄子音义
Cheng Xuanying 成玄英: Zhuangzi shu 庄子疏
Lü Huiqing 吕惠卿: Zhuangzi yi 庄子义
Chen Jingyuan 陈景元: Nanhua zhenjing zhangju yinyi 南华真经章句音义
Wang Yuanze 王元泽: Nanhua zhenjing xinzhuan 南华真经新传
Lin Xiyi 林希逸: Nanhua zhenjing kouyi 南华真经口义
Chu Boxiu 褚伯秀: Nanhua zhenjing yihai zuanwei 南华真经义海纂微
Luo Miandao 罗勉道: Nanhua zhenjing xunben 南华真经循本
Jiao Hong 焦竑: Zhuangzi yi 庄子翼
Chen Shen 陈深: Zhuangzi pinjie 庄子品节
Shi Deqing 释德清: Zhuangzi neipian zhu 庄子内篇注
Fang Yizhi 方以智: Yaodi pao Zhuang 药地炮庄
Lin Yunming 林云铭: Zhuangzi yin 庄子因
Wang Fuzhi 王夫之: Zhuangzi jie 庄子解
Yiying 宜颖: Nanhua jingjie 南华经解
Xu Tinghuai 徐廷槐: Nanhua jianchao 南华简钞
Pu Qilong 浦起龙: Zhuangzi chao 庄子钞
Wang Maobie 王懋蛂: Zhuangzi cunjiao 庄子存校
Hu Wenying 胡文英: Zhuangzi dujian 庄子独见
Zhou Gongchen 周拱辰: Nanhua zhenjing yingshi 南华真经影史
Yao Er 姚而: Zhuangzi zhangyi 庄子章义
Wang Niansun 王念孙: Zhuangzi zazhi 庄子杂志
Fang Qian 方潜: Nanhua jingjie 南华经解
Wang Lüyun 王闾运: Zhuangzi neipian zhu 庄子内篇注
Yu Yue 俞樾: Zhuangzi pingyi 庄子平议
Liu Fengbao 刘凤苞: Nanhua xuexin bian 南华雪心编
Chen Shouchang 陈寿昌: Nanhua zhenjing zhengyi 南华真经正义
Ma Qichang 马其昶: Zhuangzi gu 庄子故
Sun Zhijiang 孙治让: Zhuangzi zhaiyi 庄子札迻
Guo Qingfan 郭庆藩: Zhuangzi jishi 庄子集释
Wu Rulin 吴汝纶: Zhuangzi diankan 庄子点勘
Wang Xianqian 王先谦: Zhuangzi jijie 庄子集解
Zhang Binglin 章炳麟: Zhuangzi jiegu 庄子解故
Tao Hongqing 陶鸿庆: Du Zhuangzi zhaji 读庄子札记
Liu Shipei 刘师培: Zhuangzi zhenbu 庄子斟补
Lin Shu 林纾: Zhuangzi qianshuo 庄子浅说
Wu Yanxu 武延绪: Zhuangzi zhaji 庄子札记
Xi Tong 奚侗: Zhuangzi buzhu 庄子补注
Zhu Guiyao 朱桂曜: Zhuangzi neipian zhengbu 庄子内篇证补
Ma Xulun 马叙伦: Zhuangzi yizheng 庄子义证
Ding Zhancheng 丁展成: Zhuangzi yinyi yi 庄子音义绎
Jiang Xichang 蒋锡昌: Zhuangzi zhexue 庄子哲学
Liu Wendian 刘文典: Zhuangzi buzheng 庄子补正
Wang Shumin 王叔岷: Zhuangzi jiaoshi 庄子校释
Hu Huaichen 胡怀琛: Zhuangzi jijie buzheng 庄子集解补正
Gao Heng 高亨: Zhuangzi xinjian 庄子新笺
Qian Shengwu 千省吾: Zhuangzi xinzheng 庄子新证
Yang Shuda 杨树达: Zhuangzi shiyi 庄子拾遗
Wang Zhixin 王治心: Zhuangzi yanjiu ji zhushi 庄子研究及注释
Ye Yulin 叶玉麟: Baihua Zhuangzi duben 白话庄子读本
Cao Shoukūn 曹受坤: Zhuangzi zhexue 庄子哲学
Zhang Mosheng 张默生: Zhuangzi xinshi 庄子新释
Wen Yiduo 闻一多: Zhuangzi neipian jiaoshi 庄子内篇校释
Liu Wu 刘武: Zhuangzi jijie neipian buzheng 庄子集解内篇补正
Qian Mu 钱穆: Zhuangzi zuanjian 庄子纂笺
Guan Feng 关锋: Zhuangzi neipian yijie he pipan 庄子内篇译解和批判
Yan Lingfeng 严灵峰: Daojia sizhi xinbian 道家四子新编
Li Zhongyu 李钟豫: Yuti Zhuangzi 语体庄子
Chen Qitian 陈启天: Zhuangzi qianshuo 庄子浅说
Zhang Chengqiu 张成秋: Zhuangzi pianmu kao 庄子篇目考
Li Mian 李勉: Zhuangzi zonglun ji fenpian pingzhu 庄子总论及分篇评注
Huang Jinzhu 黄锦铢: Xinyi Zhuangzi duben 新译庄子读本
Fukunaga Mitsuji 福永光司: Sōshi 庄子（日本·朝日新闻社）
Kanaya Osamu 金谷治: Sōshi 庄子（日本·岩波文库）
Cao Chuji 曹础基: Zhuangzi qianzhu 庄子浅注
Wang Shumin 王叔岷: Zhuangzi jiaoquan 庄子校诠
Yang Liuqiao 杨柳桥: Zhuangzi yigu 庄子译诂

==== Zhuangzi fuyuan ben (bibliography) ====
Texts used by Zhang Yuanshan in the section Jiu Zhuangxue yaomu 旧庄学要目 of his Zhuangzi fuyuan ben 庄子復原本 (roughly in chronological order). - Zhang Yuanshan 张远山: Zhuangzi fuyuan ben 庄子復原本 (abb. ZZFYB) (2 vols., Beijing 2021, pp. 1110-1116):

Table of contents (ZZFYB: Jiu Zhuangxue yaomu 旧庄学要目)

1．Wei–Jin Sima Biao (司马彪) (?–306), Zhuangzi (quan) zhu (庄子（全）注). Lost. Quoted in the Tang Lu Deming (陆德明), Zhuangzi yinyi (庄子音义), and in Li Shan (李善), Wenxuan zhu (文选注), among others.
2．Wei–Jin Meng shi (孟氏), Zhuangzi (quan) zhu (庄子（全）注). Lost. Recorded in Lu Deming (陆德明), Zhuangzi yinyi (庄子音义).
3．Wei–Jin Cui Zhuan (崔譔), Zhuangzi (xuan) zhu (庄子（选）注). Lost. Quoted in Lu Deming (陆德明), Zhuangzi yinyi (庄子音义).
4．Wei–Jin Xiang Xiu (向秀) (227–272), Zhuangzi (xuan) zhu (庄子（选）注). Lost. Quoted in Zhang Zhan (张湛), Liezi zhu (列子注), and in Lu Deming (陆德明), Zhuangzi yinyi (庄子音义), among others.
5．Western Jin Guo Xiang (郭象) (252–312), Zhuangzi zhu (庄子注) (revised and rearranged; not a selective commentary; abbreviated here as “Guo zhu” 郭注). The only extant complete edition today.
6．Western Jin Li Yi (李颐), Zhuangzi jijie (庄子集解). Lost. Quoted in Lu Deming (陆德明), Zhuangzi yinyi (庄子音义). From Li Yi onward, commentators used Guo Xiang’s revised edition of the Zhuangzi as their base text.
7．Eastern Jin Wang Tanzhi (王坦之) (330–375), Fei Zhuang lun (废庄论).
8．Liu Song (Southern Dynasties), Zhuangzi, Yuanjia edition (庄子元嘉本). Lost. Quoted in Lu Deming (陆德明), Zhuangzi yinyi (庄子音义).
9．Tang Lu Deming (陆德明) (ca.550–630), Jingdian shiwen (经典释文), including Zhuangzi yinyi (庄子音义) (abbreviated here as “Lu shi” 陆释). Overall faithful to Guo Xiang’s reverse commentary (fanzhu 反注), but frequently citing variant readings from the editions of Sima Biao, Cui Zhuan, Xiang Xiu, Li Yi, the Yuanjia edition, and Guo Xiang. Of highest textual value.
10．Tang Cheng Xuanying (成玄英) (c. 601 – c. 690, Daoist priest), Nanhua zhenjing zhu shu (南华真经注疏) (abbreviated here as “Cheng shu” 成疏). Overall faithful to Guo Xiang’s reverse commentary, with slight revisions.
11．Tang Wen Ruhai (文如海) (Daoist priest under Emperor Xuanzong), Zhuangzi zhengyi (庄子正义). Lost. Quoted in Chen Jingyuan (陈景元), Zhuangzi quewu (庄子阙误).
12．Tang (Dunhuang manuscript) 敦煌唐写本, Dunhuang manuscript copy of the Guo Xiang edition.
13．Tang Li Xi (李磎) (jinshi 859), Guang Fei Zhuang lun (广废庄论).
14．Northern Song Wang Anshi (王安石) (1021–1086), Zhuang Zhou lun (庄周论).
15．Northern Song Chen Jingyuan (陈景元) (1025–1094, Daoist priest, style name Bixuzi 碧虚子), Nanhua zhenjing zhangju yinyi (南华真经章句音义), with the appended Zhuangzi quewu (庄子阙误).
16．Northern Song Lü Huiqing (吕惠卿) (1032–1111), Zhuangzi yi (庄子义). Lost. Quoted in Chu Boxiu (褚伯秀), Nanhua zhenjing yihai zuanwei (南华真经义海纂微).
17．Northern Song Su Shi (苏轼) (1037–1101), Zhuangzi citang ji (庄子祠堂记).
18．Northern Song Chen Xiangdao (陈详道), Zhuangzi zhu (庄子注). Lost. Quoted in Chu Boxiu (褚伯秀), Nanhua zhenjing yihai zuanwei (南华真经义海纂微).
19．Northern Song Lin Zi (林自, style name Yidu 疑独), Zhuangzi zhu (庄子注). Lost. Quoted in Chu Boxiu (褚伯秀), Nanhua zhenjing yihai zuanwei (南华真经义海纂微).
20．Northern Song Wang Pang (王雱) (1044–1076, style name Fuze 符泽, son of Wang Anshi), Nanhua zhenjing xin zhuan (南华真经新传).
21．Southern Song Zhao Yifu (赵以夫) (1189–1256), Zhuangzi neipian zhu (庄子内篇注). Lost. Quoted in Chu Boxiu (褚伯秀), Nanhua zhenjing yihai zuanwei (南华真经义海纂微).
22．Southern Song Lin Xiyi (林希逸) (1193–?), Zhuangzi kouyi (庄子口义).
23．Southern Song Li Shibiao (李士表), Zhuangzi jiu lun (庄子九论). Lost. Quoted in Chu Boxiu (褚伯秀), Nanhua zhenjing yihai zuanwei (南华真经义海纂微).
24．Southern Song Chu Boxiu (褚伯秀), Nanhua zhenjing yihai zuanwei (南华真经义海纂微). The Siku tiyao (四库提要) states that the book compiles the views of thirteen scholars, including Guo Xiang, Lü Huiqing, Lin Yidu, Chen Xiangdao, Chen Jingyuan, Wang Pang, Liu Gai (刘概), Wu Chou (吴俦), Zhao Yifu, Lin Xiyi, Li Shibiao, Wang Dan (王旦), and Fan Yuanying (范元应), adding his own judgments, which he calls “guan jian” 管见.
25．Southern Song Luo Miandao (罗勉道), Nanhua zhenjing xun ben (南华真经循本).
26．Southern Song Wang Yinglin (王应麟) (1223–1296), Kunxue jiwen (困学纪闻), juan 10, Zhuangzi yipian (庄子逸篇). He collected 39 lost passages of the Zhuangzi from sources such as Shishuo xinyu (世说新语), Wenxuan (文选), Hou Hanshu (后汉书) commentaries, Yiwen leiju (艺文类聚), and Taiping yulan (太平御览), pioneering the recovery of lost Zhuangzi texts.
27．Southern Song Liu Chenweng (刘辰翁) (1231–1297), Zhuangzi Nanhua zhenjing dianjiao (庄子南华真经点校).
28．Yuan Wu Cheng (吴澄) (1249–1333), Zhuangzi neipian dingzheng (庄子内篇订正).
29．Yuan Miao Shanshi (苗善时), Nanhua jing gongan (南华经公案) (items 43–55 of Xuanjiao da gongan 玄教大公案).
30．Yuan Japanese Kozanji manuscript (高山寺古钞本), a copy of the Guo Xiang edition, with Guo’s postface appended (deleted in later Chinese editions).
31．Ming Song Lian (宋濂) (1310–1381), Zhuangzi bian (庄子辨).
32．Ming Yang Shen (杨慎) (1488–1559), Zhuangzi jie (庄子解), Zhuangzi quewu (庄子阙误), Zhuangzi nanzi (庄子难字).
33．Ming Lu Xixing (陆西星) (1520–ca.1601, style name Changgeng 长庚), Nanhua zhenjing fumo (南华真经副墨), completed 1560.
34．Ming Zhu Dezhi (朱得之) (1485–?, disciple of Wang Yangming), Zhuangzi tongyi (庄子通义), completed 1578.
35．Ming Shi Xing (释性), Nanhua fafu (南华发覆), completed 1566.
36．Ming Chen Shen (陈深) (jinshi 1549), Zhuangzi pinjie (庄子品节).
37．Ming Gui Youguang (归有光) (1506–1571), Zhuangzi shiyi (庄子释意), Nanhua zhenjing pingzhu (南华真经评注).
38．Ming Tang Shunzhi (唐顺之) (1507–1560), Nanhua jing shilue (南华经释略).
39．Ming Wang Shizhen (王世贞) (1526–1590), Du Zhuangzi (读庄子), Nanhua jing pingdian (南华经评点).
40．Ming Li Zhi (李贽) (1527–1602), Zhuangzi jie (庄子解).
41．Ming Zhang Siwei (张四维), Zhuangzi kouyi buzhu (庄子口义补注).
42．Ming Shen Yiguan (沈一贯) (1531–1615, style name Jianwu 肩吾), Zhuangzi tong (庄子通), completed 1588.
43．Ming Jiao Hong (焦竑) (1540–1620), Zhuangzi yi (庄子翼), completed 1588.
44．Ming Li Guangjin (李光缙) (1549–1623), Nanhua fujie (南华肤解).
45．Ming Chen Jiru (陈继儒) (1558–1639), Zhuangzi leiyu (庄子类语), Zhuangzi cui (庄子粹), Zhuangzi jun (庄子隽).
46．Ming Zhong Xing (钟惺) (1574–1624), Zhuangzi langhuan (庄子嫏嬛), Zhuangzi wengui (庄子文归).
47．Ming Shi Deqing (释德清) (1546–1623, sobriquet Hanshan 憨山), Zhuangzi neipian zhu (庄子内篇注).
48．Ming Yang Qiyuan (杨起元) (1547–1599), Nanhua jing pinjie (南华经品节).
49．Ming Guo Lianghan (郭良翰) (Vice Minister of the Court of Imperial Stud during the Wanli reign), Nanhua jing huijie (南华经荟解).
50．Ming Pan Qiqing (潘其庆), Nanhua jing jizhu (南华经集注).
51．Ming Hu Yinglin (胡应麟) (1551–1602, style name Furuo 符瑞), Jiuliu xulun (九流绪论).
52．Ming Yuan Hongdao (袁宏道) (1568–1610, style name Zhonglang 中郎), Guang Zhuang (广庄).
53．Ming Yuan Zhongdao (袁中道) (1570–1623, style name Xiaoxiu 小修), Dao Zhuang (导庄).
54．Ming Tao Wangling (陶望龄) (1562–1609), Jie Zhuang (解庄).
55．Ming Li Tengfang (李腾芳) (1573–1633, jinshi 1592), Shuo Zhuang (说庄), cited in Fang Yizhi (方以智), Yaodi pao Zhuang (药地炮庄).
56．Ming Tan Yuanchun (谭元春) (1586–1637), Zhuangzi Nanhua zhenjing ping (庄子南华真经评).
57．Ming Chen Zhian (陈治安) (jinshi 1622), Nanhua zhenjing benyi (南华真经本义).
58．Ming Zhou Gongchen (周拱辰), Nanhua zhenjing yingshi (南华真经影史), completed 1637.
59．Ming Cheng Yining (程以宁), Nanhua zhenjing zhu shu (南华真经注疏), preface dated 1637.
60．Ming Fang Xuming (方虚名), Nanhua zhenjing pangzhu (南华真经旁注).
61．Ming Chen Rongxuan (陈荣选), Nanhua jing jujie (南华经句解).
62．Ming loyalist Juelang Daosheng (觉浪道盛) (1592–1659, teacher of Fang Yizhi), Zhuangzi tizheng (庄子提正).
63．Ming loyalist Fu Shan (傅山) (1607–168?, style name Qingzhu 青主), Pidian Zhuangzi (批点庄子).
64．Ming loyalist Fang Yizhi (方以智) (1611–1671), Yaodi pao Zhuang (药地炮庄), written after the Ming–Qing transition.
65．Ming loyalist Qian Chengzhi (钱澄之) (1612–1693), Zhuangzi gu (庄子诂), cited in Fang Yizhi, Yaodi pao Zhuang (药地炮庄).
66．Ming loyalist Langting Jingting (俍亭净挺) (1615–1684), Qiyuan zhitong (漆园指通).
67．Ming loyalist Wang Fuzhi (王夫之) (1619–1692), Zhuangzi jie (庄子解), Zhuangzi tong (庄子通).
68．Early Qing Jin Shengtan (金圣叹) (1608–1661), Diyi caizi shu (第一才子书).
69．Early Qing Hu Wenwei (胡文蔚), Nanhua jing hezhu chuiying (南华经合注吹影).
70．Early Qing Fang Renjie (方人杰), Zhuangzi duben (庄子读本).
71．Early Qing Lin Yunming (林云铭) (1628–1697), Zhuangzi yin (庄子因), preface dated 1688.
72．Early Qing Wang Yu (王敔) (1656–1730, son of Wang Fuzhi), Zhuangzi zengzhu (庄子增注).
73．Early Qing Gao Qiuyue (高秋月) and Cao Tongchun (曹同春), Zhuangzi shiyi (庄子释意).
74．Qing Cangyun shanfang zhuren (藏云山房主人), Nanhua jing dayi jie xuan canzhu (南华经大意解悬参注).
75．Qing Wu Shishang (吴世尚), Zhuangzi jie (庄子解).
76．Qing Lin Zhongyi (林仲懿) (jinshi 1711), Nanhua benyi (南华本义).
77．Qing Wang Maohong (王懋竑) (1668–1741, Kangxi jinshi), Zhuangzi cunxiao (庄子存校).
78．Qing Pu Qilong (浦起龙) (1679–1762), Zhuangzi chao (庄子钞).
79．Qing Liu Dakui (刘大櫆) (1698–1779), Zhuangzi pingdian (庄子评点).
80．Qing Sun Jiagan (孙嘉淦) (1683–1753, jinshi 1713), Nanhua tong (南华通).
81．Qing Fang Zhengyuan (方正瑗) (grandson of Fang Yizhi, juren 1720), Fangzhai bu Zhuang (方斋补庄), preface dated 1737.
82．Qing Xuan Ying (宣颖), Nanhua jingjie (南华经解), preface by Zhang Fang (张芳), 1721.
83．Qing Xu Tinghuai (徐廷槐) (jinshi 1730), Nanhua jianchao (南华简钞).
84．Qing Lu Wenchao (卢文弨) (1717–1796, jinshi 1752), Zhuangzi yinyi kaozheng (庄子音义考证).
85．Qing Yao Nai (姚鼐) (1732–1815, jinshi 1763), Zhuangzi zhangyi (庄子章义).
86．Qing Hu Wenying (胡文英) (gongsheng 1765), Zhuangzi dujian (庄子独见), self-preface dated 1752.
87．Qing Lu Shuzhi (陆树芝) (juren 1780), Zhuangzi xue (庄子雪), preface dated 1796.
88．Qing Wang Niansun (王念孙) (1744–1832), Dushu zazhi·Zhuangzi (读书杂志·庄子).
89．Qing Weng Yuanqi (翁元圻) (1751–1825), Zhuangzi yipian zhu (庄子逸篇注).
90．Qing Wang Yinzhi (王引之) (1766–183?, son of Wang Niansun), Dushu zazhi·Zhuangzi (读书杂志·庄子), Jingzhuan shici (经传释词).
91．Qing Hong Yixuan (洪颐煊) (1765–1837), Zhuangzi conglu (庄子丛录).
92．Qing Jiang Yougao (江有诰) (1773–1851), Zhuangzi yundu (庄子韵读).
93．Qing Wan Xihuai (万希槐), Zhuangzi yipian jizheng (庄子逸篇集证).
94．Qing Sun Fengyi (孙冯翼) (nephew of Sun Xingyan 孙星衍), Sima Biao Zhuangzi zhu (司马彪庄子注).
95．Qing Mao Panlin (茆泮林) (?–1845), Zhuangzi Sima Biao zhu kaoyi (庄子司马彪注考逸).
96．Qing Zhu Junsheng (朱骏声) (1788–1858), Shuowen tongxun dingsheng (说文通训定声), frequently discussing Zhuangzi phonology and meaning.
97．Qing Fang Qian (方潜) (1805–1868), Nanhua jingjie (南华经解).
98．Qing Guo Songtao (郭嵩焘) (1818–1891), Zhuangzi zhu (庄子注), uncle of Guo Qingfan (郭庆藩).
99．Qing Yu Yue (俞樾) (1821–1907, sobriquet Quyuan jushi 曲园居士), Zhuangzi pingyi (庄子平议), Zhuangzi renming kao (庄子人名考).
100．Qing Liu Fengbao (刘凤苞) (1826–1905, jinshi 1865), Nanhua xuexin bian (南华雪心编), printed 1892.
101．Qing Liu Hongdian (刘鸿典) (jinshi 1868), Zhuangzi yuejie (庄子约解).
102．Late Qing Wang Kaiyun (王闿运) (1832–1916), Zhuangzi neiza pian zhu (庄子内杂篇注).
103．Late Qing Chen Shouchang (陈寿昌), Nanhua zhenjing zhengyi (南华真经正义).
104．Late Qing Yang Wenhui (杨文会) (1837–1911), Nanhua jing fayin (南华经发隐).
105．Late Qing Wu Rulun (吴汝纶) (1840–1903), Zhuangzi diankan (庄子点勘).
106．Late Qing Guo Qingfan (郭庆藩) (1844–1896, nephew of Guo Songtao), Zhuangzi jishi (庄子集释).
107．Late Qing Wang Xianqian (王先谦) (1842–1917), Zhuangzi jijie (庄子集解).
108．Late Qing Sun Yirang (孙诒让) (1848–1908), Zhuangzi zhayi (庄子札迻).
109．Late Qing Lin Shu (林纾) (1852–1924), Zhuangzi qianshuo (庄子浅说).
110．Late Qing Yan Fu (严复) (1853–1921), Zhuangzi pingdian (庄子评点).
111．Late Qing Yu Chang (于鬯) (1854–1910), Zhuangzi jiaoshu (庄子校书).
112．Late Qing Ma Qichang (马其昶) (1855–1930), Zhuangzi gu (庄子故).
113．Late Qing Wu Yanxu (武延绪) (1857–1916, jinshi 1892), Zhuangzi zhaji (庄子札记).
114．Late Qing Zhang Binglin (章炳麟) (1869–1936, sobriquet Taiyan 太炎), Zhuangzi jiegu (庄子解故), Qiwu lun shi (齐物论释).
115．Late Qing Hu Yuanjun (胡远浚) (1869–1933), Zhuangzi quangu (庄子诠诂).
116．Late Qing Ruan Yusong (阮毓崧) (1870–1951), Zhuangzi jizhu (庄子集注).
117．Late Qing Liang Qichao (梁启超) (1873–1929), Zhuangzi tianxia pian shiyi (庄子天下篇释义), 1926.
118．Late Qing Xi Tong (奚侗) (1878–1939), Zhuangzi buzhu (庄子补注).
119．Late Qing Hu Pu'an (胡朴安) (1878–1947), Zhuangzi zhangyi (庄子章义).
120．Late Qing Liu Shipei (刘师培) (1884–1919), Zhuangzi jiaobu (庄子斠补), 1912.
121．Gu Shi (顾实) (1878–1956), Zhuangzi tianxia pian jiangshu (庄子天下篇讲疏).
122．Cao Shoukun (曹受坤) (1879–1959), Zhuangzi neipian jieshuo (庄子内篇解说).
123．Liu Wu (刘武) (1883–1975), Zhuangzi jijie neipian buzheng (庄子集解内篇补正).
124．Wu Chengshi (吴承仕) (1884–1939), Zhuangzi yinyi bianzheng (庄子音义辨证).
125．Ma Xulun (马叙伦) (1885–1970), Zhuangzi yizheng (庄子义证).
126．Yang Shuda (杨树达) (1885–1956), Zhuangzi shiyi (庄子拾遗).
127．Hu Huaichen (胡怀琛) (1886–1938), Zhuangzi jijie buzheng (庄子集解补正).
128．Qian Jibo (钱基博) (1887–1957), Du Zhuangzi tianxia pian shuji (读庄子天下篇疏记).
129．Fang Guang (方光), Zhuangzi tianxia pian shi (庄子天下篇释).
130．Tan Jiefu (谭戒甫) (1887–1974), Zhuangzi tianxia pian jiaoshi (庄子天下篇校释).
131．Zhong Tai (钟泰) (1888–1979), Zhuangzi fawei (庄子发微).
132．Liu Wendian (刘文典) (1889–1958), Zhuangzi buzheng (庄子补正).
133．Chen Zhu (陈柱) (1890–1944), Laozi yu Zhuangzi (老子与庄子), Zhuangzi neipian xue (庄子内篇学), Chan Zhuang (阐庄).
134．Chen Qitian (陈启天) (1893–1984), Zhuangzi qianshuo (庄子浅说).
135．Qian Mu (钱穆) (1895–1990), Zhuangzi zuanjian (庄子纂笺).
136．Zhang Mosheng (张默生) (1895–1979), Zhuangzi xinshi (庄子新释).
137．Yu Xingwu (于省吾) (1896–1984), Zhuangzi xinzheng (庄子新证).
138．Zhu Guiyao (朱桂曜) (1898–1929), Zhuangzi neipian zhengbu (庄子内篇证补).
139．Ding Zhancheng (丁展成), Zhuangzi yinyi yi (庄子音义绎).
140．Zhi Weicheng (支伟成) (1899–1929), Zhuangzi jiaoshi (庄子校释).
141．Wen Yiduo (闻一多) (1899–1946), Zhuangzi neipian jiaoshi (庄子内篇校释), Zhuangzi zhangju (庄子章句), Zhuangzi jiaobu (庄子校补), Zhuangzi yishu (庄子义疏), Zhouyi yu Zhuangzi yanjiu (周易与庄子研究).
142．Wang Xiaoyu (王孝鱼) (1900–1981), Zhuangzi neipian xinjie·Wang Fuzhi Zhuangzi tong shuzheng (庄子内篇新解·王夫之〈庄子通〉疏证).
143．Yan Lingfeng (严灵峰) (1904–1999), Zhuangzi zhangju xinbian (庄子章句新编).
144．Zhou Shaoxian (周绍贤) (1908–1993), Zhuangzi yaoyi (庄子要义).
145．Shan Yanyi (单晏一), Zhuangzi tianxia pian huishi (庄子天下篇荟释).
146．Tao Hongqing (陶鸿庆), Du Zhuangzi zhaji (读庄子札记).
147．Cao Mufan (曹慕樊) (1911–1993), Zhuangzi xinyi (庄子新义).
148．Wang Shumin (王叔岷) (1914–2008), Zhuangzi jiaoshi (庄子校释), Zhuangzi jiaoquan (庄子校诠).
149．Li Mian (李勉), Zhuangzi zonglun ji fenpian pingzhu (庄子总论及分篇评注).
150．Luo Longzhi (罗龙治), Zhexue de tianlai–Zhuangzi (哲学的天籁–庄子).
151．Chen Guying (陈鼓应) (1935–), Zhuangzi jinzhu jinyi (庄子今注今译).
152．Cao Chuji (曹础基) (1937–), Zhuangzi qianzhu (庄子浅注).
153．Fang Yong (方勇) (1956–) and Lu Yongpin (陆永品) (1936–), Zhuangzi quanping (庄子诠评).

See also the ZZFYB-section: Classical texts relevant to the Zhuangzi.

==== Chapter titles ====
Chapter titles of the Guo Xiang edition in 33 chapters, i.e. 7 "inner chapters" (neipian 內篇), 15 "outer chapters" (waipian 外篇), and 11 "miscellaneous chapters" (zapian 雜篇) (following the English translation of Victor H. Mair):

Table of contents (chapter titles of the Guo Xiang edition)

	No.	Title	
	No.	English	Chinese
Inner chapters	1	"Carefree Wandering"	逍遙遊; Xiāoyáo yóu
Inner chapters	2	"On the Equality of Things"	齊物論; Qí wù lùn
Inner chapters	3	"Essentials for Nurturing Life"	養生主; Yǎngshēng zhǔ
Inner chapters	4	"The Human World"	人間世; Rénjiān shì
Inner chapters	5	"Symbols of Integrity Fulfilled"	德充符; Dé chōng fú
Inner chapters	6	"The Great Ancestral Teacher"	大宗師; Dà zōngshī
Inner chapters	7	"Responses for Emperors and Kings"	應帝王; Yìng dì wáng
Outer chapters	8	"Webbed Toes"	駢拇; Piān mǔ
Outer chapters	9	"Horses' Hooves"	馬蹄; Mǎtí
Outer chapters	10	"Ransacking Coffers"	胠篋; Qū qiè
Outer chapters	11	"Preserving and Accepting"	在宥; Zài yòu
Outer chapters	12	"Heaven and Earth"	天地; Tiāndì
Outer chapters	13	"The Way of Heaven"	天道; Tiān dào
Outer chapters	14	"Heavenly Revolutions"	天運; Tiān yùn
Outer chapters	15	"Ingrained Opinions"	刻意; Kè yì
Outer chapters	16	"Mending Nature"	繕性; Shàn xìng
Outer chapters	17	"Autumn Floods"	秋水; Qiū shuǐ
Outer chapters	18	"Ultimate Joy"	至樂; Zhì lè
Outer chapters	19	"Understanding Life"	達生; Dá shēng
Outer chapters	20	"The Mountain Tree"	山木; Shān mù
Outer chapters	21	"Sir Square Field"	田子方; Tiánzǐ fāng
Outer chapters	22	"Knowledge Wanders North"	知北遊; Zhī běi yóu
Misc. chapters	23	"Gengsang Chu"	庚桑楚; Gēngsāng Chǔ
Misc. chapters	24	"Ghostless Xu"	徐無鬼; Xú wúguǐ
Misc. chapters	25	"Sunny"	則陽; Zé yáng
Misc. chapters	26	"External Things"	外物; Wài wù
Misc. chapters	27	"Metaphors"	寓言; Yùyán
Misc. chapters	28	"Abdicating Kingship"	讓王; Ràng wáng
Misc. chapters	29	"Robber Footpad"	盜跖; Dào zhí
Misc. chapters	30	"Discoursing on Swords"	說劍; Shuō jiàn
Misc. chapters	31	"An Old Fisherman"	漁父; Yú fù
Misc. chapters	32	"Lie Yukou"	列禦寇; Liè Yùkòu
Misc. chapters	33	"All Under Heaven"	天下; Tiānxià

== See also ==
- Glossary of Chinese philosophy
- Glossar zur chinesischen Textkritik (in German)
- Glossar zur historischen Phonologie des Chinesischen (in German)

== Bibliography ==
(selected items)

Overviews and collections

- Fang Yong 方勇: 《子藏·庄子卷》：庄学文献集大成者 [Zǐcáng · Zhuāngzǐ juàn: Zhuāngxué wénxiàn jí dàchéng zhě — Comprehensive compilation of Zhuang studies literature]. 2011 子藏‧道家部‧莊子卷（全162冊） 編著者：方勇總編纂出版社：國家圖書館出版社出版時間：2011年12月 *
- Yan Lingfeng 嚴靈峰 [Ling-Feng Yan]; editor of Wuqiubeizhai Zhuangzi jicheng chubian (無求備齋莊子集成初編, Compilation Commentaries on the Zhuangzi: the First Edition). Taipei: Yiwen Yinshuguan, 1972, and Wuqiubeizhai Zhuangzi jicheng xubian (無求備齋莊子集成續編, Compilation Commentaries on the Zhuangzi: the Sequel Edition). Taipei: Yiwen Yinshuguan, 1973 *

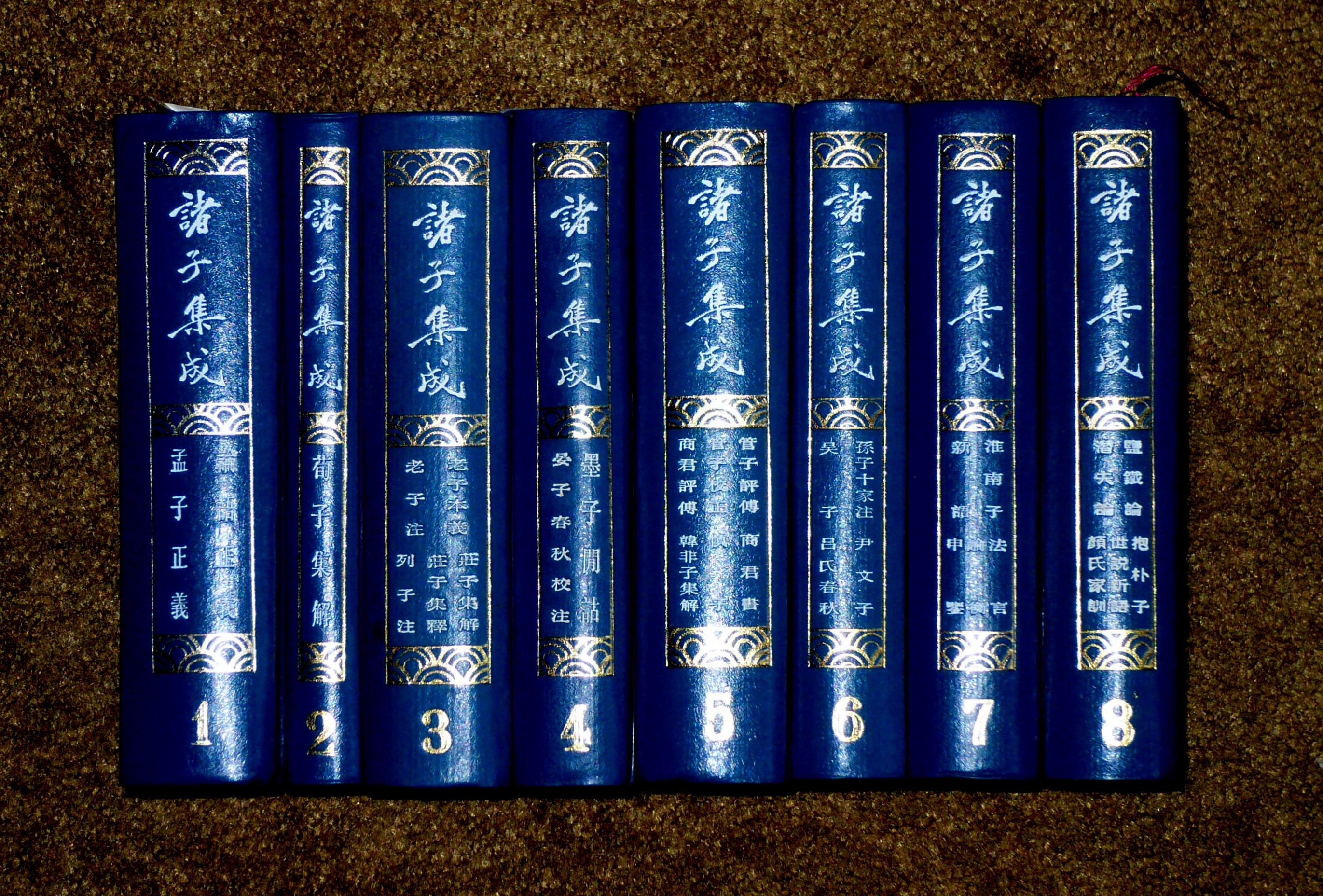
Zhuzi jicheng (eight-volume edition), volume 3: Zhuangzi jijie 莊子集解 / 庄子集解, 8 juan, by (Qing) Wang Xianqian 王先謙 / 王先谦 and Zhuangzi jishi 莊子集釋 / 庄子集释, 10 juan, by (Qing) Guo Qingfan 郭慶藩 / 郭庆藩

- Zhuangzi jicheng 庄子集成 (福建人民出版社出版《庄子集成》第一辑)
- Zhuzi jicheng 諸子集成 / 诸子集成, vol. 3

[...]

- Zhang Yuanshan 张远山: Zhuangzi fuyuan ben 庄子复原本 (2 vols.), Beijing 2021 (abb. ZZFYB)

English editions and literature

- Wandering on the Way: Early Taoist Tales and Parables of Chuang Tzu. Translated by Mair, Victor H. Honolulu: University of Hawaiʻi Press. 1998.
- Harold D. Roth: "Chuang tzu", in: Loewe, Michael (1993). Early Chinese Texts: A Bibliographical Guide. Berkeley: The Society for the Study of Early China and the Institute of East Asian Studies. OCLC 1348979043.
- Livia Kohn: Zhuangzi Text and Context. 2014. ISBN 978-1-931483-27-8 (in partial view - a comprehensive discussion of the ancient Daoist work Zhuangzi in 24 chapters)
- The Taoist Canon – A Historical Companion to the Daozang, ed. Kristofer Schipper and Franciscus Verellen, The University of Chicago Press 2005, ISBN 978-0-226-73817-8 (3 vols.)
- Brook Ziporyn: Zhuangzi: The Essential Writings with Selections from Traditional Commentaries. 2009. ISBN 9780872209114 (including selections from 2000 years of traditional Chinese commentaries)*
- David Chai: Early Zhuangzi Commentaries: On the Sounds and Meanings of the Inner Chapters. VDM Verlag Dr. Müller, Saarbrücken 2008.
- Chung-Yu Chen: The Perspective of Chongxuan in Zhuangzi Scholarship during Song Dynasty: A Clue on Chen Jing Yuan. Advisor: Yung-Sheng Lin, Ph.D., 2023 (參考文獻 - References)
- Arthur Waley: Three Ways of Thought in Ancient China. London 1939 (drawing on extracts from Zhuangzi, Mencius, Han Feizi & Shangzi)
- Herbert Giles (1889), Chuang Tzŭ: Mystic, Moralist and Social Reformer, London: Bernard Quaritch; 2nd edition, revised (1926), Shanghai: Kelly and Walsh; reprinted (1961), London: George Allen and Unwin.
- James Legge: The Writings of Kwang-tze // The Sacred Books of the East. Vols. 39–40. Oxford, 1891. (Vol. 39, pp. 164–392; Vol. 40, pp. 1–232) (Online)
- Chuang, Chou [Zhuangzi]. The sayings of Chuang Chou. A new translation by James R. Ware. New York, N.Y. : The New American Library, 1963.
- Burton Watson: Chuang tzu: Basic writings; New York and London: Columbia University Press, 1964
- Burton Watson: The complete works of Chuang Tzu; New York and London: Columbia University Press, 1968 (partial view of a modernized edition)
- A. C. Graham: Chuang-tzu, The Seven Inner Chapters and other writings from the book Chuang-tzu; London: George Allen and Unwin, 1981; also published paperback, 1986. (Notes to this translation were published separately as Chuang-tzu: textual notes to a partial translation; London: School of Oriental and African Studies, 1982).
- Fung Yu-lan: A History of Chinese Philosophy. Band 1. Princeton, 1952; Chuang Tzu, a new selected translation with an exposition of the philosophy of Kuo Hsiang; Shanghai: Shangwu, 1933 (includes translation of pian nos. 1–7).

Russian edition and literature

- V. V. Maliavin: Чжуан-цзы (Zhuangzi). Moscow, 1985 (Russian)
- L. D. Posdnejeva (translation, commentaries, introduction): Атеисты, материалисты, диалектики древнего Китая (Atheists, Materialists, Dialecticians of Ancient China). Moscow, 1969 [with translations of the ancient Chinese classics Liezi and Zhuangzi] (Russian)
- Древнекитайская философия (Ancient Chinese Philosophy). Vol. 1, Moscow, 1972, pp. 248–294. (Russian)
