= Guo Qingfan =

Qing dynasty scholar

Guo Qingfan (simplified Chinese: 郭庆藩; traditional Chinese: 郭慶藩; pinyin: Guō Qìngfān; Wade–Giles: Kuo Ch'ing-fan; 1844–1896, from Xiangyin County) was an important scholar of the late Qing period. Today he is mostly known as the editor of the Zhuangzi jishi 庄子集释 / 莊子集釋 (Collected Explanations of the Zhuangzi).

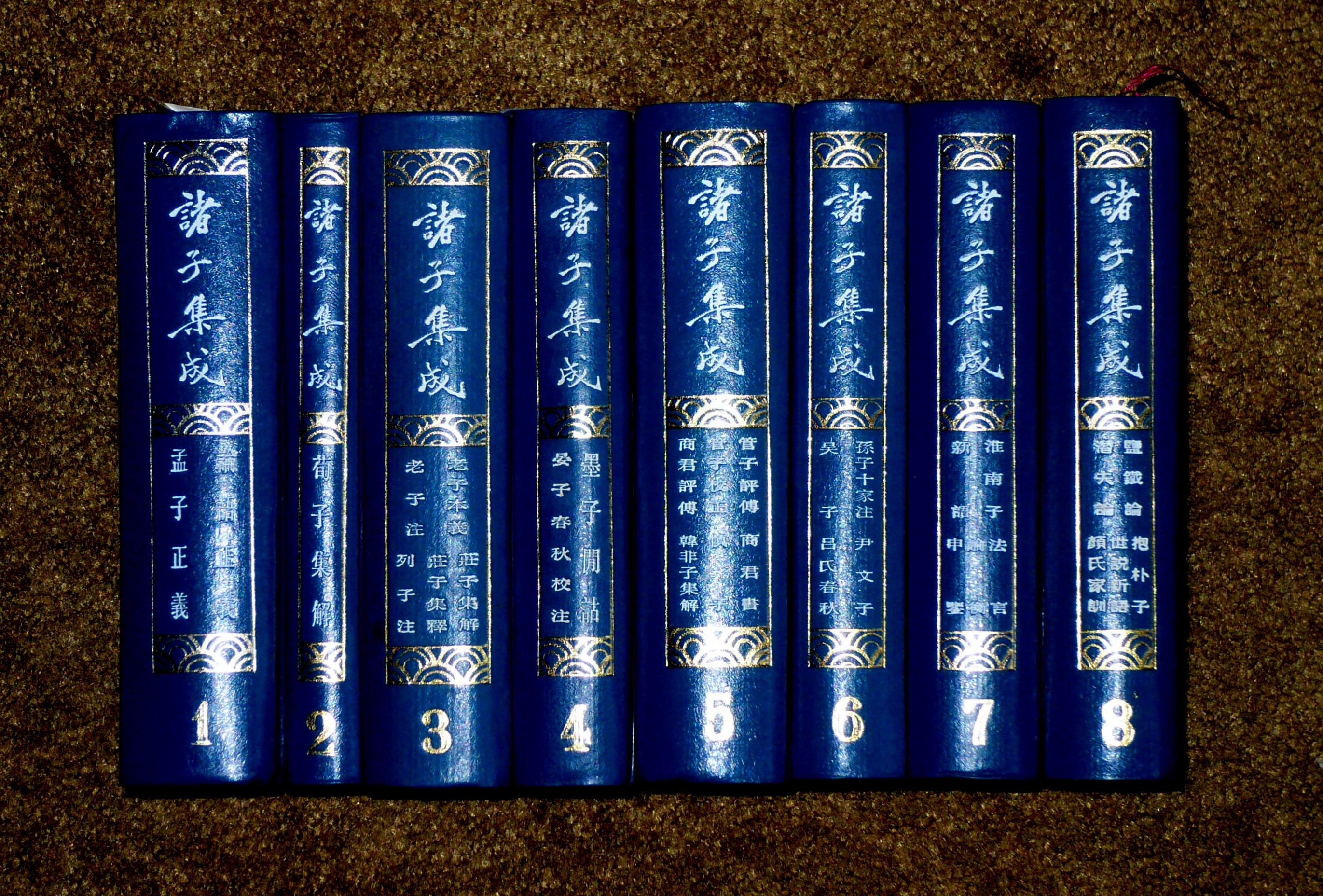
Zhuzi jicheng (eight-volume edition), volume 3: Zhuangzi jijie (8 juan) by (Qing) Wang Xianqian, and Zhuangzi jishi (10 juan) by (Qing) Guo Qingfan

Guo Qingfan (zi: Mengchun 孟純, hao: Zijing 子瀞) was a son of Guo Kundao. He, wrote or compiled some ten works, among which were these comprehensive annotations to Zhuangzi, printed in 1894.

Zhuangzi jishi

== Zhuangzi jishi ==
The modern Chinese philosopher Chen Guying 陈鼓应 (b. 1935) highlights the merits of Guo Qingfan's Zhuangzi jishi in the preface to his modern Chinese translation of the book Zhuangzi. According to his information, Guo Qingfan's edition Zhuangzi jishi includes the full texts of Guo Xiang’s Commentary (zhu), Cheng Xuanying’s Sub-commentary (shu), and Lu Deming’s Pronunciations and Meanings (yinyi). It also excerpts textual studies by Qing dynasty scholars such as Wang Niansun and Yu Yue, and adds the opinions of Guo Songtao as well as his own. The original Zhuangzi jishi was based on the Song dynasty edition reproduced in Li Shuchang's 黎庶昌 Guyi congshu. Wang Xiaoyu's 王孝鱼 (1900–1981) revised edition was further corrected using the Song edition facsimile in Xu Guyi congshu, the Ming Shidetang 世德堂 edition, the Daozang version of Cheng Xuanying’s Sub-commentary, and the Sibu congkan 四部丛刊 appendix containing Sun Yuxiu's 孙毓修 Song Zhao Jianyi ben jiaoji 宋赵谏议本校记, as well as modern works such as Wang Shumin's 王叔岷 Zhuangzi jiaoshi (Collation and Notes) and Liu Wendian's 刘文典 Zhuangzi buzheng. The original text of the Zhuangzi used in Chen Guying’s modern commentary and translation of the Zhuangzi is based on the edition by Guo Qingfan (Zhuangzi jishi), which was corrected by Wang Xiaoyu.

Together with the Zhuangzi jijie 庄子集解 (8 juan) by the Qing scholar Wang Xianqian 王先谦, the Zhuangzi jishi is contained in the prestigious collection of ancient Chinese philosophers named Zhuzi jicheng.

== See also ==
- Glossary of Zhuangzi exegesis

== Bibliography ==
- Chen Guying 陈鼓应: Zhuangzi jinzhu jinyi 庄子今注今译. Beijing 2007 (2 vols.) - Online
- Eminent Chinese of the Ch'ing Period (1644-1912). U.S. Government Printing Office 1943, 1944, 2 vols. digital copy: I, II (abb. ECCP)
