= Zhuangzi jijie =

Zhuangzi commentary

Zhuangzi jijie (simplified Chinese: 庄子集解; traditional Chinese: 莊子集解; pinyin: Zhuāngzǐ jíjiě; Wade–Giles: Chuang-tzu chi-chieh; “Collected Commentaries on the Zhuangzi” or “Collected Explanations of the Zhuangzi”) is a commentary on the Zhuangzi composed by Wang Xianqian 王先谦 (1842–1918) during the late Qing dynasty. The work comprises eight juan (scrolls).

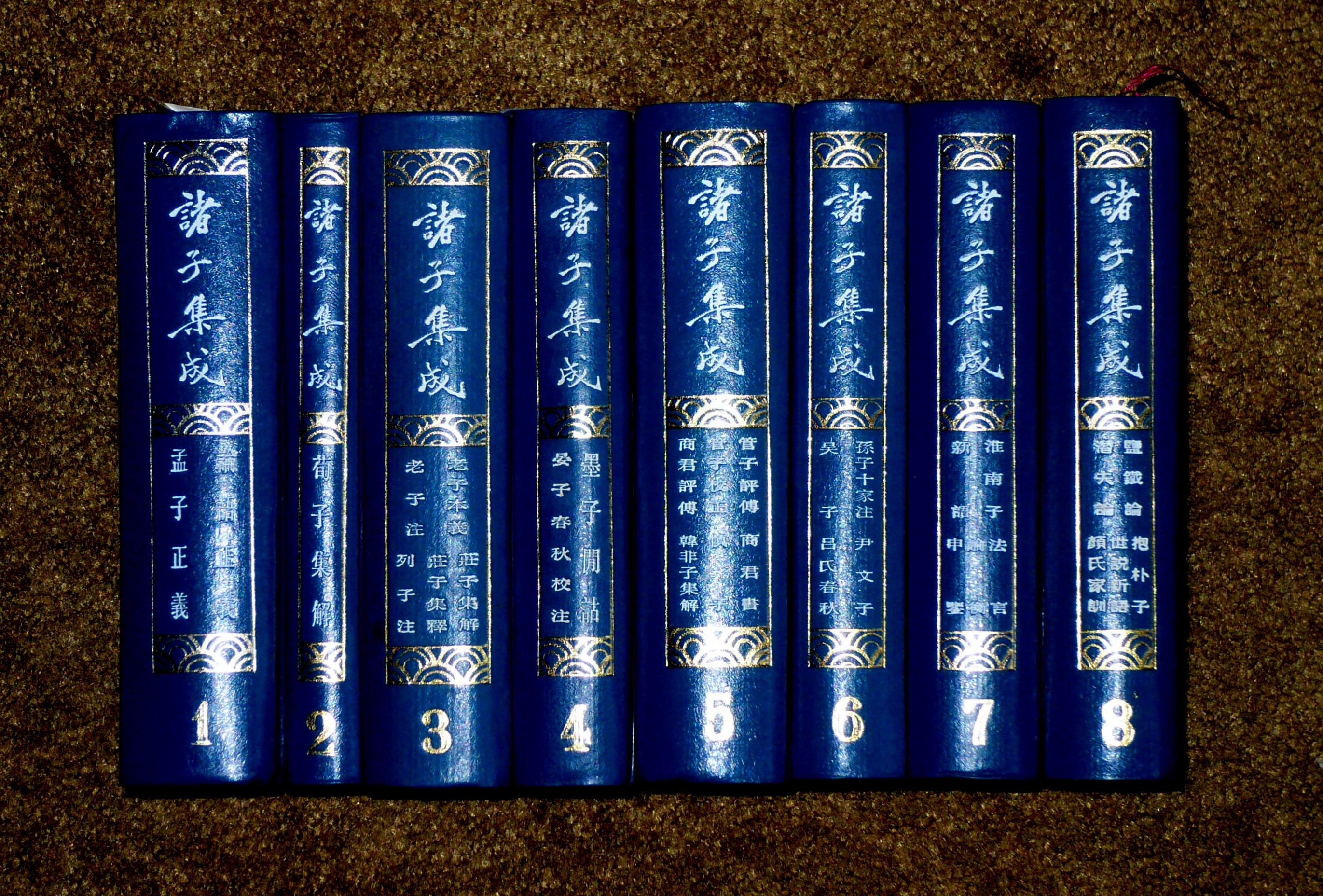
Zhuzi jicheng 诸子集成 (eight-volume edition), volume 3: Zhuangzi jijie (8 juan) by (Qing) Wang Xianqian, and Zhuangzi jishi (10 juan) by (Qing) Guo Qingfan

== Content ==
Wang studied earlier commentaries on the Zhuangzi intensively, compared differing interpretations, assessed their strengths and weaknesses, and selected what he regarded as the most convincing explanations. He emphasized clarity and conciseness, avoiding unnecessary length and complexity. The work integrates semantic and philosophical explanations directly into the text. Wang Xianqian took into account, among other sources, the pronunciation and semantic variants recorded by Lu Deming, and drew upon commentaries by Sima Biao, Yu Yue, and Guo Qingfan. According to the Siku da cidian, later scholars particularly valued the Zhuangzi jijie because it synthesizes the results of earlier research and brings together the principal readings of different scholarly traditions. Especially with regard to pronunciation and meaning, it incorporated numerous variant readings from Lu Deming (see also his Zhuangzi yinyi).

The work is regarded as one of the most comprehensive annotated editions of the Zhuangzi and is frequently used together with Guo Qingfan’s Zhuangzi jieshi. These two works were, for example, both included in the philosophical series Zhuzi jicheng 诸子集成 as well as in the more recent series Xinbian Zhuzi jicheng 新编诸子集成.

With regard to the passage from chapter 17 (Autumn Floods) of the Zhuangzi, often rendered or translated as “the frog in the well,” Wang Xianqian cites a comment by Wang Yinzhi, according to which the relevant character (based on readings in various textual witnesses such as the Yulan, etc.) was originally to be read as “fish” (yu).

Editions are currently available from the Hunan Sixian Shuju 湖南思贤书局. During the Republic of China period, an edition was printed in the Guoxue jiben congshu 国学基本丛书 by the Commercial Press in Shanghai; a reprint was issued in 1954 by the Zhonghua Shuju.

In the philosophical series Zhuzi jicheng 诸子集成, a photographic reproduction was published, which was consulted, for example, in the 1980 Zhonghua Shuju edition of the Hanyu da zidian.

== See also ==
- Glossary of Zhuangzi exegesis

== Bibliography ==
- Wang Xianqian 王先谦: Zhuangzi jijie 庄子集解. Zhuzi jicheng 诸子集成, photographic reproduction of Zhonghua shuju 中华书局 1980
- Hu Huaichen 胡怀琛: Zhuangzi jijie buzheng 庄子集解补正. Puxuezhai congshu 朴学斋丛书 (vol. 1)
- Li Xueqin, Lü Wenyu (eds.): Siku da cidian 四庫大辭典 (2 vols.) Changchun: Jilin daxue chubanshe 1996 (p. 2301a)
