= Baizi quanshu =

Qing dynasty collection of Chinese philosophical works

Baizi quanshu (simplified Chinese: 百子全书; traditional Chinese: 百子全書; pinyin: Bǎizi quánshū) or Zishu baijia (simplified Chinese: 子书百家; traditional Chinese: 子書百家; pinyin: Zǐshū bǎijiā), a collection of the philosophical works of the so-called Hundred Schools of Thought, is a congshu compilation published by the Chongwen shuju (Chinese: 崇文书局; "Chongwen Bookstore") in Hubei during the Qing dynasty.

== Overview ==
The collection arranges roughly one hundred philosophical works from the Pre-Qin period up to the Ming dynasty according to the schools of thought (in categories, Chinese lei 類), with about two dozen works belonging to the Confucian school (section Rujia 儒家). It was first published in 1875, the 1st year of the Guangxu era, by the Chongwen Bookstore in Wuhan, Hubei, under the title Zishu baijia (子书百家). In 1919, the 8th year of the Republic of China, it was renamed Baizi quanshu (百子全书) in a lithographic edition printed by the Shanghai Saoye Shanfang (上海扫叶山房). A photographic reproduction of eight volumes (juan Chinese: 卷) was later published in 1984 by the Zhejiang renmin chubanshe (浙江人民出版社; "Zhejiang People's Publishing House").

The collection provides convenient access to works classified under the "Masters and Philosophers" category (zibu 子部), the third of the four traditional categories (sibu 四部) into which Chinese literature was historically organized.

== Contents ==
The collection is structured as follows (Pinyin / Chinese characters / extent in juan Chinese: 卷, dynasty, title, etc.):

Rujia 儒家類

- Kongzi jiayu 孔子家語, 10 juan (Wei) Wang Su 王肅 (comm.)
- Kongzi jiyu 孔子集語, 2 juan (Song) Xue Ju 薛據 (comp.)
- Xunzi 荀子, 3 juan (Zhou) Xun Kuang 荀況
- Kongcongzi 孔叢子, 2 juan (Han) Kong Fu 孔鮒
- Xinyu 新語, 2 juan (Han) Lu Jia 陸賈
- Zhongjing 忠經, 1 juan (Han) Ma Rong 馬融; Zheng Xuan 鄭玄 (comm.)
- Xinshu 新書, 10 juan (Han) Jia Yi 賈誼
- Yantielun 鹽鐵論, 2 juan (Han) Huan Kuan 桓寬
- Xinxu 新序, 10 juan (Han) Liu Xiang 劉向
- Shuoyuan 說苑, 20 juan (Han) Liu Xiang 劉向
- Yangzi fayan (Fayan) 揚子法言 (法言), 1 juan (Han) Yang Xiong 揚雄
- Fangyan 方言, 13 juan (Han) Yang Xiong 揚雄; (Jin) Guo Pu 郭璞 (comm.)
- Qianfulun 潛夫論, 10 juan (Han) Wang Fu 王符撰
- Shenjian 申鑒, 5 juan (Han) Xun Yue 荀悅
- Zhonglun 中論, 2 juan (Han) Xu Gan 徐幹
- Fuzi 傅子, 1 juan (Jin) Fu Xuan 傅玄
- Wen Zhongzi Zhongshuo (Zhongshuo) 文中子中說 (中說), 1 juan (Sui) Wang Tong 王通
- Xu Mengzi 續孟子, 2 juan (Tang) Lin Shensi 林慎思
- Shenmengzi 伸蒙子, 3 juan (Tang) Lin Shensi 林慎思
- Sulüzi 素履子, 3 juan (Tang) Zhang Hu 張弧
- Huzi zhiyan 胡子知言, 6 juan (Song) Hu Hong 胡宏撰
  - Fulu 附錄, 1 juan
  - Yiyi 疑義, 1 juan
- Xuezi daolun 薛子道論, 3 juan (Ming) Xue Xuan 薛瑄
- Haiqiaozi 海樵子, 1 juan (Ming) Wang Chongqing 王崇慶

Bingjia 兵家類

- Feng Hou Wojijing (Wojijing) 風后握奇經 (握奇經), 1 juan (Han) Gongsun Hong 公孫宏 (comm.); (Jin) Ma Long 馬隆 (comm.)
  - App. Wojijing xugu (附)握奇經續圖, 1 juan, Bazhen zongshu 八陣總述, 1 juan
- Liutao 六韜, 3 juan (Zhou) Lü Wang 呂望
- Sunzi (Sunzi bingfa) 孫子 (孫子兵法), 3 juan (Zhou) Sun Wu 孫武
- Wuzi 吳子, 2 juan (Zhou) Wu Qi 吳起
- Simafa 司馬法, 1 juan (Zhou) Sima Rangju 司馬穰苴
- Weiliaozi 尉繚子, 2 juan (Zhou) Wei Liao 尉繚
- Sushu (Huangshi Gong sushu) 素書 (黃石公素書), 1 juan (Han) Huangshi Gong or Huang Shigong 黃石公; (Song) Zhang Shangyin 張商英 (comm.)
- Xinshu 心書, 1 juan (Han) Zhuge Liang 諸葛亮
- He boshi beilun 何博士備論, 2 juan (Song) He Qufei 何去非
- Song chengxiang Li Zhongdinggong fuzheng benmo 宋丞相李忠定公輔政本末, 1 juan (Song) Li Gang 李綱

Fajia 法家類

- Guanzi 管子, 24 juan (Zhou) Guan Zhong 管仲
- Yanzi chunqiu 晏子春秋, 8 juan (Zhou) Yan Ying 晏嬰
- Shangzi (Shangjunshu) 商子 (商君書), 5 juan (Zhou) Shang Yang 商鞅
- Dengzi (Dengxizi) 鄧子 (鄧析子), 1 juan (Zhou) Deng Xi 鄧析
- Shizi 尸子, 2 juan (Zhou) Shi Jiao 尸佼
- Hanfeizi 韓非子, 20 juan (Zhou) Han Fei 韓非

Nongjia 農家類

- Qimin yaoshu 齊民要術, 10 juan (Later Wei) Jia Sixie 賈思勰
- Zashuo 雜說, 1 juan (Later Wei) Jia Sixie 賈思勰

Shushu 術數類

- Taixuanjing 太玄經, 10 juan (Han) Yang Xiong 揚雄
- Jiaoshi yilin 焦氏易林, 4 juan (Han) Jiao Gan 焦贛

Zajia 雜家類

- Yuzi 鬻子, 1 juan, Suppl. (補) 1 juan (Zhou) Yu Xiong 鬻熊; (Tang) Feng Xinggui 逢行珪 (comm.); (Ming) Yang Zhisen 楊之森 (comp.)
- Jinizi (Jiranzi) 計倪子 (計然子), 1 juan (Zhou) Ji Ran 計然
- Yulingzi 於陵子, 1 juan (Zhou) Tian Zhong 田仲
- Zihuazi 子華子, 2 juan (Zhou) Chen Ben 程本
- Mozi 墨子, 16 juan (Zhou) Mo Di 墨翟
  - App. Pianmukao (附)篇目考, 1 juan
- Yinwenzi 尹文子, 1 juan (Zhou) Yin Wen 尹文
- Shenzi 慎子, 1 juan (Zhou) Shen Dao 慎到
- Gongsun Longzi 公孫龍子, 1 juan (Zhou) Gongsun Long 公孫龍
- Guiguzi 鬼谷子, 1 juan (Zhou) NN
- Heguanzi 鶡冠子 (鶴冠子), 3 juan (Song) Lu Dian 陸佃 (comm.)
- Lüshi chunqiu 呂氏春秋, 26 juan (Qin) Lü Buwei 呂不韋
- Huainan honglie jie (Huainanzi) 淮南鴻烈解 (淮南子), 21 juan (Han) Liu An 劉安; Gao You 高誘 (comm.)
- Jinlouzi 金樓子, 6 juan (Liang) Xiao Yi 蕭繹 (梁元帝 Emperor Liang Yuandi)
- Liuzi 劉子, 2 juan (Nördliche Qi) Liu Zhou 劉晝
- Yanshi jiaxun 顏氏家訓, 2 juan (Northern Qi) Yan Zhitui 顏之推
- Duduan 獨斷, 1 juan (Han) Cai Yong 蔡邕
- Lunheng 論衡, 30 juan (Han) Wang Chong 王充
- Baihutong delun 白虎通德論, 4 juan (Han) Ban Gu 班固
- Fengsu tongyi 風俗通義, 10 juan (Han) Ying Shao 應劭
- Mouzi (Lihuolun) 牟子 (理惑論), 1 juan (Han) Mou Rong 牟融
- Gujinzhu 古今注, 3 juan (Jin) Cui Bao 崔豹
- Aoyuzi xuxi suowei lun 聱隅子歔欷瑣微論, 2 juan (Song) Huang Xi 黃晞
- Lanzhenzi 懶真子, 5 juan (Song) Ma Yongqing 馬永卿
- Guangchengzi jie 廣成子解, 1 juan (Song) Su Shi 蘇軾
- Shujuzi Neipian Waipian 叔苴子 內篇, 6 juan 外篇, 2 juan (Ming) Zhuang Yuanchen 莊元臣
- Yulizi 郁離子, 1 juan (Ming) Liu Ji 劉基
- Kongdongzi 空洞子, 1 juan (Ming) Li Mengyang 李夢陽
- Haiyizi 海沂子, 5 juan (Ming) Wang Wenlu 王文祿

Xiaoshuo (Zashi) 小說家(雜事類)

- Yandanzi 燕丹子, 3 juan (Qing) Sun Xingyan 孫星衍 (comp.)
- Yuquanzi 玉泉子, 1 juan (Tang) NN
- Jinhuazi zabian (Jinhuazi) 金華子雜編 (金華子), 2 juan (Southern Tang) Liu Chongyuan 劉崇遠

Xiaoshuo (Yiwen) 小說家(異聞類)

- Shanhaijing 山海經, 18 juan (Jin) Guo Pu 郭璞
- Shanhaijing tuzan 山海經圖贊, 1 juan (Jin) Guo Pu 郭璞
- Shanhaijing buzhu 山海經補注, 1 juan (Ming) Yang Shen 楊慎
- Shenyijing 神異經, 1 juan (Han) Dongfang Shuo 東方朔; (Jin) Zhang Hua 張華 (comm.)
- Hainei shizhou ji 海內十洲記, 1 juan (Han) Dongfang Shuo 東方朔
- Bieguo dongming ji (Dongmingji) 別國洞冥記 (洞冥記), 4 juan (Han) Guo Xian 郭憲
- Mu Tianzi zhuan 穆天子傳, 6 juan (Jin) Guo Pu 郭璞 (comm.)
- Shiyiji 拾遺記, 10 juan (Former Qin) Wang Jia 王嘉; (Liang) Xiao Qi 蕭綺 (comp.)
- Soushenji 搜神記, 20 juan (Jin) Gan Bao 干寶
- Soushen houji 搜神後記, 10 juan (Jin) Tao Qian 陶潛
- Bowuzhi 博物志, 10 juan (Jin) Zhang Hua 張華; (Song) Zhou Riyong 周日用 et al. (comm.)
- Xu bowuzhi 續博物志, 10 juan (Song) Li Shi 李石
- Shuyiji 述異記, 2 juan (Liang) Ren Fang 任昉

Daojia 道家類

- Yinfujing 陰符經, 1 juan (Han) Zhang Liang 張良 (comm.)
- Guanyinzi 關尹子, 1 juan (Zhou) Yin Xi 尹喜
- Laozi daode jing (Daodejing) 老子道德經 (道德經), 2 juan (Zhou) Li Er 李耳; (Wei) Wang Bi 王弼 (comm.)
- Daode zhenjing zhu 道德真經注, 4 juan (Yuan) Wu Cheng 吳澄
- Zhuangzi nanhua zhenjing (Zhuangzi) 莊子南華真經 (莊子), 3 juan, (Zhou) Zhuang Zhou 莊周
  - Zhaji 札記, 1 juan
- Zhuangzi quewu 莊子闕誤, 1 juan (Ming) Yang Shen 楊慎
- Liezi 列子, 2 juan (Zhou) Lie Yukou 列御寇
- Baopuzi Neipian Waipian 抱朴子 內篇, 4 juan 外篇, 4 juan (Jin) Ge Hong 葛洪
- Kangcangzi 亢倉子, 1 juan (Zhou) Geng Sang 庚桑
- Xuanzhenzi 玄真子, 1 juan (Tang) Zhang Zhihe 張志和
- Tianyinzi 天隱子, 1 juan (Tang) Sima Chengzhen 司馬承禎
- Wunengzi 無能子, 3 juan (Tang) NN
- Taixijing shu 胎息經疏, 1 juan (Ming) Wang Wenlu 王文祿
- Taixijing 胎息經, 1 juan (Ming) Huanzhen xiansheng 幻真先生 (comm.)
- Zhiyouzi 至游子, 2 juan (Ming) NN

== See also ==
- Zhuzi jicheng
- Glossary of Chinese philosophy

== Bibliography ==
- Li Xueqin 李学勤, and Lü Wenyu 吕文郁 (eds.): Siku da cidian 四庫大辭典/四库大辞典. Changchun: Jilin daxue chubanshe 1996, vol. 2, 1996, p. 2066.
- Shanghai tushuguan 上海圖書館 (ed.): Zhongguo congshu zonglu 中國叢書綜錄. Shanghai guji chubanshe, Shanghai, vol. 1, 1982, pp. 695–696.
- Zhuzi baijia da cidian 諸子百家大辞典. Liaoning renmin chubanshe 辽宁人民出版社 1996
