= Dushu zazhi =

The Dushu zazhi (simplified Chinese: 读书杂志; traditional Chinese: 讀書雜志; Wade–Giles: Tu-shu tsa-chih; „Miscellaneous Notes on the Classics“) is a philological work by Wang Niansun (1744–1832) in 82 juan (fascicles), printed in series between 1812 and 1831. In 1832 a two juan supplement entitled Zhiyu 志餘 was published.

== Content ==
The work arose from the conviction of its author that, in order to grasp the meaning of the Classics, one must first acquire a knowledge of etymology. According to Li Man-kuei (in ECCP) this methodological principle forms the foundation of the Dushu zazhi. The work consists of annotations and emendations of difficult passages in ancient Chinese texts. Among the works discussed are Shiji (史記), Hanshu (漢書), Guanzi (管子), Mozi (墨子), Xunzi (荀子). Its primary focus is the explanation of problematic passages and the correction of textual errors. In all his exegetical work, the author was careful to indicate his sources and to generalize only on the basis of wide study. The Dushu zazhi is one of the major works resulting from the author's studies in etymology. An other is the Guangya shuzheng (廣雅疏證), an other his book on the Fangyan.

The authors works reflect a philological approach that grounds the interpretation of the classical texts in systematic etymological research.

The Hanyu da zidian f.e. uses the edition of the publisher Jiangsu Ancient Books Publishing House (1985) with a facsimile reprint of the Wang family block-printed edition.

== See also ==
- Sun Yirang: Zhayi 札迻
- Yu Yue: Zhuzi pingyi 諸子平議

== Bibliography ==
- Wang Niansun: Dushu zazhi 读书杂志. Jiangsu guji chubanshe, 1985
- Li Xueqin, Lü Wenyu (eds.): Siku da cidian 四庫大辭典. 2 vols. Changchun: Jilin daxue chubanshe 1996 (vol. 1, 675-6: Dushu zazhi)
- Hummel, Arthur W. Sr., ed. (1943). "Wang Nien-sun" . Eminent Chinese of the Ch'ing Period. United States Government Printing Office.
