= Zhayi =

Qing textual-critical studies

Zhayi (Chinese: 札迻; Wade–Giles: Cha-i; translated with "Notes" or "Transmitted collation notes", etc.) is a collection of textual-critical, commentary, and philological studies written by the prominent late Qing dynasty scholar Sun Yirang (1848–1908), who is especially known for his research on the book Mozi 墨子.

== Content ==
In his book Zhayi 札迻, Sun Yirang presented the results of textual-critical research on more than 70 ancient books from various literary genres. The work also provides valuable insight into the scholarly tradition of the Qing dynasty, its research methods, and ways to improve skills in studying and correcting ancient texts.

Zhayi contains the collected results of his over thirty years of study of ancient texts. Sun Yirang himself described its guiding principle as follows:

凡所考论，虽复简丝数米，或涉琐屑，于作述闳恉，未窥百一，然匡违芮佚，必有谊据，无以孤证肊说，贸乱古书之直

(roughly translated) Everything that is examined, even if it concerns only the smallest detail, may seem insignificant, but it is treated with comprehensive care. Even if only a fraction of the texts is covered, every correction is based on factual evidence; no isolated evidence is used arbitrarily to distort ancient texts.

The Qing scholar Yu Yue (1821–1907) says in the preface he wrote for the book:

至其精孰訓詁，通達叚𦔡，援據古籍以補正訛奪，根抵經義以詮釋古言，𣫭下一說輒使前後文皆怡然理順

(roughly translated) As for his mastery of philological exegesis, he is meticulous and thoroughly versed in variant and extended usages of characters; drawing on ancient sources, he corrects textual corruptions and omissions, grounding his explanations in the principles of the classics to elucidate archaic expressions. With each individual interpretation, he naturally brings the preceding and following passages into coherent and effortless order.

Individual studies within the Zhayi, such as those on the book Zhuangzi, are often referred to under titles like Zhuangzi zhayi (莊子札迻).

The Hanyu da zidian (HYDZD), for example, cites the Zhayi in the woodblock edition of the year Guangxu 22 (1896).

== See also ==
- Wang Niansun: Dushu zazhi 讀書雜志
- Yu Yue: Zhuzi pingyi 諸子平議

== Bibliography ==
- Sun Yirang 孙诒让: Zhayi 札迻. Guangxu 22nd year [1896] woodblock edition 光绪二十二年刻本
- Yunqiang Li: "A Study of Inference Meanings from Sounds in the Zha Yi". Modern Linguistics 现代语言学, 2025, 13(8), 973-978 (in Chinese)
- Yang Duanzhi 杨端志: "Sun Yirang 孙诒让: Zhayi 札迻", in: Zhongguo yuyanxue yaoji jieti 中国语言学要籍解题. Qilu shushe 齐鲁书社, Jinan 1991, ISBN 7533302109
