= Shidetang liuzi =

Shidetang liuzi (Chinese: 世德堂六子; pinyin: Shìdétáng liùzǐ; Wade–Giles: Shih-te-t'ang liu-tzu; "Six Masters of the Shidetang") is a collection of classical Chinese philosophical works published during the Ming dynasty. The edition was printed in 1533 (the 12th year of the Jiajing era) by Gu Chun (顾春) under the imprint of his study hall Shidetang (世德堂, “Hall of Traditional Morals”). The work is also known under the title Liuzi quanshu (Chinese: 六子全书; pinyin: Liùzǐ quánshū, “Complete Works of the Six Masters”).

Shidetang edition of the Zhuangzi (Nanhua zhenjing)

== Editor ==
Gu Chun (顾春; courtesy name Yuanqing 元卿) was from Wujun (吴郡; today Suzhou, Jiangsu Province). His study hall was named “Shidetang” (世德堂 Shìdétáng), which also served as the publishing imprint for the edition.

== Contents ==
The collection belongs to the tradition of the so-called Zhuzi compilations (诸子丛书), collections of classical philosophical texts from various schools of thought. It includes the following works with traditional commentaries:

Laozi (老子), commentary by Heshang Gong (河上公),
Zhuangzi (庄子), commentary by Guo Xiang (郭象),
Liezi (列子), commentary by Zhang Zhan (张湛),
Xunzi (荀子), commentary by Yang Liang (杨倞),
Yangzi Fayan (扬子法言), commentary by five scholars, including Li Gui (李轨),
Zhongshuo (中说), commentary by Ruan Yi (阮逸).

== 1533 Edition ==
The surviving edition from the 12th year of the Jiajing era (1533) is considered particularly carefully edited. Each work is preceded by a preface. According to tradition, the text was collated with reference to numerous comparative works and checked multiple times. The woodblock printing is of high technical quality and was already appreciated by contemporaries. Several later reprints appeared. At the end of the volume, there is a postscript (ba 跋) written by Gu Chun in 1533.

== Significance ==
The Shidetang liuzi edition represents an important example of the editorial work of private scholars in the Ming period. It reflects both the continuing interest in classical philosophical texts and the high quality of commercial book printing in the 16th century. For example, the Hanyu da zidian uses the Sibu congkan 四部丛刊 edition with a photographic reproduction of the Shidetang edition (世德堂本) for the Zhuangzi text.

The Zhuangzi of the Shidetang edition was, according to Harold David Roth the basis for 37 subsequent editions, including the Sibu congkan and Sibu beiyao.

== See also ==
- Zhuzi jicheng
- Baizi quanshu
