= Jingyi shuwen =

Chinese classic text

Jingyi shuwen (simplified Chinese: 经义述闻; traditional Chinese: 經義述聞; pinyin: Jīngyì shùwén; Wade–Giles: Ching-i shu-wên; roughly translated Transmitted Accounts of the Interpretations of the Classics) is a book on the meanings of special passages in classical Chinese texts. It was written by the Chinese philologist Wang Yinzhi 王引之 (1744–1832), the son of the scholar Wang Niansun 王念孫 (1744–1832), during the Qing dynasty.

The work comprises 32 volumes (juan). It covers texts such as the Zhouyi (Book of Changes), Shangshu (Book of Documents), Maoshi (Mao Commentary to the Book of Odes), Zhouli (Rites of Zhou), Yili (Etiquette and Ceremonial), Da Dai Liji (Ritual Records of Dai the Elder), Liji (Book of Rites), Zuozhuan (Zuo Commentary), Guoyu (Discourses of the States), Gongyang zhuan (Gongyang Commentary), Guliang zhuan (Guliang Commentary), and Erya (Approaching Elegance).

The work combines a classical form of linguistics (xiaoxue), textual criticism (jiaokan), and studies of the Confucian classics (jingxue). In its own preface, it states:

「諸說並列，則求其是；字有假借，則改其讀。」(“When different explanations stand side by side, the correct one is sought; when characters are used as loangraphs (假借 jiǎjiè), their reading (读 dú) is corrected.”)

The work also includes a preface by Ruan Yuan 阮元 (1764–1849). The first edition appeared in the second year of the Jiaqing era (1797) in incomplete form; in 1827, the seventh year of the Daoguang era, it was fully reprinted.

Wang Yinzhi carefully examined sentence readings, erroneous characters, superfluous passages, and missing sections. Most explanations and interpretations are based on the teachings of his father, Wang Niansun, which is reflected in the work's title. The book resolved many longstanding questions in classical studies dating back to the Han dynasty and serves as a reference for research in Chinese characters, exegesis, and phonetics.

For example, the text categorizes ancient rhymes (gǔyùn 古韵) into 21 rhyme groups (yùnbù 韵部). The Hanyu da zidian (HYDZD), for instance, uses the block-printed edition produced by the Wang family, which was reproduced in 1985 by the Jiangsu Chinese Classics Publishing House.

== See also ==
- Glossary of Chinese Textual Criticism (in German)

== Bibliography ==
- Wang Yinzhi 王引之: Jingyi shuwen 经义述闻. Wangshi jia keben, Jiangsu guji chubanshe 1985 nian yingyin 王氏家刻本, 江苏古籍出版社1985年影印
- Cheung, Kam-siu: New Evidence for the Authorship of Jingyi Shuwen and Jingzhuan Shici. Qinghua xuebao 41.2. 2011
- Zhongguo zhexue da cidian 中国哲学大辞典. Zhang Dainian 张岱年 (ed.). Shanghai cishu chubanshe 上海辞书出版社, Shanghai 2010
- Hummel, Arthur W. Sr., ed. (1943). "Wang Yin-chih" . Eminent Chinese of the Ch'ing Period. United States Government Printing Office.

== Weblinks ==
- 王引之《經義述聞》斠正 (An Emendation to Wang Yinzhi's Jingyi Shuwen) - Kwok, Pang Fei
- Jingyi shuwen (Quan si ce) 经义述闻（全四册）
