= Lunheng =

Classical Chinese text by Wang Chong (80 AD)

- Traditional Chinese: 《論衡》
- Simplified Chinese: 《论衡》
- Literal meaning: Discourses in the Balance
Transcriptions
Standard Mandarin
- Hanyu Pinyin: 《Lùnhéng》
- Wade–Giles: Lun-heng

The Lunheng, also known by numerous English translations, is a wide-ranging Chinese classic text by Wang Chong (27 – c. 100). First published in 80, it contains critical essays on natural science and Chinese mythology, philosophy, and literature.

== Name ==
A page from a Ming dynasty printed copy of Lunheng

The title Lunheng combines lun 論 or 论 "discuss; talk about; discourse; decide on; determine; mention; regard; consider" and heng 衡 "crosswise; balance beam; weigh; measure; judge; appreciate". English translations of the title include "Disquisitions" (Alfred Forke), "Critical Essays" (Feng Yu-lan), "The Balanced Inquiries" (Wing-tsit Chan), or "Discourses Weighed in the Balance" (Joseph Needham).

== Text ==
The received Lunheng comprises 85 pian 篇 "articles; sections; chapters" in 30 juan 巻 "scrolls; volumes; books", with more than 200,000 characters. Actually, 84 pian is more accurate because the text only contains the title of Chapter 44 Zhaozhi 招致.

Yang Wenchang (楊文昌) edited the first printed Lunheng edition, which was the basis for subsequent editions. Its 1045 preface notes that Yang compared 2 complete and 7 partial textual copies and corrected 11,259 characters.

"No commentaries to the Lun heng appear to have been written before the nineteenth century," write Pokora and Loewe, which is unusual among Chinese classics. The first Lunheng commentators were Yu Yue (1821–1907), Sun Yirang (1848–1908), and Yang Shoujing (1839–1915).

== History ==
Based on internal evidence, Forke concludes the Later Han dynasty Lunheng text "must date" from the years 76–84. Chapter 38 (齊世 "The Equality of the Ages") says, "Our present sage and enlightened sovereign is continuing the blessings and the prosperity of the reigns of" Emperor Guangwu (r. 25–57) and Emperor Ming (r. 58–75), which implies the period of Emperor Zhang (r. 75–88). Chapter 30 (講瑞 "Arguments on Ominous Creatures"), notes it was completed during the Jianchu 建初 era (76–84).

Feng notes the Lunheng "was probably completed" during the years 82 and 83. "The authenticity of the work has not been brought into question", write Pokora and Loewe, and the text "may possibly have been completed between 70 and 80", based upon collections of Wang's earlier writings or essays.

== Content ==
The contents of the Lunheng are summarized by Pokora and Loewe:

In discussing natural phenomena and their implications or causes, matters of popular belief and misconception and political issues, the book is often written in polemical form. A controversial statement is made, to be followed by the author's critical rebuttal, which is often supported by quotations from earlier writings. In many ways the Lun heng may be regarded as an encyclopaedic collection of the claims and beliefs of Chinese religion, thought and folklore.

Wang's Lunheng frequently espouses Daoist notions of naturalism. For example, Chapter 54 Ziran 自然 "Spontaneity" says:

By the fusion of the fluids [qi] of Heaven and Earth all things of the world are produced spontaneously, just as by the mixture of the fluids of husband and wife children are born spontaneously. Among the things thus produced, creatures with blood in their veins are sensitive of hunger and cold. Seeing that grain can be eaten, they use it as food, and discovering that silk and hemp can be worn, they take it as raiment. Some people are of opinion that Heaven produces grain for the purpose of feeding mankind, and silk and hemp to cloth them. That would be tantamount to making Heaven the farmer of man or his mulberry girl [who feeds the silkworms], it would not be in accordance with spontaneity, therefore this opinion is very questionable and unacceptable.

Reasoning on Taoist principles we find that Heaven [tian] emits its fluid everywhere. Among the many things of this world grain dispels hunger, and silk and hemp protect from cold. For that reason man eats grain, and wears silk and hemp. That Heaven does not produce grain, silk, and hemp purposely, in order to feed and cloth[e] mankind, follows from the fact that by calamitous changes it does not intend to reprove man. Things are produced spontaneously, and man wears and eats them; the fluid changes spontaneously, and man is frightened by it, for the usual theory is disheartening. Where would be spontaneity, if the heavenly signs were intentional, and where inaction [wu wei]?
