= Zhuzi jicheng =

1935 collection of Chinese philosophy

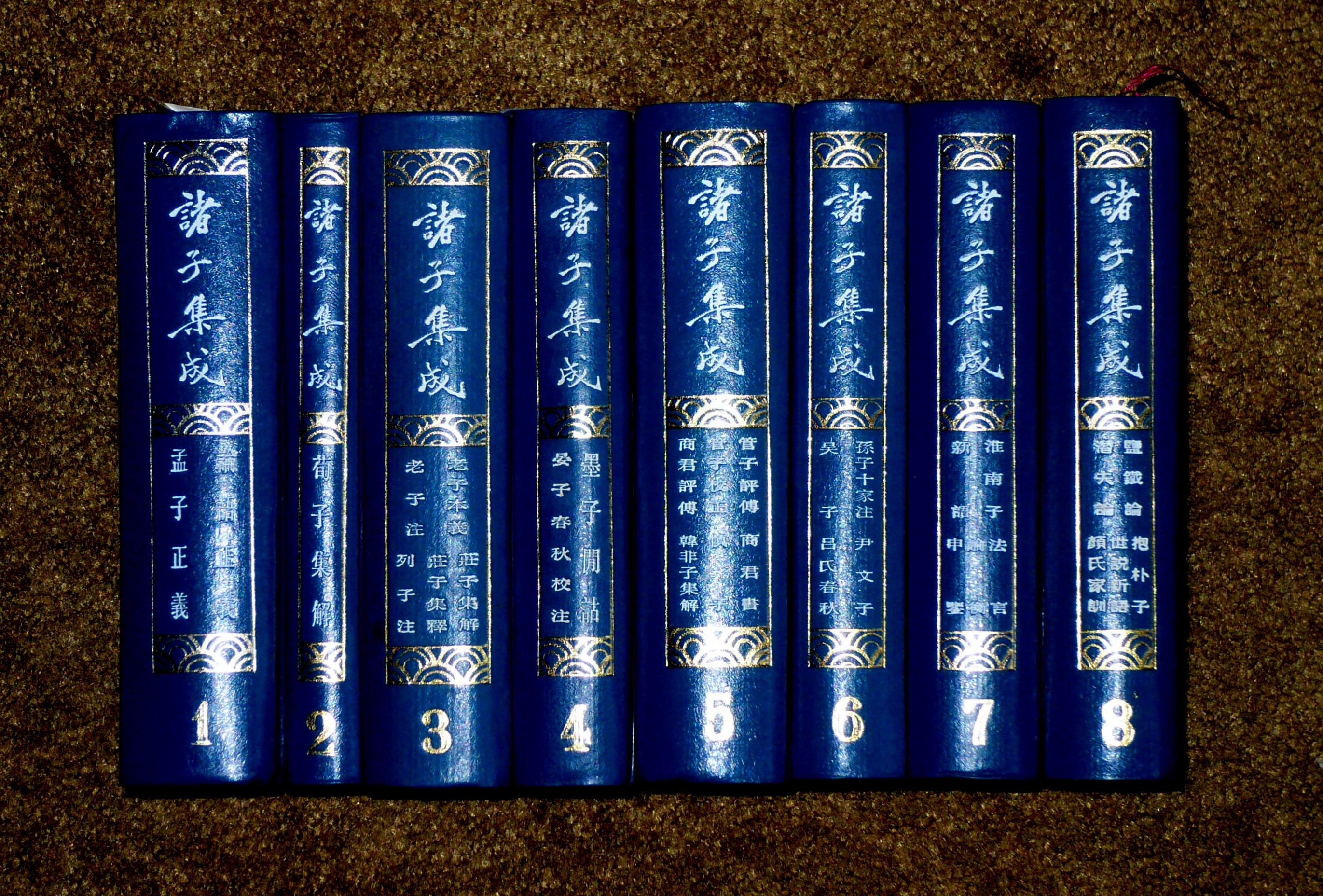
Zhuzi jicheng (eight-volume edition)

The Zhuzi jicheng (simplified Chinese: 诸子集成; traditional Chinese: 諸子集成; pinyin: Zhūzǐ jíchéng; Wade–Giles: Chu-tzu chi-ch'eng, abbreviated ZZJC, lit. "Complete Collection of the Masters"—that is, the thinkers and philosophers of ancient China) is a large compendium of philosophical works compiled by the Guoxue Zhengli She (simplified Chinese: 国学整理社; traditional Chinese: 國學整理社; pinyin: Guóxué Zhěnglǐ Shè).

This eight-volume congshu (叢書") of Chinese philosophy contains 28 texts with a total of 390 juan (scrolls). It includes representative works from all major schools of early Chinese thought, including Confucianism, Legalism, Taoism, Mohism, the School of the Military Strategists (Chinese: 兵家; pinyin: bīngjiā), the School of Miscellany (Chinese: 雜家; pinyin: zájia), the Agriculturalists (Chinese: 農家; pinyin: nóngjiā), and the xiaoshuo school (simplified Chinese: 小说家; traditional Chinese: 小說家). The texts range from the Pre-Qin period to the Northern and Southern dynasties.

Published in the 24th year of the Republic of China (1935) by World Books (simplified Chinese: 世界书局; traditional Chinese: 世界書局; pinyin: Shìjiè shūjú), the collection was reprinted in 1958 by Zhonghua Book Company (simplified Chinese: 中华书局; traditional Chinese: 中華書局; pinyin: Zhōnghuá Shūjú). It remains a widely available and frequently cited reference among modern scholars of Chinese philosophy.

The collection is divided into eight volumes, covering the following works (titles, number of juan, dynasty, and author/commentator are listed below).

I – II – III – IV – V – VI – VII – VIII

== Contents ==
=== Volume 1 ===
- Lunyu zhengyi 論語正義/论语正义, 24 juan, (Qing) Liu Baonan 劉寶楠/刘宝楠
- Mengzi zhengyi 孟子正義/孟子正义, 14 juan, (Qing) Jiao Xun 焦循

=== Volume 2 ===
- Xunzi jijie 荀子集解, 20 juan, (Qing) Wang Xianqian 王先謙/王先谦

=== Volume 3 ===
- Laozi Daodejing 老子道德經/老子道德经, 2 juan, (Zhou) Li Er 李耳, Anhang Yinyi 音义, 1 juan; (Wei) Wang Bi 王弼 (comm.); (Tang) Lu Deming 陸德明 (comm.)
- Laozi benyi 老子本義/老子本义, 2 juan, (Qing) Wei Yuan 魏源
- Zhuangzi jijie 莊子集解/庄子集解, 8 juan, (Qing) Wang Xianqian 王先謙/王先谦
- Zhuangzi jishi 莊子集釋/庄子集释, 10 juan, (Qing) Guo Qingfan 郭慶藩/郭庆藩
- Liezi 列子, 8 juan, (Zhou) Lie Yukou 列禦寇; (Jin) Zhang Zhan 張湛 (comm.)

=== Volume 4 ===
- Mozi jiangu 墨子閑詁/墨子间诂, 15 juan, Fulu 附錄/附录, 1 juan, Houyu 後語/后语, 2 juan, (Qing) Sun Yirang 孫詒讓
- Yanzi chunqiu jiaozhu 晏子春秋校注, 8 juan, (Rep.) Zhang Chunyi 張純一/张纯一

=== Volume 5 ===
- Guanzi jiaozheng 管子校正, 24 juan, (Qing) 戴望 Dai Wang
- Shangjunshu 商君書/商君书, 5 juan, (Zhou) Shang Yang 商鞅; (Qing) Yan Wanli 嚴萬里/严可均 (comm.), 1 juan
- Shenzi 慎子, 1 juan, Yiwen 逸文, 1 juan, (Zhou) Shen Dao 慎到; (Qing) Qian Xizuo 錢熙祚/钱熙祚 (comm.)
- Hanfeizi jijie 韓非子集解/韩非子集解, 20 juan, (Qing) Wang Xianshen 王先慎

=== Volume 6 ===
- Sunzi shijia zhu 孫子十家注/孙子十家注 (Sunzi bingfa 孫子兵法), 13 juan, Anhang Xulu 敍錄/校录, 1 juan (Zhou) Sun Wu; (Wei) Cao Cao 曹操 et al. (comm.); (Qing) Sun Xingyan 孫星衍, Wu Renji 吳人驥 (comm.)
- Wuzi 吳子/吴子, 6 juan, (Zhou) Wu Qi 吳起/吴起; (Qing) Sun Xingyan 孫星衍/孙星衍 (comm.)
- Yinwenzi 尹文子, 1 juan, (Zhou) Yin Wen 尹文; (Qing) Qian Xizuo 錢熙祚/钱熙祚 (comm.)
- Lüshi chunqiu 呂氏春秋/吕氏春秋, 26 juan, (Qin) Lü Buwei 呂不韋/吕不韦; (Han) Gao You 高誘/高诱 (comm.)

=== Volume 7 ===
- Xinyu 新語/新语, 3 juan, (Han) Lu Jia 陸賈/陆贾
- Huainanzi 淮南子, 21 juan, (Han) Liu An 劉安/刘安; (Han) Gao You 高誘/高诱 (comm.); (Qing) Zhuang Kuiji 莊逵吉 (comm.)
- Yantielun 鹽鐵論/盐铁论, 10 juan, (Han) Huan Kuan 桓寬 / 桓宽
- Yangzi fayan 揚子法言/扬子法言 (Fayan 法言), 13 juan, (Han) Yang Xiong 揚雄/扬雄; (Jin) Li Gui 李軌/李轨 (comm.)
- Lunheng 論衡/论衡, 30 juan, (Han) Wang Chong 王充

=== Volume 8 ===
- Qianfulun 潛夫論/潜夫论, 10 juan, (Han) Wang Fu 王符; (Qing) Wang Jibei 汪繼培/汪继培 (comm.)
- Shenjian 申鑒 /申鉴, 5 juan (Han) Xun Yue 荀悅/荀悦
- Baopuzi neipian 抱朴子 內篇, 25 juan
- Baopuzi waipian 抱朴子 外篇, 50 juan, (Jin) Ge Hong 葛洪; (Qing) Sun Xingyan 孫星衍 (comm.)
- Shishuo xinyu 世說新語/世说新语, 6 juan, (Liu Song) Liu Yiqing 劉義慶/刘义庆; (Liang) Liu Xiaobiao 劉孝標 (comm.)
- Yanshi jiaxun 顏氏家訓/颜氏家训, 7 juan, Anhang Kaozheng 考證/考证, 1 juan, (Northern Qi) Yan Zhitui 顏之推/颜之推 (Shen Kui 沈揆, Kaozheng)

== See also ==
- Baizi quanshu
- Glossary of Chinese philosophy

== Bibliography ==
- Li Xueqin 李学勤, and Lü Wenyu 吕文郁 (eds.): Siku da cidian 四庫大辭典/四库大辞典. Changchun: Jilin daxue chubanshe 1996, vol. 2, p. 2106 (Text in an archived online version)

== Weblinks ==
- ctext.org
