= Wang Xianshen =

Wang Xianshen (Chinese: 王先慎; pinyin: Wáng Xiānshèn; Wade–Giles: Wang Hsien-shen; 1859–1922), courtesy name (zi) Huiying (慧英), was a scholar of the late Qing dynasty. He was a native of Changsha, Hunan. He was the younger brother of the eminent scholar Wang Xianqian (1842–1918).

== Han Feizi jijie ==
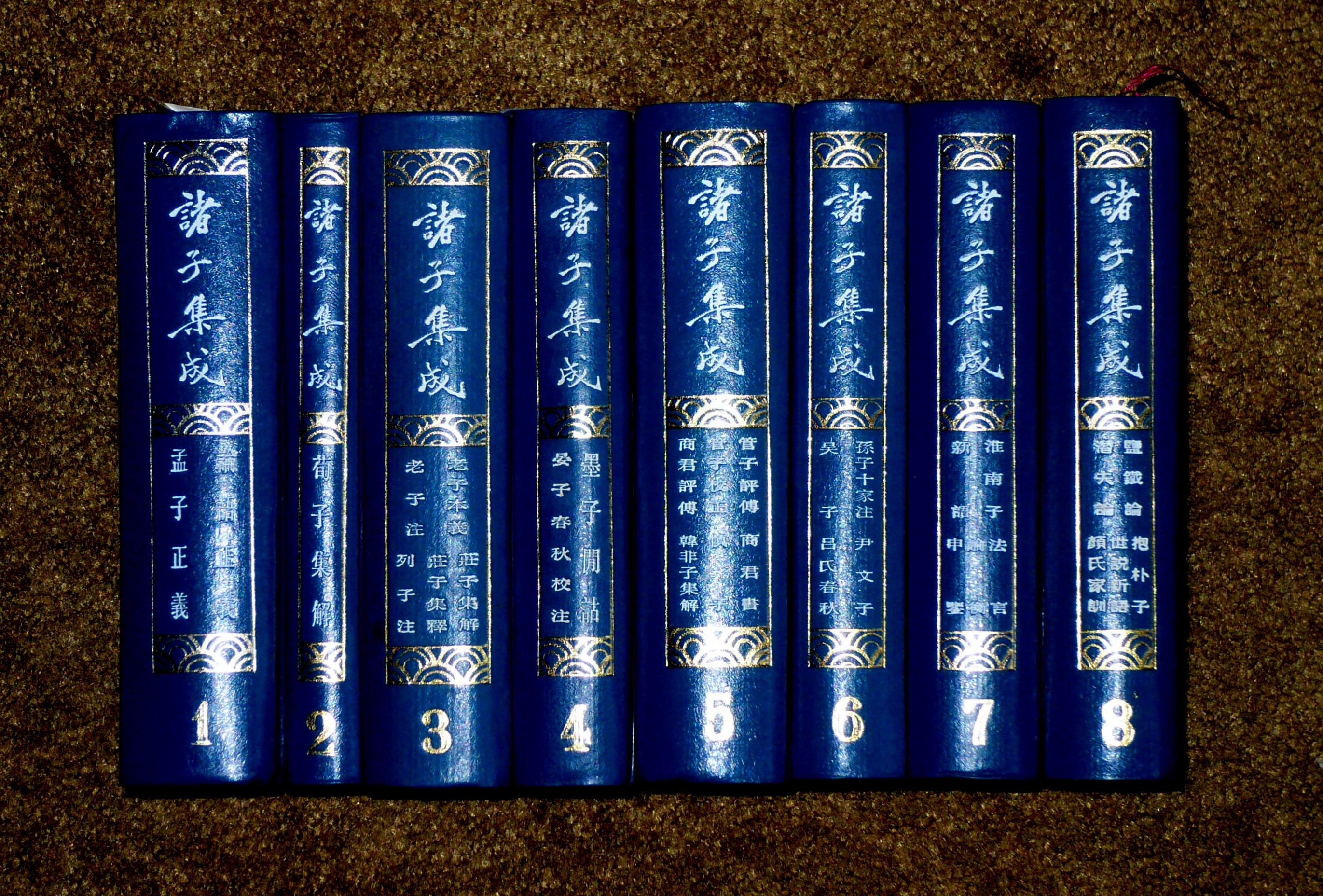
Zhuzi jicheng (eight-volume edition), volume 5 with the Han Feizi jijie by (Qing) Wang Xianshen

Wang Xianshen is best known as the author of a critical edition of the Han Feizi, the Han Feizi jijie (simplified Chinese: 韩非子集解; traditional Chinese: 韓非子集解; Wade–Giles: Han Fei-tzu chi-chieh; in 20 juan), a work attributed to the important Legalist thinker of the Warring States period. His edition, which includes Wang's own preface, was first published in 1896 and reprinted several times. It was later incorporated into the collection Zhuzi jicheng, a standard source also used by the Hanyu da zidian (HYDZD).

Wang based his work primarily on a Song dynasty edition of the text, incorporating emendations and annotations by Qing dynasty scholars. The edition contains an essay discussing the authenticity of the Han Feizi, as well as a collection of fragments attributed to Han Fei.

== Selected works ==
- Han Feizi jijie 韩非子集解 (in Zhuzi jicheng, Zhonghua shuju, 1978)

== See also ==
- Liang Qixiong 梁启雄 (1900–1965)
