= Peng Yulin =

- 彭玉麟
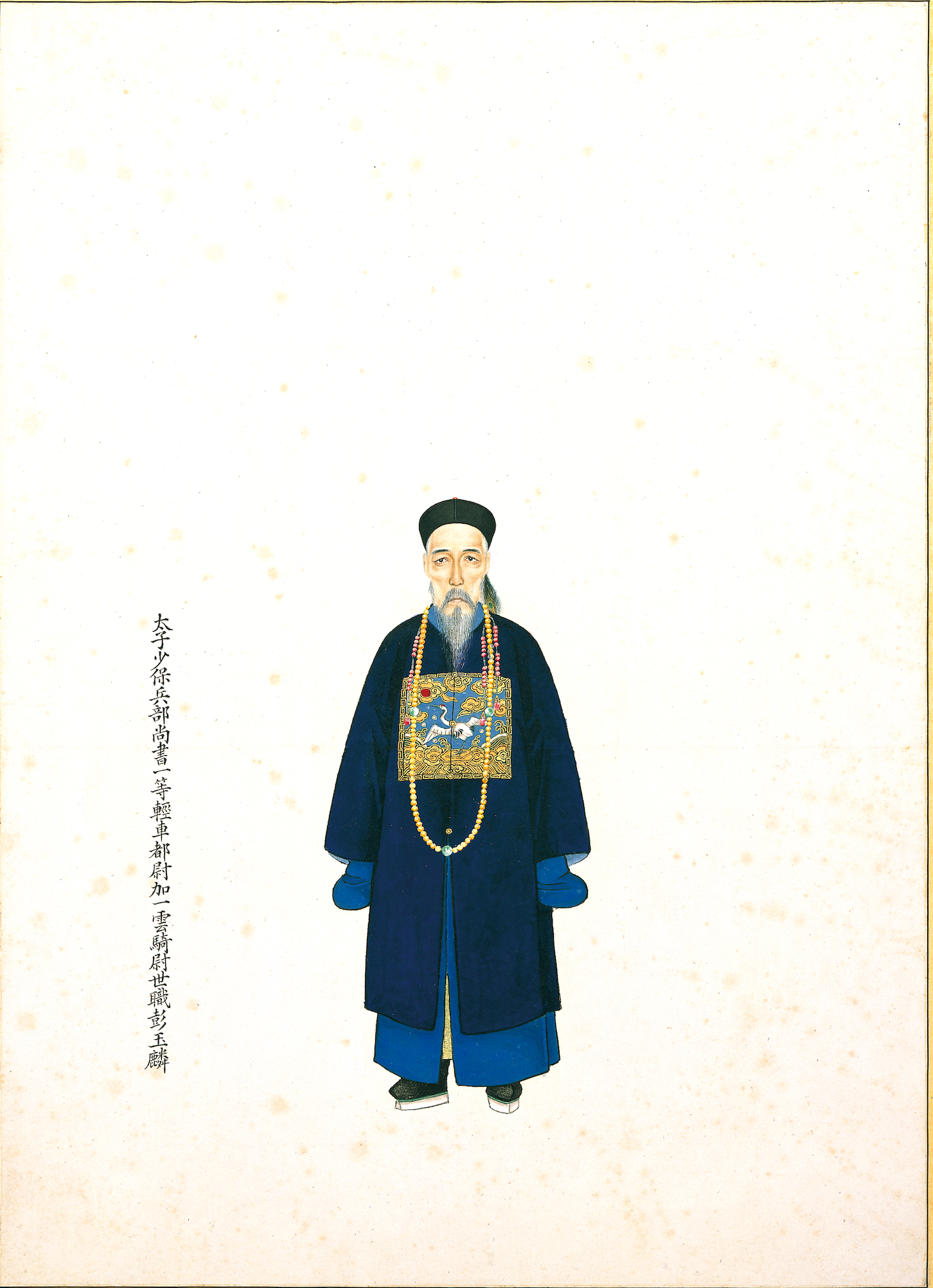
- Born: the 14th day of the 12th month of the 21st year of the Jiaqing Emperor （1817.1.30） Anqing Anhui
- Died: the 6th day of the 3rd month of the 16th year of the Guangxu Emperor （1890.4.24） Tuisheng An, on the eastern bank of the Xiang River in Hen
- Other name: Peng Xueqin
- Education: xiucai (licentiate)
- Occupation: military officer

Peng Yulin（Chinese：彭玉麟）(January 30, 1817 – April 24, 1890), also written as Yulin, courtesy name Xueqin(also Xueqin), art name Tuisheng An(Other uses for Tuisheng'an), was originally from Zhajiang, Hengyang, Hunan. He was a late Qing dynasty general of the Xiang Army.Born as a Shengyuan (xiucai), he rendered meritorious service in the suppression of the Taiping Heavenly Kingdom. He successively served as Viceroy of Liangjiang and Minister of War, was Posthumous name the title of Taizi Taibao, and received the posthumous nameGangzhi.Peng Yulin, together with Zeng Guofan and Zuo Zongtang, was known as the “Three Great Figures of the Qing Dynasty.” He was also counted among the “Four Famous Officials of the Qing Restoration” alongside Zeng Guofan, Zuo Zongtang, and Hu Linyi (in some accounts, Peng Yulin is replaced by Li Hongzhang)..

== Life ==
=== Early years ===
Peng Yulin’s father was Peng Mingjiu, a native of Zhajiang, Hengyang, Hunan, who later went to Hefei, Anhui, to serve as a xunjian (patrol officer) of Liangyuan. Peng Yulin’s mother was from Anqing, Anhui. In the 21st year of the Jiaqing reign (1816), Peng Yulin was born in Anqing, Anhui. In the 12th year of the Daoguang reign (1832), his family returned to their native place with his father. The following year, due to bullying by clan members, his father fell ill from distress and died in resentment. The family’s farmland was subsequently seized by relatives, forcing Peng Yulin and his mother to take refuge in the prefectural city. As a youth, Peng Yulin worked as a shushi (clerical copyist) in the Hengzhou garrison of the Green Standard Army to support his mother. Prefect Gao Renjian, impressed by Peng Yulin’s writings, recruited him into the prefectural office, where he was admitted as a Shengyuan (xiucai).

In 1849, during the 29th year of the Daoguang Emperor's reign, the Li Yuanfa uprising broke out in Xinning, Hunan. Peng Yulin participated in its suppression together with the Hengzhou Brigade of the Green Standard Army. When military merits were later evaluated, the responsible officials mistakenly regarded Peng as a military shengyuan and appointed him only as a waiwei (external officer) of the Linwu Battalion. Peng declined the appointment..

=== Career in the Hunan Army ===
In 1853, Peng Yulin, following Zeng Guofan, established the Xiang Army navy and fought against the Taiping forces. The following year, he defeated the Taiping Heavenly Kingdom at the Battle of Xiangtan and was appointed County magistrate.

He later took part in the capture of Yuezhou and was promoted to tongzhi (subprefect, fifth rank). He repeatedly defeated the Taiping naval forces at Wuhan and Tianjiazhen. In February 1855, he was defeated by Shi Dakai at Hukouin Jiangxi. Thereafter, he reorganized the navy and, in coordination with land forces, defeated the Taiping troops at Zhangshu and Linjiang in 1856, for which he was promoted to daotai (circuit intendant) of the Huichaojia Circuit in Guangdong.

In 1857, together with Yang Zaifu and others, he attacked Hukou and subsequently captured Jiujiang and Anqing. He was later appointed Grand coordinator and provincial governor of Anhui, but strongly declined the post and was instead made Admiral, later being promoted to the Ministry of War (Imperial China).

In 1862 (the first year of the Tongzhi reign), he led naval forces to support Zeng Guoquan’s army advancing eastward along the Yangtze River, blockading the mouth of the defensive moat of Tianjing. In 1863, together with Yang Zaifu and others, he captured Jiangpu, Jiufuzhou, and Pukou, thereby cutting off the grain supply routes to Tianjing. After the fall of Tianjing, he was awarded the hereditary title of First-Class Light Chariot Commander and granted the honorary title of Junior Guardian of the Heir Apparent (Taizi Shaobao).

In 1868, he joined Zeng Guofan in memorializing the throne to establish the organizational system of the Yangtze River navy. The following spring, he returned to his native place. In 1872, he was ordered to inspect the naval forces along the Yangtze. In 1881 (the 7th year of the Guangxu reign), he was appointed Acting Viceroy of Liangjiang, but again declined the appointment and remained in charge of riverine and coastal defense. In 1883, he was promoted to Minister of War (second rank, junior first class).

=== The Sino French War ===
In 1884, the Sino-French War broke out, and Peng Yulin was ordered to Guangdong for defense. In 1885, he joined Feng Zicai in resisting French forces at Friendship Pass and Lang Son, achieving major victories, and repeatedly opposed peace talks with his view of “five reasons to fight and five reasons not to make peace.”After a peace agreement was reached, troops were withdrawn. In 1888, while inspecting the Yangtze navy, he retired due to illness after reaching Anqing.

=== Illness and death ===
On the 6th day of the 3rd month of the 16th year of the Guangxu reign (April 24, 1890), he died of illness at Tuisheng An on the eastern bank of the Xiang River in Hengzhou. He was posthumously granted the title of Taizi Taibao, given the posthumous name Gangzhi, and honored with the construction of a dedicated shrine. Yu Yue composed the Stele Inscription for the Spirit Way of Lord Peng Gangzhi.

== Conduct ==
Peng Yulin was locally renowned as an incorruptible official. From the 5th year of the Xianfeng reign to the 1st year of the Tongzhi reign, he was entitled to more than 21,500 taels of yanglian yin (honesty allowance), all of which he turned over to the state treasury as military funds. In the 7th year of Tongzhi (1868), he wrote in a memorial: "I have never been fond of sensual pleasures or family comforts, nor inclined toward ease. In more than ten years of leading troops, I have never built even a single house or acquired a single mu of land to shelter my wife and children. Though grievously wounded and afflicted by accumulated illness, I have never once requested leave to return home for recuperation. All year round, I have remained amid wind, waves, and flying arrows and stones; even when severely ill, I have not spent a single day ashore." His uprightness and probity were as well known locally as the Neo-Confucian moral teachings found in Zeng Guofan's family letters. In 1864, Peng Yulin had Liu Shoutian, a close subordinate of Zeng, punished by ear-cutting and dismissal, prompting Zeng to write in reproach: "If it is said this was not an intentional provocation, who would believe it?" and "If such actions were applied to you by others, could you accept them?" In his later years, while inspecting the Yangtze region, Peng impeached more than one hundred officials. He ordered the execution of Hu Kaitai, a deputy general in Anqing who had summoned a prostitute and murdered his wife, and of Tan Zhulun, a deputy general in Hubei, who had raped Liu, the wife of Zhang Qingsheng, and killed her to silence her.

Peng was also deeply distressed by the mass killing of civilians attributed to Zeng Guoquan, the brother of Zeng Guofan. On two occasions—the Siege of Anqing in 1861 and the Siege of Nanjing in 1864—he wrote to Zeng Guofan urging that his brother be executed for the sake of justice. Zeng, however, replied in his brother’s defense: “My younger brother shows no signs of Rebellion of the Three Guards; on what grounds should he be executed? I do not know what offense he has given you to provoke such resentment,” and further insisted that there had been no breach of military discipline.

== Artistic accomplishments in calligraphy and painting ==
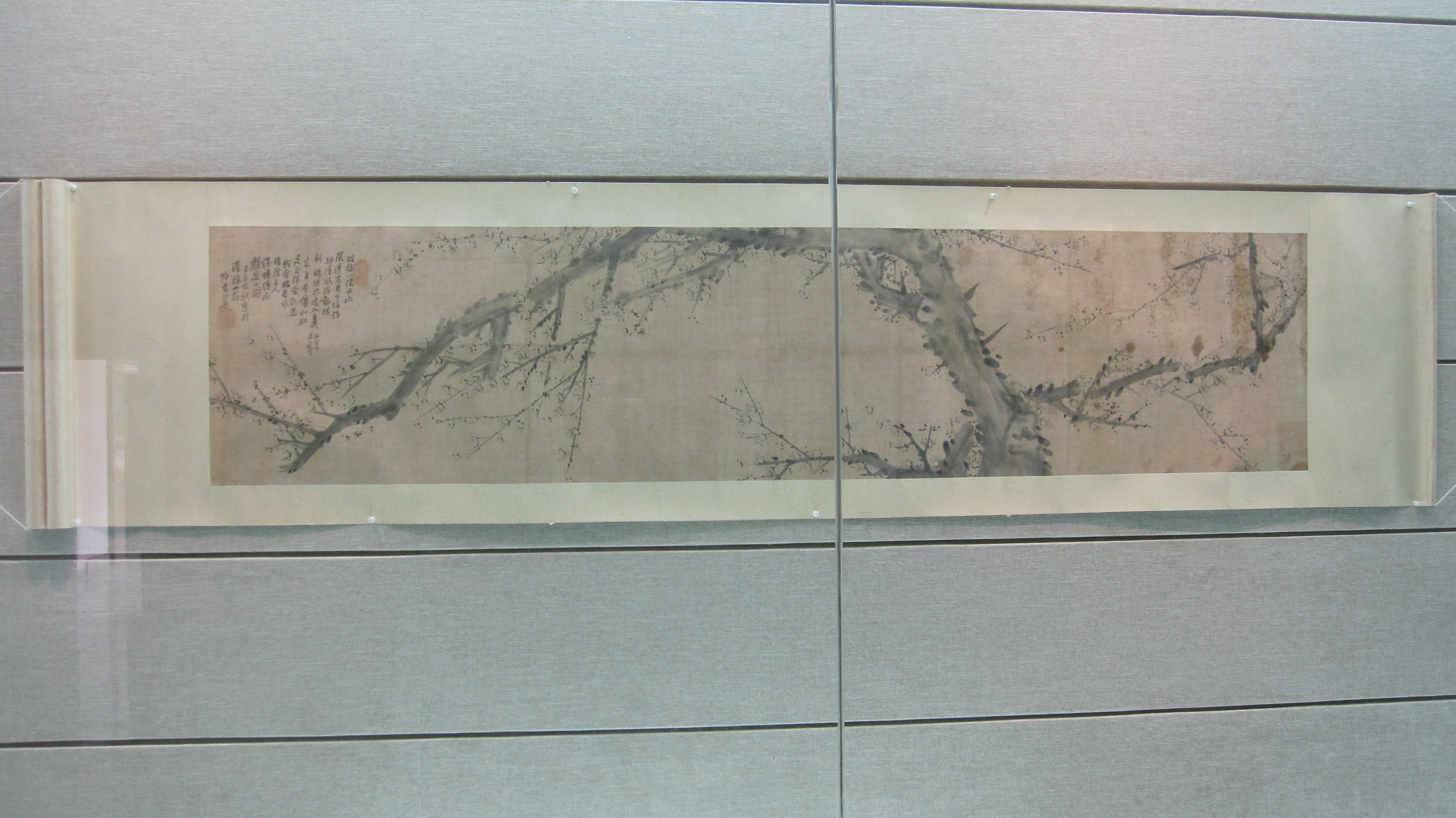
A painting by Peng Yulin exhibited at the Hengyang Museum

Peng Yulin painted and composed poetry in his spare time from military affairs. His poems were later compiled and published under the title Peng Gangzhi shiji (Collected Poems of Peng Gangzhi). The collection, prefaced and edited by the Qing dynasty scholar Yu Yue, contains more than 400 poems that largely reflect the major events of Peng’s life. In 2007, Tang Longping, president of the Hengyang Collectors Association, discovered a Guangxu 17 (1891) Suzhou-printed edition of the work in Hengyang County, consisting of two volumes in eight juan.

Peng’s paintings are especially noted for ink depictions of plum blossoms; his plum blossoms and the bamboo paintings of Zheng Banqiao are regarded as two outstanding achievements of Qing painting. Chen Liguo and Wei Ming of the Changsha Museum described his calligraphy as “natural and vivid, rhythmically expressive, and forceful in brushwork”.

Peng Yulin's artistic works did not begin to attract wider public attention until the 21st century. Although their market prices were initially modest, their value rose significantly in recent years. In 2011, his Seven-character Couplet in Running Script was sold for 313,600 yuan at Moshengjia, while Four Panels of Plum Blossoms fetched 322,000 yuan at Shanghai Baolong. In 2012, Calligraphy Screen was sold for 504,000 yuan at Sichuan Jiacheng.. In October 2008, China Central Television recorded a special episode of the television program Treasures Everywhere, titled Treasures Everywhere: Entering Hengyang, in which one of Peng Yulin's ink plum paintings was selected as a "folk national treasure of Hengyang".

In the 7th year of the Xianfeng reign (1857), while leading the Xiang Army navy and land forces in a joint attack against the Taiping forces, Peng left a stone inscription at Shizhong Mountain in Hukou County reading “Arrows sink to the hilt, feathers submerged; with sincere intent, even stone may be pierced.” This inscription was only rediscovered by the local government in 2009. He also created a “Red Plum Blossom Stele at Yu Tower” in Hangzhou, depicting plum trees in varied density, inscribed with the words “Qiaoren Xueqin of the Seventy-two Peaks also records this” .

== Contributions to cultural development ==
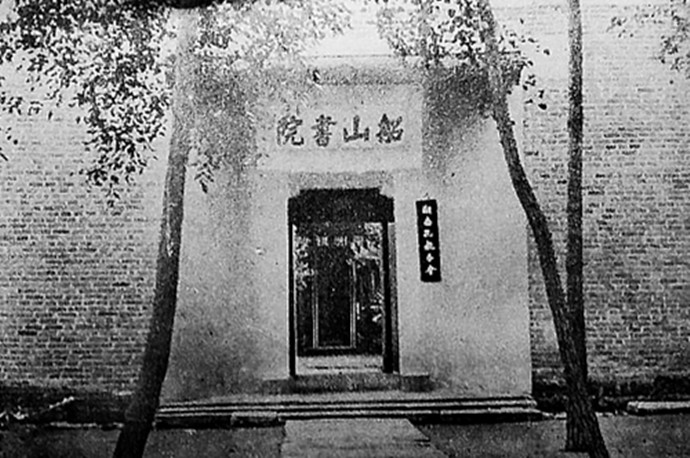
Chuanshan Academy in the late Qing Dynasty and early Republic of China

- Construction of Chuanshan Academy: In 1878, while serving as Minister of War, Peng Yulin supported Zhang Xianhe in establishing Chuanshan Academy in the Wang clan ancestral hall at Wangyaping in Hengyang. After the academy declined, Peng rebuilt it in 1885 on Dongzhou Island and personally invited the renowned scholar Wang Kaiyun to serve as its head.
- Compilation of the Hengyang County Gazetteer: The Tongzhi-era Hengyang County Gazetteer (published in the 11th year of Tongzhi, 1872) was prefaced and compiled under Peng Yulin’s direction.
- Restoration of Yingjiang Temple: During his tenure as Governor of Anhui and Naval Commander, Peng raised funds to restore Yingjiang Temple in Anqing.
- Peng Yulin also sponsored the restoration of Shizhong Mountain. The mountain originally housed a stone stele of the Record of Stone Bell Mountain by Su Shi, which had been destroyed during the Taiping Rebellion. Peng later ordered the stele to be recarved and restored.He also constructed scenic sites on Shizhong Mountain, including Baochi Chanlin and Huanxiang Villa. Peng personally explored the caves of the mountain in his research and subsequently wrote the essay Shizhong Dong Xu (“Preface to the Cave of Stone Bell Mountain”)..

== Personal life ==
=== Family ===
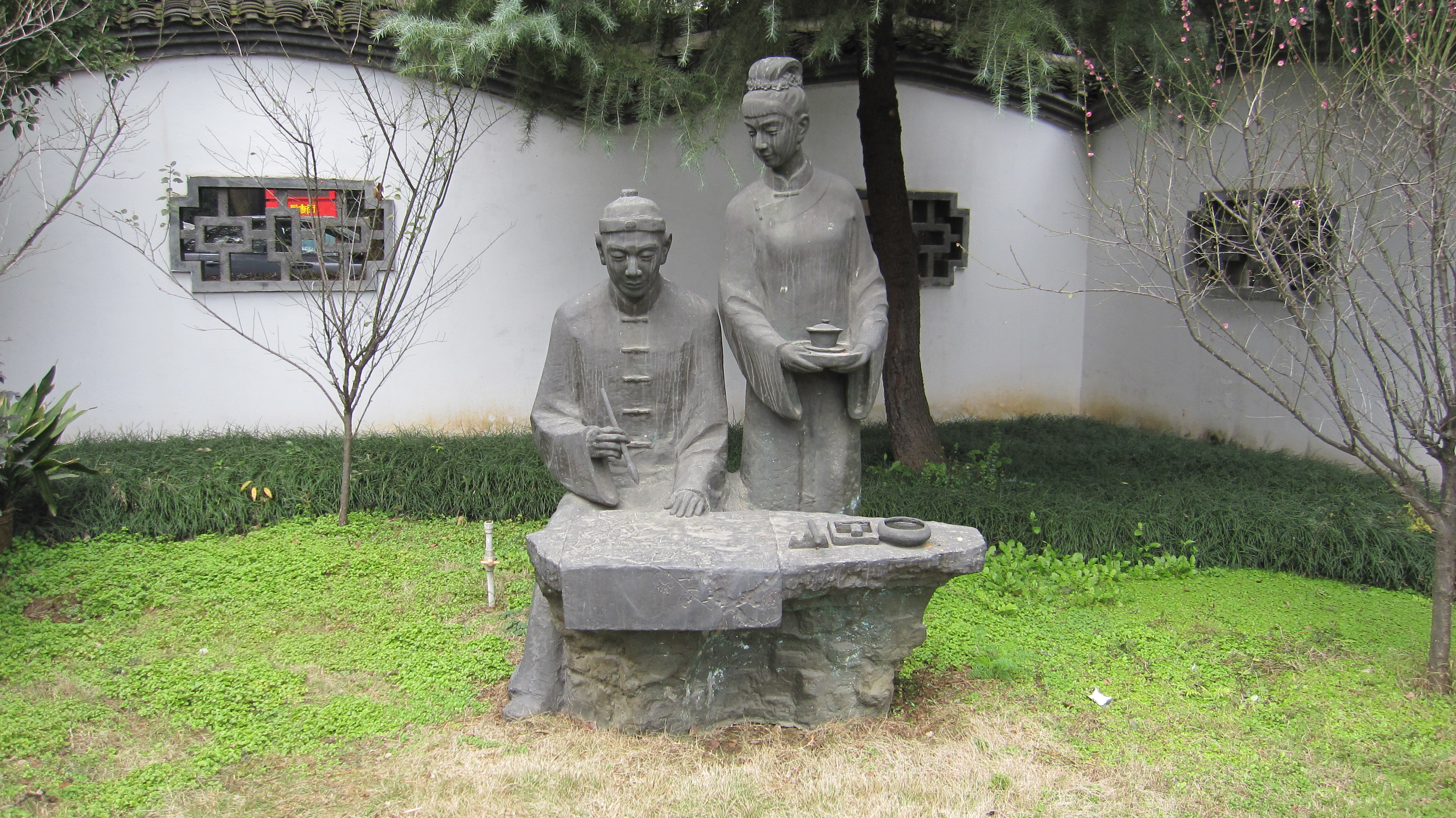
The statues of Peng Yulin and Mei Gu in the Provincial Retreat Temple

Father: Peng Mingjiu, inspector of Liangyuan in Hefei, Anhui.

Wife: Zou Shi

Granddaughter: Peng Jianzhen, married to Yu Biyun, the grandson of Yu Yue, a master of Pu Xue, and a flower scout in the Wuxu year of the Guangxu reign (1898).

Great grandchildren: Peng Xiaobing, Peng Youjia.

Descendants: Peng Shuduan, married to Chu Tunan, former chairman of the Central Committee of the Democratic League and former vice chairman of the National People's Congress.

== Emotion ==
Peng Yulin fell in love with his maternal grandmother's adopted daughter, Meigu (verified by Luo Ergang in 1946, Meigu's real name was Zhubin), but due to Meigu's seniority as Peng Yulin's aunt, the two could not marry and each married separately. Later, Meigu died due to childbirth difficulties. Peng Yulin spent his whole life painting plum blossoms in memory of Mei Gu.

== Evaluation ==
Mao Zedong's secretary Li Rui relayed Zhou Enlai's words in the "Record of the Lushan Conference", and Peng Dehuai said he admired Peng Yulin.

Peng Dehuai's office secretary Wang Yazhi also recalled that Peng Dehuai had expressed his agreement with Peng Yulin's "reckless" life.

== Commemoration for future generations ==
=== Memorial facilities ===
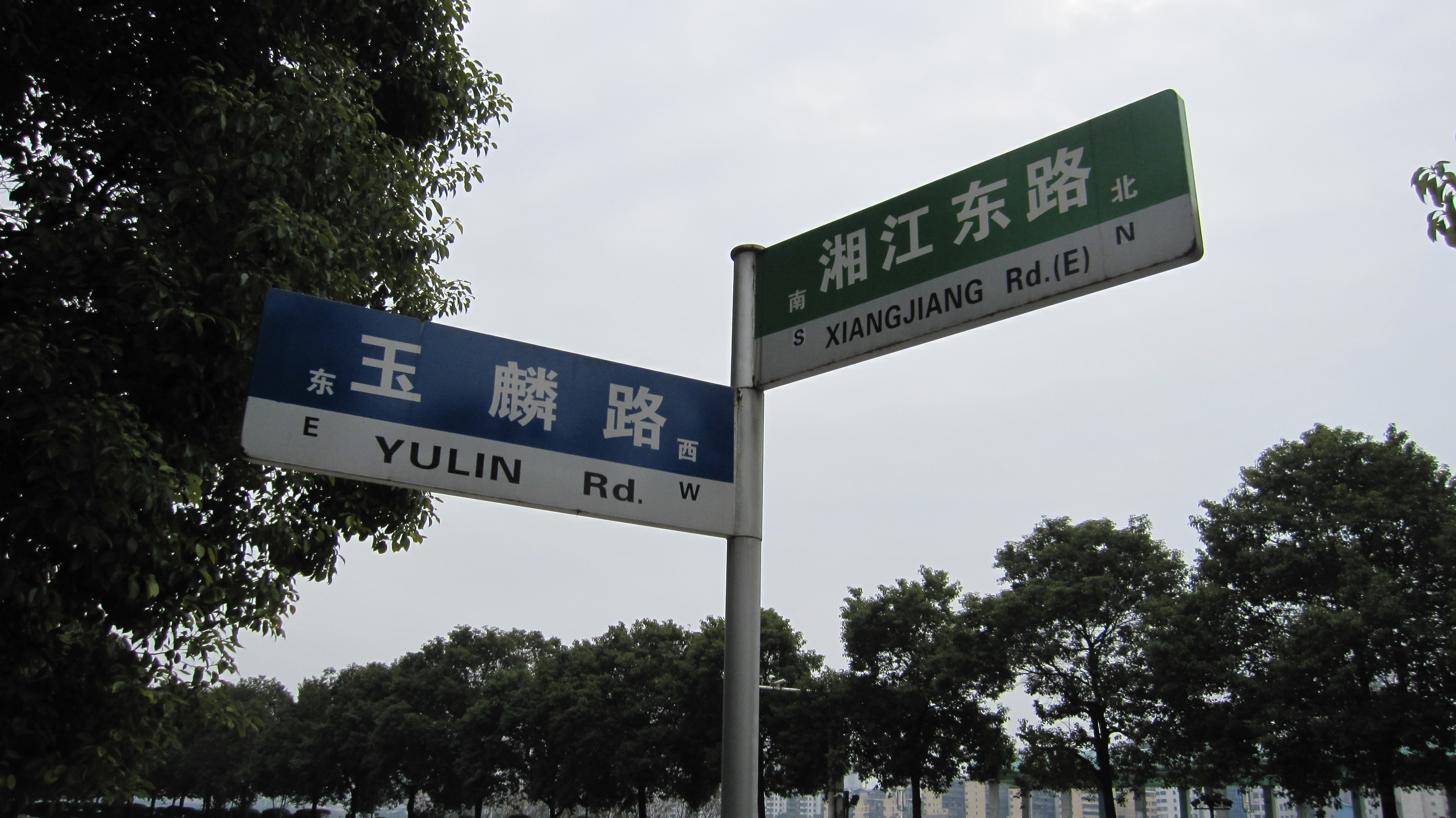
The road named after Peng Yulin

Yulin Road: There is a road in Zhuhui District, Hengyang City that intersects with Xiangjiang East Road and is named "Yulin Road". It is not far from the Provincial Retreat Temple and can be passed by the Hengyang 100 bus.

Peng Yulin Tomb: Located halfway up Pengzu Mountain in Nantang Village, Zhangmu Township, Hengyang County. The cemetery faces north in the south, and the square garden is more than 100 meters long, with white jade carvings of Han Dynasty such as stone horses and stone sheep. It is a cultural relic protection unit in Hengyang County.

Hangzhou Provincial Retreat Temple: Peng Yulin established the Provincial Retreat Temple in West Lake, Hangzhou, which is now located at the current San Tan Yin Yue scenic spot.

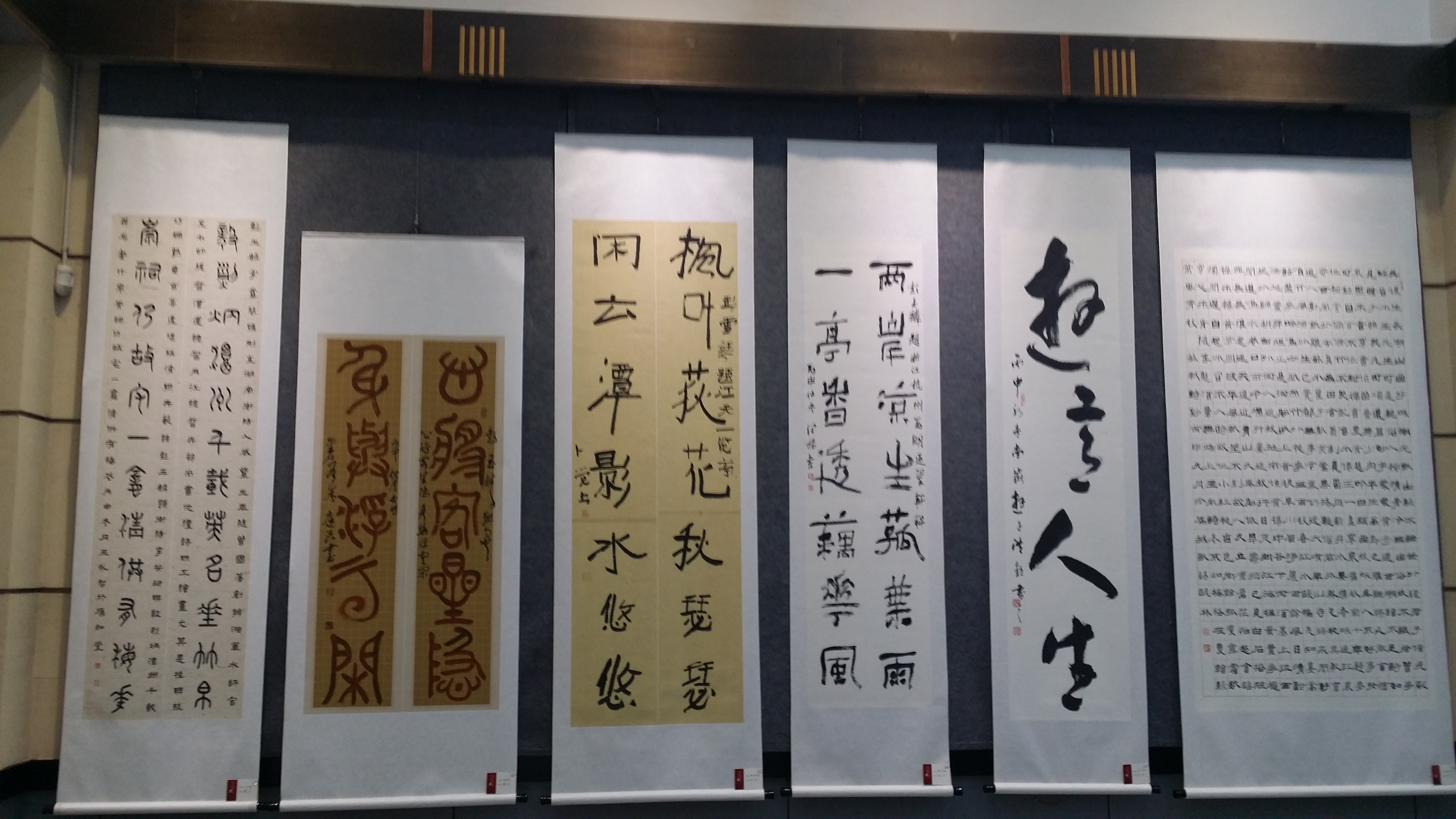
Hengyang Museum Commemorating the 200th Anniversary of Peng Yulin's Birth Calligraphy and Painting Exhibition

Hengyang Provincial Retreat Temple: After returning to Hengzhou in the spring of 1869, Peng Yulin built the Peng Family Garden, also known as the Provincial Retreat Temple, which no longer exists. The Hengyang Municipal Government rebuilt the Yang Family Temple.

Peng Yulin's Zhajiang Former Residence: Peng Yulin's hometown is located in Hehe Village, Zhajiang Town, Hengyang County. He lived here in his early years, but the former residence is now dilapidated. Peng Yulin's Peng family members raised funds together to restore Peng Yulin's former residence, which was first opened to the public on December 24, 2013.

Peng Yulin's Former Residence in Anqing: Peng Yulin's father, Peng Mingjiu, was once selected to be a patrol inspector in Sanqiao Town, Huaining County, Anqing Prefecture, Anhui Province. Peng Yulin was born in Huaining County, his mother was from Anqing, and his maternal grandfather lived on Huangjiapo (Huangjia Mountain)in Anqing. Peng Yulin also has a former residence in Anqing City, Anhui Province, which is the former residence of a celebrity in Anqing City.

Peng Yulin's Statue of Integrity: There is a statue of Peng Yulin carved in the Hengyang City Integrity Culture Sculpture Park.

=== Commemorative event ===
In 2016, the 200th anniversary of Peng Yulin’s birth was commemorated with various activities organized by different sectors of society. In the New Year of 2017, China Post issued a greeting card titled “Commemorating the 200th Anniversary of the Birth of Peng Yulin, Successor to Chuanshan”.

Beginning on January 4, 2017, a calligraphy and painting exhibition marking the bicentenary of Peng Yulin’s birth was held at the Hengyang Museum. On January 11, 2017, Hengyang City hosted an academic symposium to commemorate the 200th anniversary of his birth
