= Guyi congshu =

Qing collectaneum

Guyi congshu (simplified Chinese: 古逸丛书; traditional Chinese: 古逸叢書; pinyin: Gǔyì cóngshū; Wade–Giles: Ku-i ts'ung-shu, abb. GYCS; „Collectanea of ancient lost books“) is a Chinese series (congshu), compiled by Li Shuchang 黎庶昌 (1837–1897) in the years 1882–84. It includes 26 books with a total size of 198 juan. Another collection, titled as a continuation of the Guyi congshu, the Xu Guyi congshu (续古逸丛书 /續古逸叢書) by Zhang Yuanji 张元济, was published in 1922 (Shanghai: Shangwu), another continuation is the Guyi congshu sanbian 古逸丛书三编/古逸叢書三編.

The Chunqiu Guliang zhuan 春秋穀梁傳 (Guliang Commentary on the Spring and Autumn Annals), in 12 volumes (juan 卷), for example, is incorporated with an appended volume of gaoyi 考異 (“textual variants and critical notes”) and an appended volume of tiyao 提要 (“summary” or “abstract”), collected and annotated (jijie 集解) by Fan Ning 范甯 of the Jin dynasty, with phonetic and semantic glosses (yinyi 音義) by Lu Deming 陸德明 of the Tang dynasty, and critical studies (zhuankaoyi 撰考異) by Yang Shoujing 楊守敬 of the Qing dynasty, based on the Shaoxi edition 紹熙本 of the Song dynasty.

== Contents ==
The volumes are:

=== Guyi congshu ===
- 1. Erya 爾雅, 3 juan, (Jin) Guo Pu 郭璞 (comm.)
- 2. Chunqiu Guliang zhuan 春秋穀粱傳, 12 juan, (Jin) Fan Ning 范甯 (comm.)
- 3. Lunyu 論語. 10 juan, (Wei) He Yan 何晏 (comm.)
- 4. Zhouyi 周易, 6 juan

Hui'an Xiansheng jiaozheng Zhouyi xici jingyi (附) 晦庵先生校正周易繫辭精義, 2 juan, (Song) Cheng Yi 程頤 (transm.)
Lü Zuqian 呂祖謙 (comm.)

- 5. Xiaojing 孝經, 1 juan, (Tang) Emperor Xuanzong 唐玄宗 (comm.)
- 6. Laozi Daodejing zhu 老子道德經注, 2 juan, (Jin) Wang Bi 王弼 (comm.)
- 7. Xunzi 荀子, 20 juan, (Tang) Yang Jing 楊倞 (comm.)
- 8. Nanhua zhenjing zhushu 南華眞經注疏, 10 juan, (Jin) Guo Xiang 郭象 (comm.); (Tang) Cheng Xuanying 成玄英 (comm.)
- 9. Chuci jizhu 楚辭集注, 8 juan

Chuci bianzheng 楚辭辨證, 2 juan
Chuci houyu 楚辭後語, 6 juan, (Song) Zhu Xi 朱熹 (comm.)

- 10. Shangshu shiyin 尚書釋音, 1 juan, (Tang) Lu Deming 陸德明
- 11. Yupian lingjuan 玉篇零卷, (Liang) Gu Yewang 顧野王
- 12. Da-Song chongxiu Guangyun 大宋重修廣韻, 5 juan

Songben Guangyun 宋本廣韻, 5 juan
Zhaji 校札 一卷 (Song) Chen Pengnian 陳彭年
13. Guangyun 廣韻, 5 juan, (NN)

- 14. Yuzhu baodian 玉燭寶典, 12 juan, (Sui) Du Taiqing 杜臺卿
- 15. Wenguan cilin 文館詞林, preserved 14 juan (Tang) Xu Jingzong 許敬宗 et al.
- 16. Diaoyuji 琱玉集, fractional edition, 2 juan, (Tang) NN
- 17. Xingjie 姓解, 3 juan, (Song) Shao Si 邵思 (comp.)
- 18. Yunjing 韻鏡, 1 juan (Song) NN
- 19. Ribenguo jianzai shu mulu / Nihonkoku genzai sho mokuroku 日本國見在書目錄 (Catalogue of books present in Japan), 1 juan (Japan) Fujiwara no Sukeyo 藤原佐世
- 20. Shilüe 史略, 6 ce, (Song) Gao Sisun 高似孫
- 21. Hanshu shihuo zhi 漢書食貨志, 1 juan, (Tang) Yan Shigu 顏師古 (comm.)
- 22. Jijiupian 急就篇, 1 juan, (Han) Shi You 史遊
- 23. Du Gongbu Caotang shihua 杜工部草堂詩話, 2 juan

Nianpu 年譜, 2 juan
Du Gongbu Caotang shi 杜工部草堂詩 箋, 40 juan
Huangshi ji qianjia zhu Du Gongbu shi-shi buyi (附)黃氏集千家註杜工部詩史補遺, 10 juan
Jizhu Caotang Du Gongbu shi waiji (附)集註草堂杜工部詩外集, 1 juan, (Tang) Du Fu 杜甫; (Song) Cai Mengbi 蔡夢弼, Zhao Zili 趙子櫟 (chronicle); Lu Yin 魯訔, Cai Mengbi 蔡夢弼 (comp., comm.)
Huang He (app.) 黃鶴 (comm.)
Cai Mengbi (app.) 蔡夢弼 (comm.)

- 24. Jieshi diao Youlan 碣石調幽蘭, 1 juan (Chen) Qiu Gongming 丘公明
- 25. Tiantaishan ji 天台山記, 1 juan (Tang) Xu Lingfu 徐靈府
- 26. Taiping huanyu ji 太平寰宇記 補闕, 6 juan (113–118) (Song) Yue Shi 樂史

==== Example: Nanhua zhenjing zhushu (Zhuangzi zhushu 庄子注疏) ====
The edition of the book Zhuangzi (庄子) from the Southern Song period (1127–1279), belonging to the textual type of Zhuangzi commentaries that includes the Guo Xiang commentary (Guo Xiang zhu 郭象注) and the Cheng Xuanying sub-commentary (Cheng Xuanying shu 成玄英疏), is reproduced in the Guyi congshu and titled Nanhua zhenjing zhushu (南华真经注疏). This edition formed the basis for the annotated edition Zhuangzi jishi (庄子集释) by Guo Qingfan 郭庆藩, published in the 21st year of the Guangxu era (1895) by Sixian shuju (思贤书局). It was used for the Harvard-Yenching Sinological Index and later appeared, among others, in Zhonghua shuju (Beijing 1961). A facsimile edition of the Guyi congshu appeared in Taipei in 1965.

=== Xu Guyi congshu ===
[...]

=== Guyi congshu sanbian ===
[...]

== See also ==
- Yang Shoujing

== Bibliography ==
- Li Xueqin 李学勤, and Lü Wenyu 吕文郁 (eds.). Siku da cidian 四庫大辭典. 2 vols. Jilin daxue chubanshe, Changchun 1996 (vol. 2, p. 2096b)
- Chuban cidian 出版词典. Shanghai cishu chubanshe 上海辞书出版社 1992 (p. 955)
