= Jingzhuan Shici =

Chinese classic text

The Book of Expletives
- Author: Wang Yinzhi
- Original title: 經傳釋詞
- Language: Chinese
- Publication date: 1798
- Publication place: China
- Pages: 10

The Book of Expletives (Chinese: 經傳釋詞; pinyin: Jingzhuan Shici) written by Wang Yinzhi (Chinese: 王引之; pinyin: Wáng Yǐnzhī) is a book in ten volumes that analyzes the function of words in classical Chinese texts.

== Background ==
Modern Chinese and Classical Chinese are distinctly different. Even though some of the writing may be the same, grammar, sentence structure and meanings of words in their cultural context changed over time and may make Chinese classics difficult if not impossible to understand. The Book of Expletives serves as an interpretation of classical Chinese texts in modern terms.
