= Fan Shengzhi shu =

1st century BCE agricultural text

- Traditional Chinese: 氾勝之書
- Simplified Chinese: 氾胜之书
Transcriptions
Standard Mandarin
- Hanyu Pinyin: Fàn Shèngzhī shū
- Wade–Giles: Fan^{4} Shêng^{4}-chih^{1} shu^{1}

Fan Shengzhi shu (氾勝之書 "Fan Shengzhi's book" or "Fan Shengzhi's manual") was a Chinese agricultural text from the Han dynasty, written by Fan Shengzhi in the first century BC. The book was lost in the 11th- or 12th-century during the Song dynasty, possibly during the Jurchen invasion. Several fragments of the text have survived as quotations in other books including Qimin Yaoshu, Beitang Shuchao, Yiwen Leiju, and Taiping Yulan.

== Author ==
Fan Shengzhi was a Han dynasty official, possibly from Shandong, who served in the Guanzhong region first as court gentleman for consultation (議郎), then as agricultural development commissioner (勸農使) and commissioner of charioteers (輕車使者). The highest office he attained was that of censor-in-chief (御史).

== Text ==
The text provides advice on various agricultural topics which modern science views as within the discipline of agricultural meteorology.

The book was lost in the 11th- or 12th-century Song dynasty, possibly during the Jurchen invasion. Several fragments of the text have survived as quotations in other books including Qimin Yaoshu, Beitang Shuchao, Yiwen Leiju, and Taiping Yulan.

As part of efforts to mobilize traditional Chinese agricultural knowledge and combine it with modern specialist expertise, the Science Press published a modern interpretation of the text in 1956.

== Table of contents ==
1. "Ploughing" (耕田)
2. "Harvesting" (收種)
3. "Irrigation" (溲種法)
4. "Field usage" (區田法)
5. "Grain" (禾)
6. "Millet" (黍)
7. "Wheat" (麥)
8. "Rice" (稻)
9. "Barnyard grass" (稗)
10. "Large beans" (大豆)
11. "Small beans" (小豆)
12. "Nettle-hemp" (枲)
13. "Hemp" (麻)
14. "Melons" (瓜)
15. "Gourds" (瓠)
16. "Taros" (芋)
17. "Mulberries" (桑)
18. "Miscellaneous" (雜項)
