= Phoenix Publishing House =

Chinese publishing company

Phoenix Publishing House (Chinese: 凤凰出版社) is a publishing house in Nanjing in the Chinese province of Jiangsu. It was founded in March 1984 as Jiangsu Ancient Books Publishing House (Chinese: 江苏古籍出版社) and was renamed in October 2002 to Phoenix Publishing House. It mainly publishes ancient Chinese literature that cover history and philosophy.
