= Qimin Yaoshu =

Ancient Chinese reference work on agriculture and cooking

- Traditional Chinese: 《齊民要術》
- Simplified Chinese: 《齐民要术》
- Literal meaning: Essential Techniques for the Welfare of the People
Transcriptions
Standard Mandarin
- Hanyu Pinyin: 《Qímín yàoshù》
- Wade–Giles: Ch‘i-min Yao-shu

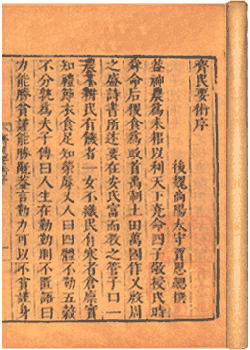
A Ming dynasty printed edition

The Qimin Yaoshu (Chinese: 齊民要術), translated as the "Essential Techniques for the Welfare of the People", is the most completely preserved of the ancient Chinese agricultural texts. It was written by the Northern Wei Dynasty official Jia Sixie (賈思勰), a native of Shouguang, Shandong province, which is a major agricultural producing region. The book is believed to have been completed in the second year of Wu Ding of Eastern Wei, 544 CE, while another account gives the completion between 533 and 544 CE.

The text of the book is divided into ten volumes and 92 chapters, and records 1500-year-old Chinese agronomy, horticulture, afforestation, sericulture, animal husbandry, veterinary medicine, breeding, brewing, cooking, storage, as well as remedies for barren land. The book quoted nearly 200 ancient sources including the Yiwu Zhi. Important agricultural books such as Fàn Shèngzhī shū (氾勝之書) and Sì mín yuè lìng (四民月令) from the Han and Jin Dynasties respectively are now lost, so future generations can only understand the operation of agriculture at the time from this book.

280 recipes are found in the text.

Since the publication of the book, historical Chinese governments have long attached great importance to it. Since the book spread overseas it has also often been considered a classic text to study changes in species. When Charles Darwin was researching the theory of evolution he made reference, in his book On The Origin of Species, to an "Encyclopedia of Ancient China". The book he referenced was in fact Qímín yàoshù. The book's name "Qímín yàoshù" can be explained as "techniques by which common people make their livelihood", but can also be explained as "techniques to harness the people's livelihood".
