= Zhang Hu =

Zhang Hu may refer to:

- Zhang Hu (張虎), son of the Wei general Zhang Liao in the Three Kingdoms period
- Zhang Hu (poet), a Tang dynasty poet, see Three Hundred Tang Poems
