= Wang Xianqian =

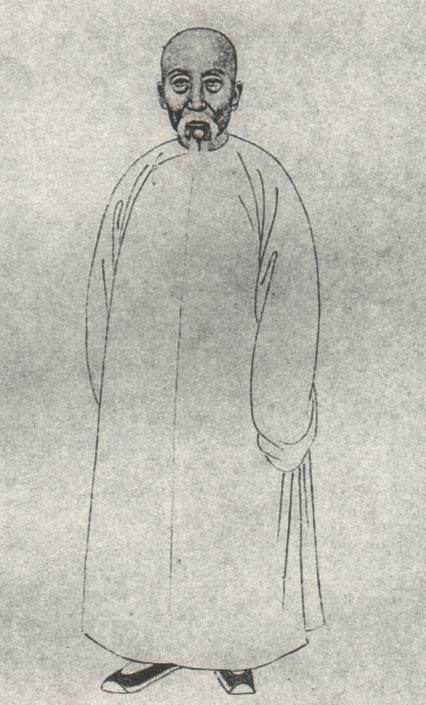
Wang Xianqian (from Qingdai xuezhe xiangzhuan)

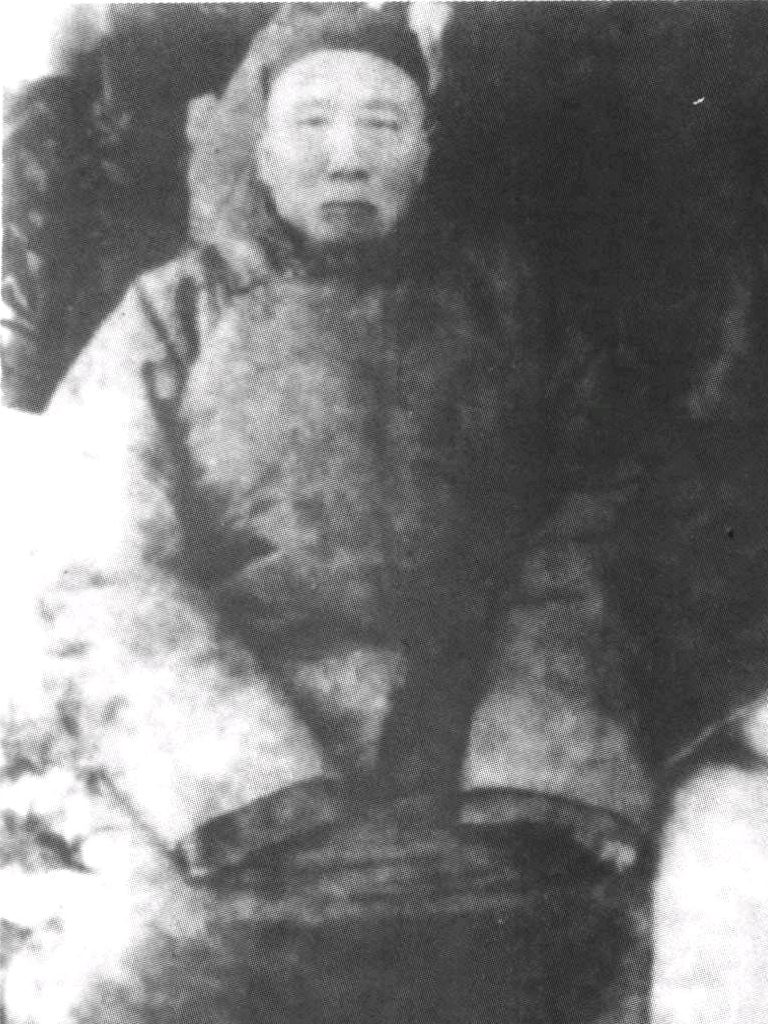
Wang Xianqian

Wang Xianqian (simplified Chinese: 王先谦; traditional Chinese: 王先謙; Wade–Giles: Wang Hsien-ch'ien; 1842–1918), courtesy names Yuwu (益吾) and Kuiyuan (葵園), was a versatile Confucian scholar and philologist of the late Qing dynasty.

== Life ==
Wang Xianqian was a native of Changsha, Hunan. A member of the prestigious Hanlin Academy, he was well versed in the Confucian Classics as well as classical prose and poetry. He taught at the Yuelu Academy—where he also served as director—and at the Chengnan Academy (Chengnan shuyuan 城南书院), both located in Changsha.

Among his major works is his continuation of the Huang Qing jingjie 皇清经解, known as Xu Huang Qing jingjie 续皇清经解 or Huang Qing jingjie xubian 皇清经解续编. Comprising 1,430 juan, it contains 209 treatises on the Confucian Classics written during the Jiaqing and Guangxu reigns and first published at the Nanjing Academy (Nanjing shuyuan 南菁书院) in Jiangyin. He also compiled the Xu gu wen ci lei zuan 续古文辞类纂. Wang authored a wide range of works esteemed among Chinese scholars, including the Collected Commentaries on the Xunzi (Xunzi jijie 荀子集解), the Zhuangzi (Zhuangzi jijie 庄子集解), and his supplemental commentary on the Book of Han (Hanshu buzhu 汉书补注), among others.

While in Jiangyin, he also published works such as Nanjing shuyuan congshu 南菁书院丛书, Qingjia ji 清嘉集, and Jiangzuo zhiyi jicun 江左制义辑存, the latter referring to writings from the Jiangzuo 江左 region, i.e., Jiangsu or the lower Yangtze area.

During the Hundred Days' Reform in 1898, Wang opposed the radical ideas promoted by Kang Youwei and Liang Qichao. Nevertheless, he advocated the study of Western scientific knowledge. He was also involved in mining development and railway enterprises.

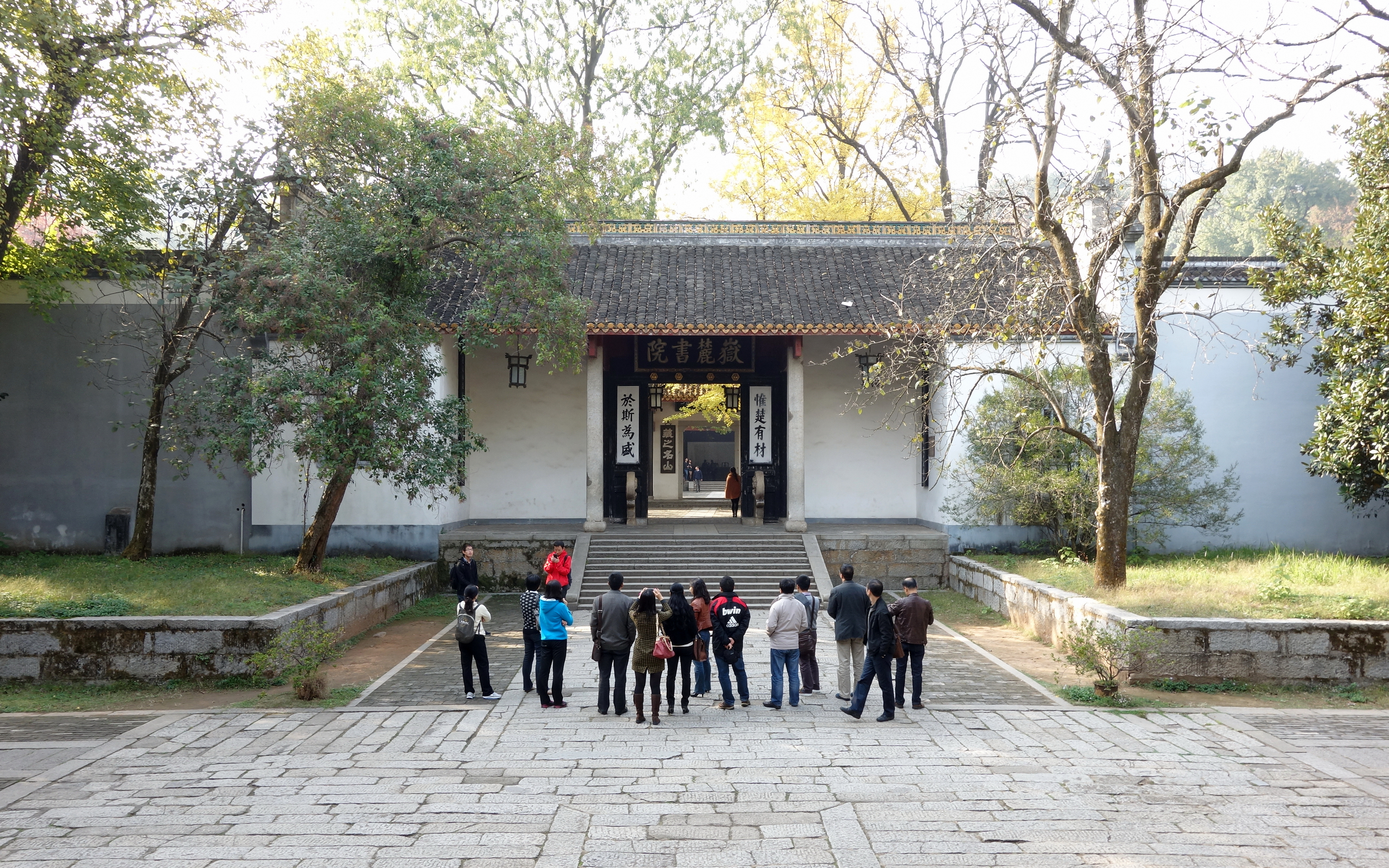
Yuelu Academy (Yuelu shuyuan)

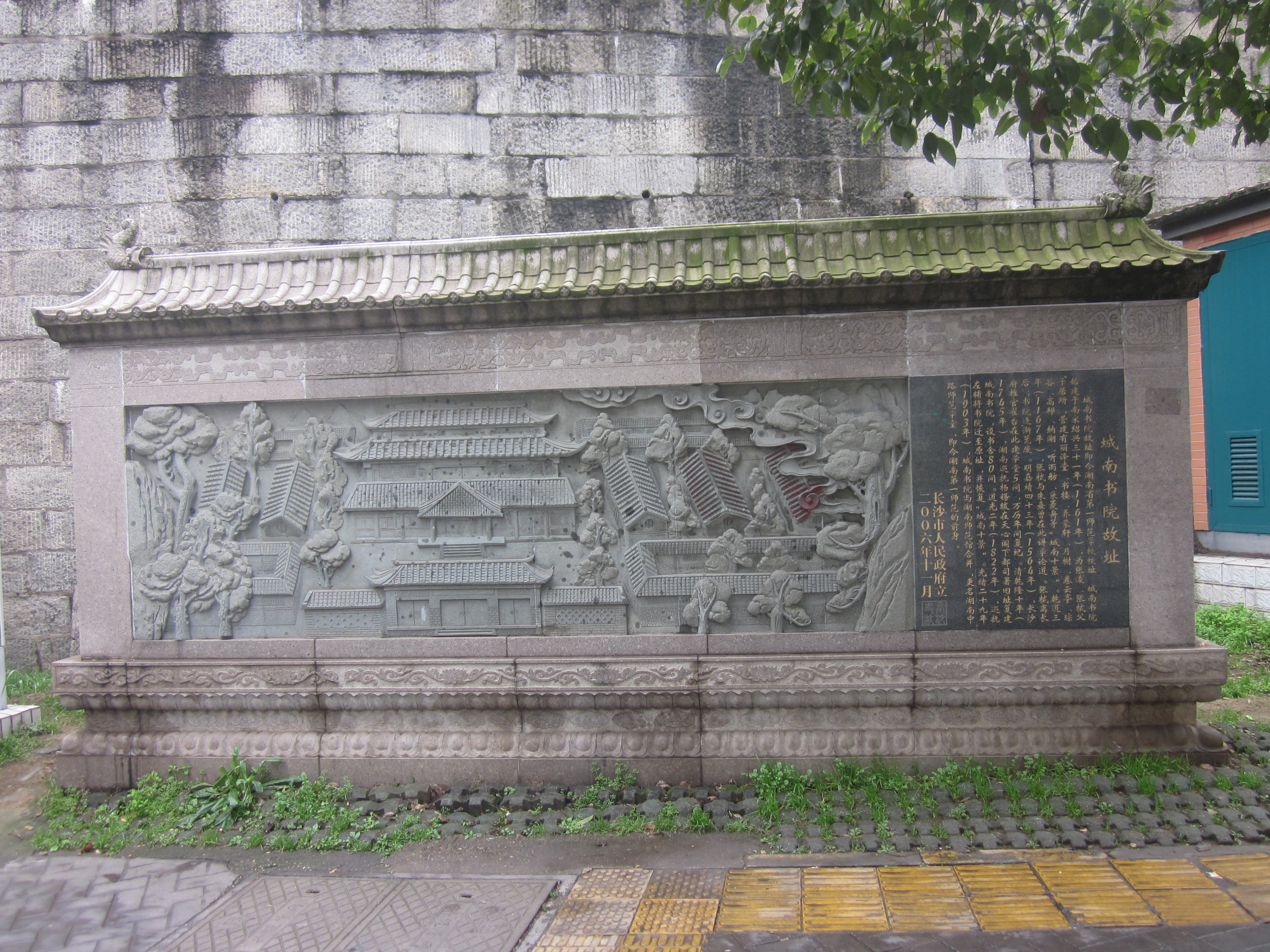
Site of the Chengnan Academy, Changsha

== Selected works ==
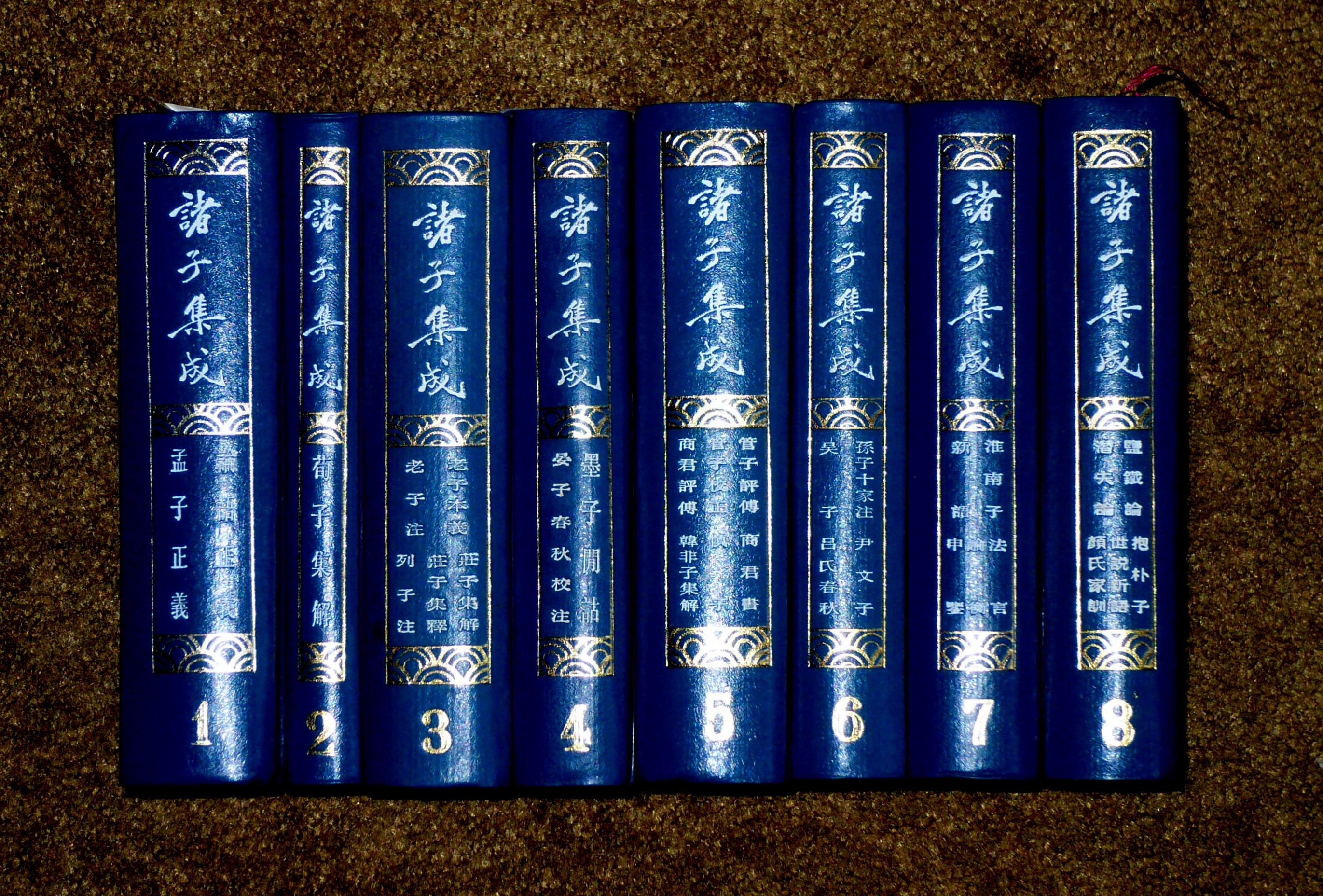
Zhuzi jicheng (eight-volume edition), volume 3: Zhuangzi jijie (8 juan) by (Qing) Wang Xianqian, and Zhuangzi jishi (10 juan) by (Qing) Guo Qingfan

For a detailed list, see „Wang Xianqians Schriften" (“Wang Xianqian’s writings") in Wang Weijiang's dissertation (pp. 235 ff.). His studies of early Chinese texts listed in the bibliography of the Hanyu da zidian (HYDZD) include studies to the following works:

- Maoshi 毛诗 / Shi 诗 (Shi sanjia yi jishu 诗三家义集疏; Zhonghua shuju 1987)
- Nanhua zhenjing 南华真经 / Zhuangzi 庄子 (Zhuangzi jijie 庄子集解; Zhuzi jicheng 诸子集成, Zhonghua shuju 1980 facsimile)
- Xunzi 荀子 (Xunzi jijie 荀子集解; Zhuzi jicheng 诸子集成, Zhonghua shuju 1974)
- Ban Gu 班固: Hanshu 汉书 (Hanshu buzhu 汉书补注; Xushoutang edition, facsimile Zhonghua shuju 1983)
- Liu Xi 刘熙: Shiming 释名 (Shiming shuzheng bu 释名疏证补; Shanghai guji 1984 facsimile)
- Fan Ye 范晔: Hou Hanshu 后汉书 (Hou Hanshu jijie 后汉书集解; Zhonghua shuju 1984 facsimile)
- Li Daoyuan 郦道元: Shuijing zhu 水经注 (Hejiao Shuijing zhu 合校水经注; Bashu shushe 1985 facsimile)
- Wei Shou 魏收: Weishu 魏书 (Weishu jiaokan ji 魏书校勘记; Guangya shuju congshu)

== See also ==
- Ruan Yuan
- Guo Qingfan
- Qingdai xuezhe xiangzhuan

== Bibliography ==
- Wang Weijiang: Wang Xianqian und die „Reine Strömung“: Politik und Gelehrsamkeit in der späten Qing-Zeit. Universität Hamburg, 2002. PDF
- 汉英中国哲学辞典. Kaifeng, 2002.
- Arthur W. Hummel (ed.). Eminent Chinese of the Ch'ing Period. Wang Xianqian is available for free viewing and download at the Internet Archive (ECCP)
- Gong Kangyun 龚抗云: Wang Xianqian de jingxue chengjiu yu jingxue sixiang 王先谦的经学成就与经学思想. Hunan University Press, 2013.
