= Jia Sixie =

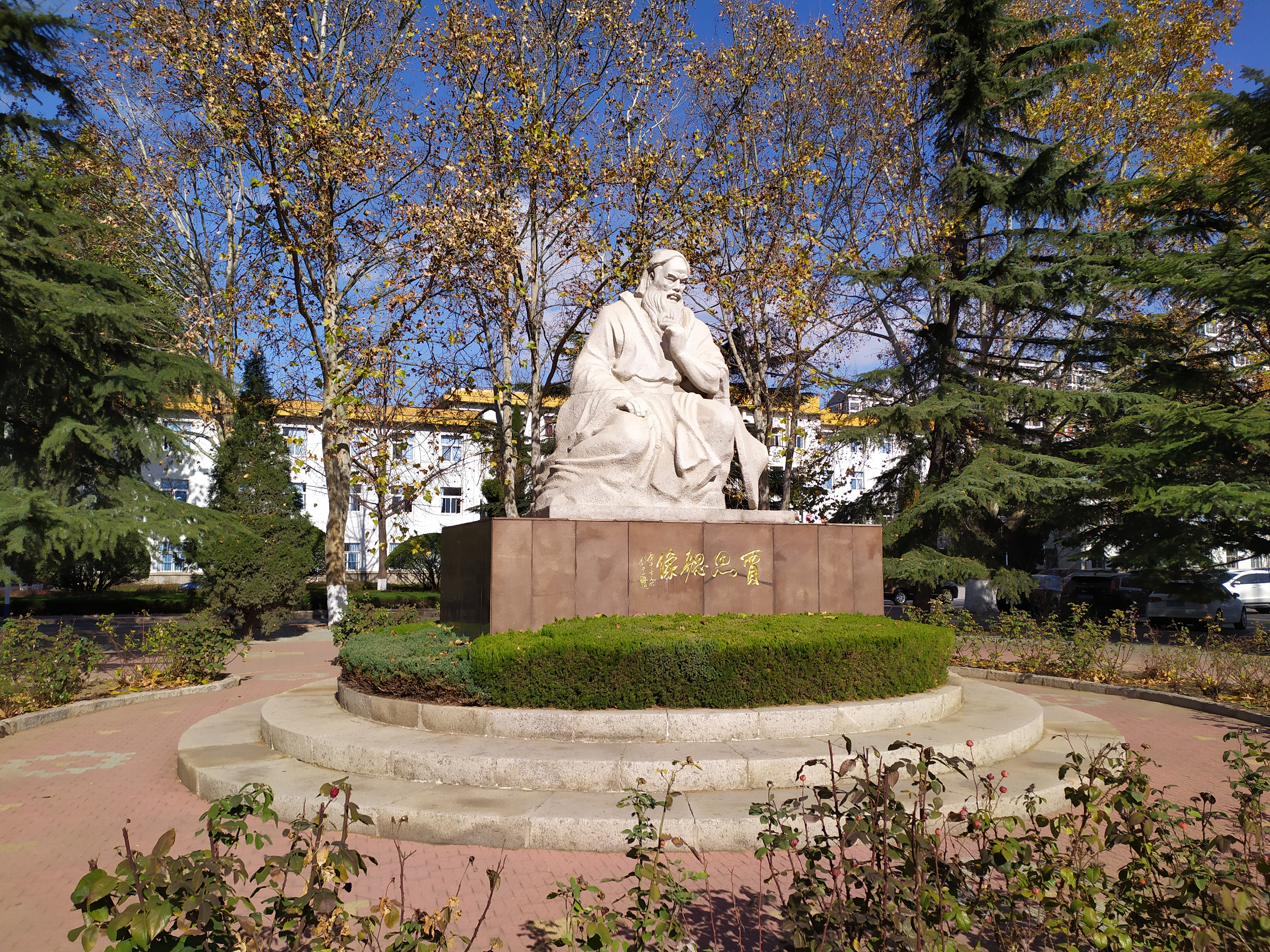
- Occupation: Agronomist
- Years active: 530–544
- Known for: Qimin Yaoshu

Jia Sixie (賈思勰) (fl. 530–544) was an agronomist during the Northern Wei Dynasty. He is the author of one of the earliest and historically most influential agricultural treatises, the Qimin Yaoshu 齊民要術 (often translated as “Essential Techniques for the Common People”). The text was notably one of the most systematically organized treatises on farming and animal husbandry, which was commonly copied and referred to by scholars from throughout the Tang dynasty until the Qing.

There are very little direct references of Jia in his agricultural treatise, as the only mention of him is a ten character long sentence that refers to him as the Governor of the prefecture of Gaoyang. There are still ongoing academic discussions surrounding where Jia was stationed as governor, as there were two Gaoyang prefectures located within the territory of Northern Wei; one in modern-day Hebei province, and one in Yidu district. Recent studies have also noted two figures from Yidu sharing Jia's family name who were listed in the Weishu as court officials, leading many scholars to generally agree that Jia was likely a member of the same family as the two mentioned officials, Jia Sibo (d. 525 CE) and Jia Sitong (d. 540 CE).
