= Liu Wendian =

Chinese educator (1889–1958)

Liu Wendian (simplified Chinese: 刘文典; traditional Chinese: 劉文典; pinyin: Liú Wéndiǎn; Wade–Giles: Liu Wen-tien; courtesy name: Shuya 叔雅; born December 1889; died 15 July 1958) was a Chinese philologist (guoxuejia) and educator.

== Life and work ==
Liu Wendian was born in Hefei, Anhui, with family origins from Huaining, Anhui. Like Liu Shipei and Zhang Taiyan, he followed Sun Yat-sen and participated in the Second Revolution. On Chen Duxiu's recommendation, he became a professor of Chinese culture at Peking University in 1917. In 1927, he led the founding of Anhui University. Later, he taught at Tsinghua University, the National Southwestern Associated University, and Yunnan University. After the Liberation, he became a national-level professor and a member of the National Committee of the Chinese People's Political Consultative Conference.

Liu Wendian made significant contributions to the study of several early Chinese texts, especially the Zhuangzi and the Huainanzi (by Liu An 刘安). His Zhuangzi buzheng 庄子补正 / 莊子補正, for example, served as the basis for Burton Watson's translation (The Complete Works of Chuang Tzu, New York and London, 1968).

During his presidency at Anhui University, he once referred to Chiang Kai-shek as a "new warlord" (新军阀).

== Selected publications ==
- Zhuangzi buzheng 庄子补正 (Yunnan Renmin Chubanshe, 1980 / first edition: Shanghai, Shangwu Yinshuguan 1947) - Online
- Huainan honglie jijie 淮南鸿烈集解 (Wanyou wenku)
- Sanyu zhaji 三余札记
- Liu Wendian quanji 劉文典全集 (Complete Works)
- Liu Wendian quanji bubian 劉文典全集補編 (Complete Works, Supplement)
