= Xue Xuan =

Chinese philosopher (1389–1464)

- 薛瑄
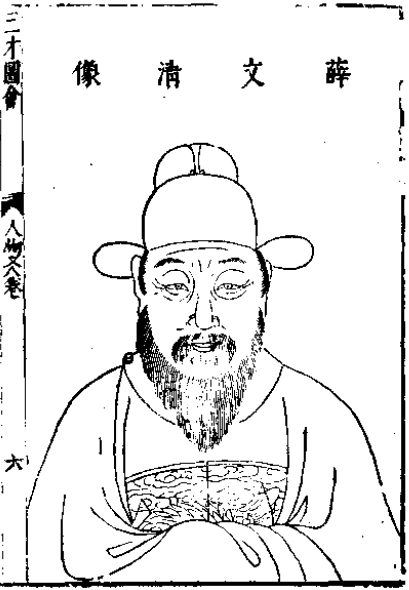
- Portrait of Xue Xuan as depicted in the Sancai Tuhui
- Born: 1389; Hejin, Shanxi
- Died: 1464 (aged 74–75)
- Education: jinshi degree (1421)

Chinese name
- Chinese: 薛瑄
Transcriptions
Standard Mandarin
- Hanyu Pinyin: Xuē Xuān

Xue Xuan (Note: Xue Xuan used the courtesy name Dewen (德溫) and the art name Jingxuan (敬軒).) (1389–1464) was a Chinese scholar-official and Neo-Confucian philosopher during the Ming dynasty.

== Biography ==
Xue Xuan was born in 1389 in Hejin County, present-day part of Yuncheng in Shanxi Province. He passed the civil service examinations and was awarded the rank of jinshi in 1421. He then began a career in the civil service. In the late 1430s, he compiled the study rules for the White Deer Grotto Academy, where he taught.

He was appointed investigating censor (jiancha yushi), assistant superintendent of education (tixue qianshi) in Shandong, and later minister of the Court of Judicial Review. In 1457, he rose to the position of right vice minister of rites and Hanlin academician (Hanlin xueshi), but resigned after a few months. After leaving office, he devoted himself to teaching. Xue was a follower of the teachings of Zhu Xi, which he further developed and expanded upon, eventually reaching the same level as Wang Yangming. He advocated for a return to nature (fuxing). In an effort to overcome a certain duality in Zhu's thinking, he redefined the relationship between principle (li) and energy (qi), while rejecting the idea of one being more important than the other. Some of his notable students included Yan Yuxi (閻禹錫, 1426–1476), Zhang Ding (張鼎, 1431–1495), Zhang Jie (張杰, 15th century), and Duan Jian (段堅, 1419–1487). Together with his disciples and followers, he formed the Hedong School of Neo-Confucianism.

He was given the posthumous name Wenqing (文清) as an official recognition of his contributions. In 1572, a memorial tablet bearing his name was placed in the Temple of Confucius.
