= Ma Yongqing =

Northern Song scholar

Ma Yongqing (simplified Chinese: 马永卿; traditional Chinese: 馬永卿; Wade–Giles: Ma Yung-ch'ing; courtesy name: Danian 大年) was a Chinese scholar in the Northern Song period from Yangzhou (in today's Jiangsu province) with a jinshi degree (1109).

He is known for his two books of the biji genre, with the titles Lanzhenzi 嫩真子 ("Records of the Lazy Perfect") and Yuancheng yulu 元城语录 ("Sayings of Master Yuancheng"), which is based on the thoughts and instructions of Liu Anshi 劉安世 (1048-1125).

Ma held the offices of vice magistrate of Jiangdu 江都, district magistrate of Xichuan 淅川 and Xiaxian 夏縣, and an unknown office in the region of Guanzhong 關中 (around today's Xi'an 西安, Shaanxi).

== Works ==
- Lanzhen zi 懒真子
- Yuancheng yulu 元城语录

== See also ==
- Quan Song biji 全宋筆記

== Bibliography ==
- Hanyu da zidian 汉语大字典, 1993 (one-volume edition)
