= Sun Yirang =

Philologist

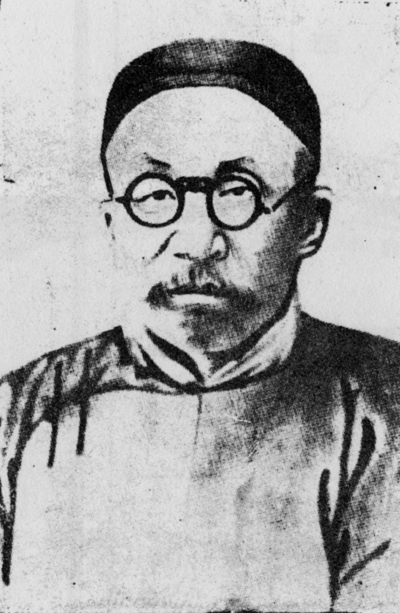

Sun Yirang (Chinese: 孫詒讓; pinyin: Sūn Yíràng; 1848–1908) was a Chinese philologist. A native of Wenzhou, Zhejiang province, he retired from official employment early in his life to devote himself to scholarship. His most important works are Mozi Jiangu (墨子間詁), a corrected, definitive edition of Mozi, and Zhouli Zhengyi (周禮正義), an important commentary on the Rites of Zhou. He also contributed to the studies of the bronzeware script and oracle bone script. His work Qiwen Juli (契文舉例), published posthumously by Luo Zhenyu, was the first work of decipherment of the oracle bone script.

== Bibliography ==
- Mozi jiangu 墨子間詁
- Zhouli zhengyi 周礼正義
- Guzhou shiyi 古籀拾遺
- Guzhou yulun 古籀余論
- Qiwen juli 契文挙例
- Mingyuan 名原
- Shangshu pianzhi 尚書駢枝
- Zhayi 札迻
- Zhouqing shulin 籀廎述林
