= Wang Yinzhi =

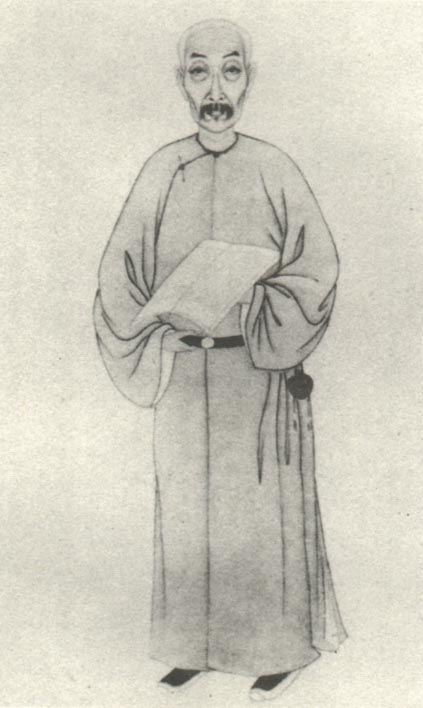
- Wang Yinzhi, in the Qingdai xuezhe xiangzhuan 清代学者象传
- Born: 1766; Gaoyou, Jiangsu
- Died: 1834 (aged 67–68)
- Occupation: Chinese scholar of the Qing dynasty

Wang Yinzhi (Chinese: 王引之; 1766–1834) was a Qing dynasty philologist. The son of Wang Niansun, he was the author of the Jingzhuan Shici.
