= Wang Niansun =

Chinese linguist (1744–1832)

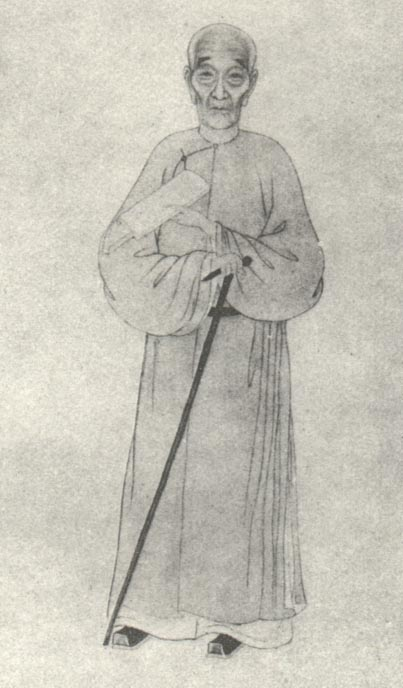
Wang Niansun

Wang Niansun (Chinese: 王念孫; 1744–1832), courtesy name: Huaizu (懷祖) was a Chinese scholar of the Qing Dynasty.

== Biography ==
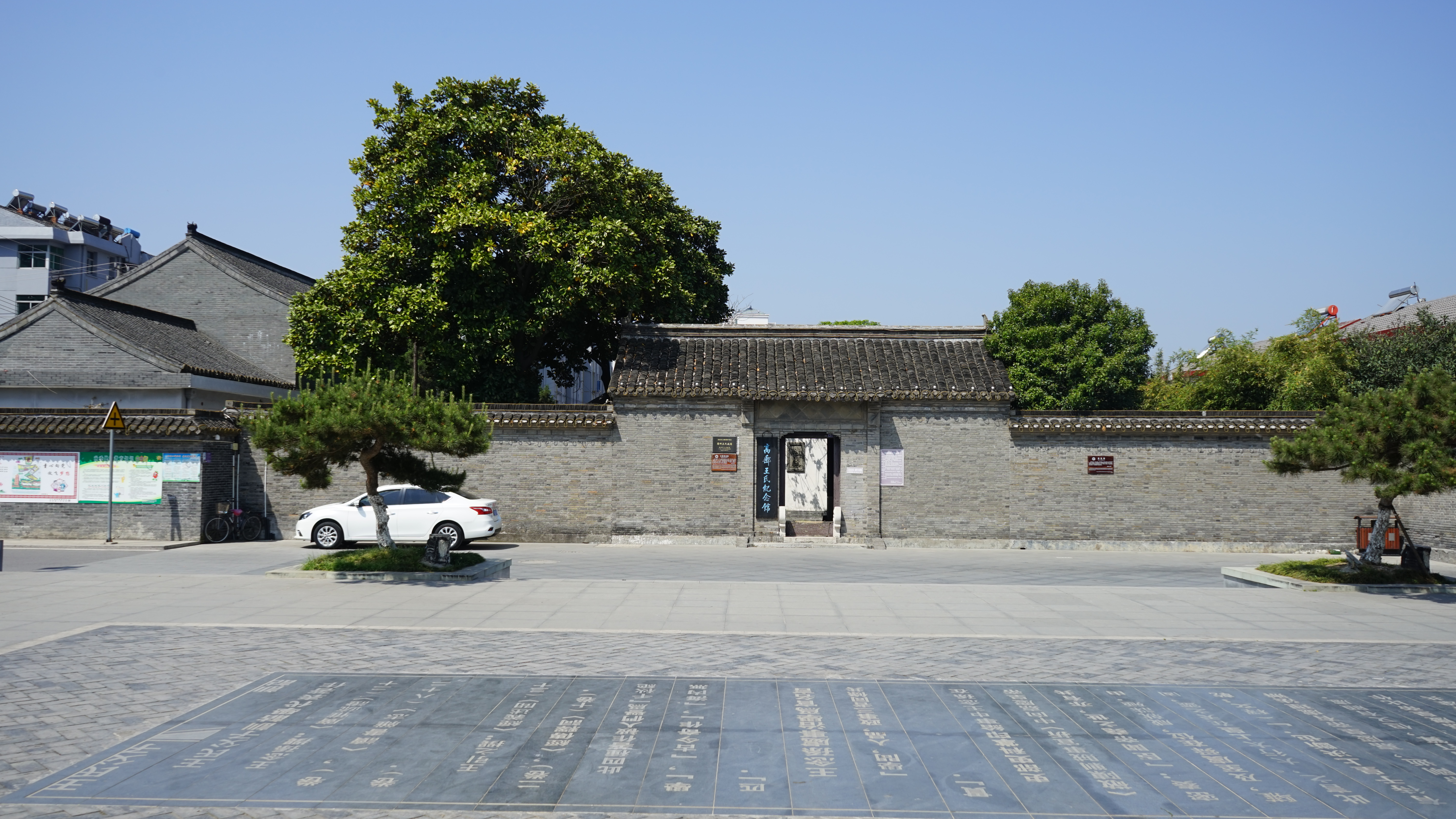
Former Residence of Wang Niansun and Wang Yinzhi in Gaoyou

A native of Gaoyou, Jiangsu, he worked as a government official specializing in channelization before retiring to devote himself to his studies. As an official, he is still remembered today for having the guts to impeach the corrupt high-ranked official Heshen.

A student of Dai Zhen, Wang is most famous for his commentary on the ancient thesaurus Guangya, Guangya shuzheng (廣雅疏證 "Guangya Annotations and Proofs"), which he spent a whole decade to complete. In his commentary he demonstrated his philological principle of "looking for the ancient meaning by considering the ancient sound ... not constrained by the structure of the character" (就古音以求古義......不限形體). Although he was not the first one to point out this principle, he was the first one to demonstrate it in an exemplary manner.

His Dushu zazhi (讀書雜誌 Miscellaneous Notes on the Classics) is also a philological treasure house, especially valuable for its textual criticism of ancient texts.

His son Wang Yinzhi (王引之) was also an important philologist. They are often referred together as "Father and Son Wang of Gaoyou" (高郵王氏父子).

== Works (in selection) ==
- Dushu zazhi 读书杂志 (Jiangsu guji chubanshe, 1985)
- Fangyan shuzheng bu 方言疏证补 (Gaoyou Wangshi yishu 高邮王氏遗书)
- Guangya shuzheng 广雅疏证 (Zhonghua shuju, 1983)
