= Lu Deming =

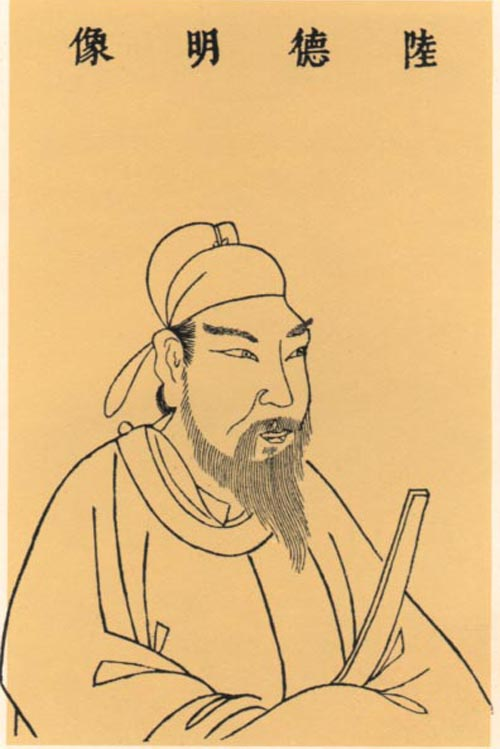
Lu Deming

Lu Deming (Chinese: 陸德明; 556(?)–630) was Tang dynasty Chinese scholar, author of the Jingdian Shiwen, which provides annotations on the classics, including alternate pronunciations of characters in specific contexts. In addition to authoring this work, Lu Deming opposed the xié yùn method of reading the Odes propounded by Shen Zhong. This method adjusted the pronunciation of characters to make them rhyme in contemporary speech. Lu Deming instead explained that rhyming practices were looser in earlier periods.

He was a proponent of the Wang Bi commentary on the Tao Te Ching, versus the more commonly excerpted Heshang Gong. He is the earliest preserved source to mention the Xiang'er commentary.

== Sources ==
- Wagner, Rudolf G. (2003). A Chinese Reading of the Daodejing: Wang Bi's Commentary on the Laozi with Critical Text and Translation. State University of New York Press. ISBN 978-0-7914-5181-6.
