= Yu Yue =

Chinese scholar and official (1821–1907)

Yu Yue 俞樾
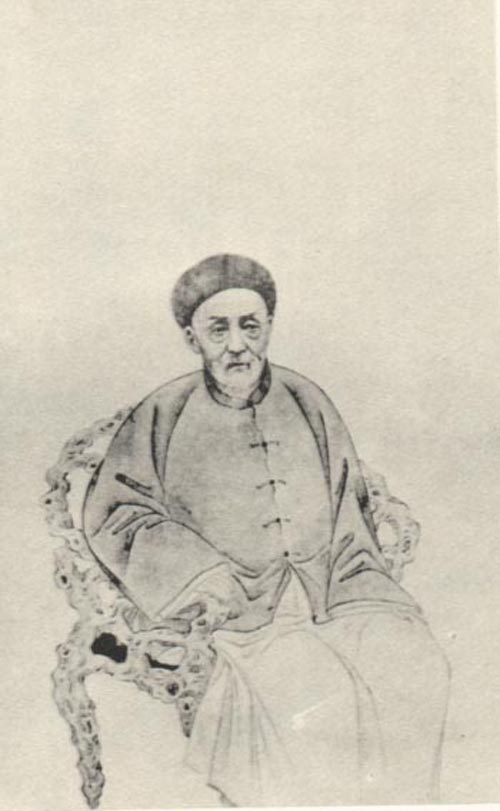
- Yu Yue in the Portraits of Chinese Scholars of the Qing Period
- Born: December 1821 (204 years ago)
- Died: 5 February 1907 (aged 85)
- Other names: courtesy: Yinfu (蔭甫); hao: Quyuan (曲園)

Academic background
- Influences: Gu Yanwu; Dai Zhen; Wang Niansun; Wang Yinzhi

Academic work
- Era: Qing dynasty
- Main interests: Philology, textual studies
- Notable works: List of Yu's works
- Notable ideas: Non-political environment; Research-based classics studies; Phonology and textual studies; more
- Influenced: Zhang Taiyan

Yu Yue
- Chinese: 俞樾
Transcriptions
Standard Mandarin
- Hanyu Pinyin: Yú Yuè
- Wade–Giles: Yü^{2} Yüeh^{4}
- IPA: [y̌ ɥê]

Yu Yue (Chinese: 俞樾; December 1821 – 5 February 1907), courtesy name Yinfu, hao Quyuan, was a prominent scholar and official of Qing dynasty. An expert in philology and textual studies, he taught and wrote prolifically on the classics and histories. Yu Pingbo was his great-grandson; one of his most important disciples was Zhang Taiyan.

== Scholarly career ==
Yu Yue hailed from Deqing, Zhejiang, and later moved to Renhe, now a subdistrict of Hangzhou.

In 1850, Yu passed the imperial examination as metropolitan graduate, and was appointed junior compiler in the Hanlin Academy. He then served successively in a variety of academic posts in the imperial bureaucracy, and was later promoted to educational instructor of Henan, not long before his resigning from this position and withdrawing to Suzhou, where he became a private teacher and devoted himself full-time to classical studies. From 1868 on, he was director of the Gujing Academy (詁經精舍), which he headed for more than 30 years. Yu's analyses of the classics are widely admired for their philological acumen, and he has had a large influence on both Chinese and foreign students of the Chinese classics, particularly in Japan.

== Notable thoughts ==
Yu's philosophy was inclined to the teachings of Wang Niansun and Wang Yinzhi, who interpreted Confucian classics in a practical way. In the 1860s, Yu was intimately involved in restoring the Gujing Academy, a sishu (private academy) established by Ruan Yuan in 1800 yet destroyed during the Taiping Rebellion. As opposed to the then dominant goal of education—namely education as pathway towards an official career—Yu aimed to provide a non-political environment for classics studies and stressed philology and historical research during his teaching, an intellectual tradition initiated by Gu Yanwu and Dai Zhen.

Yu allowed considerable freedom in readings of texts, which to a great extent stimulated Zhang Taiyan's creative thinking and developments to classical writings. He believed that the most important techniques in rendering the classics readable for contemporary readers were restoring original word and sentence orders (sometimes altered in transmission), establishing the proper senses of individual words, and most importantly being more aware of the use of phonetic loan words. Yu believed that many of the difficulties encountered in reading the classics were due to a failure to recognize the use of loan characters—an often quite challenging task, requiring an intimate knowledge of ancient Chinese phonology—and in his commentaries, he often raises the possibility of this phenomenon to suggest alternate readings. He memorably remarked that "holding a book transmitted and printed today and treating it as the true version of the ancients is like hearing people say that bamboo shoots are good to eat, and going home and cooking one's bed mat" (執今日傳刻之書, 而以爲是古人之眞本, 譬猶聞人言筍可食, 歸而煮其簀也).

Yu maintained links with both the traditional philological school and scholars of new thoughts—to name a few, Song Xiangfeng and Zhuang Cunyu from Changzhou, who explored political messages carried in classics including the Gongyang Commentary and the Spring and Autumn Annals. He also exchanged ideas with late-Qing reformers like Kang Youwei and Liang Qichao. Liang referred to Yu as one of the few orthodox scholars that survived the academic downfall during this period, yet Yu was actually not very much stuck into the so-called orthodox Confucianism: unlike Kang Youwei's speculative method in interpreting the Analects, Yu supported a more textual and factual approach; furthermore, instead of focusing merely on Confucian thoughts, Yu tended to put more emphasis on the Hundred Schools of Thought, which decentralised the Confucian hegemony in the pre-Qin period.

=== Games ===
Yu designed two board games, A Map for Splendid Journeys and A Map for Splendid Journeys on West Lake. In the preface to his collected works, Yu described his games as existing within the tradition of two dice games, Grid for Selection of Talent and Diagrams for Selection of Immortals. These dice games date back to the Tang dynasty or earlier. Yu first developed an interest in game design after his grandson-in-law gave him the game Seeing the Splendors, which is attributed to Gao Zhao of the early Qing period.

A Map for Splendid Journeys portrays six character archetypes on a quest for advancement across an empire-spanning landscape.

A Map for Splendid Journeys on West Lake portrays a circuit through a familiar tourist destination.

In 1892, Yu's board games (as well as his rules for a card game and a domino game) were published. All four of Yu's games were included in his 1899 complete works.

Near the end of his life, Yu regretted his game designs, concluding that they might encourage gambling, which he viewed as potentially destructive to young people.

== Major works ==
- Qunqing Pingyi (群經平議) — analysis and commentaries on Confucian classics, in which Yu followed the scholarly approach of Wang Yinzhi's work Jingyi Shuwen (經義述聞).
- Zhuzi Pingyi (諸子平議) — a collection of works of the pre-Qin masters and philosophers. It includes Yu's analysis and commentaries to the Daoist writings Baopuzi and Huainanzi, the legalist classics Hanfeizi and Gongsun Longzi, as well as to the histories Songshiyi (宋史翼) and Yizhoushu.
- Gushu Yiyi Juli (古書疑義舉例) — scholarly work on 88 systematic errors that were commonly seen in the interpretation of classical texts as a consequence of a different understanding of grammar or words. Point-by-point analyses to these errors were given by Yu. The book received great attention when it was published.
- The Seven Heroes and Five Gallants (Qixia Wuyi) — a high-class version of the popular romance Sanxia Wuyi, revised by Yu under the standards of written literature of his time. The revision was published in 1889.

Youtaixianguan Biji (右台仙館筆記) — an important Classical Chinese novel of the late-Qing period that very much reflected Yu's modernity consciousness.

- Chunzaitang Quanshu (春在堂全書), an eight-volume collection of Yu's works, which also compiled other notable publications of Yu, including:

Chaxiangshi Congchao (茶香室叢鈔) — scholarly notes
Chunzaitang Suibi (春在堂随笔) — essays
Liangzhe Fengyongji (兩浙風詠集), vol. 4 — artistic essays
Quyuan Zishu Shi (曲園自述詩) — poems
Yu Quyuan Suibi (俞曲園隨筆) — essays
Yu Yue Zhaji Wuzhong (俞樾箚記五種) — essays
