= Nüzi shijie =

Chinese women magazine (1904–1907)

- Categories: Women's magazines
- Frequency: Monthly
- Founded: 1904
- Final issue: 1907
- Country: China
- Based in: Shanghai
- Language: Chinese

Nüzi shijie (Chinese: 女子世界; lit. 'Women’s World') was a Chinese language women's magazine which was in circulation between 1904 and 1907 in Shanghai, China. It is one of the major women's magazines of the period 1904–1937.

== History and profile ==
Nüzi shijie was launched by the Women’s World Society of Changshu as a monthly publication in Shanghai in 1904. The founding editor was Ding Chuwo, a scholar and educator, who edited the magazine until 1907. The last issue of the magazine was edited by Chen Yiyi which appeared in 1907.

It had a wide distribution area, including Shanghai, Jiangsu, Zhejiang in addition to Jiangxi, Anhui, Hunan, Hubei, Sichuan, Shandong and Beijing. Target audience of Nüzi shijie was urban women readers. Major contributors were Gao Xie, Gao Xu and Liu Yazi, and some of the contributors were women. The magazine frequently featured articles about the women-related issues and gender relations in the Qing period. These articles were didactic in nature. It also published biographies of well-known historical Chinese women such as Shen Yunying and Qin Liangyu. The magazine argued that both women's education and the reinforcement of their rights were indispensable requirements for the survival of China.
