= Houtermans =

Houtermans may refer to

- Fritz Houtermans (1903–1966), Dutch-Austrian-German physicist
- Houtermans (crater), lunar crater
- Houtermans Award, award of the European Association of Geochemistry
