= Hu Huaichen =

Chinese poet and scholar (1886–1938)

Hu Huaichen (simplified Chinese: 胡怀琛; traditional Chinese: 胡懷琛; pinyin: Hú Huáichēn; Wade–Giles: Hu Huai-ch'en; 1886–1938), zi: Jichen 寄尘, was a Chinese poet and scholar of classical literature from the late Qing/Republic period.

== Life and work ==
Hu Huaichen came from Jing County in Anhui Province and wrote under several pseudonyms.

As his elder brother, the nationalistic philologist and poet Hu Pu’an 胡朴安 / 胡樸安 (1878–1947), Hu Huaichen was a member of a major anti-Qing organisation, the classical-style literary association Nanshe 南社 (Southern Society, 1909–1923). In a letter to Zheng Zhenduo (1898–1958) in September 1922, he criticized the New Literature Movement, saying: “Those who advocate new literature intend to reform Chinese literature; but in recent years, not only has it had no effect, but in some ways it has even been counterproductive.”

Hu Huaichen ist the author of the Dushu zaji 读书杂记 (“Miscellaneous Reading Notes“), contained in the Puxuezhai congshu 朴学斋丛书. Besides this work, the Hanyu da zidian (HYDZD) is using his Laozi buzhu 老子补注, Zhuangzi jijie buzheng 庄子集解补正 (1 juan, with additions and corrections to existing Zhuangzi commentaries), the Huainanzi jijie buzheng 淮南子集解补正, which are all contained in the collection Puxuezhai congshu 朴学斋丛书. His Liezi Zhang Zhan zhu buzheng 列子张湛注补正 (Annotations and Emendations on the Liezi Commentary by Zhang Zhan) was published in the magazine Dalu zazhi 大陆杂志 (2 juan, 8 qi 期 1934) .

In 1928, Hu Huaichen published a book entitled Jianyi zishuo 簡易字說 ("Explanation to simplified characters"), which involved three hundred simplified characters.

Hu Huaichen also expressed his views on matters related to translation work.

His poetical works were published by the Commercial Press in Shanghai under the title Hu Huaichen shige conggao 胡懷琛詩歌叢搞 (with the English sub-title: “Poetical Works of H. C. Hu”) in the year 1926.

== Bibliography ==
- Hanyu da zidian. 1993 (one-volume edition)
