= Kao Ping-tse =

Chinese astronomer

- 高平子
- Born: 23 December 1888; Shanghai
- Died: 23 March 1970 (aged 81); Taipei, Taiwan
- Occupation: Astronomer

Kao Ping-tse (Chinese: 高平子; pinyin: Gāo Píngzǐ; 23 December 1888 – 23 March 1970) was a Chinese astronomer. He was entirely self-taught in this field. The crater Kao on the Moon is named in his honor.

Kao was born in Shanghai. His father was a revolutionary, a Jǔrén 舉人, and a key figure of the Nan Society (South Society, 南社) in the late Qing Dynasty. He worked at Qingdao Observatory, received from the Japanese after the Washington Naval Conference in 1924. He then worked at the Academia Sinica Institute of Astronomy & Astrophysics, one of the founders of Purple Mountain Observatory.

During World War II, he lived in Shanghai. He moved to Taiwan in 1948, during the Chinese Civil War. He died in Taipei.

He is a relative of Charles K. Kao, Kao Hsieh, and Gao Xu.
