= Houtermans (crater) =

Crater on the Moon

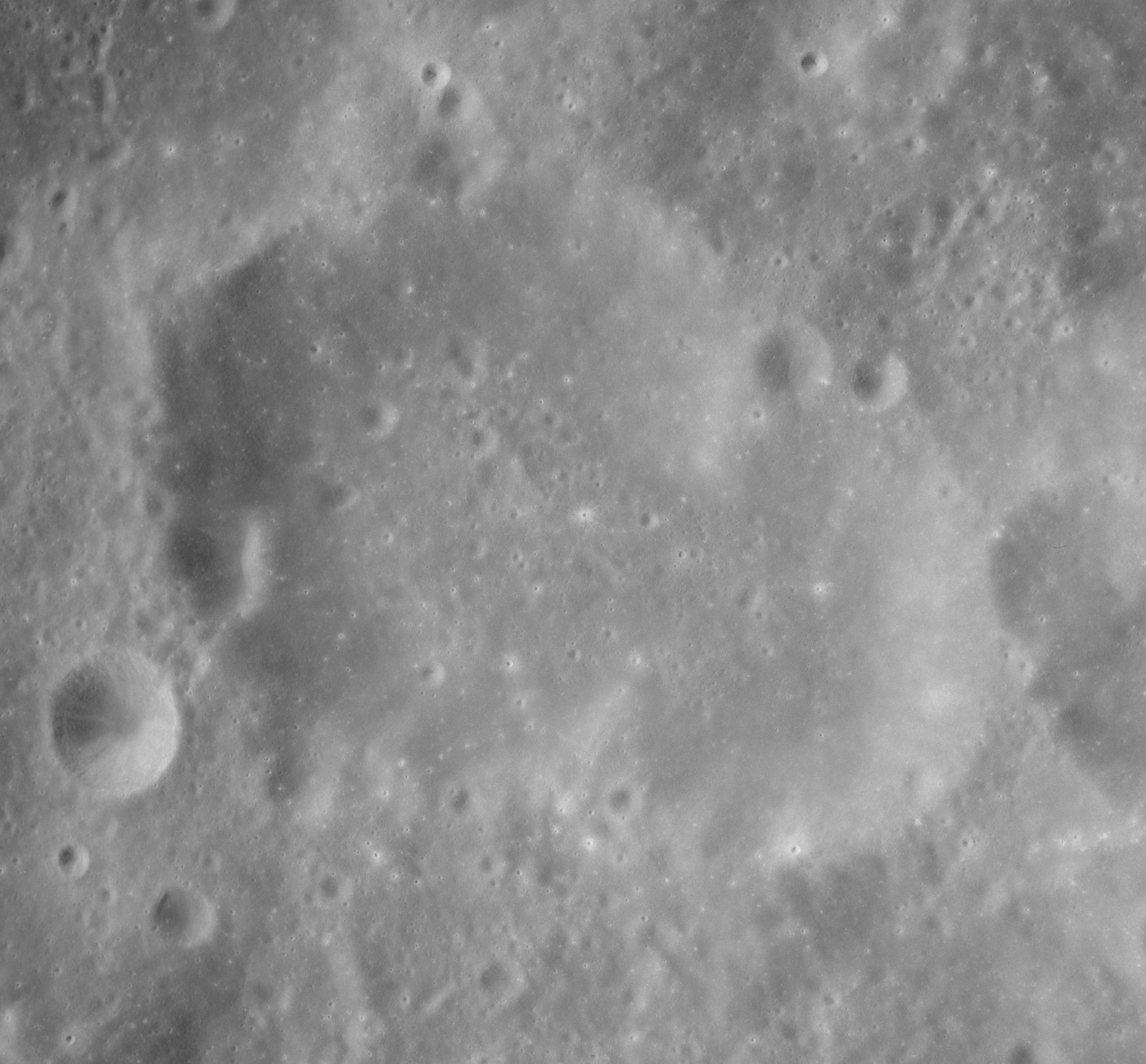
- Apollo 12 image
- Coordinates: 9.4°S 87.2°E
- Diameter: 29 km
- Depth: Unknown
- Colongitude: 273° at sunrise
- Eponym: Friedrich G. Houtermans

Houtermans is a lunar impact crater that is located beside the eastern limb of the Moon, in the region of the surface where visibility is affected by libration. It lies to the east of the crater Kreiken, and south of the crater pairing of Helmert and Kao.

This is an elongated formation created by two or more merged crater formations. The crater formation is twice as wide in longitude as it is in latitude, with the long axis oriented toward the west-northwest. The rim is worn and eroded, with a tiny crater along the northernmost part of the rim, and an inward bulge along the northern half of the inner rim about 60% of the distance from west to east. The interior floor is relatively featureless, with only a few tiny craterlets.
