= Gao Xie =

Chinese artist and poet (1877–1958)

- Chinese: 高燮; pinyin: Gāo Xiè
- Born: 1877; Zhangyan, Jinshan, Jiangsu, China
- Died: 1958 (aged 80–81)
- Other names: Chuiwan Chinese: 吹萬 (courtesy name), Hanyin (寒隱), Laorang (老攘), Huangtian (黃天), Baoweng (葩翁), Cishi (慈石), Shiruo (時若).
- Occupations: Chinese Scholar, Chinese calligraphy Artist, Chinese Painter, Poet, Writer
- Relatives: Charles K. Kao (Grandson)

Chinese name
- Traditional Chinese: 高燮
- Simplified Chinese: 高燮
Transcriptions
Standard Mandarin
- Hanyu Pinyin: Gāo Xiè
- Wade–Giles: Kao Hsieh

Gao Xie (Chinese: 高燮; pinyin: Gāo Xiè; Wade–Giles: Kao Hsieh; 1877–1958), was a Chinese scholar, calligraphist, traditional painter, publisher, poet, writer, and book collector.

== Biography ==
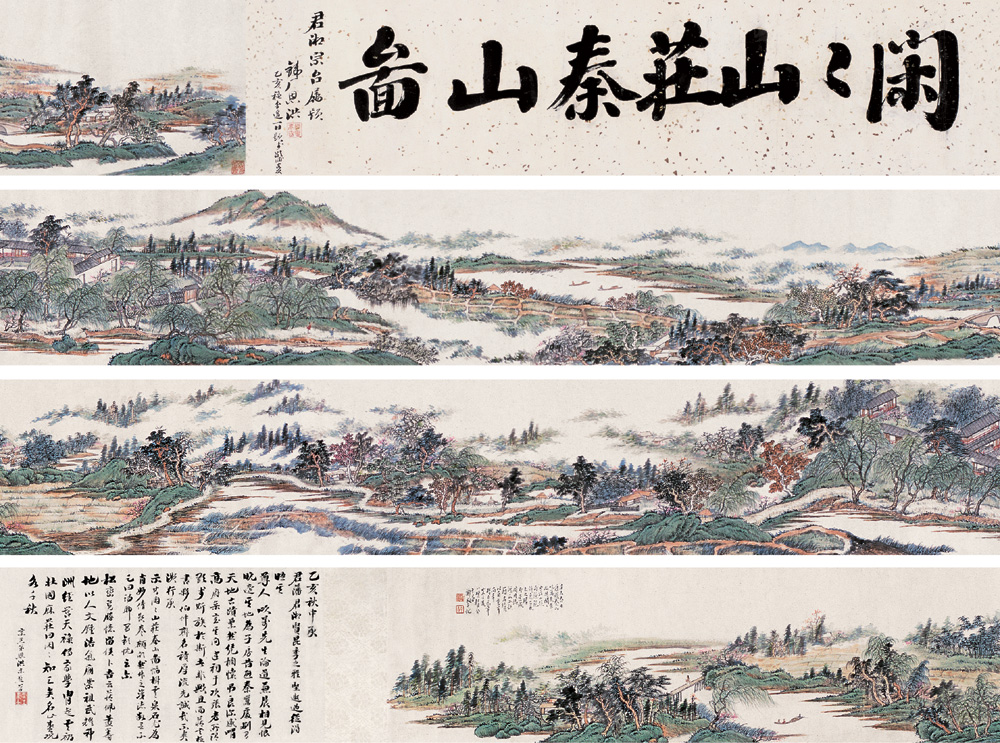
A landscape painting of XianXian ShanZhuang (Gao's villa) and the Qianshan Hill, by painter Zheng Wuchang (鄭午昌) in 1931. Gao's villa was very famous during that time.

Gao was born in Zhangyan (張堰), Jinshan, Jiangsu (now Jinshan District, Shanghai), to a wealthy family. He studied law in Shanghai.

Gao owned a villa near Qinshan Hill (秦山) in Jinshan, named Xianxian Shanzhuang (閑閑山莊), and Huang Binhong painted a Shan-Shui (landscape painting) for it. The villa was destroyed during the Second Sino-Japanese War when the Japanese army invaded Shanghai. Gao also had his own family press, library and a book-collecting chamber named Chuiwan Chamber (吹萬樓) which stored more than 100,000 volumes. In his late years, Gao donated all his book collections to the Fudan University Library in Shanghai. His rare collections included more than one thousand versions of Shi Jing from different periods in Chinese history, which was the largest at that time.

Gao's courtesy name is Chuiwan (吹萬, Pinyin: Chuīwàn, Wade–Giles: Ch'ui-wan). He also used many art-names (hào) and pen names in his work including Hanyin (寒隱), Laorang (老攘), Huangtian (黃天), Baoweng (葩翁), Cishi (慈石), Shiruo (時若).

Gao was a leading figure of the South Society which was the largest literature and poetry organization during the late Qing dynasty and the early period of the Republic of China (ROC). Many of Gao's family members were involved in the founding and development of the society. Gao's relative Gao Xu was one of the three co-founders of the society. Gao's nephew Yao Guang (姚光) and son Gao Junxiang (高君湘) were also active members of the society.

Gao's grandson Charles K. Kao was awarded the 2009 Nobel Prize in Physics for his groundbreaking achievements concerning fiber-optic communication. Gao's brother's son Ping-Tse Kao was also a physicist, and the Kao Crater on the Moon is named after him.

== Art ==
Gao was an accomplished artist and were especially good at calligraphy and Bird-and-flower painting. In 1990s and 2000s, Gao's calligraphies and paintings has been shown in various antique auctions in Shanghai, Beijing, Hangzhou, and Hong Kong and gained popularity.

== Selected publications ==
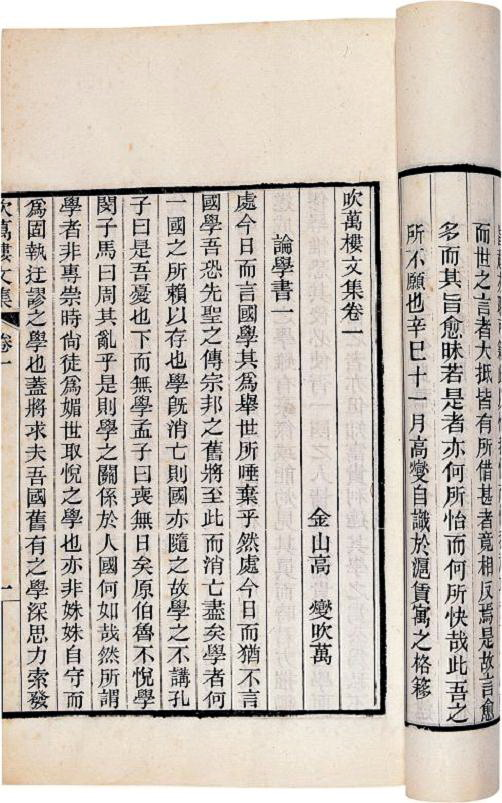
The first volume of the Literal Collection of Chuiwan Chamber (《吹萬樓文集》), by Gao Xie, and was published by his family press in 1941.

- Collection of Gao Xie (高燮集); Renmin University Press, 1999-08-01; ISBN 7-300-02942-6.
- Literal Collection of the Chuiwan Chamber (Chui wan lou wen ji, "吹萬樓文集"), published in 1941 by Gao Chuiwan's family press, now an antique collection of the National Library of Australia.
- A rearranged version and collection of Juemin Magazine, by Gao Xie, Gao Xu, and Gao Zeng (高增); republished by the Social Sciences Academic Press, Beijing, 1991; collection of the National Library of Australia.

== See also ==
- South Society, the largest literature society during the late Qing and early ROC periods.
- Gao Xu, Gao Xie's relative and one of the three founders of South Society.
- Charles K. Kao, Gao's grandson and the Nobel Prize Laureate in Physics in 2009.
- Ping-Tse Kao, Gao's brother's son, pioneer of modern Chinese astronomy.
