= Charles K. Kao =

Hong Kong electrical engineer (1933–2018)

Sir Charles K. Kao GBM KBE FRS FREng
- 高錕
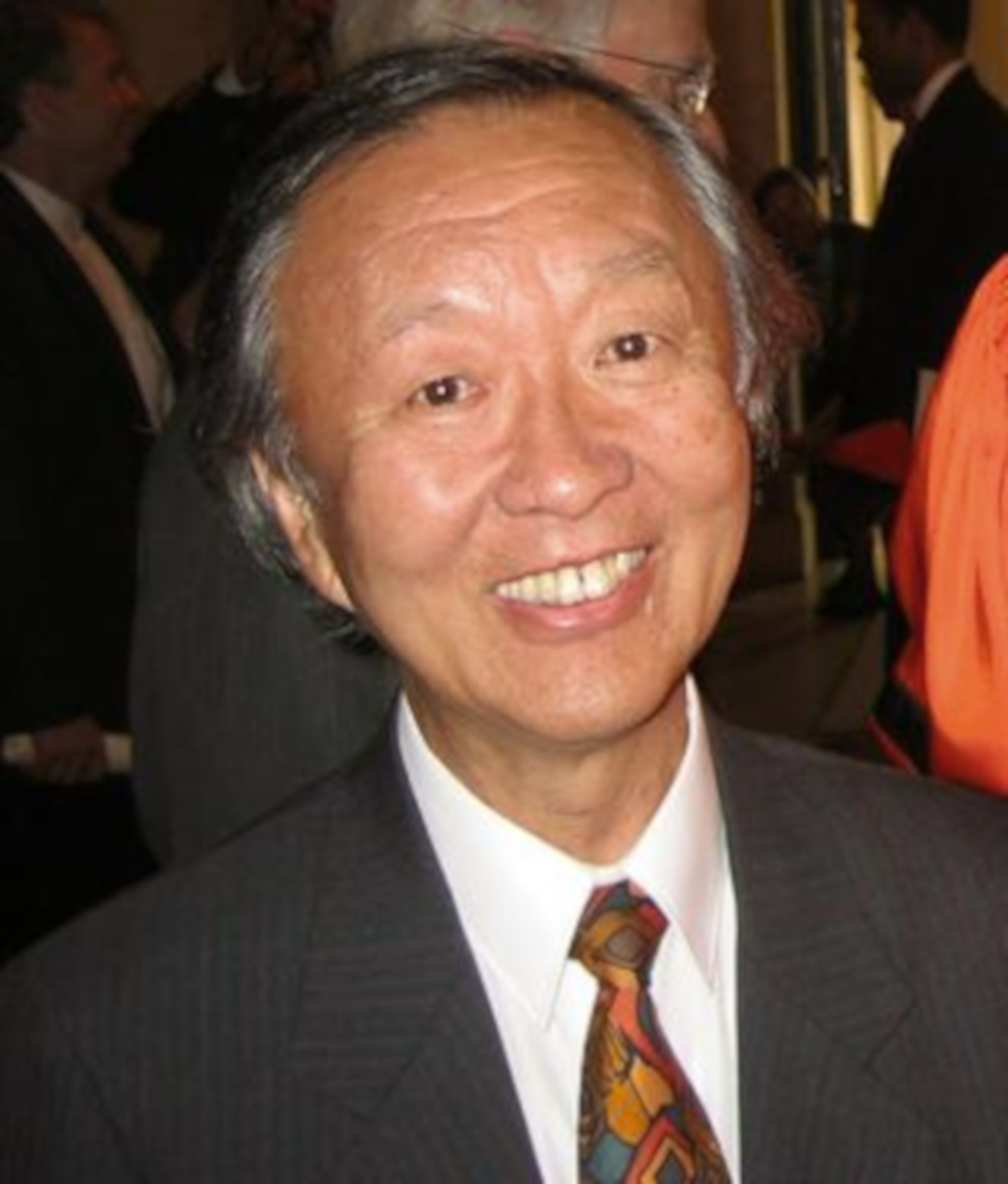
- Kao in 2004
- Born: Kao Kuen; November 4, 1933; Shanghai, China
- Died: September 23, 2018 (aged 84); Sha Tin, Hong Kong
- Citizenship: United Kingdom; United States
- Education: Woolwich Polytechnic (BSc); University of London (PhD)
- Known for: Fibre optics; Fibre-optic communication
- Spouse: Gwen Wong May-Wun (m. 1959)
- Children: 2
- Relatives: Kao Hsieh (grandfather); Kao Ping-tse (first cousin, once removed)
- Awards: Stuart Ballantine Medal (1977); Rank Prize for Optoelectronics (1978); IEEE Morris N. Liebmann Memorial Award (1978); Marconi Prize (1985); IEEE Alexander Graham Bell Medal (1985); C&C Prize (1987); Faraday Medal (1989); International Prize for New Materials (1989); SPIE Gold Medal (1992); Prince Philip Medal (1996); Japan Prize (1996); Charles Stark Draper Prize (1999); Nobel Prize in Physics (2009); Grand Bauhinia Medal (2010)
- Scientific career
- Fields: Electrical engineering
- Workplaces: Standard Telephones and Cables; Chinese University of Hong Kong; ITT Corporation
- Thesis: Waveguides for millimetric and submillimetric electromagnetic waves (1965)
- Doctoral advisor: Harold Barlow

Sir Charles Kuen Kao (Note: simplified Chinese: 高锟; traditional Chinese: 高錕; pinyin: Gāo Kūn) (November 4, 1933 – September 23, 2018) was a Hong Kong electrical engineer who contributed to the development and use of fibre optics in telecommunications. In the 1960s, Kao created various methods to combine glass fibres with lasers in order to transmit digital data, which laid the groundwork for the evolution of the Internet and the eventual creation of the World Wide Web.

Born in 1933 in Shanghai, Kao and his family settled in Hong Kong in 1949. He graduated from St. Joseph's College in Hong Kong in 1952 and went to London to study electrical engineering. In the 1960s, he worked at Standard Telecommunication Laboratories, the research center of Standard Telephones and Cables (STC) in Harlow, and it was here in 1966 that he laid the groundwork for fibre optics in communication. Known as the "godfather of broadband," the "father of fibre optics," and the "father of fibre optic communications," he continued his work in Hong Kong at the Chinese University of Hong Kong, and in the United States at ITT (the parent corporation of STC) and Yale University.

In 2009, Kao was awarded the Nobel Prize in Physics "for groundbreaking achievements concerning the transmission of light in fibres for optical communication." The following year, he was knighted by Queen Elizabeth II "for services to fibre-optic communications."

Kao was a permanent resident of Hong Kong, and was a citizen of both the United Kingdom and the United States.

== Early life and education ==
Kao Kuen was born on November 4, 1933, in Shanghai, China, and lived with his parents in the Shanghai French Concession. He studied Chinese classics at home with his brother, under a tutor. He also studied English and French at the Shanghai World School (上海世界學校) that was founded by a number of progressive Chinese educators, including Cai Yuanpei.

After the Communist Revolution in 1949, Kao's family settled in Hong Kong, which at the time was a British crown colony. Much of his mother's siblings moved to Hong Kong in the late 1930s. Among them, his mother's youngest brother took good care of him.

Kao's family lived on Lau Sin Street at the edge of the North Point, a neighbourhood of Shanghai immigrants. During Kao's time in Hong Kong, he studied at St. Joseph's College for five years and graduated in 1952.

Kao obtained high score in the Hong Kong School Certificate Examination, which at the time was the territory's matriculation examination, qualifying him for admission to the University of Hong Kong (HKU). However, electrical engineering wasn't a programme available at HKU, the territory's then only tertiary education institution.

Hence, in 1953, Kao went to London to continue his studies in secondary school, and obtained his A-Level in 1955. He was then admitted to Woolwich Polytechnic (now the University of Greenwich), where he graduated with a Bachelor of Science in Electrical Engineering in 1957. While working at Standard Telephones and Cables in Harlow, Kao pursued a Doctor of Philosophy (PhD) at University College London, supervised by Professor Harold Barlow of the Department of Electrical Engineering. In 1965, he submitted his PhD thesis titled Waveguides for millimetric and submillimetric electromagnetic waves.

=== Ancestry and family ===
Kao's father Kao Chun-Hsiang (高君湘), originally from Jinshan City (now a district of Shanghai City), obtained his Juris Doctor from the University of Michigan Law School in 1925. He was a judge at the Shanghai Concession and later a professor at Soochow University (then in Shanghai) Comparative Law School of China.

His grandfather Kao Hsieh was a scholar, poet, and artist. Several writers including Kao Hsü, Yao Kuang (姚光), and Kao Tseng (高增) were also Kao's close relatives.

His father's cousin was astronomer Kao Ping-tse (Kao crater is named after him). Kao's younger brother Timothy Wu Kao (高鋙) is a civil engineer and professor emeritus at the Catholic University of America; his research is in hydrodynamics.

Kao met his future wife Gwen May-Wan Kao (née Wong; 黃美芸) in London after graduation, when they worked together as engineers at STC. She was British Chinese. They were married in 1959 in London, and had a son and a daughter, both of whom reside and work in Silicon Valley, California. According to Kao's autobiography, Kao was a Catholic who attended Catholic Church, while his wife attended the Anglican Communion.

== Career and research ==
=== Fibre optics and communications ===
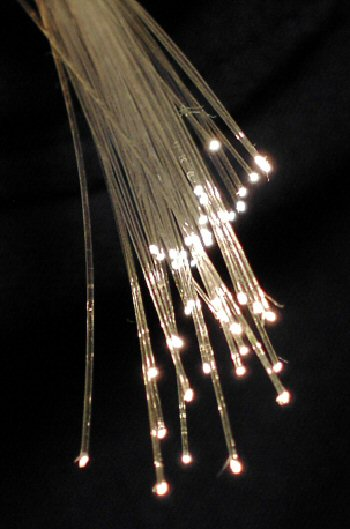
A bundle of silica glass fibres for optical communication, which are the de facto worldwide standard. Kao also first publicly suggested that silica glass of high purity is an ideal material for long range optical communication.

In the 1960s at Standard Telecommunication Laboratories (STL) based in Harlow, Essex, England, Kao and his coworkers did their pioneering work in creating fibre optics as a telecommunications medium, by demonstrating that the high-loss of existing fibre optics arose from impurities in the glass, rather than from an underlying problem with the technology itself.

In 1963, when Kao first joined the optical communications research team he made notes summarising the background situation and available technology at the time, and identifying the key individuals involved. Initially Kao worked in the team of Antoni E. Karbowiak (Toni Karbowiak), who was working under Alec Reeves to study optical waveguides for communications. Kao's task was to investigate fibre attenuation, for which he collected samples from different fibre manufacturers and also investigated the properties of bulk glasses carefully. Kao's study primarily convinced him that the impurities in material caused the high light losses of those fibres. Later that year, Kao was appointed head of the electro-optics research group at STL. He took over the optical communication program of STL in December 1964, because his supervisor, Karbowiak, left to take the chair in Communications in the School of Electrical Engineering at the University of New South Wales (UNSW), Sydney, Australia.

Although Kao succeeded Karbowiak as manager of optical communications research, he immediately decided to abandon Karbowiak's plan (thin-film waveguide) and overall change research direction with his colleague George Hockham. They not only considered optical physics but also the material properties. The results were first presented by Kao to the IEE in January 1966 in London, and further published in July with George Hockham (1964–1965 worked with Kao). (Note: Kao's major task was to investigate light-loss properties in materials of optic fibers, and determine whether they could be removed or not. Hockham's was investigating light-loss due to discontinuities and curvature of fiber.) This study proposed the use of glass fibres for optical communication. The concepts described, especially the electromagnetic theory and performance parameters, are the basis of today's optical fibre communications.

"What Kao did in Harlow transformed the world and provided a backbone for the internet. He was the father of fiber optics."

— Harlow Museum's David Devine on Kao's pioneering work in fiber optics at STC's Standard Telecommunication Laboratories in Harlow

In 1965, (Note: Some sources show around 1964, for example, "By 1964, a critical and theoretical specification was identified by Dr. Charles K. Kao for long-range communication devices, the 10 or 20 dB of light loss per kilometer standard." from Cisco Press.) Kao with Hockham concluded that the fundamental limitation for glass light attenuation is below 20 dB/km (decibels per kilometer, is a measure of the attenuation of a signal over a distance), which is a key threshold value for optical communications. However, at the time of this determination, optical fibres commonly exhibited light loss as high as 1,000 dB/km and even more. This conclusion opened the intense race to find low-loss materials and suitable fibres for reaching such criteria.

Kao, together with his new team (members including T. W. Davies, M. W. Jones and C. R. Wright), pursued this goal by testing various materials. They precisely measured the attenuation of light with different wavelengths in glasses and other materials. During this period, Kao pointed out that the high purity of fused silica (SiO_{2}) made it an ideal candidate for optical communication. Kao also stated that the impurity of glass material is the main cause for the dramatic decay of light transmission inside glass fibre, rather than fundamental physical effects such as scattering as many physicists thought at that time, and such impurity could be removed. This led to a worldwide study and production of high-purity glass fibres. When Kao first proposed that such glass fibre could be used for long-distance information transfer and could replace copper wires which were used for telecommunication during that era, his ideas were widely disbelieved; later people realized that Kao's ideas revolutionized the whole communication technology and industry.

Kao also played a leading role in the early stage of engineering and commercial realization of optical communication. In spring 1966, Kao traveled to the U.S. but failed to interest Bell Labs, which was a competitor of STL in communication technology at that time. He subsequently traveled to Japan and gained support. Kao visited many glass and polymer factories, discussed with various people including engineers, scientists, businessmen about the techniques and improvement of glass fibre manufacture. In 1969, Kao with M. W. Jones measured the intrinsic loss of bulk-fused silica at 4 dB/km, which is the first evidence of ultra-transparent glass. Bell Labs started considering fibre optics seriously. As of 2017, fibre optic losses (from both bulk and intrinsic sources) are as low as 0.1419 dB/km at the 1.56 μm wavelength.

Kao developed important techniques and configurations for glass fibre waveguides, and contributed to the development of different fibre types and system devices which met both civil and military application requirements, and peripheral supporting systems for optical fibre communication. In mid-1970s, he did seminal work on glass fibre fatigue strength. When named the first ITT Executive Scientist, Kao launched the "Terabit Technology" program in addressing the high frequency limits of signal processing, so Kao is also known as the "father of the terabit technology concept". Kao has published more than 100 papers and was granted over 30 patents, including the water-resistant high-strength fibres (with M. S. Maklad).

At an early stage of developing optic fibres, Kao already strongly preferred single-mode for long-distance optical communication, instead of using multi-mode systems. His vision later was followed and now is applied almost exclusively. Kao was also a visionary of modern submarine communications cables and largely promoted this idea. He predicted in 1983 that world's seas would be littered with fibre optics, five years ahead of the time that such a trans-oceanic fibre-optic cable first became serviceable.

Ali Javan's introduction of a steady helium–neon laser and Kao's discovery of fibre light-loss properties now are recognized as the two essential milestones for the development of fibre-optic communications.

=== Later work ===
Kao joined the Chinese University of Hong Kong (CUHK) in 1970 to found the Department of Electronics, which later became the Department of Electronic Engineering. During this period, Kao was the reader and then the chair Professor of Electronics at CUHK; he built up both undergraduate and graduate study programs of electronics and oversaw the graduation of his first students. Under his leadership, the School of Education and other new research institutes were established. He returned to ITT Corporation in 1974 (the parent corporation of STC at that time) in the United States and worked in Roanoke, Virginia, first as Chief Scientist and later as Director of Engineering. In 1982, he became the first ITT Executive Scientist and was stationed mainly at the Advanced Technology Center in Connecticut. While there, he served as an adjunct professor and Fellow of Trumbull College at Yale University. In 1985, Kao spent one year in West Germany, at the SEL Research Center. In 1986, Kao was the Corporate Director of Research at ITT.

Kao was one of the earliest to study the environmental effects of land reclamation in Hong Kong, and presented one of his first related studies at the conference of the Association of Commonwealth Universities (ACU) in Edinburgh in 1972.

Kao was Vice-Chancellor of the Chinese University of Hong Kong from 1987 to 1996. From 1991, Kao was an Independent Non-Executive Director and a member of the Audit Committee of the Varitronix International Limited in Hong Kong. From 1993 to 1994, he was the President of the Association of Southeast Asian Institutions of Higher Learning (ASAIHL). In 1996, Kao donated to Yale University, and the Charles Kao Fund Research Grants was established to support Yale's studies, research and creative projects in Asia. The fund currently is managed by Yale University Councils on East Asian and Southeast Asian Studies. After his retirement from CUHK in 1996, Kao spent his six-month sabbatical leave at the Department of Electrical and Electronic Engineering of Imperial College London; from 1997 to 2002, he also served as visiting professor in the same department.

Kao was chairman and member of the Energy Advisory Committee (EAC) of Hong Kong for two years, and retired from the position on July 15, 2000. Kao was a member of the Council of Advisors on Innovation and Technology of Hong Kong, appointed on April 20, 2000. In 2000, Kao co-founded the Independent Schools Foundation Academy, which is located in Cyberport, Hong Kong. He was its founding chairman in 2000, and stepped down from the board of the ISF in December 2008. Kao was the keynote speaker at IEEE GLOBECOM 2002 in Taipei, Taiwan. In 2003, Kao was named a Chair Professor by special appointment at the Electronics Institute of the College of Electrical Engineering and Computer Science, National Taiwan University. Kao then worked as the chairman and CEO of Transtech Services Ltd., a telecommunication consultancy in Hong Kong. He was the founder, chairman and CEO of ITX Services Limited. From 2003 to January 30, 2009, Kao was an independent non-executive director and member of the audit committee of Next Media.

== Later life and death ==
Kao's international travels led him to opine that he belonged to the world instead of any country. An open letter published by Kao and his wife in 2010 later clarified that "Charles studied in Hong Kong for his high schooling, he has taught here, he was the Vice-Chancellor of CUHK and retired here too. So he is a Hong Kong belonger."

Pottery making was a hobby of Kao's. Kao also enjoyed reading Wuxia (Chinese martial fantasy) novels.

Kao suffered from Alzheimer's disease from early 2004 and had speech difficulty, but had no problem recognising people or addresses. His father suffered from the same disease. Beginning in 2008, he resided in Mountain View, California, United States, where he moved from Hong Kong in order to live near his children and grandchild.

On October 6, 2009, when Kao was awarded the Nobel Prize in Physics for his contributions to the study of the transmission of light in optical fibres and for fibre communication, he said, "I am absolutely speechless and never expected such an honor." Kao's wife Gwen told the press that the prize will primarily be used for Charles's medical expenses. In 2010 Charles and Gwen Kao founded the Charles K. Kao Foundation for Alzheimer's Disease to raise public awareness about the disease and provide support for the patients.

In 2016, Kao lost the ability to maintain his balance. At the end-stage of his dementia he was cared for by his wife and intended not to be kept alive with life support or have CPR performed on him. Kao died at Bradbury Hospice in Hong Kong on September 23, 2018, at the age of 84.

== Recognition ==
=== Awards ===
Year	Organisation	Award	Citation	Ref.
1977	Franklin Institute	Stuart Ballantine Medal	"[For] conceptual studies of lightguide communications using laser generated light waves guided in a hair-thin glass fiber for transmitting messages."	
1978	Institute of Electrical and Electronics Engineers	IEEE Morris N. Liebmann Memorial Award	"For making communication at optical frequencies practical by discovering, inventing and developing the materials, techniques and configurations for glass fiber waveguides."	
1978	Rank Foundation	Rank Prize for Optoelectronics	"For their [Kao and George Hockham] outstanding contribution to research into the properties of clad optical fibres and their subsequent successful development leading to the commercial production of such fibres which are playing an increasing role into the field of communications."	
1985	Marconi Society	Marconi Prize	"For being instrumental in contributing toward a revolution in communication techniques in the form of optical fiber technology."	
1985	Institute of Electrical and Electronics Engineers	IEEE Alexander Graham Bell Medal	"For pioneering contributions to optical fiber communications."	
1987	NEC C&C Foundation	C&C Prize	"For Pioneering Contributions to the Realization of Optical Fiber Communications as the First to point out Theoretically the Feasibility and Significance of Low-loss Glass Fiber."	
1989	Institution of Electrical Engineers	Faraday Medal	—	
1989	American Physical Society	International Prize for New Materials	"For their [Kao, John B. MacChesney, and Robert D. Maurer] contributions to the materials research and development that resulted in practical low loss optical fibers, one of the cornerstones of optical communications technology."	
1992	SPIE	SPIE Gold Medal	—	
1996	Japan Prize Foundation	Japan Prize	"For pioneering research on wideband, low-loss optical fiber communications."	
1996	Royal Academy of Engineering	Prince Philip Medal	—	
1999	National Academy of Engineering	Charles Stark Draper Prize	"For development of fiber-optic technology."	
2009	Royal Swedish Academy of Sciences	Nobel Prize in Physics	"For groundbreaking achievements concerning the transmission of light in fibers for optical communication."	

=== Memberships ===
Year	Organisation	Type	Ref.
1979	Institute of Electrical and Electronics Engineers	Life Fellow	
1989	Hong Kong Computer Society	Distinguished Fellow	
1989	Royal Academy of Engineering	Fellow	
1990	National Academy of Engineering	Member	
1992	Academia Sinica	Academician	
1994	Hong Kong Institution of Engineers	Honorary Fellow	
1994	Hong Kong Academy of Engineering Sciences	Honorary Fellow	
1997	Royal Society	Fellow	

=== Honorary degrees ===
Year	University	Degree	Ref.
1990	National Chiao Tung University	Doctor of Engineering	
1994	Durham University	Doctor of Science	
1998	University of Hull	Doctor of Science	
1999	Yale University	Doctor of Science	
2002	University of Greenwich	Doctor of Science	
2004	Princeton University	Doctor of Science	
2005	University of Toronto	Doctor of Laws	
2010	University College London	Doctor of Science	
2011	University of Hong Kong	Doctor of Science	

=== Honours ===
Year	Country	Honour	Ref.
1993	United Kingdom	Commander of the Order of the British Empire	
2010	United Kingdom	Knight Commander of the Order of the British Empire	
2010	Hong Kong	Grand Bauhinia Medal	

== Commemoration ==
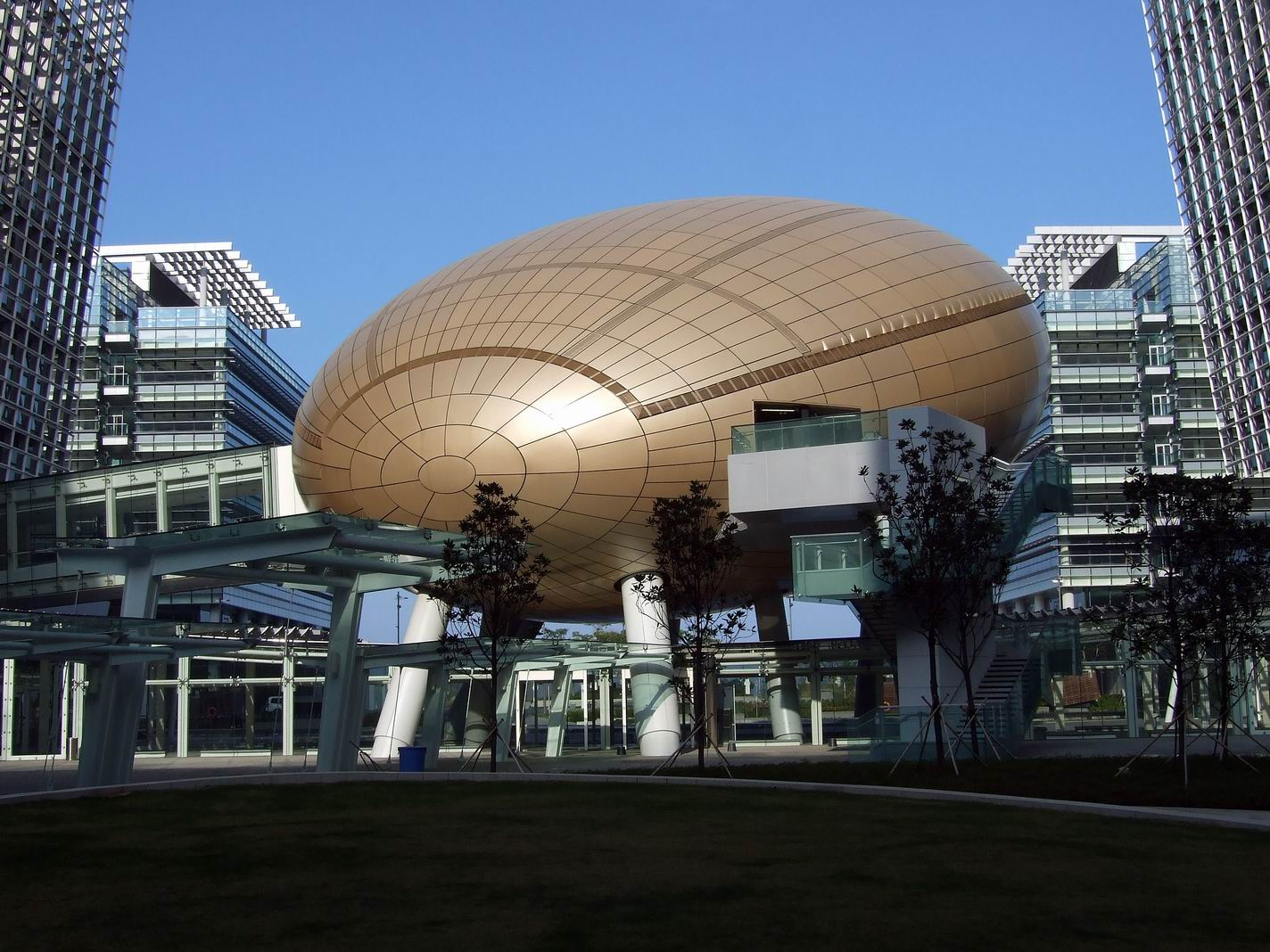
The landmark auditorium in the Hong Kong Science Park was named after Kao on December 30, 2009.

- The minor planet 3463 Kaokuen, discovered in 1981, was named after Kao in 1996.
- 1996 (November 7): The north wing of the Chinese University of Hong Kong Science Center was named the Charles Kuen Kao Building.
- 2009 (December 30): The landmark auditorium in the Hong Kong Science Park was named after Kao – the Charles K. Kao Auditorium.
- 2010 (March 18): Professor Charles Kao Square, a square of the Independent Schools Foundation Academy
- 2014 (September): Sir Charles Kao UTC (now known as BMAT STEM Academy) was opened.
- 2014: Kao Data, a data center operator based on the former site of Sir Charles Kao's work on fibre optics cables, was founded.

=== Others ===
- Featured in Science Museum London
- Hong Kong Affairs Adviser (May 1994 – June 30, 1997)
- Advisor of the Macao Science and Technology Council
- 1999: Asian of the Century, Science and Technology
- 2002: Leader of the Year – Innovation Technology Category, Sing Tao, Hong Kong
- October 21, 2002: Inducted into the Engineering Hall of Fame, the 50th Anniversary Issue, Electronic Design
- January 3, 2008: Inducted into the Celebration 60, British Council's 60th anniversary in Hong Kong
- November 4, 2009: Honorary citizenship, and the "Dr. Charles Kao Day" in Mountain View, California, U.S.
- 2009: Hong Kong's Person of the Year
- The Top 10 Asian Achievements of 2009 – No. 7
- 2010 (February): Honoree, Committee of 100, U.S.
- The 2010 OFC/NFOEC Conferences were dedicated to Kao, March 23–25, San Diego, California, U.S.
- May 14–15, 2010: Two sessions were dedicated to Kao at the 19th Annual Wireless and Optical Communications Conference (WOCC 2010), Shanghai, P.R. China.
- May 22, 2010: Inducted into the memento archive of the 2010 Shanghai World Expo
- Mid-2010: Hong Kong Definitive Stamp Sheetlet (No. 1), Hong Kong
- March 25, 2011: Blue plaque unveiled in Harlow, Essex, U.K.
- November 4, 2014: Gimme Fibre Day on Kao's birthday, FTTH Councils Global Alliance
- November 4, 2021, Google celebrated Kao's birthday with a Google Doodle. The binary output in the graphic spells out 'KAO' when converted to ASCII.

== Works ==
- Optical Fiber Technology; by Charles K. Kao. IEEE Press, New York, U.S.; 1981.
- Optical Fiber Technology, II; by Charles K. Kao. IEEE Press, New York, U.S.; 1981, 343 pages. ISBN 0-471-09169-3 ISBN 978-0-471-09169-1.
- Optical Fiber Systems: Technology, Design, and Applications; by Charles K. Kao. McGraw-Hill, U.S.; 1982; 204 pages. ISBN 0-07-033277-0 ISBN 978-0-07-033277-5.
- Optical Fibre (IEE materials & devices series, Volume 6); by Charles K. Kao. Palgrave Macmillan on behalf of IEEE; 1988; University of Michigan; 158 pages. ISBN 0-86341-125-8 ISBN 978-0-86341-125-0
- A Choice Fulfilled: the Business of High Technology; by Charles K. Kao. The Chinese University Press/ Palgrave Macmillan; 1991, 203 pages. ISBN 962-201-521-2 ISBN 978-962-201-521-0
- Tackling the Millennium Bug Together: Public Conferences; by Charles K. Kao. Central Policy Unit, Hong Kong; 48 pages, 1998.
- Technology Road Maps for Hong Kong: a Preliminary Study; by Charles K. Kao. Office of Industrial and Business Development, The Chinese University of Hong Kong; 126 pages, 1990.
- Nonlinear Photonics: Nonlinearities in Optics, Optoelectronics and fibre Communications; by Yili Guo, Kin S. Chiang, E. Herbert Li, and Charles K. Kao. The Chinese University Press, Hong Kong; 2002, 600 pages.

== Notes ==
Awards and achievements
Preceded by Andrew Viterbi	IEEE Alexander Graham Bell Medal; 1985	Succeeded by Bernard Widrow
Preceded by Nick Holonyak	Japan Prize; 1996	Succeeded by Takashi Sugimura and Bruce N. Ames
Preceded by Yoichiro Nambu, Makoto Kobayashi, and Toshihide Maskawa	Nobel Prize Laureate in Physics with Willard Boyle and George E. Smith; 2009	Succeeded by Andre Geim and Konstantin Novoselov
Academic offices
Preceded by Ma Lin	Vice-Chancellor of the Chinese University of Hong Kong; 1987–1996	Succeeded by Arthur Li
