= Hong Kong Academy of Engineering Sciences =

Hong Kong Academy of Engineering
- Formation: 1994; 32 years ago
- Founder: Sir Sze-yuen Chung
- Type: Professional association
- Legal status: Registered Charity
- Headquarters: HKSTP, Shatin
- Location: Hong Kong
- President: Ir Prof. Jin-Guang Teng
- Website: http://hkaes.org

The Hong Kong Academy of Engineering (HKAE), formerly Hong Kong Academy of Engineering Sciences, is an engineering science institution based in Hong Kong. It aims on encouraging and maintaining distinction in the field of engineering with useful resolution, and to promote the development of the science, art and practice of engineering for the social well-being.

== History ==
The Academy was established on 13 September 1994, by Sir S.Y. Chung, Prof. Yau-Kai Cheung, Sir Charles K. Kao and other engineering scholars in Hong Kong.
