= Gao Xu =

- Traditional Chinese: 高旭
- Simplified Chinese: 高 旭
Transcriptions
Standard Mandarin
- Hanyu Pinyin: Gāo Xù
- Wade–Giles: Kao Hsü / Kao Hsu

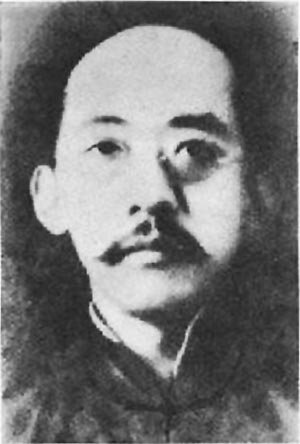
Gao Xu

Gao Xu (Chinese: 高旭; pinyin: Gāo Xù; Wade–Giles: Kao Hsü/Kao Hsu; 1877－1925), was a Chinese poet, writer, revolutionary, political activist. Gao is one of the three founders of the South Society which was the largest organization of literature and poetry during the late Qing dynasty China and the early period of the Republic of China. Gao is also one of the founding members of Tongmenghui led by Sun Yat-sen.

== Biography ==
Born in Zhangyan Village (張堰鎮), Jinshan, Jiangsu Province (currently Jinshan District, Shanghai) to a local prominent family, Gao's courtesy name (zì) was Tainmei (天梅). He also used some other courtesy names like Huiyun (慧雲) and Dunjian (鈍劍), and was called Jiangong (劍公) by his close friends. In modern literature, Gao was commonly recorded as Gao Tianmei (高天梅, Pinyin: Gāo Tiān Méi, Wade–Giles: Kao T`ien-Mei / Kao Tien-Mei).

Beginning in 1898, Gao had been heavily influenced by the philosophies of Liang Qichao and Kang Youwei. Gao rendered his full support to Hundred Days' Reform by writing and publishing articles in various magazines. He co-founded the Juemin Society (覺民社), an influential revolutionary and literature organization, together with his uncle Gao Xie (高燮) and younger brother Gao Zeng (高增) in 1903 in his hometown Jinshan.

Gao went to study politics and law in Hosei University, Japan in 1904, and became a member of Tongmenghui in Tokyo. He was one of the first members of Tongmenghui. Gao led Tongmenghui's branch in Jiangsu and was the provincial Director-general (主盟人). Gao returned to Shanghai in 1906 where he founded Jianxing Gongxue (健行公學), a private school in Songjiang (now Songjiang District, Shanghai). Gao soon had to dissociate his school because of the high pressure from the government. Gao also founded a women's school – Qinming Women's School (欽明女校) in Liuxi (留溪).

After the Xinhai Revolution, Gao became a governmental official and was the director of the legislative bureau in Jianshan. Gao was elected Member of the House of Representatives of the Republic of China in 1912, and was invited to join the congress in Beiping (now Beijing). In Beiping, Gao was disappointed by Yuan Shikai's policies therefore refused firmly to cooperate with him and his cabinet. Immediately after Yuan's death in 1916, Gao was invited to Beiping again. However, the Parliament was soon dissociated and Gao went back to Shanghai.

Gao co-founded the South Society on 13 November 1909 with Chen Qubing (陳去病, 1874–1933, a native from Suzhou) and Liu Yazi (柳亞子, 1887－1958, also a native of Suzhou). The society gained huge influence and popularity in 1910s and 1920s. It became the largest literature and poetry society during that period time in China. His uncle Gao Xie (高燮) and nephew Yao Guang (姚光) were also leading figures of the society.

Gao founded several then-influential magazines, including:

- Juemin (《覺民》, founded in 1903, official publication of the Juemin Society),
- Jiangsu (《江蘇》), named after Jiangsu Province,
- Xingshi (《醒獅》, founded in 1905).

== Poetry ==
Gao gained fame for his poems. His style is close to those of Tang and Song poets. According to himself, Gao was also influenced by Huang Zunxian, another famous poet during the late Qing dynasty. Gao also wrote many poems related to Japanese society while he was studying and traveling in Japan in 1904.

== See also ==
- Tongmenghui
- South Society

Gao's relatives:

- Gao Xie (Gao's uncle), a notable writer, poet, artist, publisher, book and antique collector.
- Ping-Tse Kao, an astronomer, the Kao (crater) is named after him.
- Charles K. Kao, pioneer of fiber optics and fiber-optic communication, Nobel Prize in Physics recipient in 2009.
- Qing poetry
