= Helmert (crater) =

Crater on the Moon

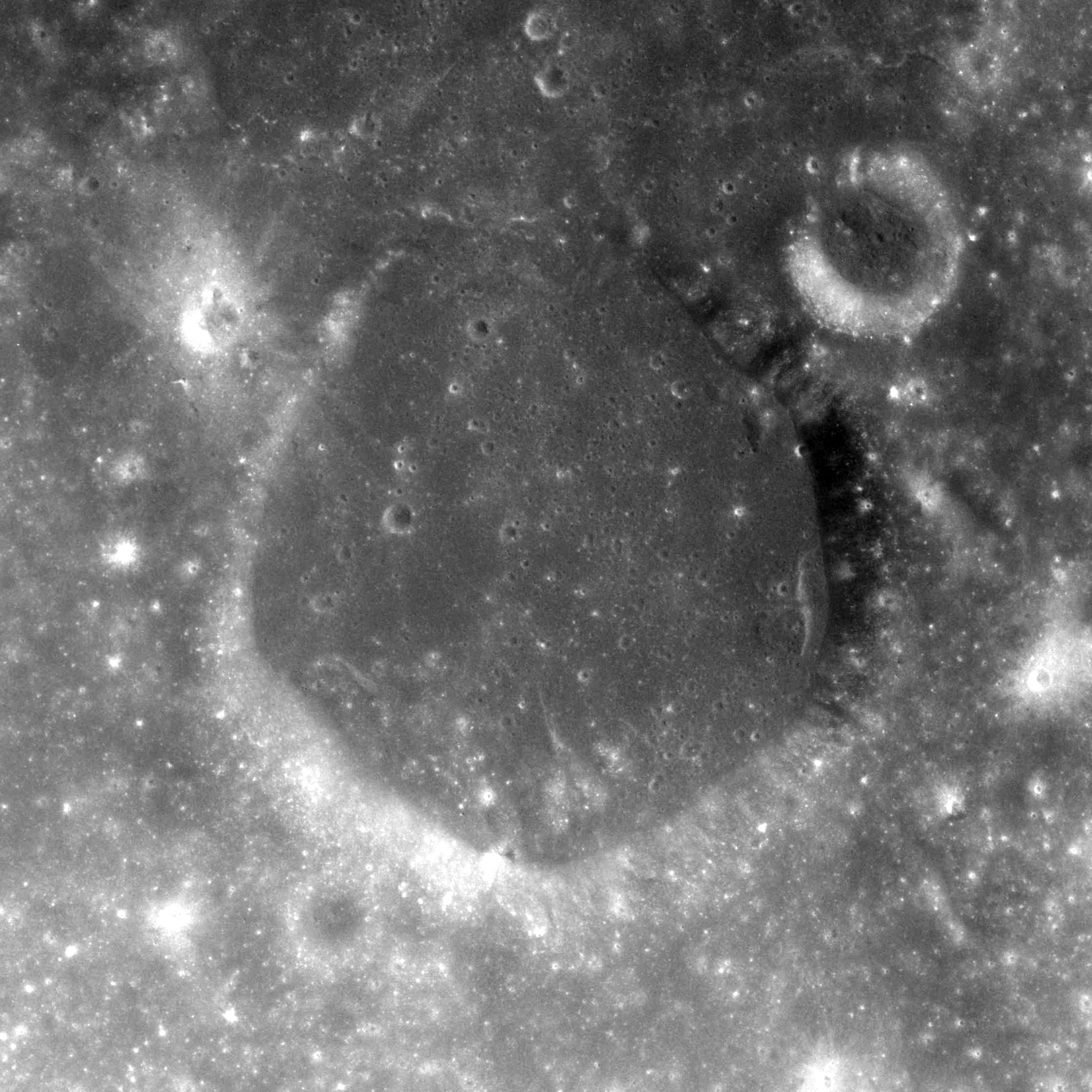
- Apollo 8 Hasselblad camera image
- Coordinates: 7.56°S 87.67°E
- Diameter: 26.72 km
- Depth: 1.0 km
- Colongitude: 273° at sunrise
- Eponym: Friedrich R. Helmert

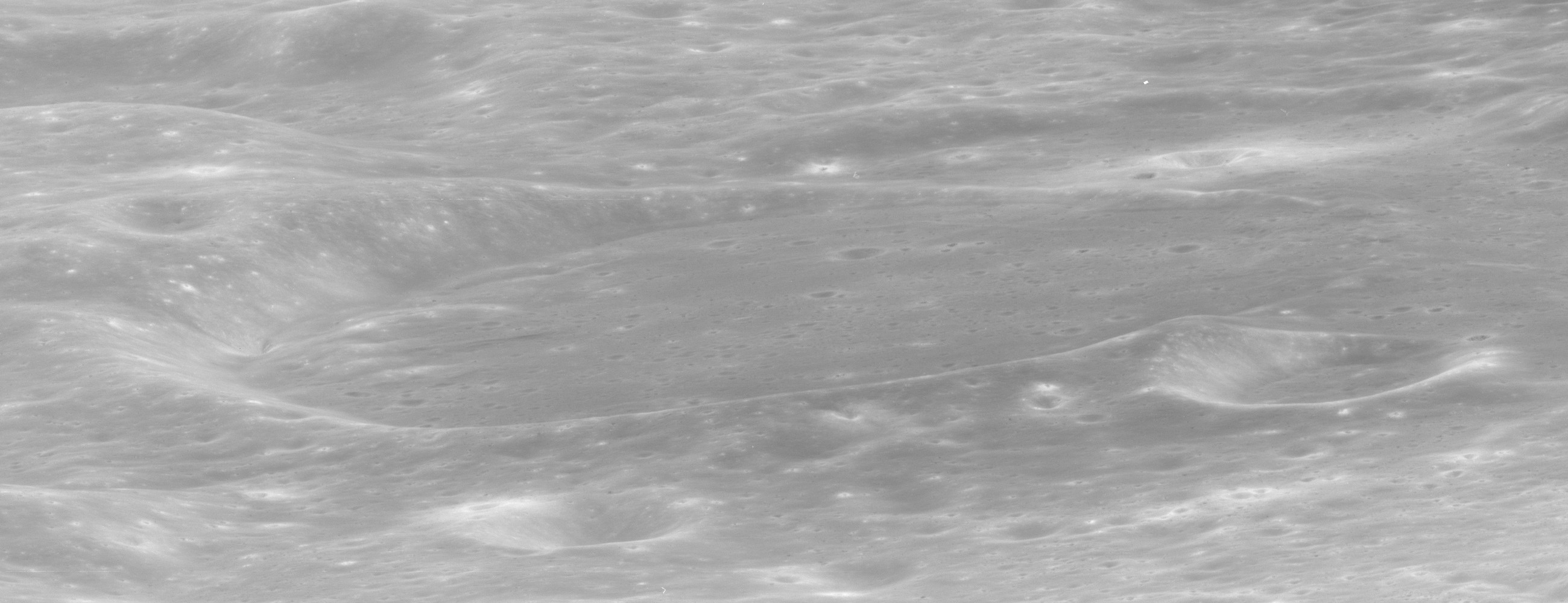
Oblique view from Apollo 17

Helmert is a lunar impact crater at the southern edge of the Mare Smythii. It lies near the eastern limb of the Moon, and from the Earth it is seen nearly from the side. The visibility of this feature can be strongly affected by libration of the Moon in its orbit.

This crater forms part of a merged pair with the similar crater Kao on its northern side. There is a gap in the rims where these two craters are joined, and the interior floors have been resurfaced by lava, leaving a level surface across the bottom of both craters. This floor is nearly featureless, and has the same low albedo as the dark lunar mare to the north. The outer rim has a small crater joined to the eastern edge of the northern gap, but is otherwise not overlain by any notable craters.

Helmert crater is approximately 1000 meters deep based on the high point along its eastern rim and the center of the crater. The southern crater cuts into highlands which rise more than 2 km above the crater floor.

The crater's name was approved by the IAU in 1973.
