= Qingdao Observatory =

Observatory on the summit of Guanxiang Mountain, China

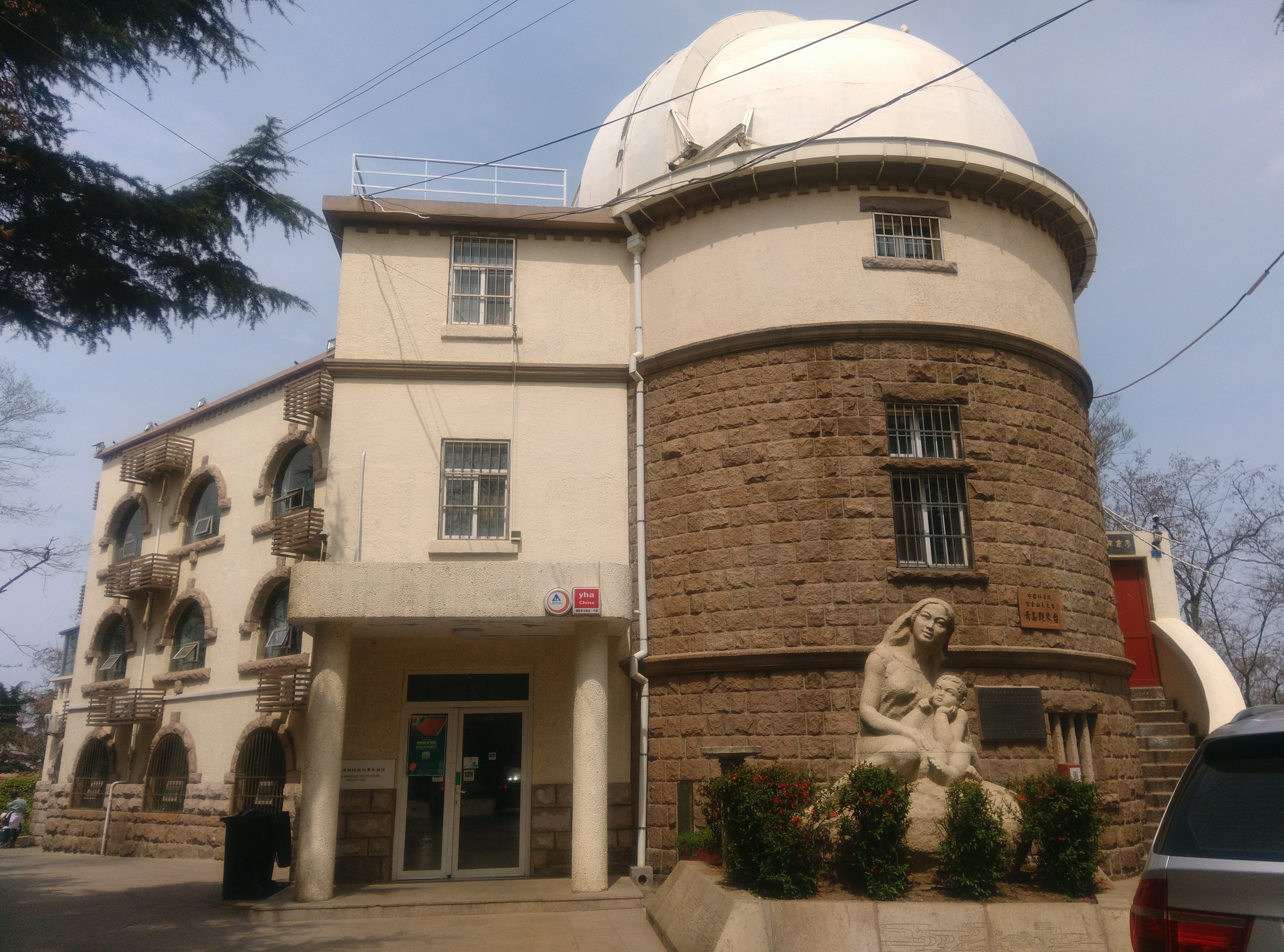
- Dome Room of Qingdao Observatory, built between 1930 and 1931
- Interactive map of the Qingdao Observatory area

General information
- Location: Shinan District Qingdao Shandong Province China, No. 21 Guanxiang Er Road
- Coordinates: 36°04′12.5″N 120°19′16″E
- Elevation: 75 m

The Qingdao Observatory is located on the summit of Guanxiang Mountain in the Shinan District of Qingdao, China. The existing building complex was originally built in 1905. Qingdao Observatory was once an important scientific research institute in Qingdao, and also played an important role in the development of modern meteorology and marine science in China. Together with Shanghai Xujiahui Observatory and Hong Kong Observatory, they once were known as the "Three Observatory in the Far East". Qingdao Observatory has been listed as "Meteorology Observation Dome" amongst the "Top Ten Scenic Spots in Qingdao". Its building complex now belongs to the North Sea Fleet of the PLA (People's Liberation Army) Navy and the Zijinshan Observatory of the Chinese Academy of Sciences, and is part of the Qingdao German Building Complex, a national key cultural relics conservation site.

== History ==
=== Establishment and initial development of the observatory ===
On July 23, 1896, the German navy Iltis gunboat was hit by the storm and sunk in the waters of the Yongluo Island in Rongcheng, Qingdao. The German navy believed that the lack of an accurate weather forecast was one of the reasons for this shipwreck. In 1898, German geographer Ferdinand von Richthofen proposed in his book Shandong and its portal Jiaozhou Bay (German: Schantung und seine Eingangspforte Kiautschou) to repurpose the Jiaozhou Bay Leased Territory of Qingdao into a scientific research centre with an observatory to observe marine weather.

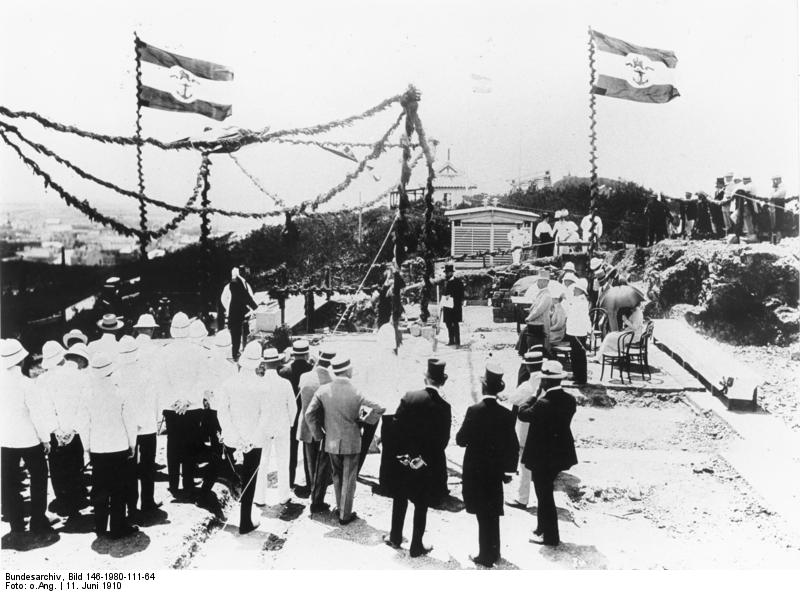
Groundbreaking ceremony of the observatory building, 11 June 1910

On March 1, 1898, the German Navy Port Surveying Department set up a temporary organisation responsible for astronomical meteorological observations and land surveys in Qingdao. Their base of operations was officially named Metrology and Astronomy Observatory on June 14 of the same year. It is currently located in office blocks surrounding the Public Security Bureau of Qingdao, and initially served only to observe temperature, humidity, rainfall, wind force, etc. The institute conducts meteorological observations 3 times per day and reports daily weather maps and forecasts (including storm warnings). In 1904, Qingdao Observatory extended its operations to astronomy and timekeeping functions. On May 10, 1905, the observatory moved to Guanshan Mountain. In 1909, the observatory's operations extended further to include topographic surveys and geomagnetic, seismic, tide and sunspot observations.

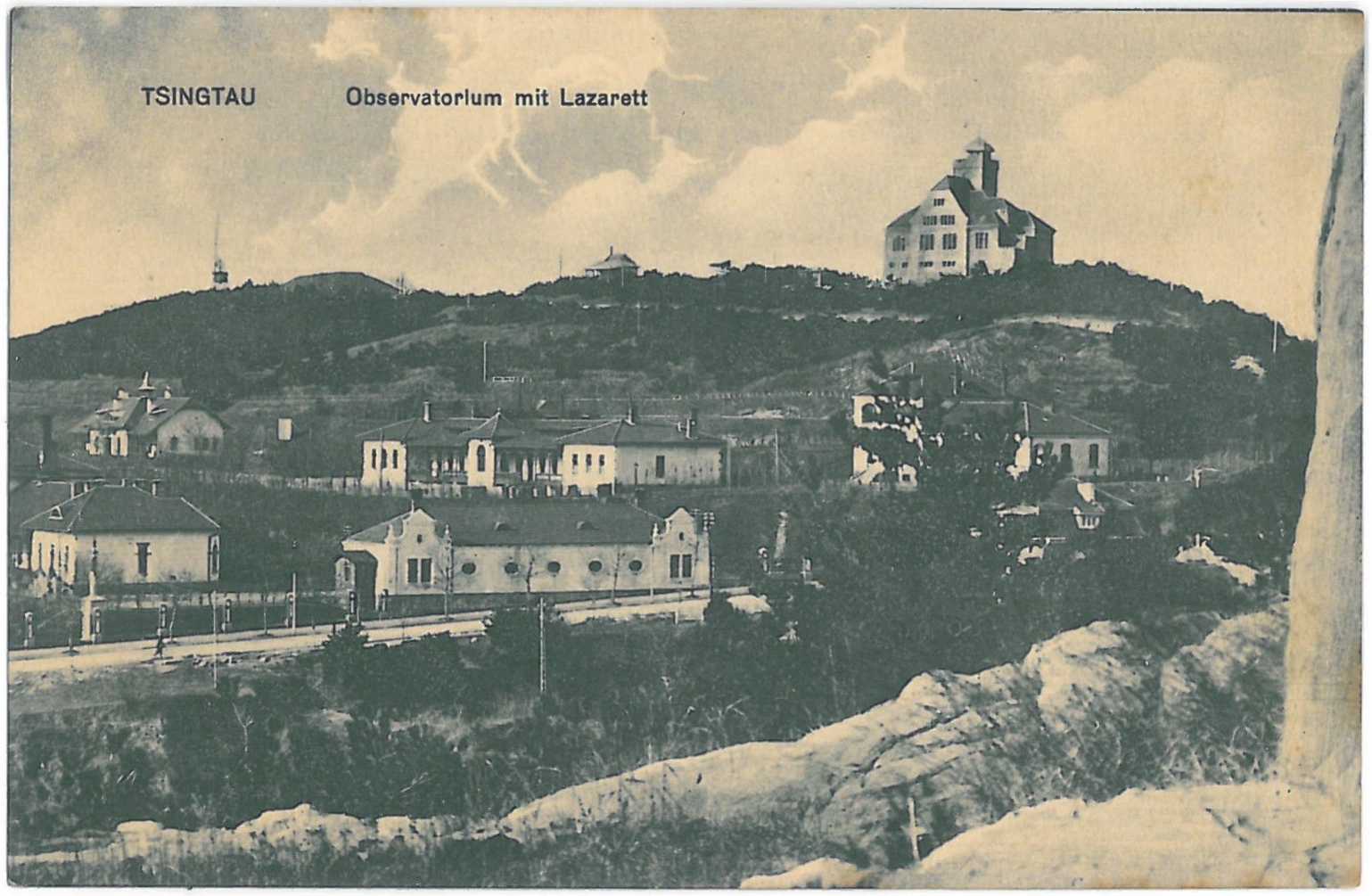
Observatory and the Dushu hospital at the foot of the mountain

On January 1, 1911, the observatory was officially renamed the Royal Observatory of Qingdao. On January 9, 1912, the observatory building was completed. The Qingdao New Newspaper and the Shanghai German Newspaper subsequently reported the inauguration ceremony of the Observatory. At the end of Germany's lease for Qingdao territory in 1914, the scientific scope of the observatory has already encompassed astronomy, meteorology, earthquakes, geomagnetism, tide observations, timekeeping, topographic surveys, and sea surveys. There were more than ten observatories in Jinan and the Weixian County along the Jiaoji Railway as well.

=== Japanese occupation period and its once unsolved case ===
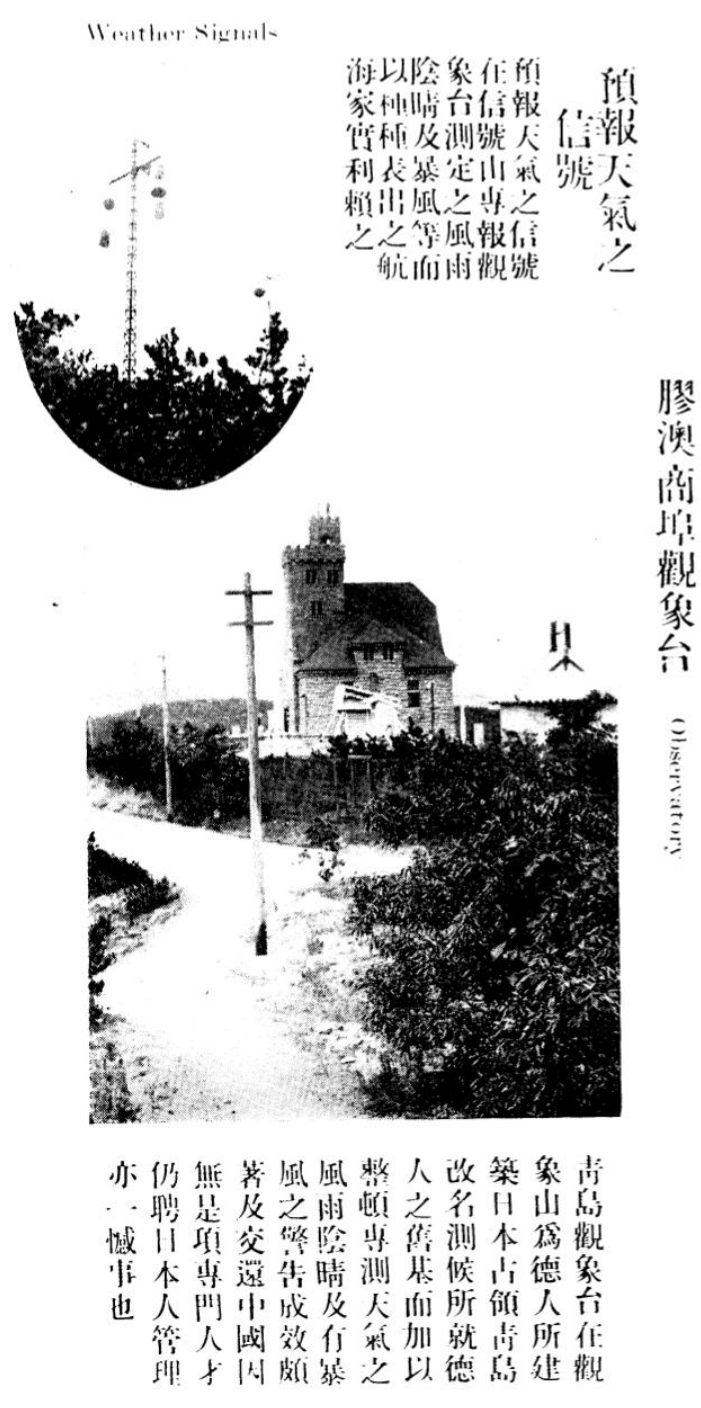
The Recording of the Observatory in Taking Over Qingdao Memorial Photo

After the Japanese army occupied Qingdao in November 1914, the Qingdao Observatory was taken over by the Japanese Navy's temporary Qingdao Port Division and renamed the Qingdao Observatory.

In December 1922, the Chinese government took back Qingdao's sovereignty. According to an annex to the "Shangdong Cases Detailed Agreement" signed by the Chinese and Japanese parties on December 1, Japanese personnel would be granted temporary stay after the handover of the meteorological observatory, including Chinese meteorologists Jiang Bingran, Zhu Kezhen, and astronomer Gao Pingzi, but Japan touted the content of the agreement and refused the handover. Claiming that China had no meteorologists, they proposed a partial handover until China had professional personnel. Jiang Bingran along with others held the handover ceremony, however the Japanese still retained significant control over the meteorology observatory.

Regarding the taking back of the meteorological station, the Ministry of Foreign Affairs and the Jiaoao Commercial Port Supervisor Office have repeatedly negotiated with the Japanese Minister in China and the Japanese Consul General in Qingdao.

After China officially took over the observatory, Japanese personnel still refused to withdraw and continued to use the observatory instruments for observation, sending data back to Japan. In October 1924, the former director of the Qingdao Observatory Iruma Takeshi stated in "the Opinion" that "China already has talents for astronomical and meteorological observation who are able to shoulder responsibility. I hope that the Chinese government can finalise the pending case so that Japanese personnel can return to their country as soon as possible". However, the Japanese government repeatedly evaded responsibility, resulting in the pending case remaining unresolved. Japanese personnel did not leave the observatory until the end of 1937 when Japanese nationals evacuated from Qingdao.

=== Development during the Republic of China period ===
On October 10, 1924, Jiang Bingran, Zhu Kezhen, Gao Lu, and others initiated the establishment of the Chinese Meteorological Society at the Qingdao Observatory, with the purpose of pursuing "progress in meteorological science and development of weather forecasting". In 1925, the observatory built a small domed equatorial chamber on the west side of the observation field and fitted a 16-cm refracting telescope left over from the Germans to observe sunspots; this accumulated China's first batch of sunspot observation data.

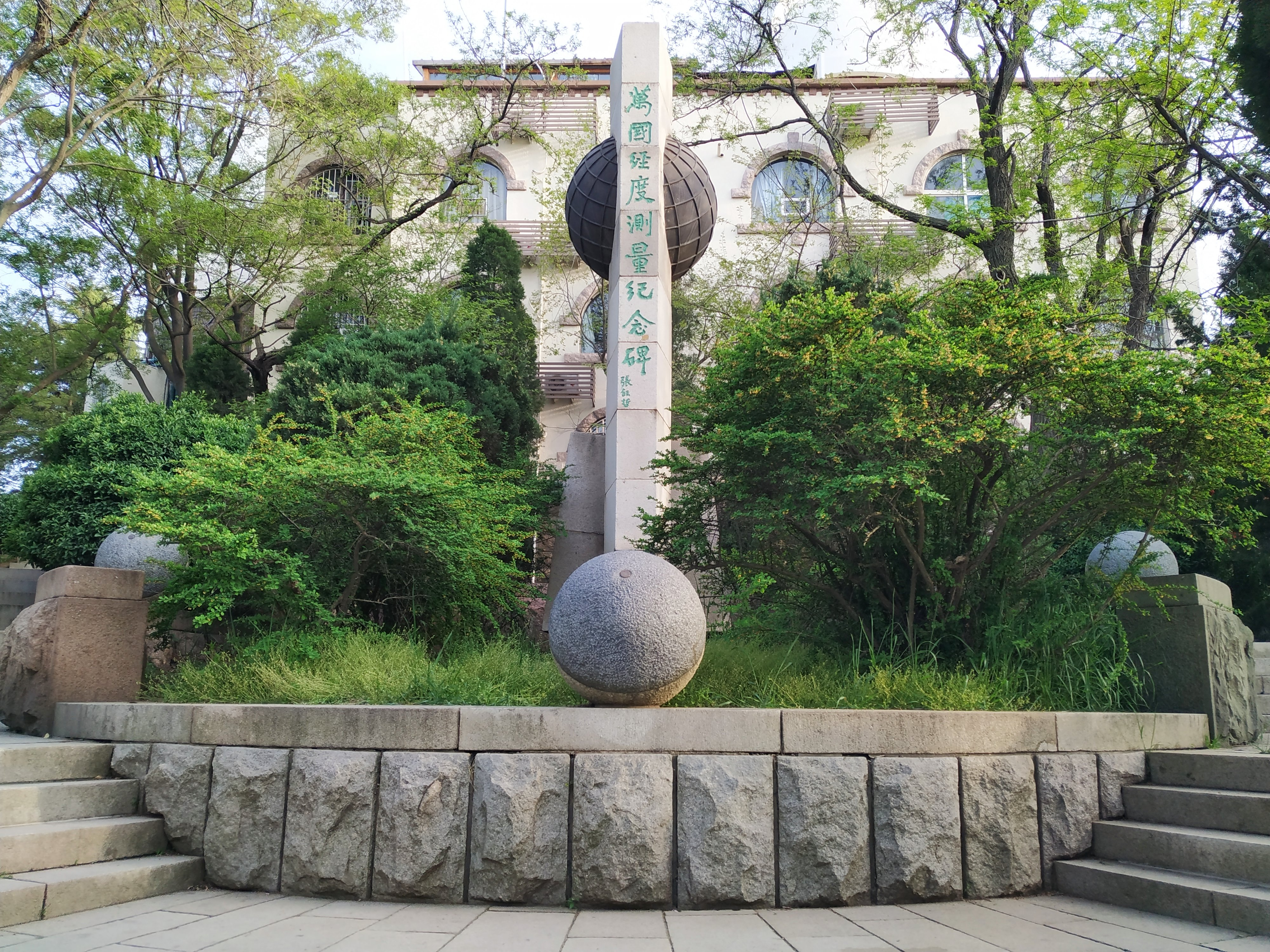
"Longitude Measurement Monument", established in 1987 to commemorate the observatory's participation in the Longitude Survey of the World

In May 1926, Gustav Felier, Chairman of the International Longitude Survey Committee, sent a letter inviting the Qingdao Observatory to participate in the first International Longitude Survey (also known as the Longitude Survey of the World). The Ministry of Education therefore appointed the Qingdao Observatory as the sole representative of Chinese research institutes in the scientific community to participate in the event. Director of the observatory, Jiang Bingran, inspected various observatories in Shanghai and Hong Kong in the summer of that year. He believed that the Qingdao Observatory lacked new measuring instruments so he applied for 5,000 rmb in funding from the General Office of Jiaoao Commercial Port Bureau to purchase new instruments.

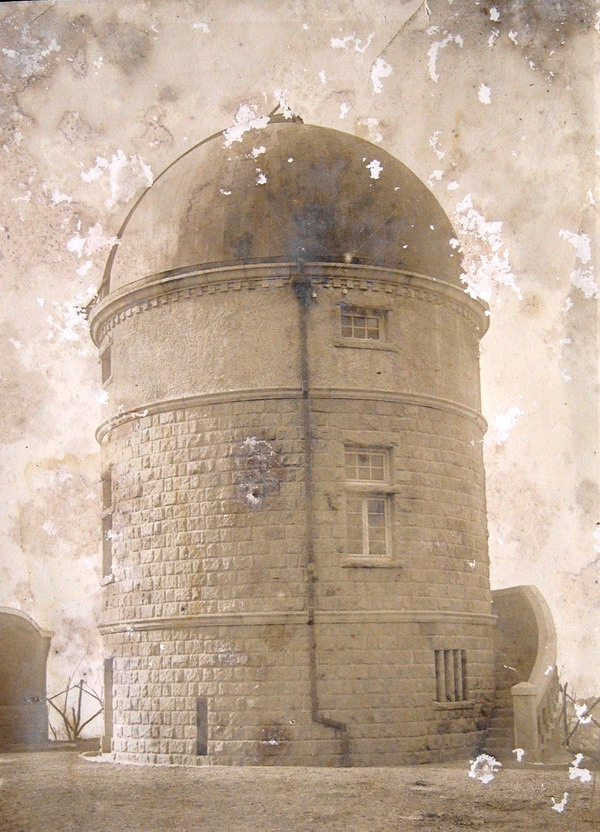
Original Doom Room of Qingdao Observatory

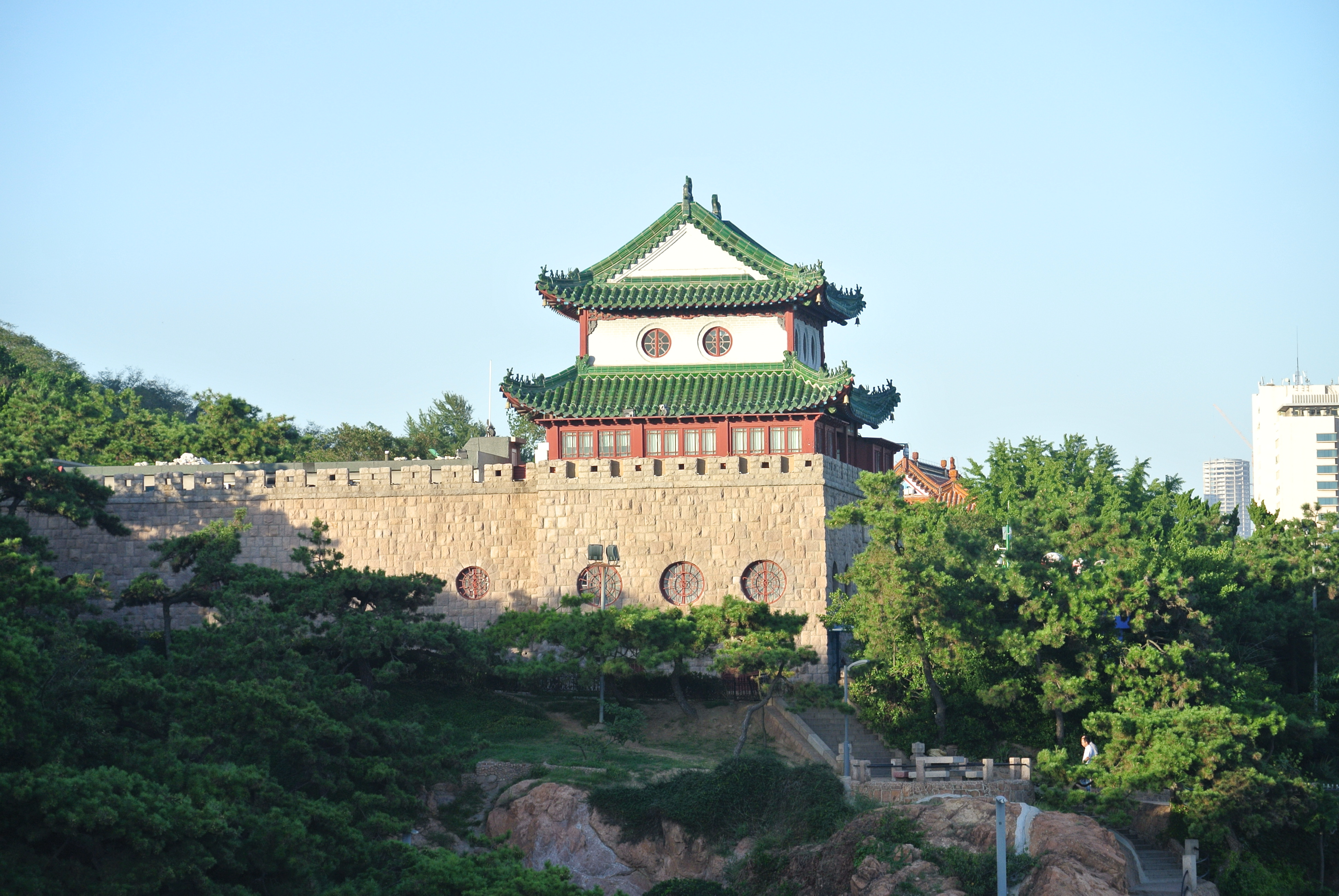
Qingdao Aquarium, 2016

On August 12, 1930, the Chinese Academy of Sciences held the 15th Annual Conference at the Qingdao National University, during which Cai Yuanpei, Yang Xingfo, Li Shizeng, Zhu Kezhen, Jiang Bingran, Song Chunyi and others jointly proposed first the construction of the Qingdao Aquarium, and then the establishment of the China Ocean Research Institute. It was later agreed to be designed by the Observatory's Marine Office and located at Waterfront Park on Laiyang Road. The Qingdao Aquarium was the largest and most advanced marine science exhibition hall in China at the time.

In March 1932, the observatory began to implement high-altitude observations once a day as reference for weather forecasts. Later, upon the request of China Airlines, the observatory provided daily high-altitude observation data to airlines. (According to some, the pilot-balloon observation began from March 1932, once every two days, and then the pilot balloon was provided by China Airlines, and the observation changed to a daily frequency).

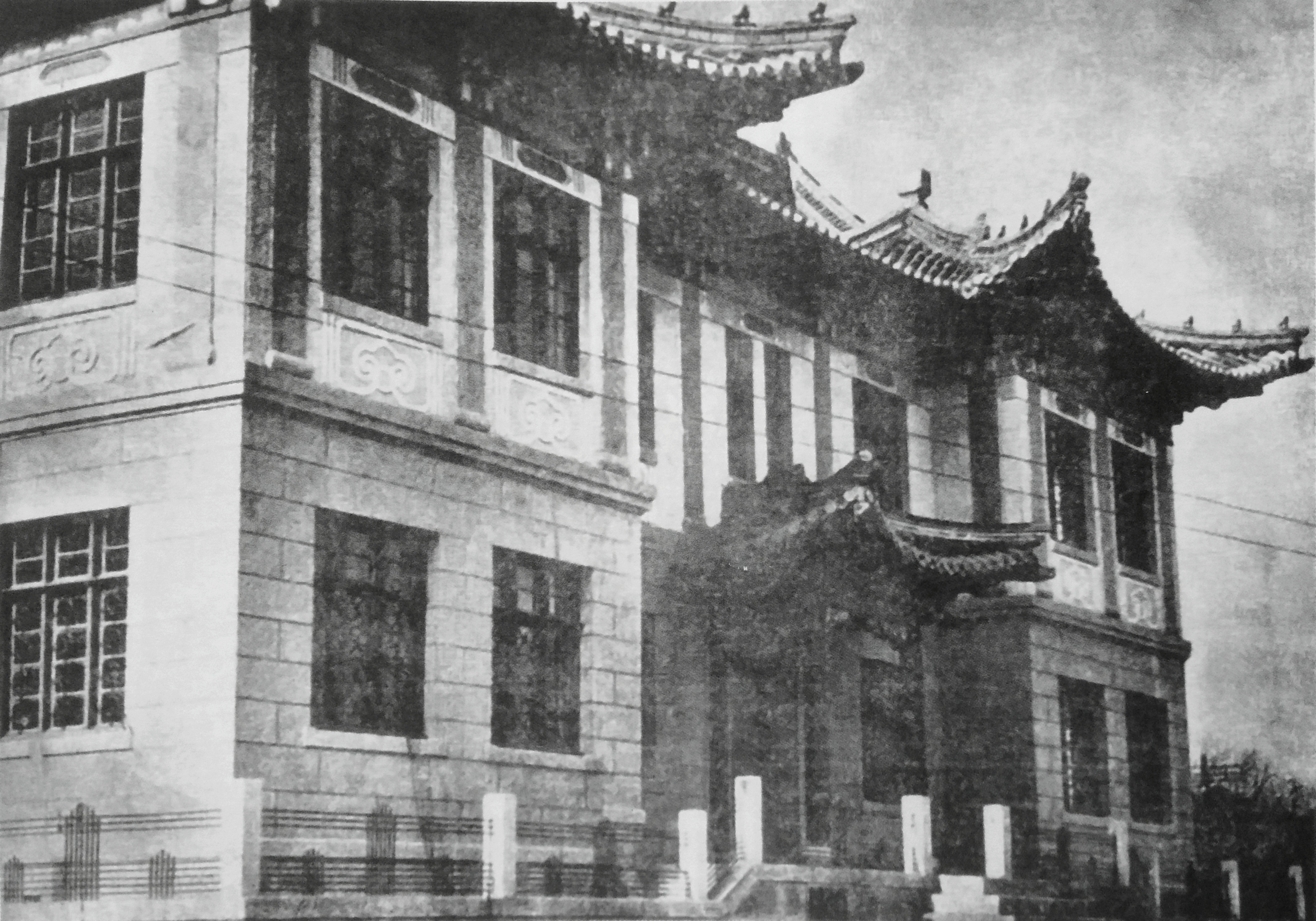
Original Qingdao Coastal Biology Research Institute

In April 1935, the China Branch of the Oceanographic Group of the Pacific Scientific Association was established in Nanjing. They planned to set up marine biology research institutes in Xiamen, Dinghai, Qingdao, and Yantai of which Qingdao Coastal Biology Research Institute was co-chaired by Qingdao Observatory and Shandong National University. However, due to the July 7th Incident and the overall outbreak of the Anti-Japanese War, the Institute's work did not begin.

=== Decline and recovery during and after the Sino-Japanese War ===
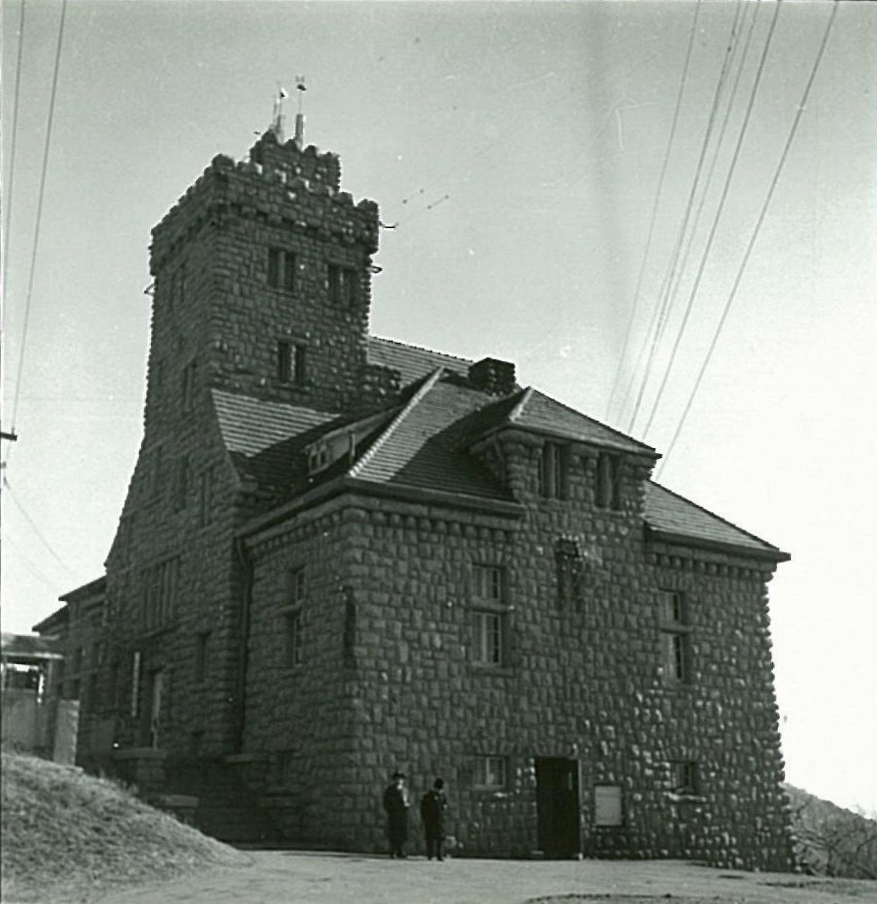
Observatory during the second Japanese occupation

After the July 7th Incident of 1937, Qingdao Observatory personnel evacuated from Qingdao in September. On January 10, 1938, the Japanese navy occupied Qingdao and the observatory was taken over by the Japanese navy. According to Wang Huawen (self-titled as binhua), the first director of the Observatory following the Sino-Japanese War, he interned at the Observatory in his early days during Jiang Bingran's time as director of the Observatory. When taking over it after the Sino-Japanese War, he found that the Observatory was devastated, and many instruments had been destroyed by the Japanese military police.

After Japan surrendered in August 1945, the Chinese Navy Rear Admiral and the North China Naval Reception Commissioner She Zhenxing began to take charge of the Observatory. In December, the Navy transferred it to the Qingdao Municipal Government and resumed its original name: the Qingdao Observatory. From 1946, Wang Huawen served as the director of the observatory and began to organise the restoration of the observatory.

=== Since 1949 ===
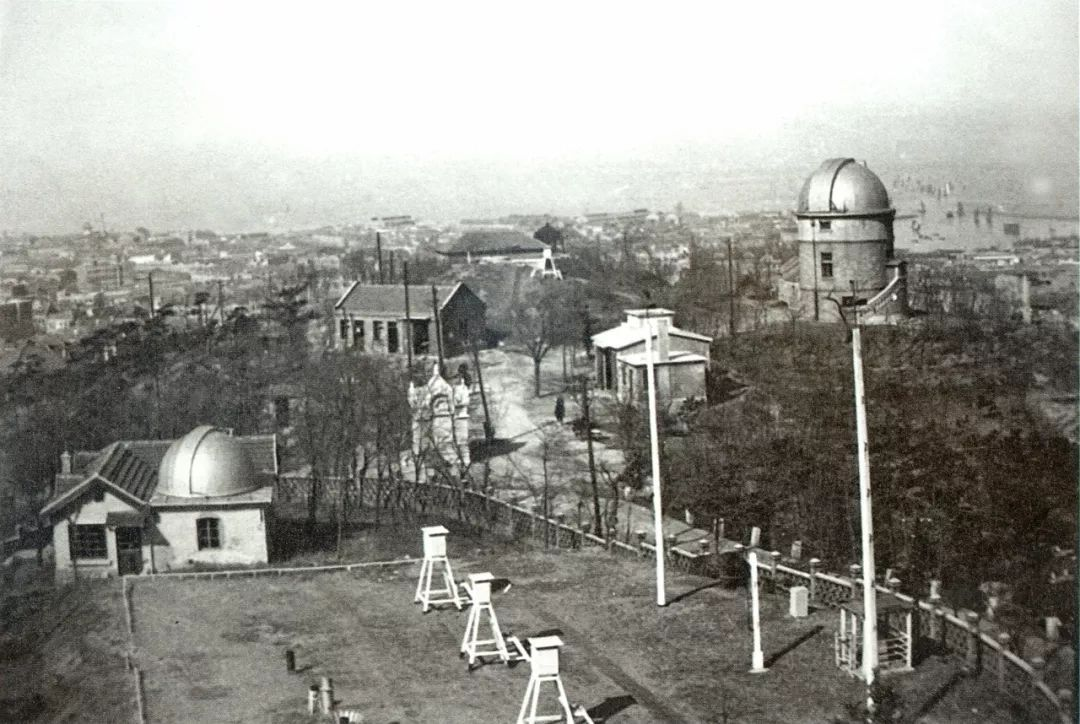
The top of Guanxiang Mountain in the 1950s

On June 2, 1949, the People's Liberation Army gained entry and stationed themselves in Qingdao, which was shortly followed by the Qingdao Military Control Commission taking over the observatory. In May 1958, Qingdao Observatory's geomagnetic and seismic related personnel and instruments were transferred to the Chinese Academy of Sciences' Geophysics Institute in Beijing. The astronomy section was reconstructed and renamed the Qingdao Observatory, affiliated with the Chinese Academy of Sciences' Purple Mountain Observatory, and astronomical observations continued relying on the dome room and other facilities in the observatory.

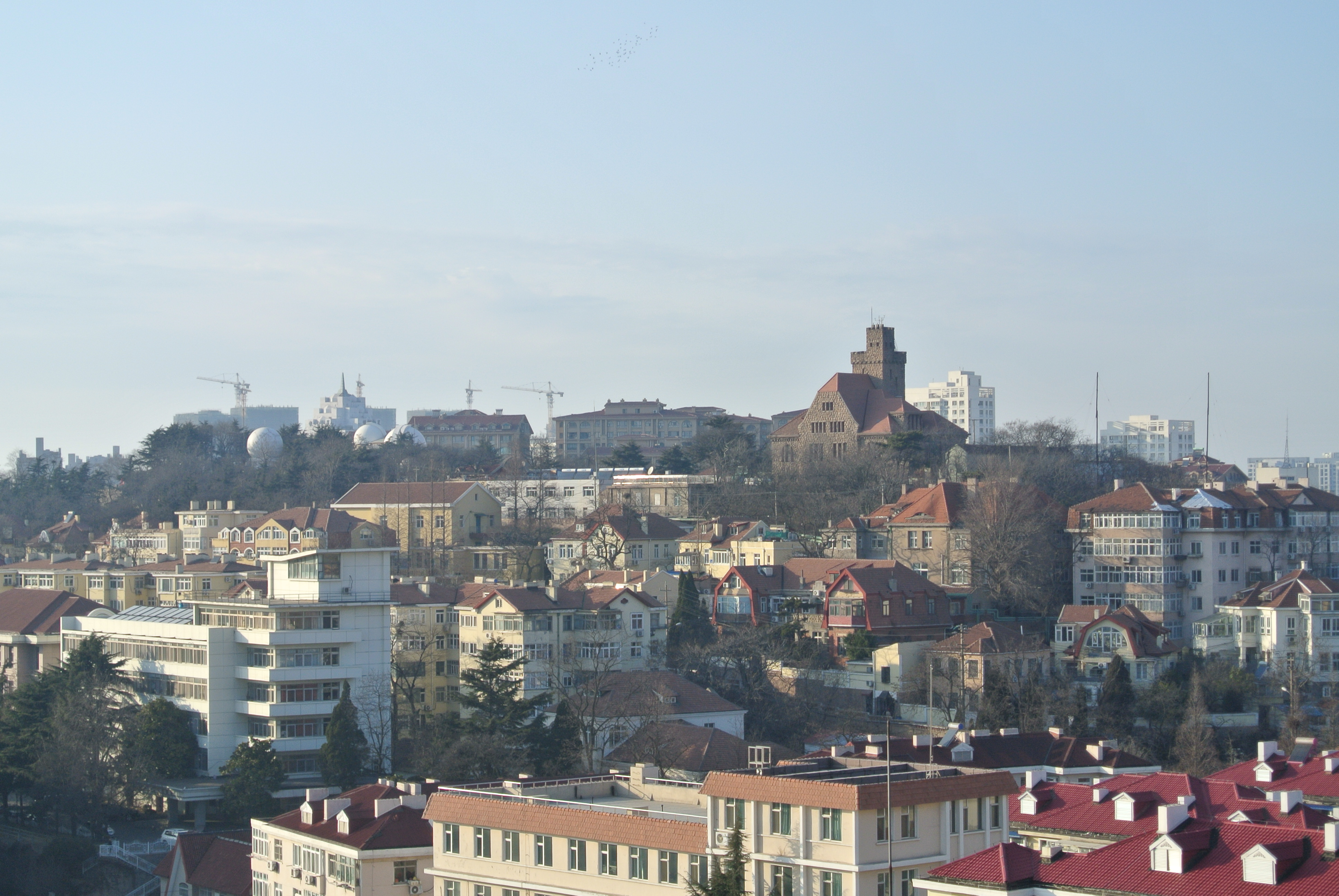
View from Guanxiang Hill and Observation Deck from Signal Hill, 2015

Qingdao Observatory's main functions include astronomical observation and science popularisation through events and activities. It is open to the public from time to time. When special astronomical phenomena occur, it may also be open to the public for observation. Qingdao Observatory organises astronomical stargaze, astronomical summer camps and other events as well. In 2012, the observatory was recognised as a national science education centre by the China Association for Science and Technology. The initial part of the observatory dome room which was built in 1931 is still used by the observatory. The expanded part which was built in 1996 is now used by a youth hostel. The Observatory office building built during the period of German Leased Territory is now the residence of the Marine Hydrological and Meteorological Centre of the Navy's North Sea Fleet.

== Architectural characteristics and protection status of cultural relics ==
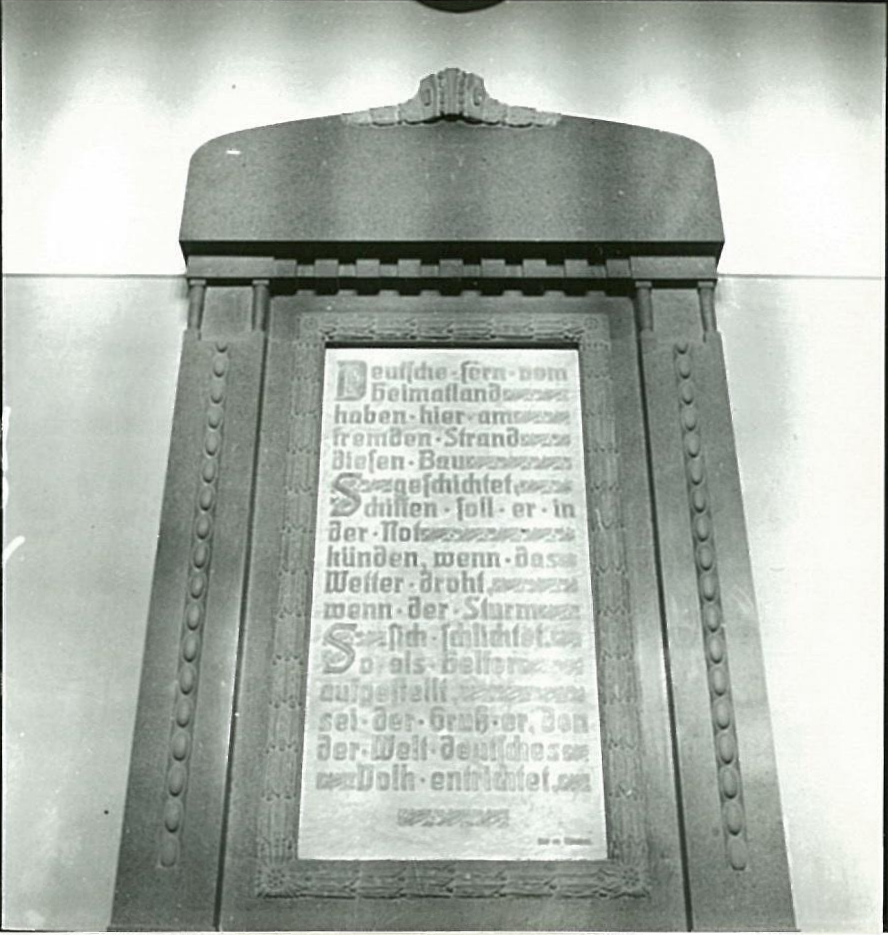
Stele of German poetry in the observatory, shot during the second Japanese occupation period

The office building is located on the top of the east side of the observatory. The platform of the building is 77.76 metres above sea level. The 21.6-metre-high building has a 3-floor main body and 7-floor tower. The outer walls are all made of granite stone and the roof slopes with beef-tongue-like tiles. The parapet wall at the top of the tower is constructed into a castellated shape. The entire building is shaped like a medieval European castle. According to German naval literature, the Observatory building is designed with the following: offices, laboratories, libraries, public reading rooms, a temperature-controlled basement with clocks, temperature coefficient-measuring rooms equipped with a dual heating system, metalwork workshops and other auxiliary rooms. The ground floor of the building lays a fuchsia glazed tile floor connected by stone steps. There is still a white marble stone monuments intact on the corridor wall, engraved with a German poem by German poet Ernst von Wildenbruch.|Ernst von Wildenbruch}}

The poem	English translation
Deutsche fern vom Heimatland haben hier am fremden Strand diesen Bau geschichtet; Schiffen soll er in der Not künden, wenn das Wetter droht, wenn der Sturm sich schlichtet. So als Helfer aufgestellt, sei der Gruß er, den der Welt deutsches Volk entrichtet.	Germans far from home have here on the foreign beach layered this building It forecasts ship in an emergency announces when the weather threatens When the storm is settling it positioned as a helper and the greeting for the world that German people sent

In 2000, the Observatory site was listed amongst the first batch of historically outstanding buildings in Qingdao. In 2006, the Observatory site was listed amongst the sixth batch of national key cultural relics observation sites in the extansive list of the German architectural complex. The scope of protection falls within the courtyard of No. 15 Guan Xiang Er Lu Road and 20 metres around the outer wall of the astronomical observation dome. Guan Xiang Shan Park is included in the construction control zone.

== Atlas ==
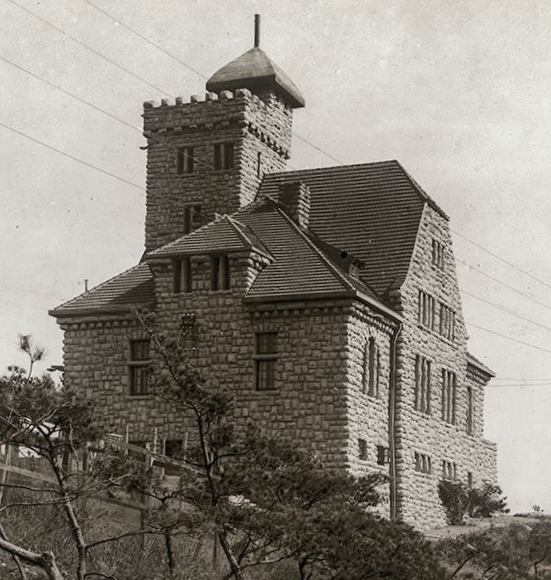
Qingdao Observatory during the German occupation period

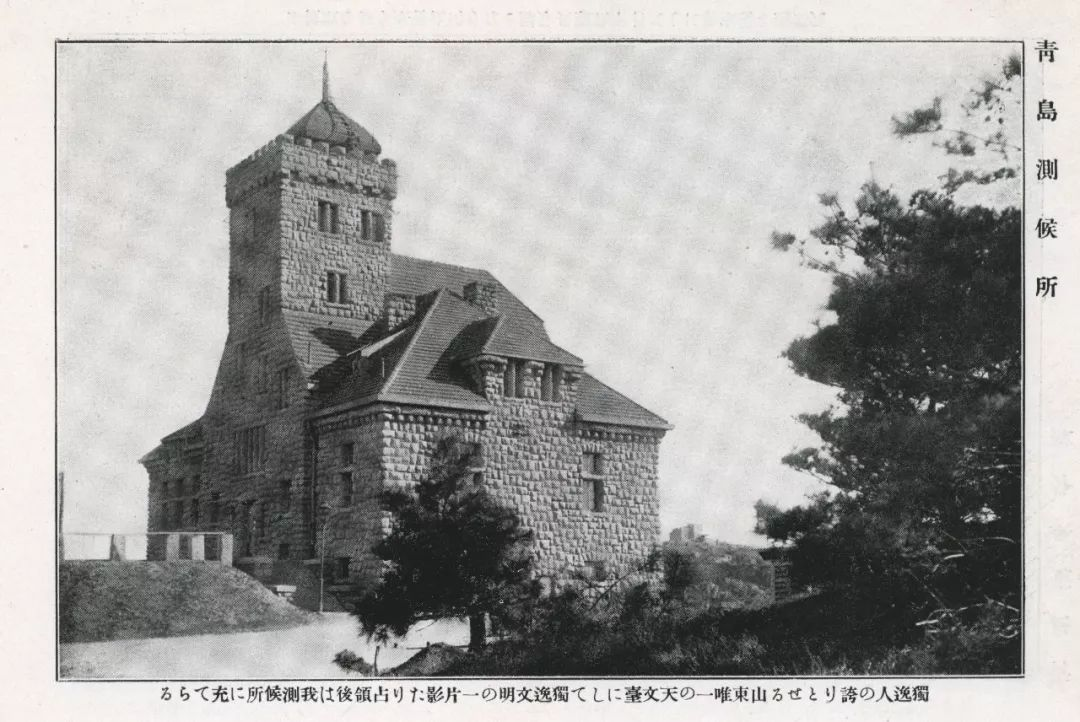
Qingdao Observatory during the first Japanese occupation period

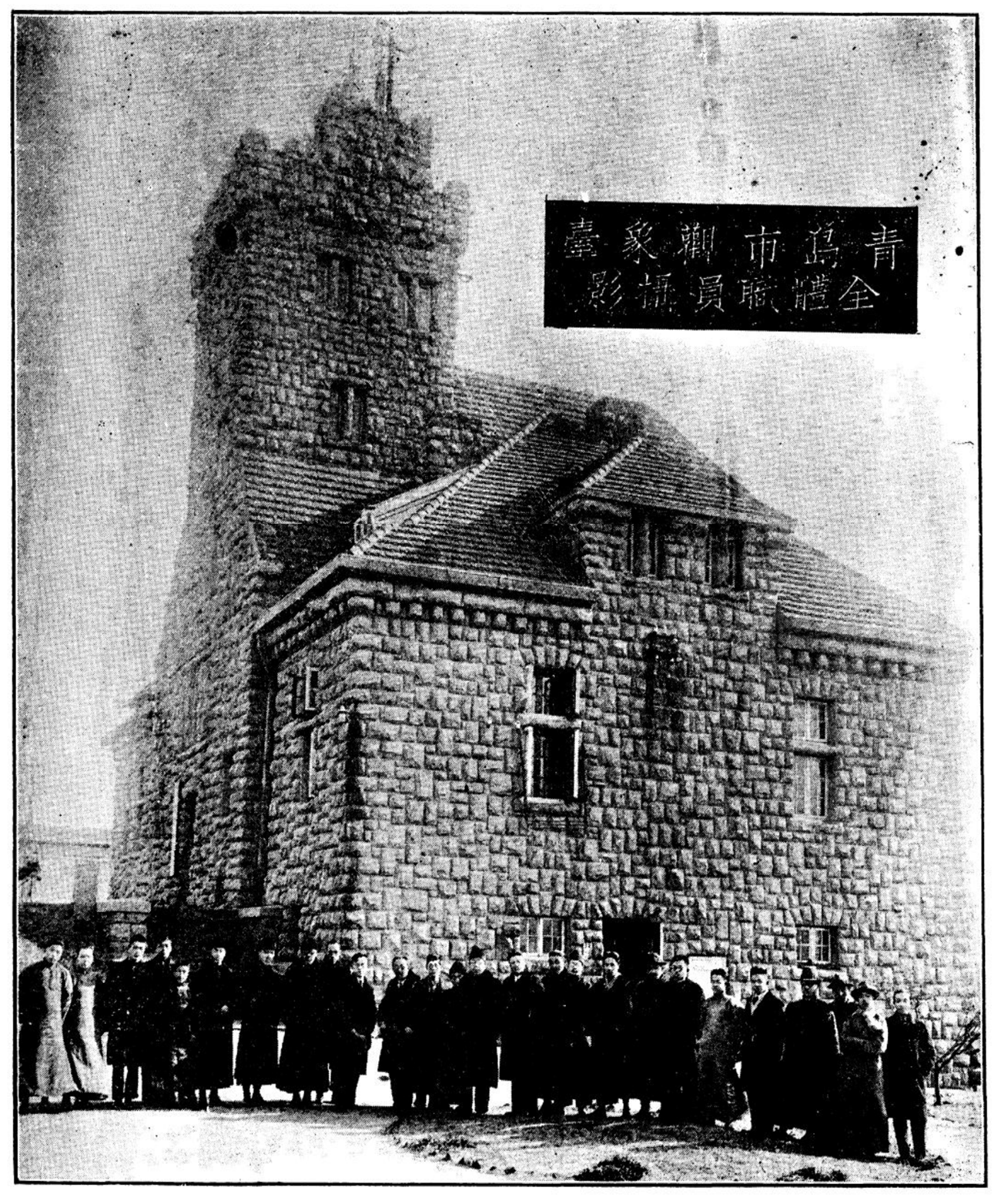
Group photo of the personnel of the observatory in Autograph Book for the Tenth Anniversary of Qingdao Observatory, 1934

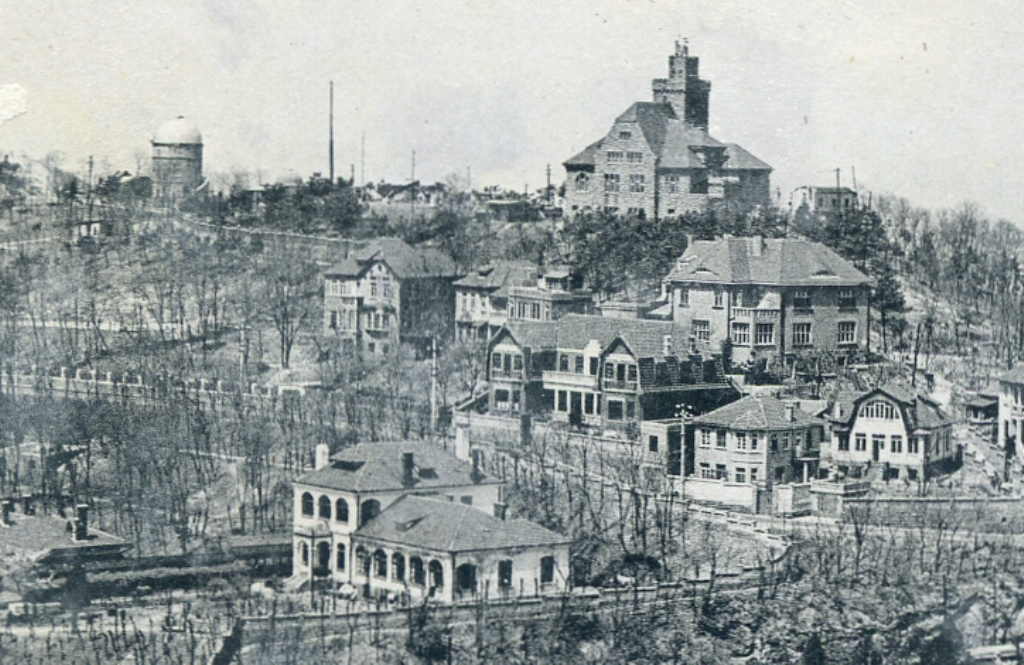
Guanxiang Mountain in the 1930s

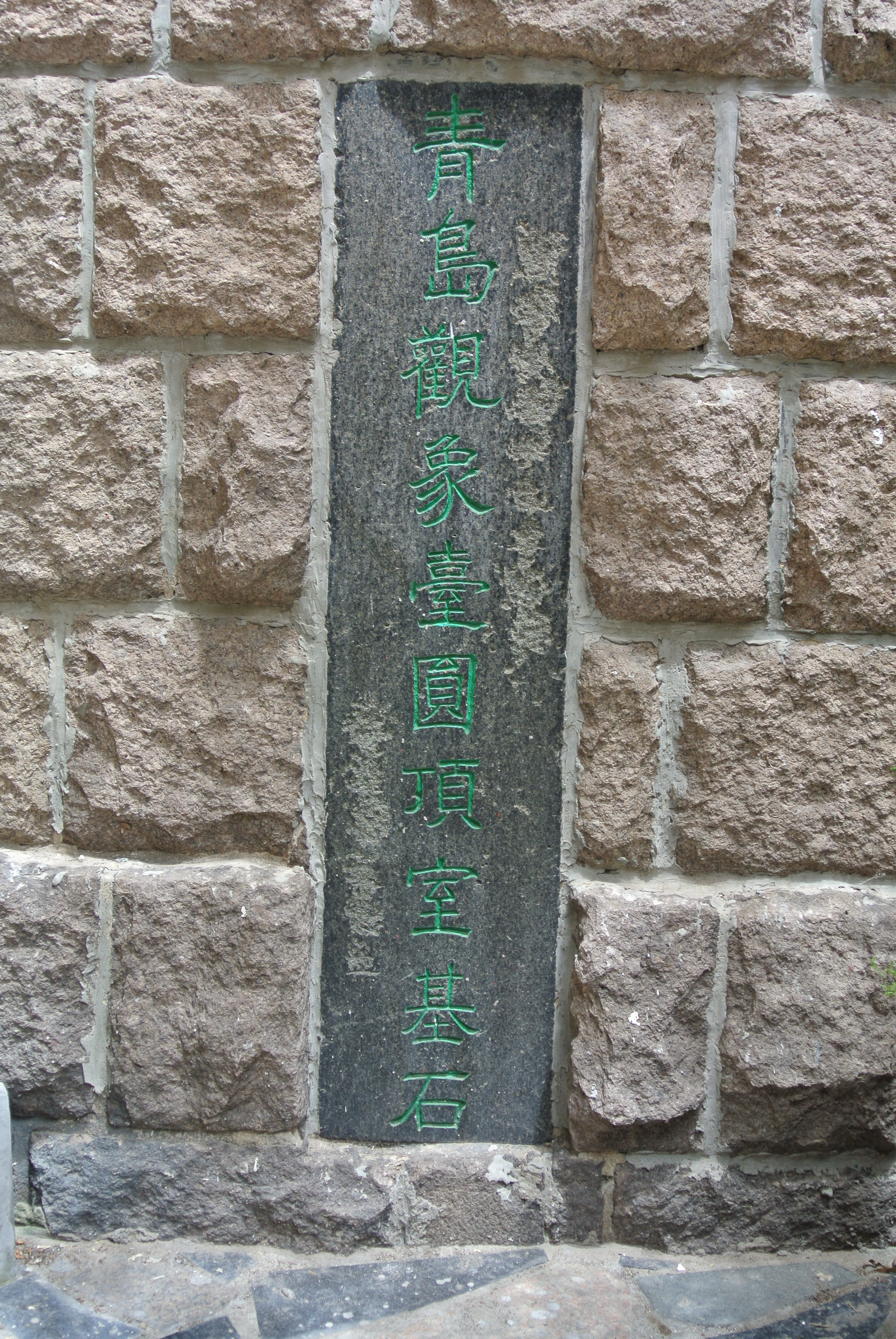
The cornerstone of the dome room with part of its text chiseled

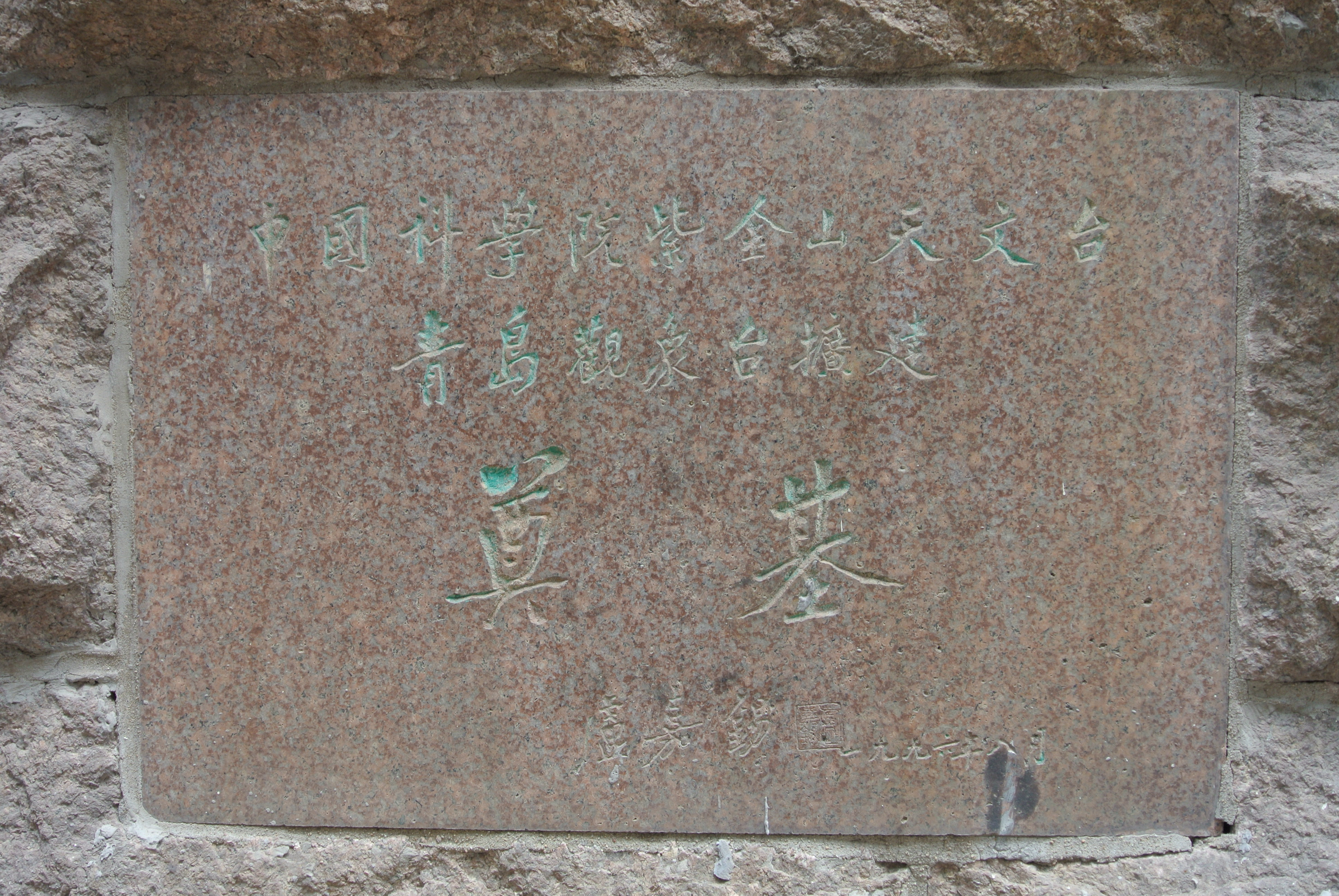
Dome room expansion, 1996

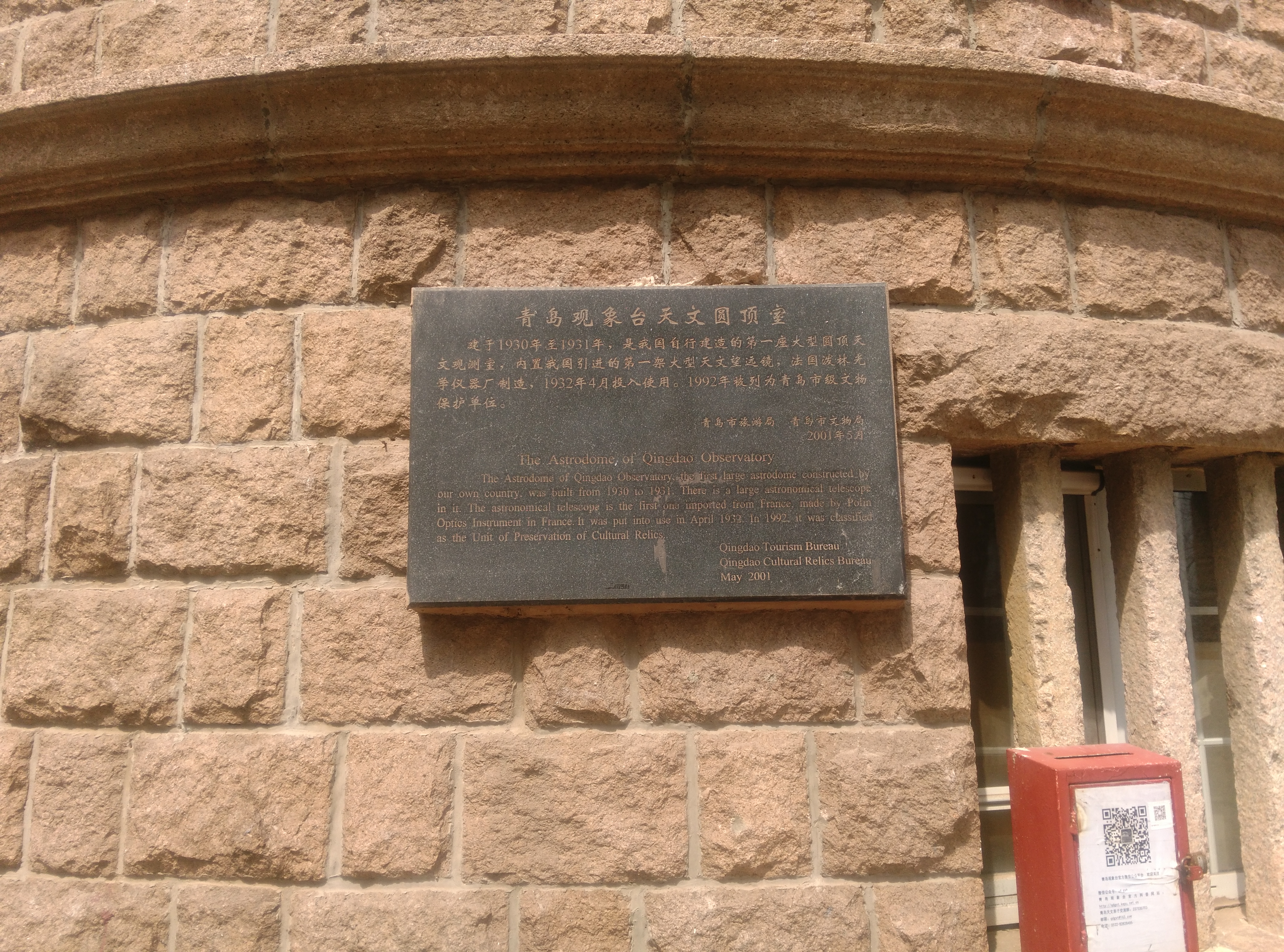
Sign board of the dome room

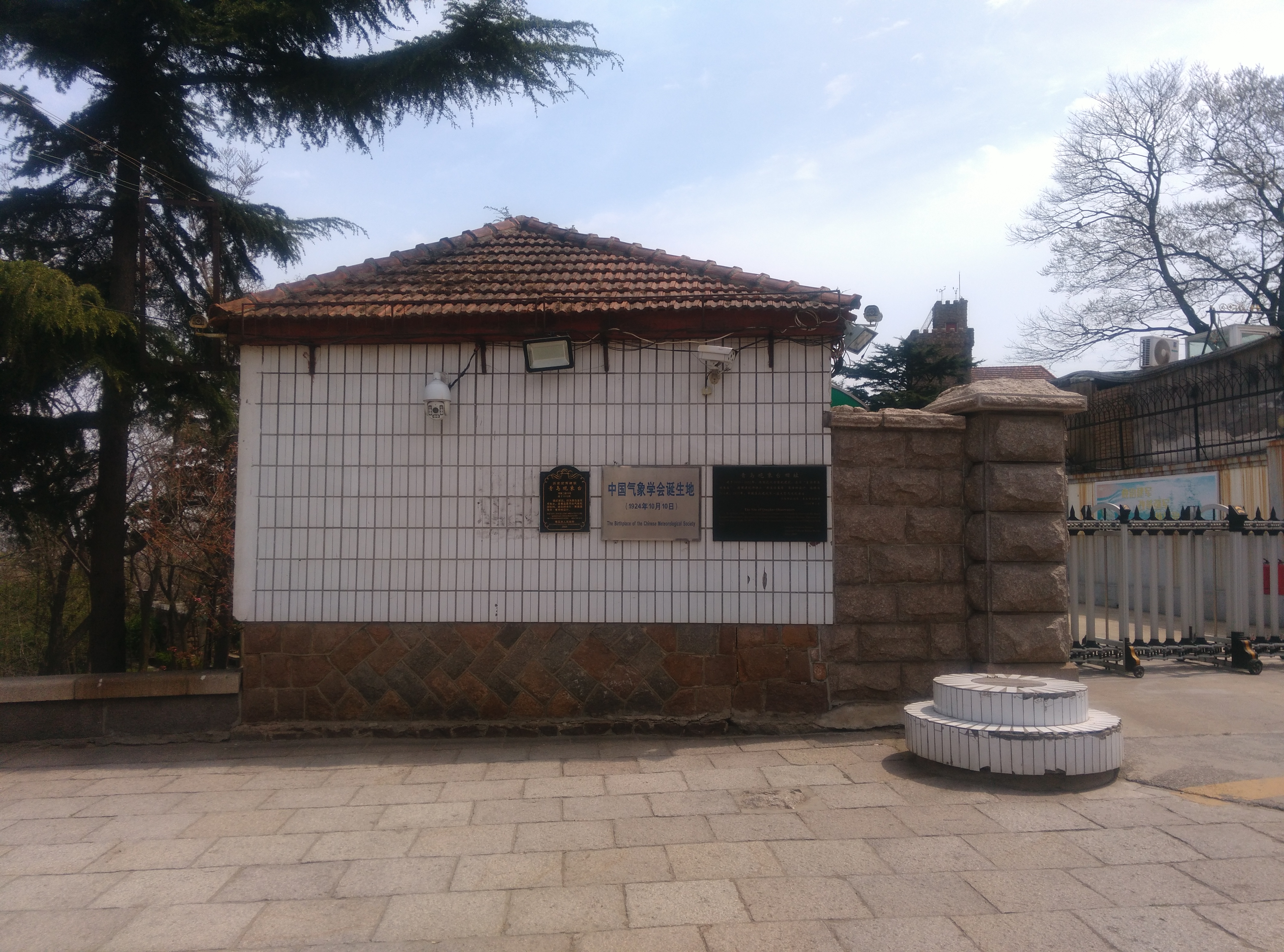
Sign board of the observatory office building courtyard door

== See also ==
- List of astronomical observatories
- The Chinese Academy of Sciences' Purple Mountain Observatory
- The Chinese Academy of Sciences' National Astronomical Observatory
- Original bench mark of the PRC
- Magnetic room of Guanxiang Mountain
- Official residence of the director of the Qingdao Observatory
- Guanxiang Mountain
