= Liu Yazi =

Chinese poet (1887–1958)

- 柳亚子
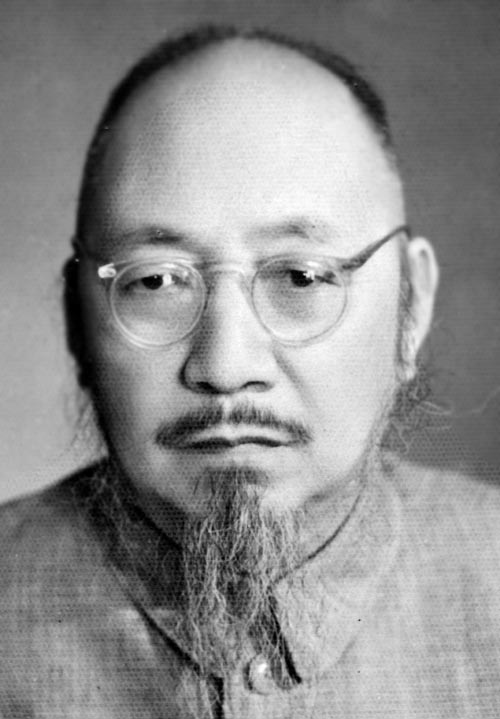

Member of the National People's Congress
- In office 1954–1958

Personal details
- Born: 28 May 1887 Wujiang, Suzhou, China
- Died: 21 June 1958 (aged 71) Beijing, China
- Resting place: Babaoshan Revolutionary Cemetery
- Party: Kuomintang; China Democratic League
- Occupation: politician, poet

Liu Yazi (traditional Chinese: 柳亞子; simplified Chinese: 柳亚子; pinyin: Liǔ Yàzǐ; Wade–Giles: Liu Ya-tzu, 28 May 1887 – 21 June 1958) was a Chinese poet and political activist called the "last outstanding poet of the traditional school". He married Zheng Peiyi in 1906, and was the father of two daughters, Liu Wufei and Liu Wugou, and of a son, Liu Wu-chi, a literary scholar.

== Career ==
Liu was a leader of the Southern Society (Nanshe), founded in 1909 in Suzhou, Jiangsu, just north of Shanghai. During the last years of the Qing dynasty Liu and his associates advocated use of Wu Chinese, rather than Mandarin Chinese and wrote poetry in classical forms using Classical Chinese. They supported the Tongmenghui of Sun Yat-sen and opposed the Manchu government. After the Revolution of 1911, Liu became a committed journalist and activist in opposition to Yuan Shikai. The Southern Society, whose national members numbered in the thousands, with Liu as its head continued its activities during the anti-traditional New Culture Movement. The Society broke up in the early 1920s as Liu came to support the position of Hu Shih that literature should be written in the vernacular language.

Liu went to Canton in 1923 to join the Kuomintang in 1923, but soon became resentful of the leadership of Chiang Kai-shek and in 1927 fled to Japan to escape repression. In 1932, however, he was re-elected to the GMD Central Supervisory Committee and was appointed to a position in the Shanghai City Government.

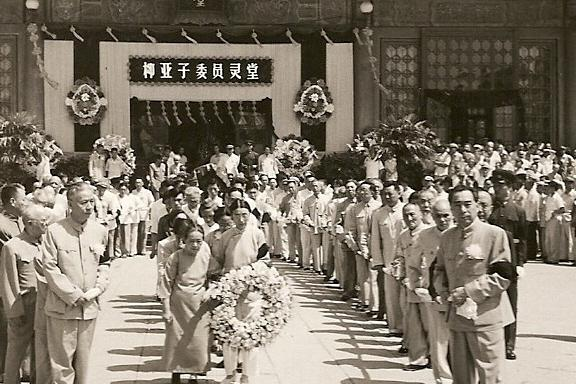
Liu Yazi's funeral, with Liu Shaoqi to the left and Zhou Enlai to the right. The old lady in the middle of front row was his wife Zheng Peiyi

In the 1930s, Liu continued to be a prolific writer and poet, still preferring the classical forms. After the outbreak of the Second Sino-Japanese War in 1937, Liu initially remained in Shanghai, but fled first to Hong Kong, then in 1941 to Guilin, and for the last years of the war to China's wartime capital, Chongqing. He became a member of the China Democratic League, which supported neither the GMD nor the Communists. Liu had met Mao Zedong in Canton in the 1920s and discussed their preference for traditional strict classical forms. When Mao arrived in Chongqing to begin direct negotiations with Chiang Kai-shek, he presented Liu with one of his most well-known poems, "Snow," for Liu to publish. Mao later wrote poems, "For Mr. Liu Yazi," dated 1949 and October 1950.

After the war Shanghai did not seem safe, so Liu fled once again to Hong Kong, where he continued his anti-GMD activities. In 1949 he moved to Beijing. He was a member of the Standing Committee of the National People's Congress from 1954 to 1958, but died of pneumonia in 1958. He was buried the in Babaoshan Revolutionary Cemetery.

== See also ==
- Gao Xu
