= South Society =

Literature and poetry organization

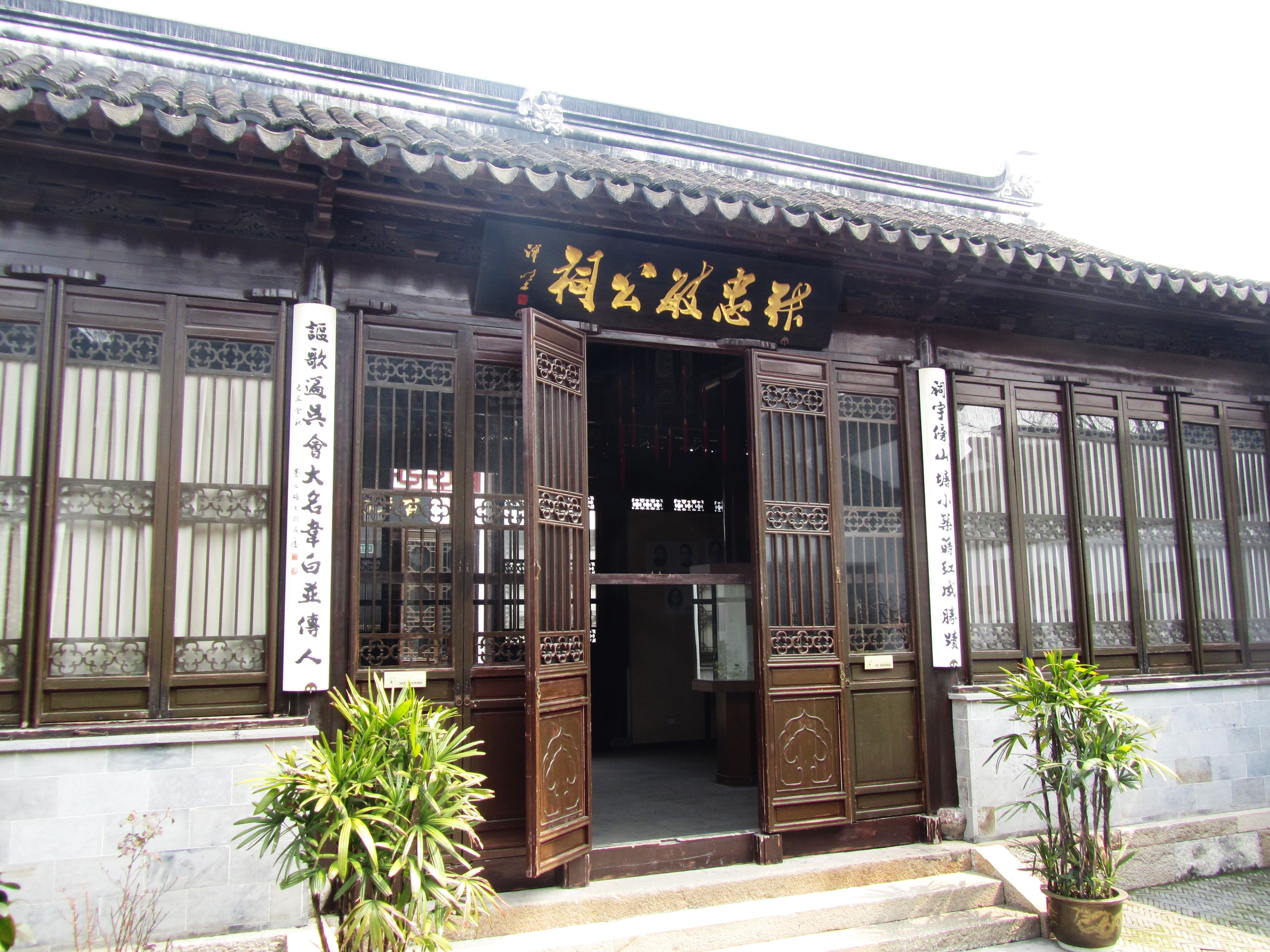
The Memorial temple of Zhang Guowei in Suzhou, the founding site of the South Society

The South Society (sometimes translated as Southern Society or Nan Society. Chinese: 南社, Pinyin: Nán Shè) was the largest literature and poetry organization during the late Qing dynasty China and the early period of Republican China.

== History ==
The society was founded on November 13, 1909, in Suzhou, Jiangsu Province. The name of the society was from the phrase “操南音，不忘其旧” (speak Wu dialect, not to forget the tradition). The founding members were all from the Tongmenghui, an influential revolutionary organization during the late-Qing era. Chen Qubing (陳去病, 1874–1933, a native from Suzhou), Gao Xu (高旭, 1877－1925, a native from current Shanghai Jinshan District), and Liu Yazi (柳亞子, 1887－1958, a native of Suzhou) were three founding fathers of society.

The society had many branches in different cities in China especially in Yangtze River Delta region, such as Shanghai, Nanjing, Hangzhou, Shaoxing. The society also expended to Guangzhou (the capital city of Guangdong Province) and Shenyang (the capital city of Liaoning province). It had 1180 members in 1911. The society had its own press and a series of publications.

The society was dissociated in 1923 for the first time. Its activities were remained until 1940s.

== Objective and Mission ==
First, the society advocates the revolution, and the purpose is to use the "recovery" of the Han people as a means. Secondly, the South Society not only distinguishes the ethnic differences between China, but also emphasizes the need for profound changes in political, social, and cultural systems. Third, they hope to use literature to achieve the purpose of "communicating" with the people and use the power of literature to promote the anti-manchurian revolution. Finally, in order to encourage anti-manual feelings, the approach of the South Society is to directly challenge the Qing court's long-standing imprisonment and threats to the text, actively compile the documents of various literary prisoners in the early Qing dynasty, and even adopt public ceremonies to awaken the racial hatred of the Han Chinese. At that time, the activities of the South Society were almost astonishing in China. Probably, except for a small number of students studying in Japan, they did not see such a large scale. Because of this, the influence of the South Society has been expanding. Similar associations have been established in Zhejiang, Liaoning, Guangdong and Jiangsu.

== Political activities ==
The society was closely involved in many political movements, especially those anti-Qing dynasty and then anti-Yuan Shikai movements.

The society also maintained close ties with organizations in Japan and Korea.

== See also ==
- League of the Left-Wing Writers
