= Kao (crater) =

Crater on the Moon

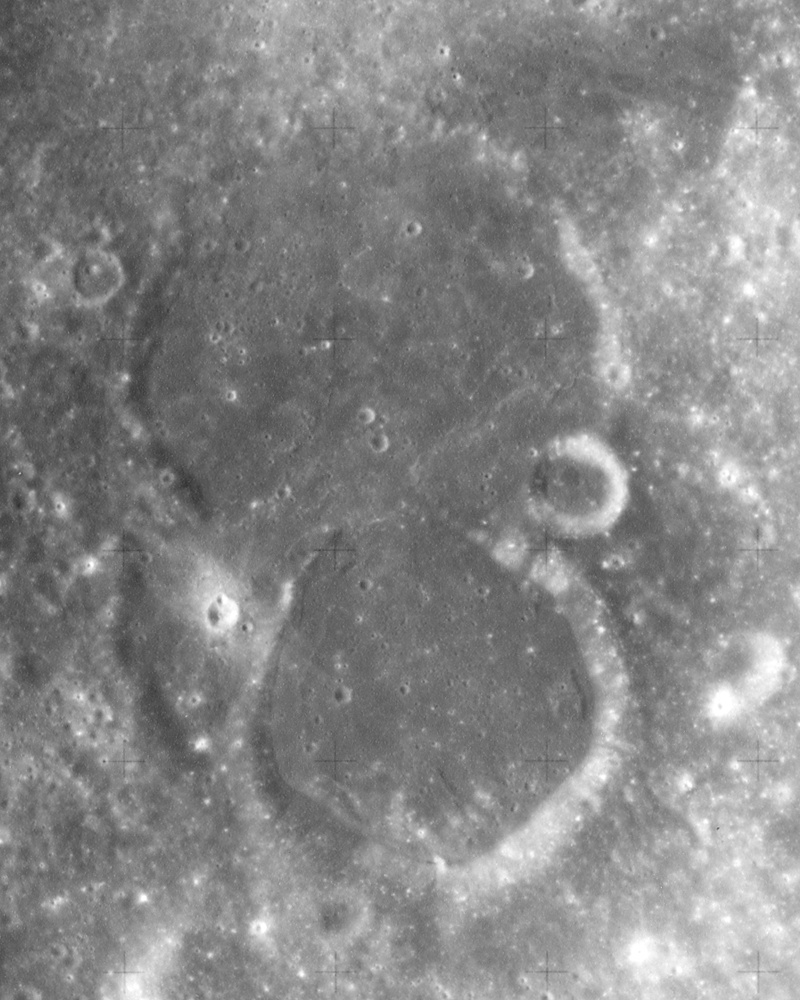
- Apollo 17 mapping camera image, Kao at top and Helmert at bottom
- Coordinates: 6.71°S 87.81°E
- Diameter: 34.54 km
- Depth: 0.43 km
- Colongitude: 273° at sunrise
- Eponym: Ping-Tse Kao

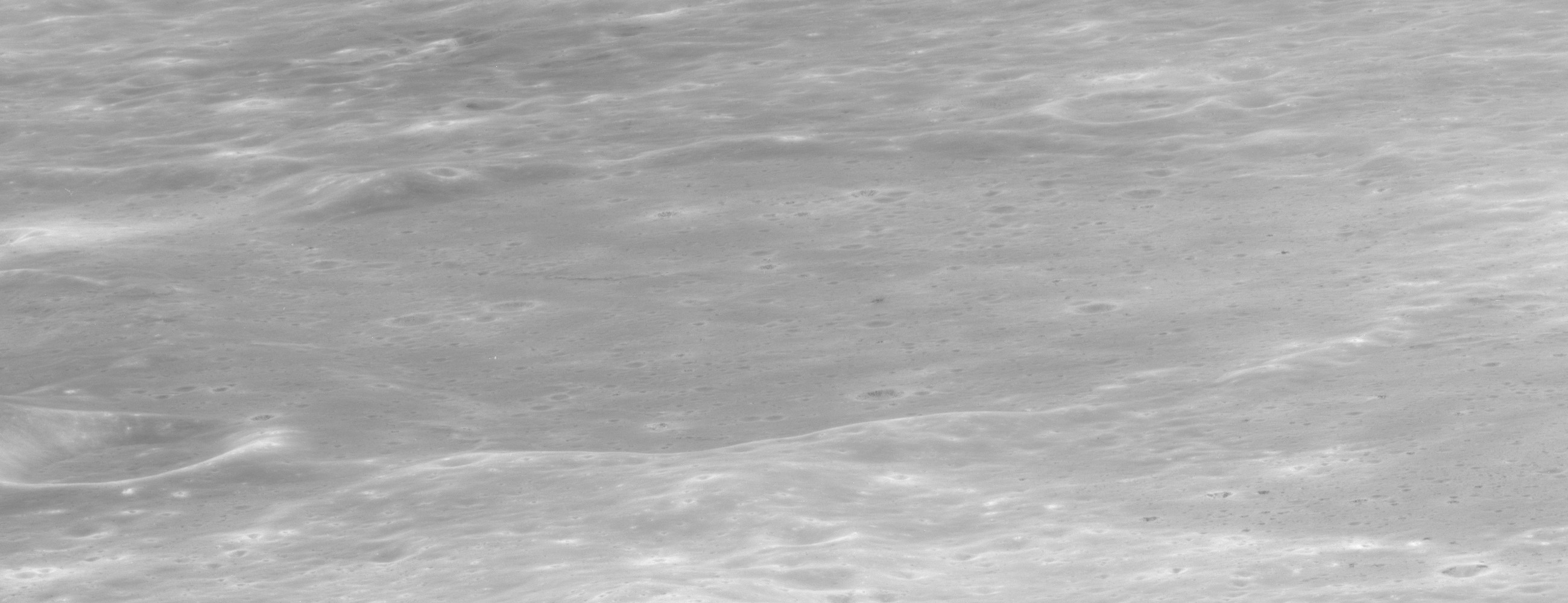
Oblique view from Apollo 17

Kao is a small lunar impact crater that is located near the eastern limb of the Moon. It lies near the southern edge of the Mare Smythii, a lunar mare that continues onto the far side of the surface. This crater lies to the east-southeast of the crater Widmannstätten. Less than a crater diameter to the north-northeast is the small crater Tucker.

This crater forms part of a merged pair with Helmert to the south. There is a gap in the sides of the crater where they are joined, and they share a common floor that has been resurfaced by lava. The outer rim of this crater now forms little more than a shallow ring in the surface, with the rim lowest along the northern side. It is unmarked by impacts of significance. However, there is a small crater along the southeastern edge where the rim joins that of Helmert.

The crater's name was approved by the IAU in 1982. It is named for astronomer Kao Ping-tse.
