= Věnceslava =

Věnceslava or Vjenceslava is a Czech feminine given name. The male version of name is Václav meaning more glory. Pronounced vyehn-ses-lah-vah. Věnka means crown in a modern Czech language.

The Czech name day is 13 February. Derived nicknames include: Vjenka, Vjena, Vjenuška, Slávka, Venca, Vendy

== Notable people ==
- Věnceslava Hrdličková (1924–2016), Czech sinologist and historian
- Věnceslava Hrubá-Freiberger (born 1945), Czech-German soprano

== Other variants ==
- Venceslava - Serbo-Croatian, Bulgarian, Russian
- Wienczysława - Polish
- Vienka - English
