= Shrine of Living Buddha =

Buddhist temple in Anhui, China

- 肉身宝殿
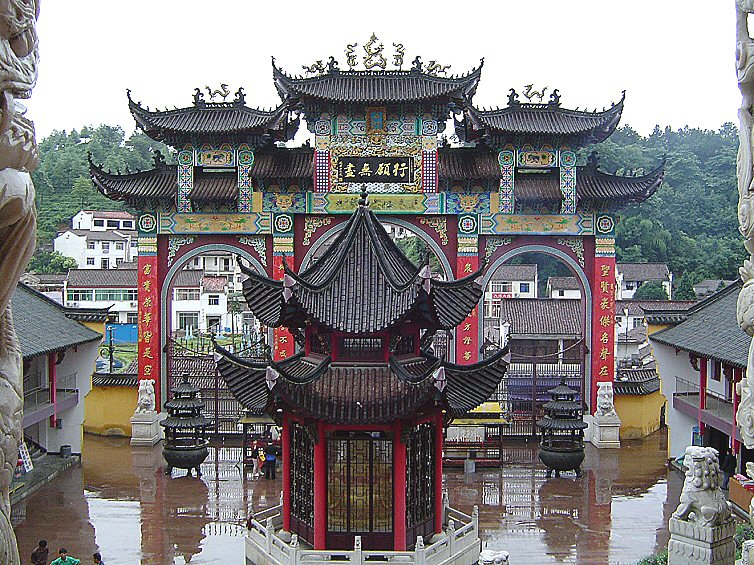
- The entrance.

Religion
- Affiliation: Buddhism

Location
- Location: Mount Jiuhua, Qingyang County, Anhui
- Country: China
- Interactive map of Shrine of Living Buddha
- Coordinates: 30°28′56″N 117°48′11″E

Architecture
- Style: Chinese architecture
- Established: 8th century

The Shrine of Living Buddha (simplified Chinese: 肉身宝殿; traditional Chinese: 肉身寶殿; pinyin: Ròushēn Bǎodiàn) is a Buddhist temple located at the Divine Light Summit (神光岭) of Mount Jiuhua, in Qingyang County, Anhui, China.

== History ==
=== Tang dynasty ===
During the early 8th century, Silla prince Kim Gyo-gak came to Tang Empire to practice sutra and he chose a cave on Mount Jiuhua for his self-cultivation. In 794, in the 10th year of Zhenyuan period, Kim Gyo-gak died, aged 99. His body was founded in the cave three years later, he still had life-like color and soft skin. Monks believed that he was the reincarnation of Kṣitigarbha, so they built a stone pagoda to house his body and named it "Golden Kṣitigarbha" (金地藏). Later a temple was established on the spacious foundation of the pagoda and was named the "Body Hall" (肉身宝殿).

=== Ming dynasty ===
In the Wanli period (1573–1620) of the Ming dynasty (1368–1644), the emperor issued the decree rebuilding the Body Hall and inscribed the wooden plaque with Chinese characters "Huguo Roushen Baota" (护国肉身宝塔; 'Protecting Country Pagoda of Living Buddha').

=== Qing dynasty ===
In the reign of Kangxi Emperor (1661–1722) of the Qing dynasty (1644–1911), Yu Chenglong (喻成龙) refurbished the halls of the temple. In 1857, during the Xianfeng era (1851–1861), part of the temple was destroyed by wars. In the early Tongzhi period (1862–1874), a flood destroyed some halls of the temple. In 1886, in the 12th year of Guangxi period (1875–1908), the temple was restored by monks.

=== Republic of China ===
After the Xinhai Revolution in 1914, the temple was renovated. In 1917, a plaque with "地藏大愿" (great vow of Kṣitigarbha) written by the then President of the Republic of China Li Yuanhong was hung on the architrave.

=== People's Republic of China ===
After the founding of the Communist State, the temple was rebuilt two times in 1955 and 1981. In 1983, the temple was designated as a National Key Buddhist Temple in Han Chinese Area by the State Council of China.

== Architecture ==
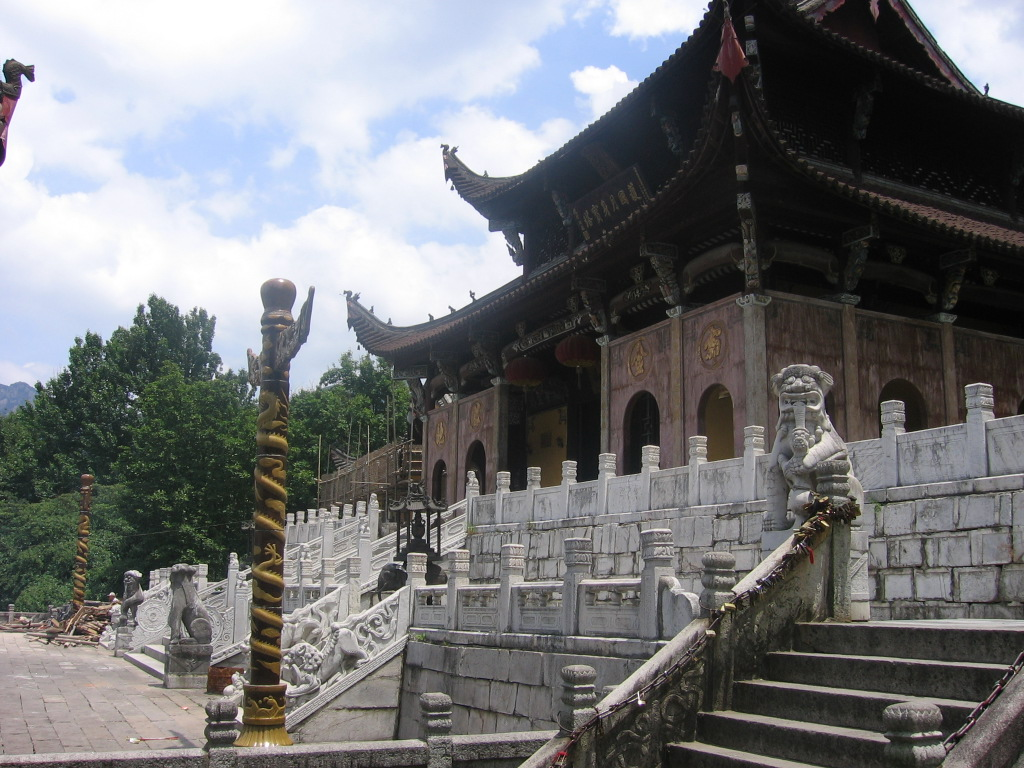
The Body Hall.

=== The Body Hall ===
The Body Hall has a pagoda architecture built with stone pillars, red walls, iron tiles and a paved floor of white marble tiles. In the center of the eaves of the hall is a plaque, on which there are the words "The First Mountain in Southeastern China" (东南第一山).

In the central part of the hall is the seven-story wooden pagoda of Kṣitigarbha with a white marble tile base. Over 100 little statues of Kṣitigarbha are enshrined inside of the pagoda. The gold statue of Kṣitigarbha is surrounded by many different sizes of Buddha along with Ten Kings of Hell.
