= Diting =

Mythical animal in Chinese Buddhism

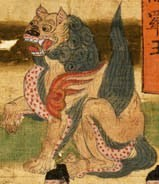
Diting

Diting (Chinese: 谛听; pinyin: Dìtīng; Vietnamese: Đế Thính) is a divine mythical creature and the steed of bodhisattva Kṣitigarbha in Chinese Buddhism. One interpretation of its single horn was that it could receive information across the universe. It could also be used to attack and defend. Its hound ears were like a universal radio, transmitting the ability to distinguish good from bad to all believers.

== Body ==
The Diting combines the feature of many beasts in one body: head of a tiger, body of a dragon, tail of a lion, one horn, ears like a dog and foot like a qilin.

== Legend ==
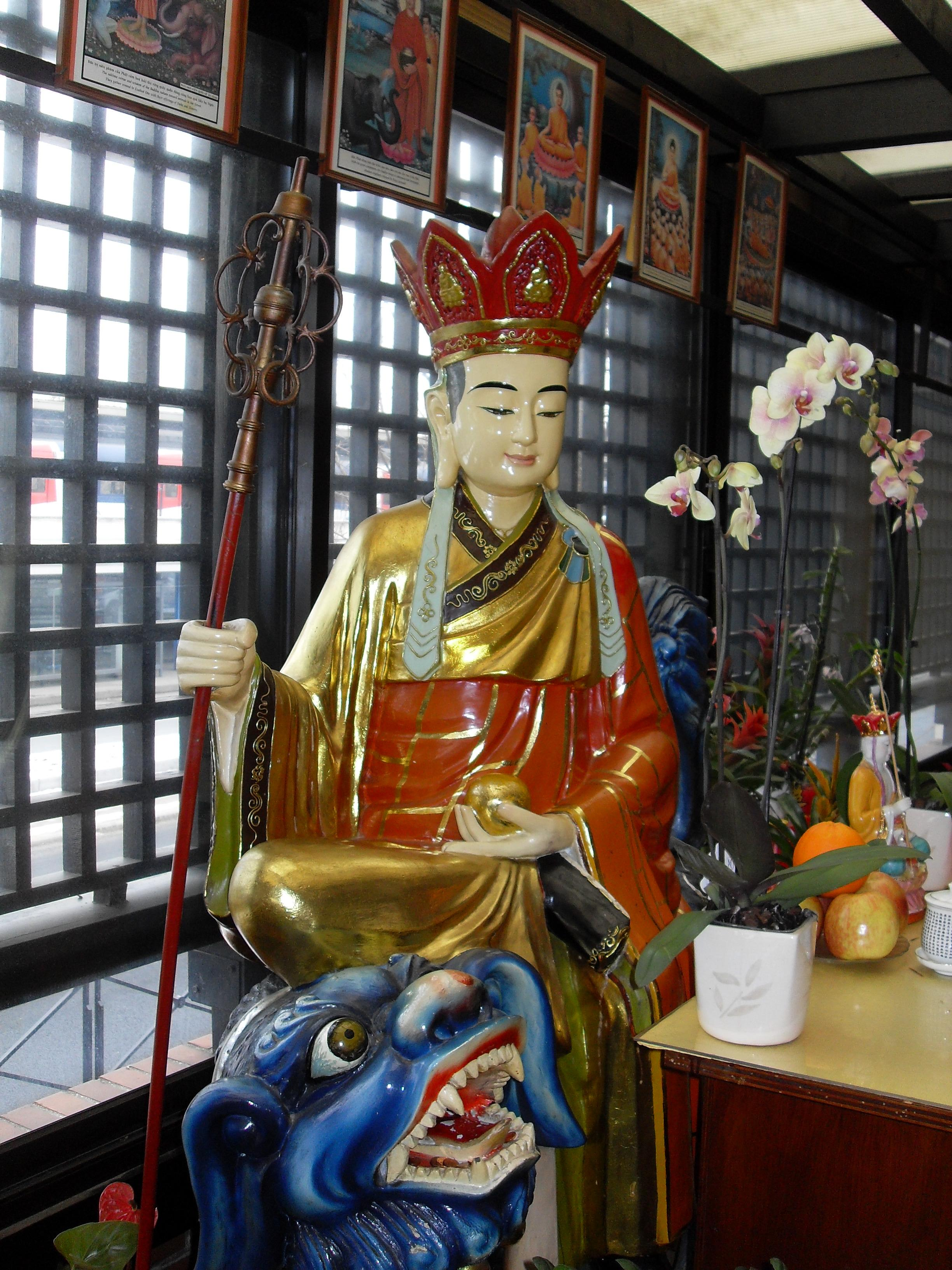
Kṣitigarbha on his mount Diting

Legend has it that Diting is actually a white dog. In some tales, before Kṣitigarbha left Heaven to assume his new life as a monk, he found that his mother from his past life would be reborn as a dog. Then Ksitigarbha was reincarnated into the human world as Kim Gyo-gak, a prince of Silla. When he grew up, he traced the dog and adopted, which then became his companion.

Kim Gyo-gak had studied in Tang China in his early life. After going back, he decided to give up his life in the royal family to be a monk and then left to Mount Jiuhua with his dog. He became a monk under the Chinese name Dizang "Kṣitigarbha". The dog followed the dharma as well and often acted as Ksitigarbha's guard. When Kṣitigarbha became enlightened, the dog became Diting who guards hell.

In Journey to the West, when Sun Wukong was arguing with the fake Sun Wukong, they went to Diyu to seek help. Ksitigarbha referred the monkeys to his steed Diting, given the latter's ability to differentiate all creatures in the world. Diting was able to distinguish the true monkey, but he knew the fake monkey will wreak havoc in his abode once exposed, so he asked Ksitigarbha to send the duo to Buddha instead.

== Depiction in media works ==
- Diting appears in the Chinese manhua and animated series Fabulous Beasts (有兽焉), as the chief executive officer of the Underworld and the Underworld's Goods and Shipping, brother to the clay-borne hellhound Qinghuo, and father to the skeleton cat Kulou. Millennia prior to the series, he was a white dog who had lost his owner. After accepting Ksitigarbha's request to be his new companion, he was resurrected in the underworld with a blue horn and gold irises. While living in the Underworld, his sclera and fur turned black over time, with the white fur that remained forming the skeleton ribcage and spine of a wolf. He wears different attires in his anthro form. His human form is only shown in the show's sister series, Fei Ren Zai. In the show, his birthday falls on the day of the Ghost Festival.
