= Dublovice =

- Municipality
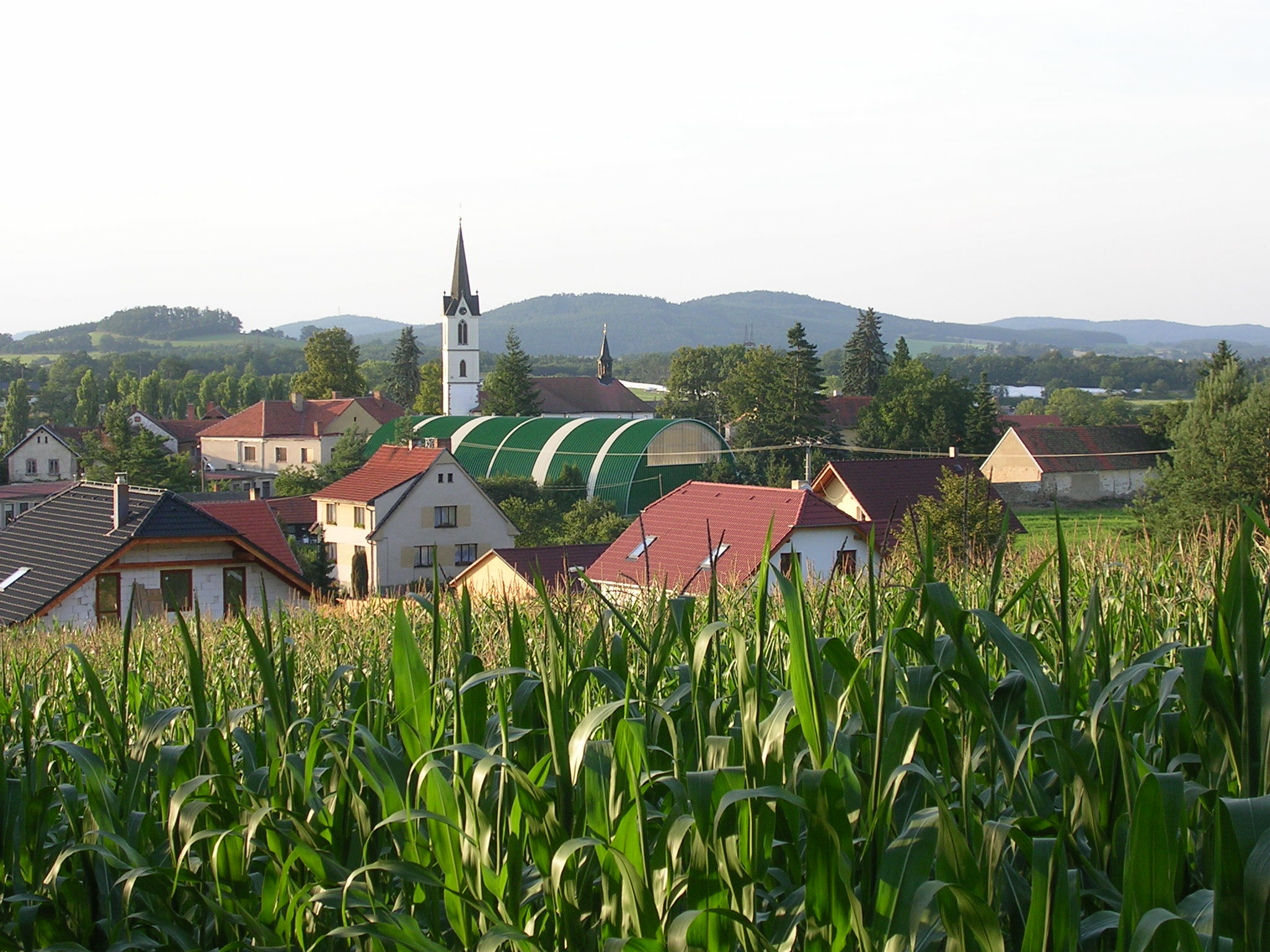
- View from the south

- Coat of arms

- Location in the Czech Republic
- Coordinates: 49°40′19″N 14°21′39″E
- Country: Czech Republic
- Region: Central Bohemian
- District: Příbram
- First mentioned: 1227

Area
  - Total: 25.14 km^{2} (9.71 sq mi)
- Elevation: 373 m (1,224 ft)

Population (2026-01-01)
  - Total: 1,094
  - Density: 43.52/km^{2} (112.7/sq mi)
- Time zone: UTC+1 (CET)
  - Summer (DST): UTC+2 (CEST)
- Postal code: 262 51, 264 01
- Website: www.dublovice.cz

Dublovice is a municipality and village in Příbram District in the Central Bohemian Region of the Czech Republic. It has about 1,100 inhabitants.

== Administrative division ==
Dublovice consists of five municipal parts (in brackets population according to the 2021 census):

- Dublovice (647)
- Břekova Lhota (39)
- Chramosty (99)
- Líchovy (111)
- Zvírotice (166)

== Etymology ==
The initial name of Dublovice was Dúdlebci, meaning "people from Dúdleby". During the 14th century, the name evolved from Dúdlebci to Dúdlebice and then to Dublovice.

== Geography ==
Dublovice is located about 25 kilometres (16 mi) east of Příbram and 38 km (24 mi) south of Prague. It lies in the Benešov Uplands. The highest point is the hill Lipina at 471 m (1,545 ft) above sea level. The area is rich in fishponds. In the northwest, the municipal border is formed by the Slapy Reservoir, built on the Vltava River.

== History ==
The first written mention of Dublovice is from 1228, when the village was donated to the St. George's Convent in Prague. From 1326 to the second half of the 15th century, most of the area was owned by the Rosenberg family. The Rosenbergs were then forced to sell it to the Lobkowicz family because of debts. From 1580 to 1604, Dublovice was property of Jakub Krčín, then the village returned to the Lobkowicz family.

== Demographics ==
Historical population

Year	Pop.	±%
1869	1,474	—
1880	1,538	+4.3%
1890	1,687	+9.7%
1900	1,680	−0.4%
1910	1,601	−4.7%

Year	Pop.	±%
1921	1,502	−6.2%
1930	1,472	−2.0%
1950	1,179	−19.9%
1961	1,128	−4.3%
1970	1,052	−6.7%

Year	Pop.	±%
1980	1,045	−0.7%
1991	1,011	−3.3%
2001	994	−1.7%
2011	1,049	+5.5%
2021	1,062	+1.2%

Source: Censuses

== Transport ==
The I/18 road (the section from Příbram to Sedlčany) runs through the municipality.

== Sights ==
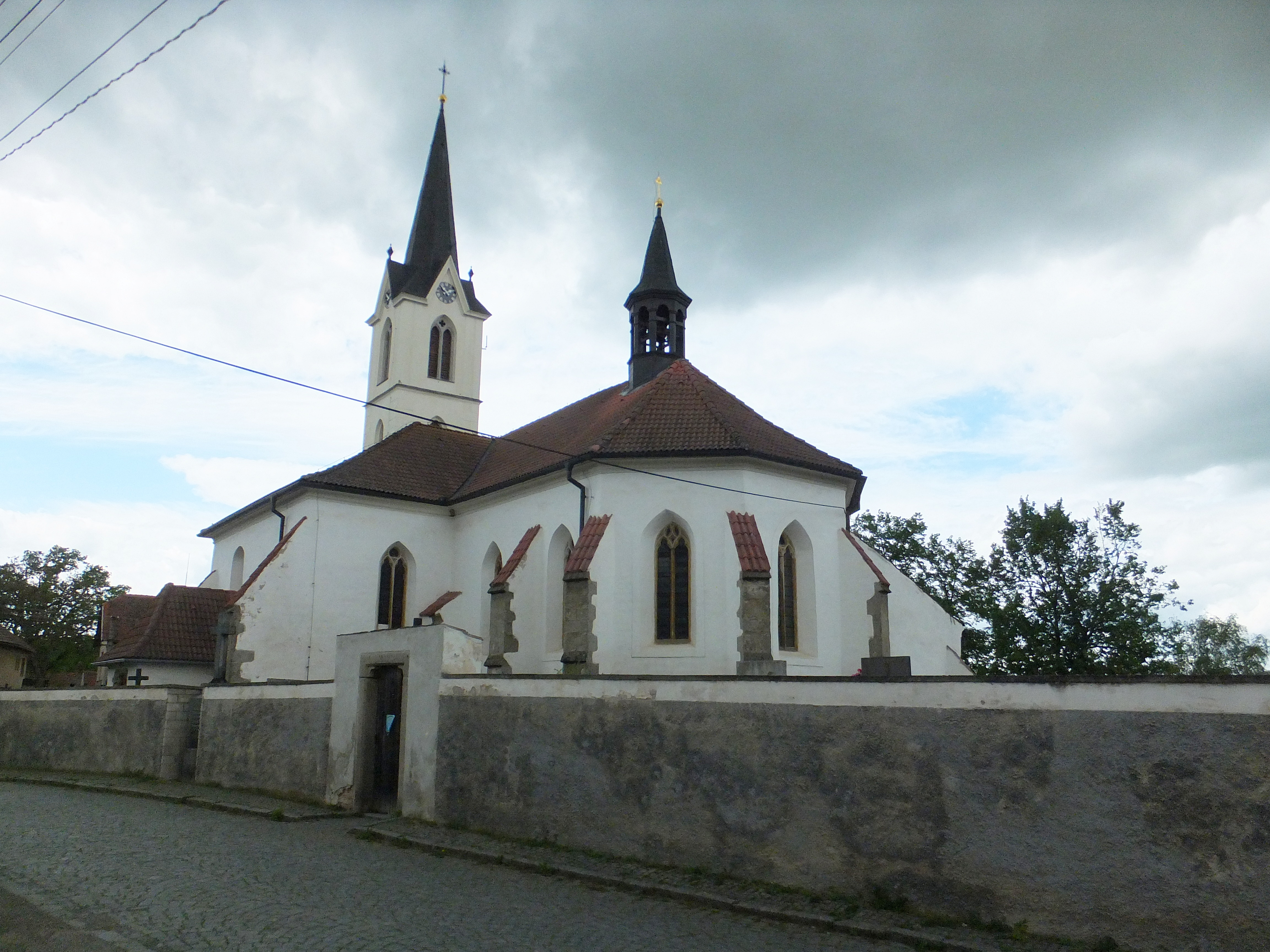
Church of the Holy Trinity

The main landmark of Dublovice is the Church of the Holy Trinity. It was built in several medieval phases. The current form of the church is the result of the modifications from the 19th century.

== Notable people ==
- Věnceslava Hrubá-Freiberger (born 1945), Czech-German soprano
