= Ōoka Tadasuke =

Japanese samurai (1677–1752)

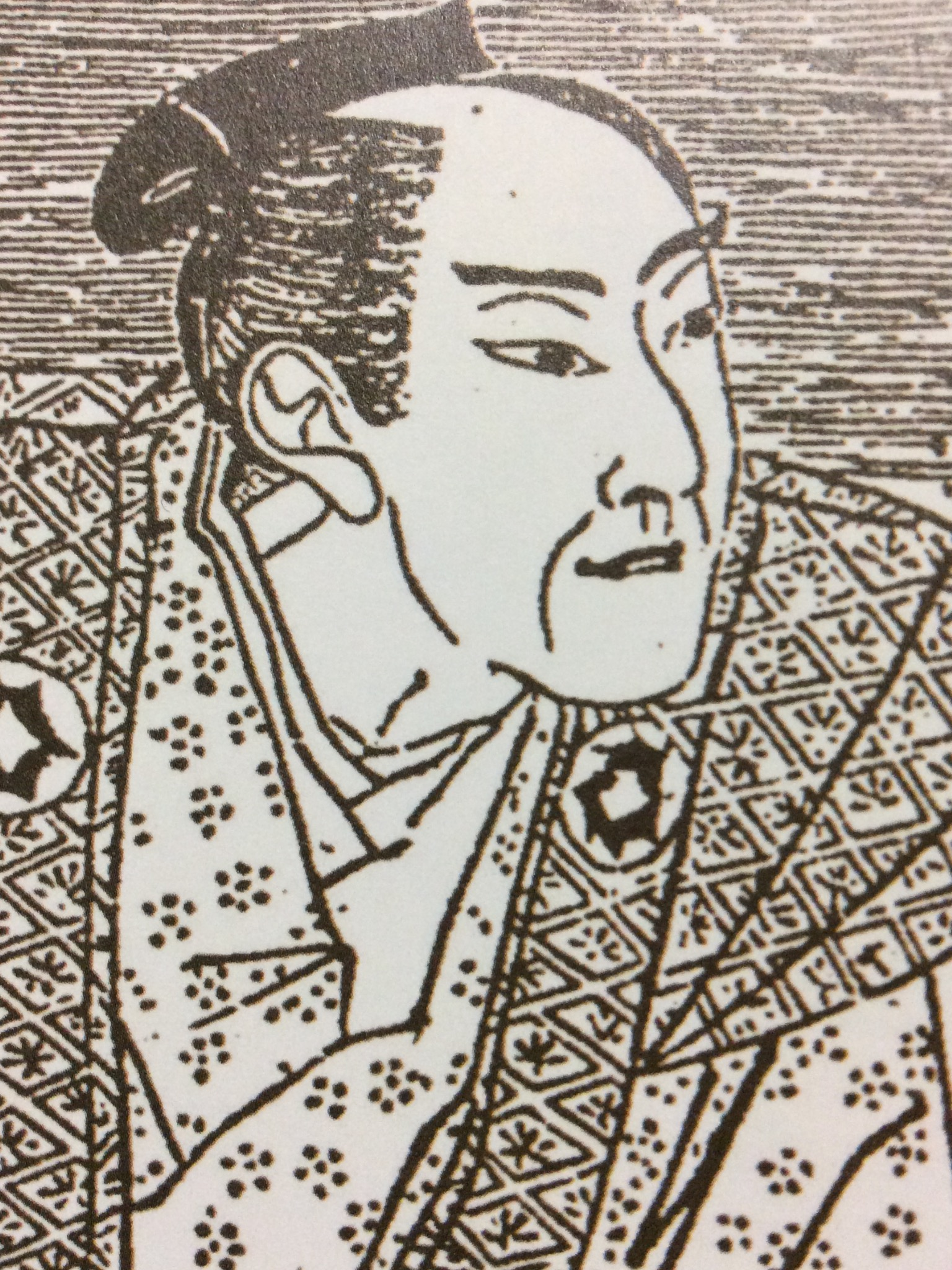
Ōoka Tadasuke

Ōoka Tadasuke (Japanese: 大岡 忠相; 1677 – 3 February 1752) was a Japanese samurai in the service of the Tokugawa shogunate. During the reign of Tokugawa Yoshimune, as a magistrate (machi-bugyō) of Edo, his roles included chief of police, judge and jury, and Yamada Magistrate (Yamada bugyō) prior to his tenure as South Magistrate (Minami Machi-bugyō) of Edo. With the title Echizen no Kami (Governor of Echizen or Lord of the Echizen), he is often known as Ōoka Echizen (大岡越前). He was highly respected as an incorruptible judge. In addition, he established the first fire brigade made up of commoners, and the Koishikawa Yojosho (a city hospital). Later, he advanced to the position of jisha bugyō, and subsequently became daimyō of the Nishi-Ōhira Domain.

Ōoka was born in 1677, but did not come into public notice until he was 35, when he was appointed an obscure judgeship. When he accepted this job, he found out that there was a long-standing boundary dispute between the farmers of the Yamada and Wakayama (Kishū) fiefs, which is also known as the "Case of the Inherited Rice Fields." While it was obvious that the Yamada claim was the just one, no previous judge had been foolish enough to irritate Yoshimune, Lord of Kishū, as he was very close to the shōgun, Tokugawa Ietsugu. However, Ōoka took up the case, and immediately settled it on its merits.

According to the story, the dispute began in the early 18th century when the lord of the Wakayama domain granted some rice fields to a group of farmers in the Yamada region. However, the grant was ambiguous, and there was confusion over the exact boundaries of the fields and who had the right to use them. The dispute continued for several generations, and the farmers of both regions became embroiled in bitter arguments and legal battles.

When Ōoka Tadasuke was appointed as the magistrate of the region, he was tasked with resolving the dispute once and for all. After carefully studying the case and listening to the arguments of both sides, Ōoka came up with a unique solution that satisfied everyone.

He ordered the farmers of both Yamada and Wakayama to plant their rice fields with red beans instead of rice. He then declared that whichever side produced a better harvest of red beans would be declared the rightful owners of the disputed rice fields.

The farmers of Yamada were known for their skills in growing rice and were initially confident that they would win the competition. However, the farmers of Wakayama had secretly been growing red beans for generations and had perfected their cultivation techniques. As a result, they were able to produce a much larger and healthier crop of red beans than the farmers of Yamada.

When the final harvest was taken, Ōoka Tadasuke declared that the farmers of Wakayama had proven their superior farming skills and deserved to be the rightful owners of the disputed rice fields. The decision was accepted by both sides, and the long-standing dispute was finally resolved.

Yoshimune was so impressed that when he became shōgun five years later, he took the unusual action of promoting Ōoka over hundreds of other candidates, to the important post of machi-bugyō (magistrate) of Edo (old name for Tokyo). The post of machi-bugyō combined the duties of mayor, police chief, judge, and fire marshal.

The city of Chigasaki in Kanagawa Prefecture has a festival for Ōoka in late April.

== Famous cases ==
In addition, the figure has taken on a legendary status in a number of stories about his unorthodox and wise legal decisions, frequently used in rakugo (Japanese storytelling).

One of the most famous stories is called "The Case of the Stolen Smell": A poor student would eat a simple meal while the innkeeper was cooking, because the fumes of the innkeeper's food would make the student's meal more enjoyable. The paranoid innkeeper considered this stealing and demanded compensation but when the student refused, he took the matter to court. Although his colleagues advised Ōoka to throw the case out as ridiculous, he decided to hear it. The judge resolved the matter by ordering the student to pass the money he had in one hand to his other, and ruling that the price of the smell of food is the sound of money.

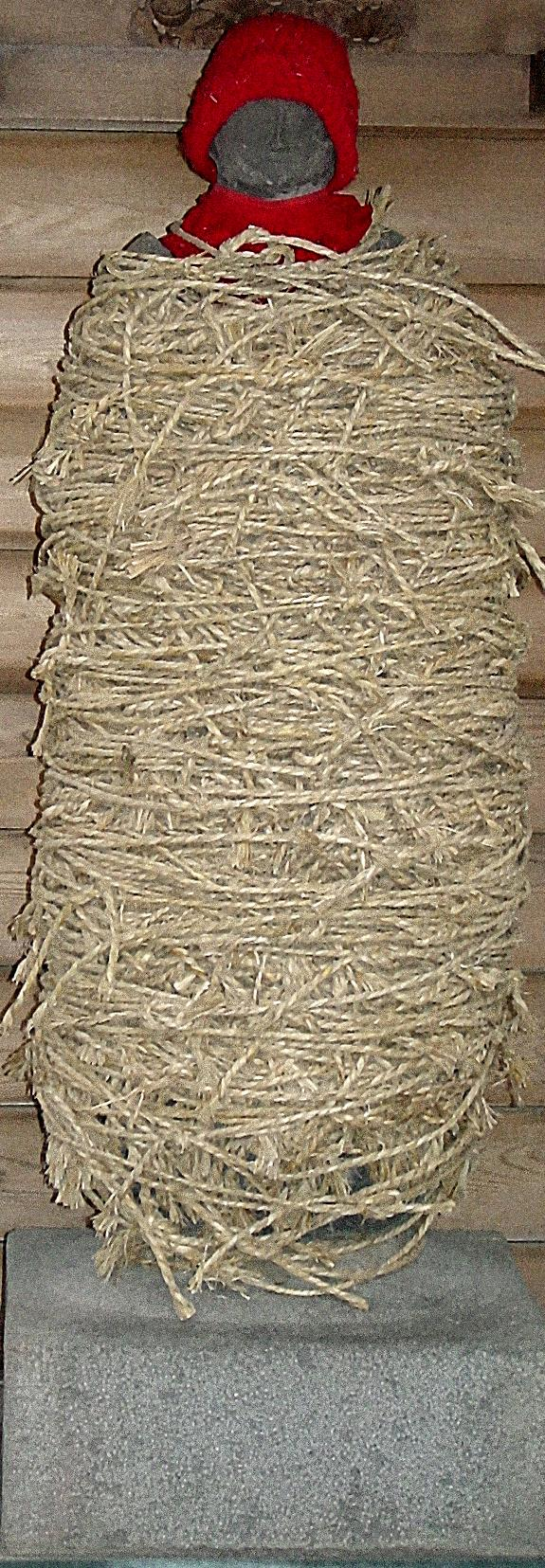
The bound statue of Jizō (Shibarare Jizō)

In "The Case of the Bound Jizō or Suspect Statue", Ōoka was called upon to discover the thief of a cartload of cloth from a local kimono maker. Ōoka ordered a statue of Jizō of the Narihira-san Tōsen-ji, a temple in Tokyo, to be bound and brought forth to be called to answer for dereliction of its custodial duty. When the bound statue arrived in the courtroom, the spectators burst into laughter. Ōoka sternly ordered each spectator to be punished with a token fine for their outburst: a small swatch of cloth. When the spectators paid their fines, the robbed kimono maker identified the piece of cloth from one spectator as identical to the cloth stolen in the crime. The spectator, who was the actual thief, was arrested, and Ōoka ordered the Jizō statue released as having discharged his duty. In 1925, the statue was removed from downtown Tokyo to a little temple called Nanjo-in on its outskirts. The statue still stands, and is wrapped in rope tied by hopeful victims of thieves. However, the statue is worn almost smooth because of over 200 years of binding.

== Ōoka in fiction ==
Ōoka Tadasuke has been the central character in two jidaigeki television series. In one, Ōoka Echizen, actor Gō Katō played the lead. In the other, Meibugyō! Ōoka Echizen, Kinya Kitaōji played the same role.

In addition, series such as Abarenbō Shōgun have portrayed Ōoka as an intimate of the shōgun Tokugawa Yoshimune. Ōoka was portrayed first by Tadashi Yokouchi and later by Ryo Tamura.

Other actors who portrayed Ōoka include Ichikawa Danjūrō XII in Honō no Bugyō Ōoka Echizen no Kami (Tokyo Broadcasting System, 1996) and Sakae Takita in the 1995 Taiga drama Hachidai Shogun Yoshimune.

He has been mentioned in the manga by Rumiko Takahashi, Ranma ½.

In 1984, Czechoslovak sino- and japanologist Věnceslava Hrdličková has published book Stories of Judge Ōoka. In 1988, this book was adapted by Brno studio of Czechoslovak Television into 62 minute TV fairytale called Rozsudky soudce Ooky (Judgements of Ōoka the Judge). Ōoka was portrayed by Miroslav Donutil.

Dutch author Bertus Aafjes wrote a five-book series of mystery novels featuring Ōoka.

Ōoka as well as one of his famous cases was portrayed in both the manga and anime adaptations of Kaguya-sama: Love Is War.

Ōoka is a major character in the Japanese tokusatsu series, Shiro Jishi Kamen (White Lion Mask).

=== English presentations ===
Stories of Ōoka began showing up in English in 1908, in "The Case of Ten-Ichi-Bo, a Cause Celebre in Japan" by W. J. S. Shand, published by the Tokyo Methodist Publishing House.

In 1956, an illustrated book was created by I.G. Edmonds, an American military officer. Published by the Pacific Stars & Stripes, it was called Solomon in Kimono: Tales of Ooka, a Wise Judge of Old Yedo. Edmonds' work was published in 1961 as Ooka the Wise, and then in 1966 renamed The Case of the Marble Monster and Other Stories and made widely available to American schoolchildren by the Scholastic publishing company.

Beginning in 1999, Judge Ōoka has appeared in the Samurai Detective series by Dorothy and Thomas Hoobler. Books include The Ghost in the Tokaido Inn (1999), The Demon in the Teahouse (2001), In Darkness, Death (2004; Edgar Award winner), The Sword That Cut the Burning Grass (2005), A Samurai Never Fears Death (2007), and Seven Paths To Death (2008).
