= Kṣitigarbha =

Bodhisattva

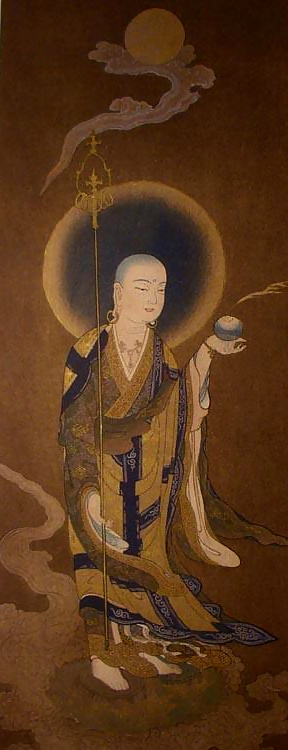
- Sanskrit: क्षितिगर्भ; IAST: Kṣitigarbha
- Chinese: 地藏菩萨, 地藏菩薩; Jyutping: Dei6 zong6 pou4 saat3; Pinyin: Dìzàng Púsà
- Japanese: じぞうぼさつ, 地藏菩薩; Romaji: Jizō Bosatsu
- Korean: 지장보살; RR: Jijang Bosal
- Mongolian: Газрын зүрхэн
- Russian: Кшитигарбха; ALA-LC: Kshitigarbkha
- Tagalog: Ksitigaba
- Thai: พระกษิติครรภโพธิสัตว์
- Tibetan: ས་ཡི་སྙིང་པོ་; THL: Sa Yi Nyingpo
- Vietnamese: Địa Tạng Bồ Tát

Information
- Venerated by: Mahāyāna, Vajrayāna

Kṣitigarbha (Sanskrit: क्षितिगर्भ, Chinese: 地藏; pinyin: Dìzàng; Japanese: 地蔵; rōmaji: Jizō; Korean: 지장 (地藏); romaja: Jijang; Vietnamese: Địa Tạng (地藏), Standard Tibetan: ས་ཡི་སྙིང་པོ་ Wylie: sa yi snying po) is a bodhisattva primarily revered in East Asian Buddhism and usually depicted as a Buddhist monk. His name may be translated as "Earth Treasury", "Earth Store", "Earth Matrix", or "Earth Womb". Kṣitigarbha is known for his vow to take responsibility for the instruction of all beings in the six worlds between the death of Gautama Buddha and the rise of Maitreya, as well as his vow not to achieve Buddhahood until all hells are emptied. He is therefore often regarded as the bodhisattva of hell-beings, as well as the guardian of children and patron deity of deceased children and aborted fetuses in Japanese culture.

Usually depicted as a monk with either a halo or a crown bearing images of the Five Tathāgatas around his shaved head, he carries a staff to force open the gates of hell and a wish-fulfilling jewel to light up the darkness.

== Overview ==
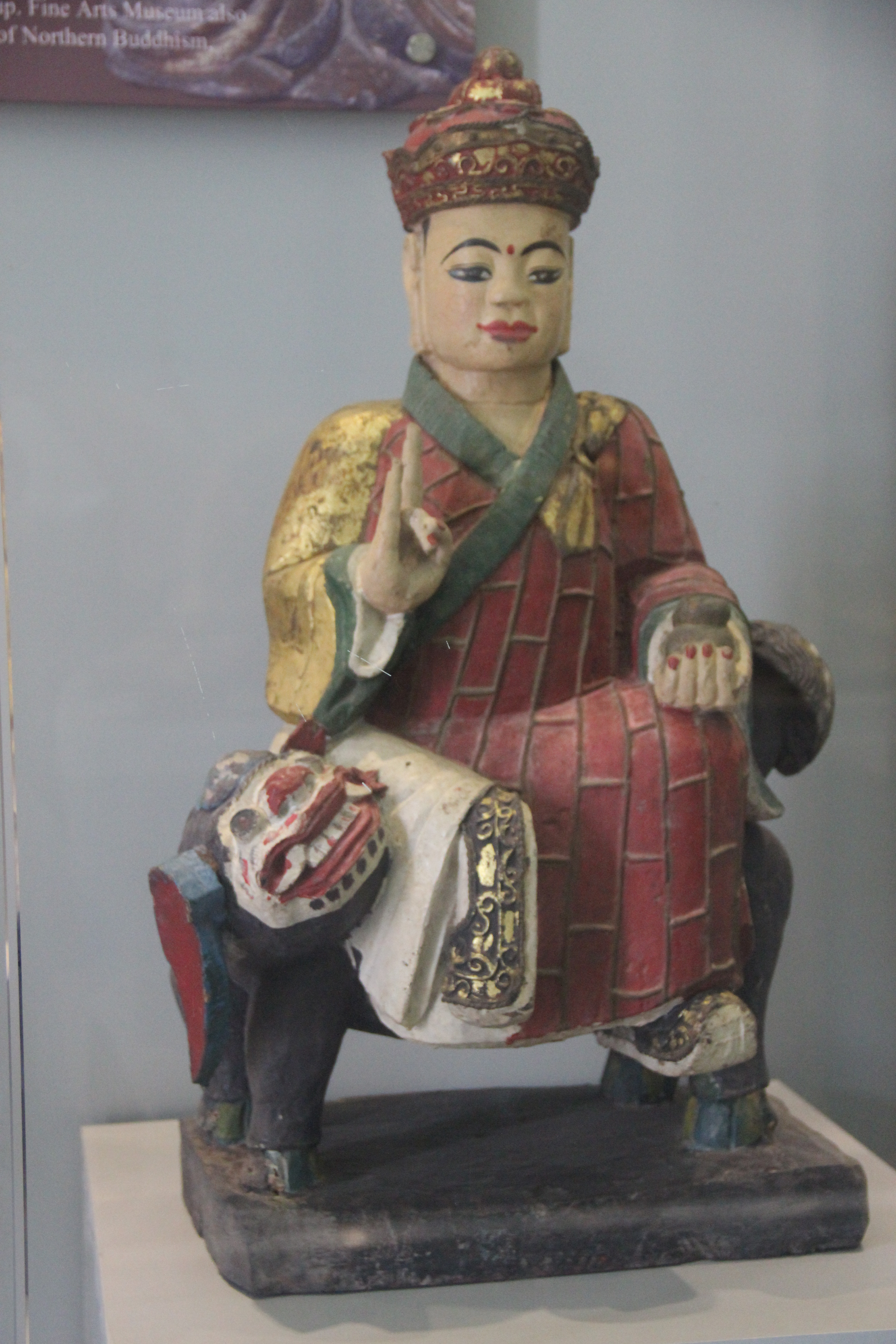
Ceramic statue of Kṣitigarbha in the Nguyễn dynasty, 19th century.

Kṣitigarbha is one of the four principal bodhisattvas along with Samantabhadra, Manjusri, and Avalokiteśvara (Guanyin) in East Asian Mahayana Buddhism.

At the pre-Tang dynasty grottos in Dunhuang and Longmen, he is depicted in a classical bodhisattva form. After the Tang, he became increasingly depicted as a monk carrying Buddhist prayer beads and a staff.

His full name in Chinese is Dayuan Dizang Pusa (Chinese: 大願地藏菩薩; pinyin: Dàyuàn Dìzàng Púsà), or "Kṣitigarbha Bodhisattva of the Great Vow," pronounced Daigan Jizō Bosatsu in Japanese, Jijang Bosal in Korean, Đại Nguyện Địa Tạng Vương Bồ Tát in Vietnamese. This name is a reference to his pledge, as recorded in the sutras, to take responsibility for the instruction of all beings in the six worlds in the era between the parinirvana of the Buddha and the rise of Maitreya. Because of this important role, shrines to Kṣitigarbha often occupy a central role in temples, especially within the memorial halls or mausoleums.

== Scriptural sources ==
=== As a Brahmin maiden ===
The story of Kṣitigarbha was first described in the Kṣitigarbha Bodhisattva Pūrvapraṇidhāna Sūtra, a popular Mahayana sutra. This sutra is said to have been spoken by the Buddha towards the end of his life to the beings of the Trāyastriṃśa Heaven as a mark of gratitude and remembrance for his beloved mother, Maya. The Kṣitigarbha Bodhisattva Pūrvapraṇidhāna Sūtra begins, "Thus have I heard. Once the Buddha was abiding in Trayastrimsas Heaven in order to expound the Dharma to his mother."

The Kṣitigarbha Bodhisattva Pūrvapraṇidhāna Sūtra was first translated from Sanskrit into Chinese between 695 and 700 CE, during the Tang dynasty, by the Tripiṭaka master Śikṣānanda, a Buddhist monk from Khotan who also provided a new translation of the Avataṃsaka Sūtra and the Laṅkāvatāra Sūtra. However, some scholars have suspected that instead of being translated, this text may have originated in China, since no Sanskrit manuscripts of this text have been found. Part of the reason for suspicion is that the text advocates filial piety, which was stereotypically associated with Chinese culture. It stated that Kṣitigarbha practised filial piety as a mortal, which eventually led to making great vows to save all sentient beings. Since then, other scholars such as Gregory Schopen have pointed out that Indian Buddhism also had traditions of filial piety. Currently there is no definitive evidence indicating either an Indian or Chinese origin for the text.

In the Kṣitigarbha Sūtra, the Buddha states that in the distant past eons, Kṣitigarbha was a maiden of the Brahmin caste by the name of Sacred Girl. This maiden was deeply troubled upon the death of her mother, who had often been slanderous towards the Three Jewels.

== Iconography ==
=== Traditional iconography ===
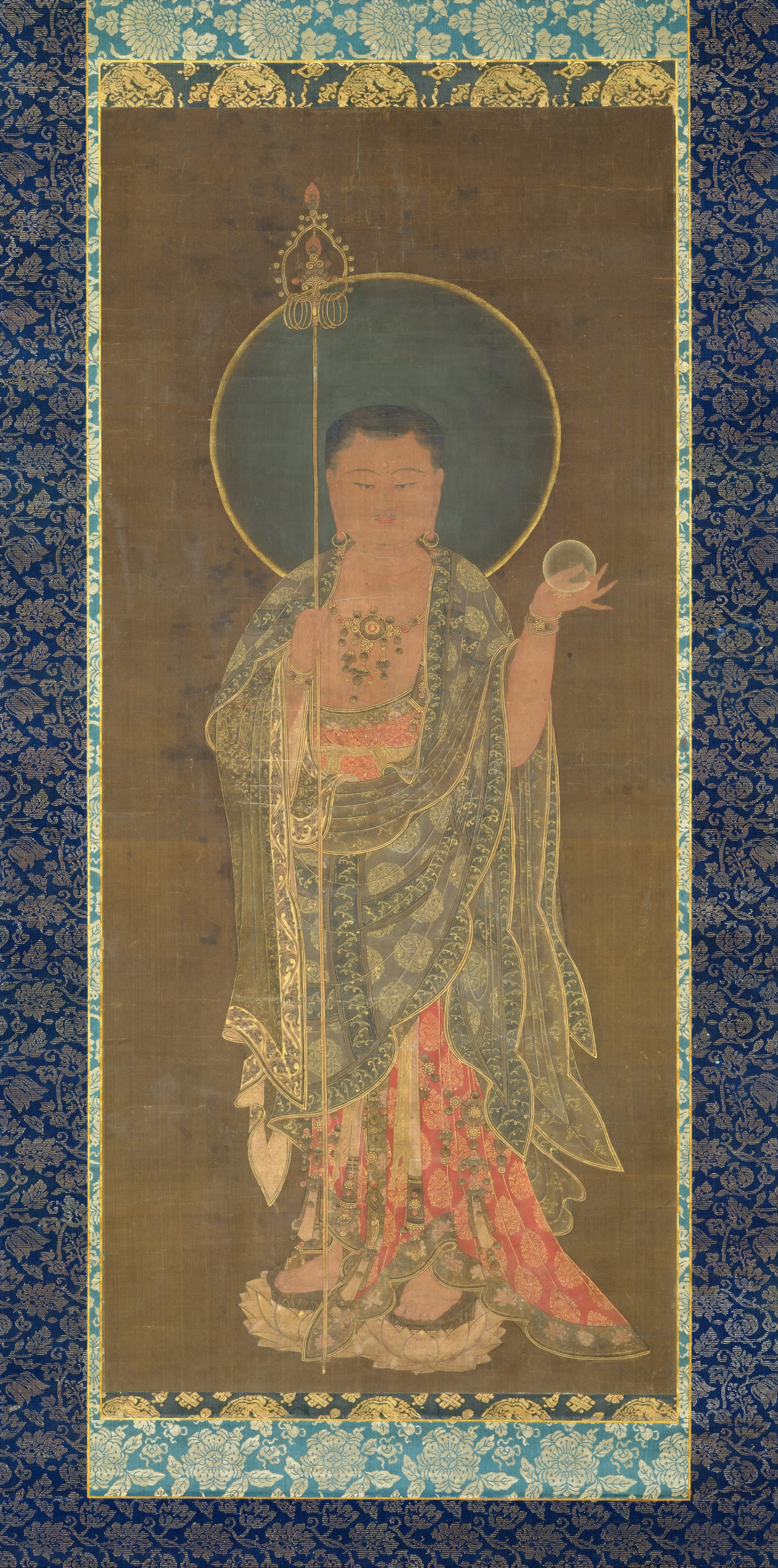
Kṣitigarbha painting, Goryeo, late 14th century.

In Buddhist iconography, Kṣitigarbha is typically depicted with a shaven head, dressed in a monk's simple robes (unlike most other bodhisattvas, who are dressed like Indian royalty).

In his left hand, Kṣitigarbha holds a tear-shaped jewel or cintamani (Chinese: 如意寶珠; pinyin: Rúyì bǎozhū; Japanese pronunciation: Nyoihōju), which is a wish-granting jewel that symbolizes enlightenment or salvation. In his right hand, he holds a Khakkhara (Chinese: 錫杖; pinyin: Xīzhàng; Japanese pronunciation: Shakujō), which is used to alert insects and small animals of his approach so that he will not accidentally harm them as well as to open the gates of Hell. This staff is traditionally carried by Buddhist monks. Like other bodhisattvas, Kṣitigarbha usually is seen standing on a lotus base, symbolizing his release from rebirth. Kṣitigarbha's face and head are also idealised, featuring the third eye, elongated ears and the other standard attributes of a buddha. He is frequently shown wearing a plain monk's robe and standing on a lotus base, reflecting purity and spiritual liberation.

In the Chinese tradition, Kṣitigarbha is often depicted wearing a Five Buddha crown (Chinese: 五佛冠, pinyin: Wǔfó Guān), which is a crown that bears the images of the Five Tathāgatas. His image is similar to that of the fictional character Tang Sanzang from the classical novel Journey to the West, so observers sometimes mistake Kṣitigarbha for the latter. In China, Kṣitigarbha is also sometimes accompanied by a dog. This is in reference to a legend that he found his mother reborn in the animal realm as a dog named Diting, which the Bodhisattva adopted to serve as his steed and guard.

In Japan, Kṣitigarbha's statues are often adorned with bibs, kerchiefs or kasa hat on his head, and sometimes dressed with a haori. Tōsen-ji in Katsushika, Tokyo, contains the "Bound Kṣitigarbha" of Ōoka Tadasuke fame, dating from the Edo period. When petitions are requested before Kṣitigarbha, the petitioner ties a rope about the statue. When the wish is granted, the petitioner unties the rope. At the new year, the ropes of the ungranted wishes are cut by the temple priest.

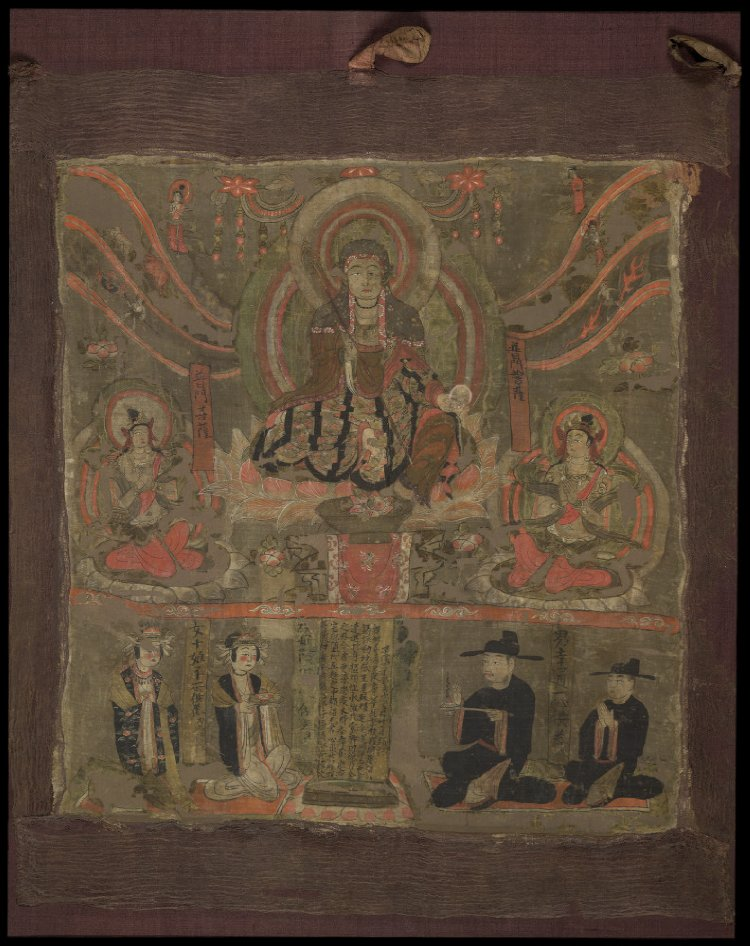
Painting of Kṣitigarbha as the Lord of the Six Ways from Mogao Grottoes in Dunhuang.

=== Kṣitigarbha as Lord of the Six Ways ===
Another category of iconographic depiction is Kṣitigarbha as the Lord of the Six Ways, an allegorical representation of the Six Paths of Rebirth of the Desire realm (rebirth into hell, or as pretas, animals, asuras, men, and devas). The Six Paths are often depicted as six rays or beams radiating from the bodhisattva and accompanied by figurative representations of the Six Paths. Many of these depictions in China can be found in Shaanxi province, perhaps a result of Sanjiejiao teachings in the area.

A Japanese variation of this depiction is the Six Kṣitigarbhas, six full sculptural manifestations of the bodhisattva. An example of this can be found in Konjikidō, the ‘Hall of Gold,’ in the Chūson-ji temple.

In some later East Asian and Vajrayāna traditions, Kṣitigarbha is also depicted with multiple arms (notably six), each holding symbolic implements associated with the salvation of beings in the six realms of rebirth. This form parallels other multi-armed bodhisattvas and reflects the doctrine of skillful means (upāya). Such representations can be found especially in Taiwan and Vietnam, in certain tantric contexts.

== In Buddhist traditions ==
=== Indian and Tibetan traditions ===
In the early Indian and Indo-Tibetan traditions, Kṣitigarbha (Sanskrit: क्षितिगर्भ, Tibetan:སའི་སྙིང་པོ / ས་ཡི་སྙིང་པོ, “Essence of the Earth”) is counted among the Eight Great Bodhisattvas (byang chub sems dpa’ chen po brgyad), together with Mañjuśrī, Avalokiteśvara, Vajrapāṇi, Samantabhadra, Ākāśagarbha, Maitreya and Sarvanīvaraṇaviṣkambin.

The cult of the Eight Great Bodhisattvas originated in India during the early development of Mahāyāna Buddhism and became especially popular in Central Asia and Tibet. One of the earliest surviving sources to describe their rituals and iconography is the Aṣṭamaṇḍalaka-sūtra, translated into Chinese by the esoteric master Amoghavajra (8th century). The Eight Bodhisattvas, each associated with one of the eight directions, were venerated both for spiritual blessings and for protection against disease, famine, and war. Beyond painted thangkas, images of the eight Bodhisattvas are also found on the walls of several Tibetan monasteries such as Iwang, Samding, Dolma, and Lakhang, attesting to the widespread popularity of their cult.

In the Nyingma tradition, particularly in the Longchen Nyingtik lineage, the Eight Great Bodhisattvas appear together around Śākyamuni Buddha in the Refuge Field (Tib. tshogs shing). This arrangement visually expresses their role as manifestations of enlightened compassion and as peaceful counterparts to the Eight Herukas of the Mahāyoga system.

In the Nyingma Mahāyoga system of Tibet, each of the Eight Great Bodhisattvas (aṣṭa mahāsattva) is considered to have a wrathful counterpart among the Eight Herukas (bka’ brgyad), the central meditational deities of the Eight Heruka mandalas. These Herukas represent the dynamic, transformative aspects of the same enlightened principles embodied in the peaceful Bodhisattvas of the Mahāyāna.

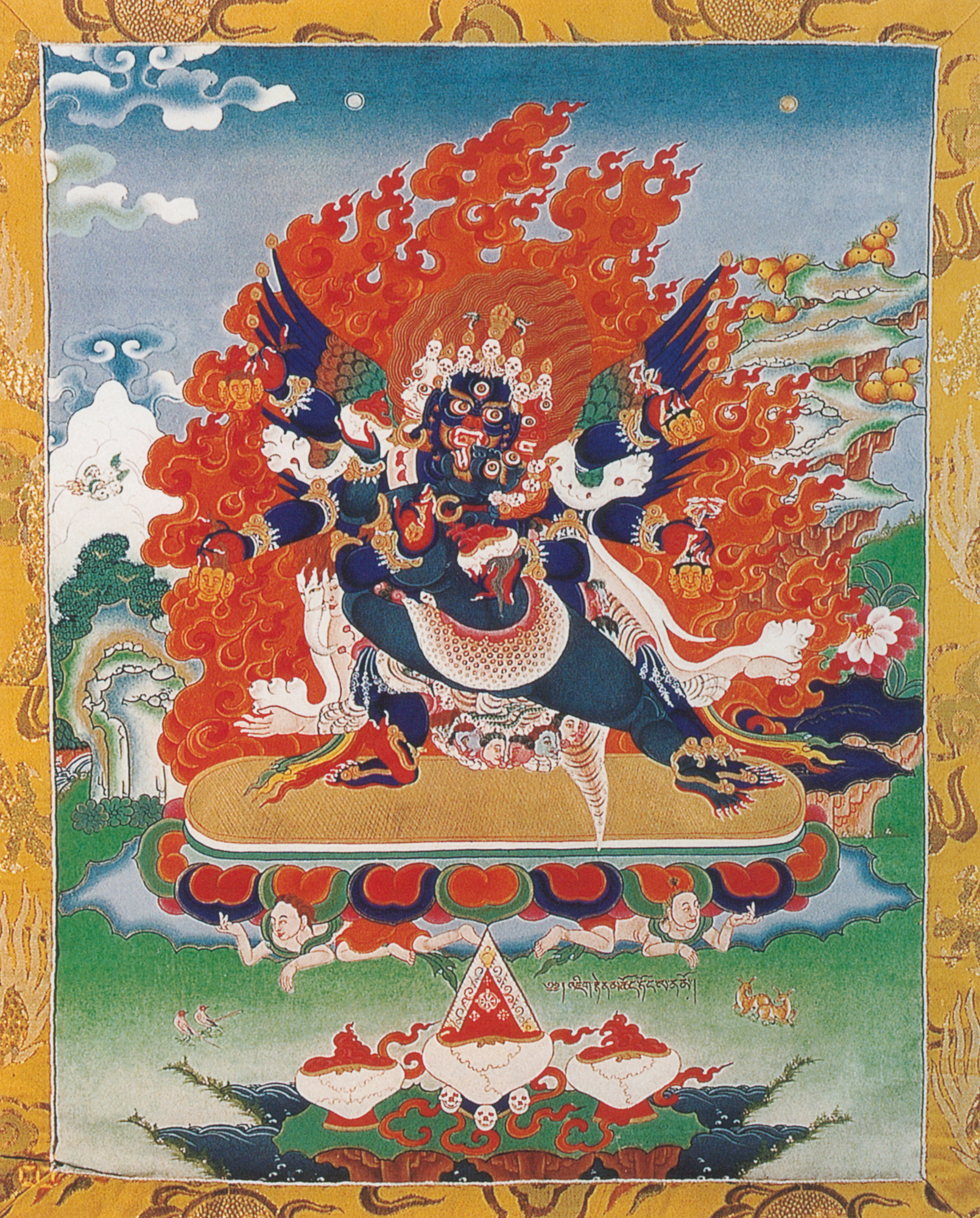
Wrathful Ksitigarbha

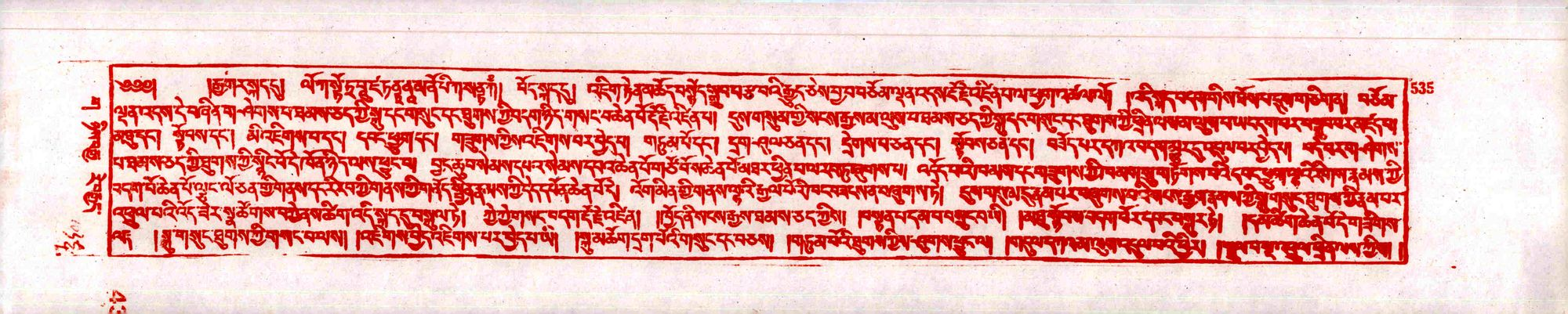
The Tantra of Lokastotrapūja, Practice text of Wrathful Ksitigarbha

Kṣitigarbha appears as Lokastotrapūjā-nātha (Tib. འཇིག་རྟེན་མཆོད་བསྟོད་ ’Jig rten mchod bstod ), one of the Eight Great Herukas (བཀའ་བརྒྱད་ Kagyed) — specifically the deity of ‘Mundane or Worldly Praises’, better known in the Tibetan tradition as Destroyer of Haughty Ones (Tib. དྲེགས་པ་ཀུན་འདུལ dregs pa kun ’dul). This wrathful Kṣitigarbha is depicted dark blue in colour, with a fierce expression, adorned with bone ornaments, and surrounded by flames of pristine awareness. the right face yellow, the left purple. six arms, four legs, and two wings. holds a vajra and a skull bowl (kapāla). other hands hold severed heads. He embraces his blue consort "Universal Tamer of the Three Realms of Existence" (Tib. ཁམས་གསུམ་སྤྱི་འདུལ Khamsum Chidul), who holds a khatvanga and a skull-cup. He embodies the dynamic, protective energy of the awakened Earth and is invoked to pacify the disturbances of the subterranean and earthly spirits.

Mantra : ཨོཾ་བཛྲ་ཙཎྜ་སརྦ་དུཥྚཱ་ནྟ་ཀ་ཧཱུྃ་ཕཊཿ om benza tsenda sarva dushtentaka hung pé:

According to Rob Mayer (2012), the Nyingma tradition classifies Lokastotrapūjānātha (’Jig rten mchod bstod) as one of the Eight Great Herukas (bka’ brgyad). Although its name literally means “Worldly Offerings and Praises”, it is not considered a mundane spirit, but an enlightened manifestation of Heruka that subdues worldly forces. Mayer, citing Rang ’byung pad ma snying thig by Dilgo Khyentsé Rinpoche, clarifies that these “Three Mundane Deities” (’Jig rten pa’i sde gsum) are regarded as transcendent aspects of enlightenment, equal in status to the “Five Wisdom Deities”.

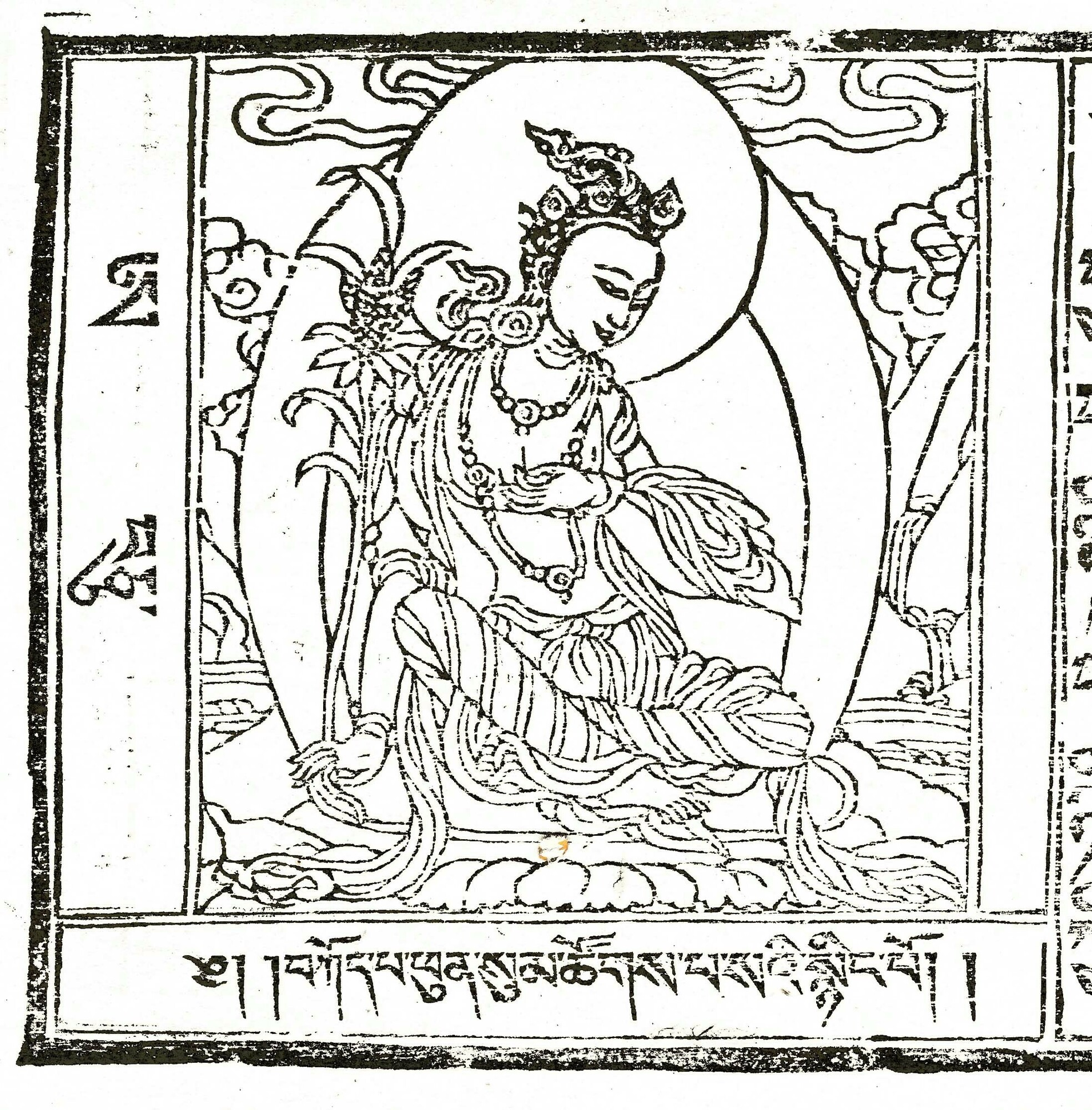
Ksitigarbha on Tibetan Xylography

Unlike the later East Asian representations of Kṣitigarbha as a monk with a pilgrim's staff, in the Indo-Tibetan context he appears as a young Indian prince, richly adorned with the silks, jewels, and long hair characteristic of the sambhogakāya bodhisattvas.

In Tibetan iconography he is usually white in color, sometimes described as green-blue in tantric sources such as The Great Chariot (’Gro ba chen po’i shing rta chen po). He is portrayed as peaceful, smiling, and compassionate, with one face and two hands:

- The right hand holds a young sprout (myu gu) at the level of the heart, symbolizing growth and renewal;
- The left hand holds an upturned bell (dril bu), resting at the hip, symbolizing the sound of the Dharma and the wisdom of emptiness.

He is seated in a half-lotus posture, radiating gentle light.

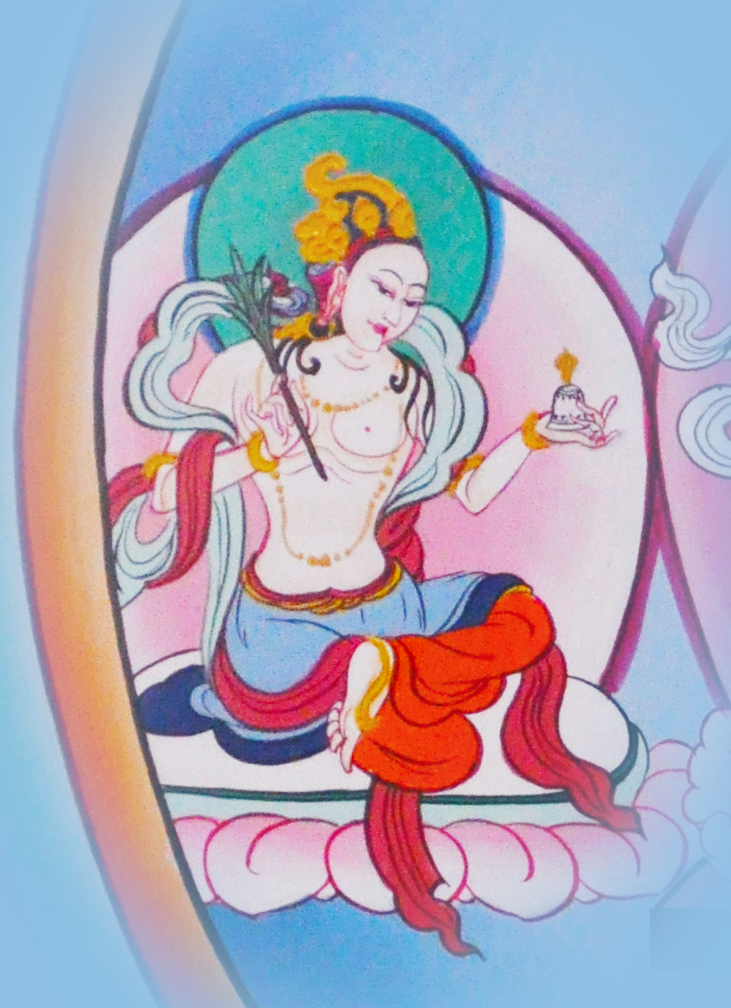
Ksitigarbha in Bardo Thodol

Kṣitigarbha is also mentioned in several ritual texts associated with Prithvī Devī, the Earth goddess, invoked for agricultural prosperity and the protection of crops. In those texts he appears only as a companion deity, representing the male or awakened aspect of the Earth principle. In these practices, the goddess is described as yellow in colour, with her upper body bare, holding a jewel and a vase; while Kṣitigarbha is depicted as white, dressed in bodhisattva attire, holding a sprout in the right hand and a bell in the left, seated in a half-lotus posture.

In the Mandala of the Forty-Two Peaceful Deities described in the Bardo Thödol (Tibetan Book of the Dead), Kṣitigarbha is depicted seated to the right of Vajrasattva-Akṣobhya, in the eastern direction, associated with the vajra family, the water element, and the mirror-like wisdom (me long ye shes). In this mandalic context, his color corresponds to the blue or white hue of the vajra family, depending on the lineage and interpretive system

Because there are few Tibetan tantric texts or sādhana cycles devoted specifically to him, Kṣitigarbha does not have a fixed iconography in Tibetan art. His depictions may vary between white, green-blue, or jewel-blue, reflecting both symbolic and regional interpretations.

=== Chinese traditions ===
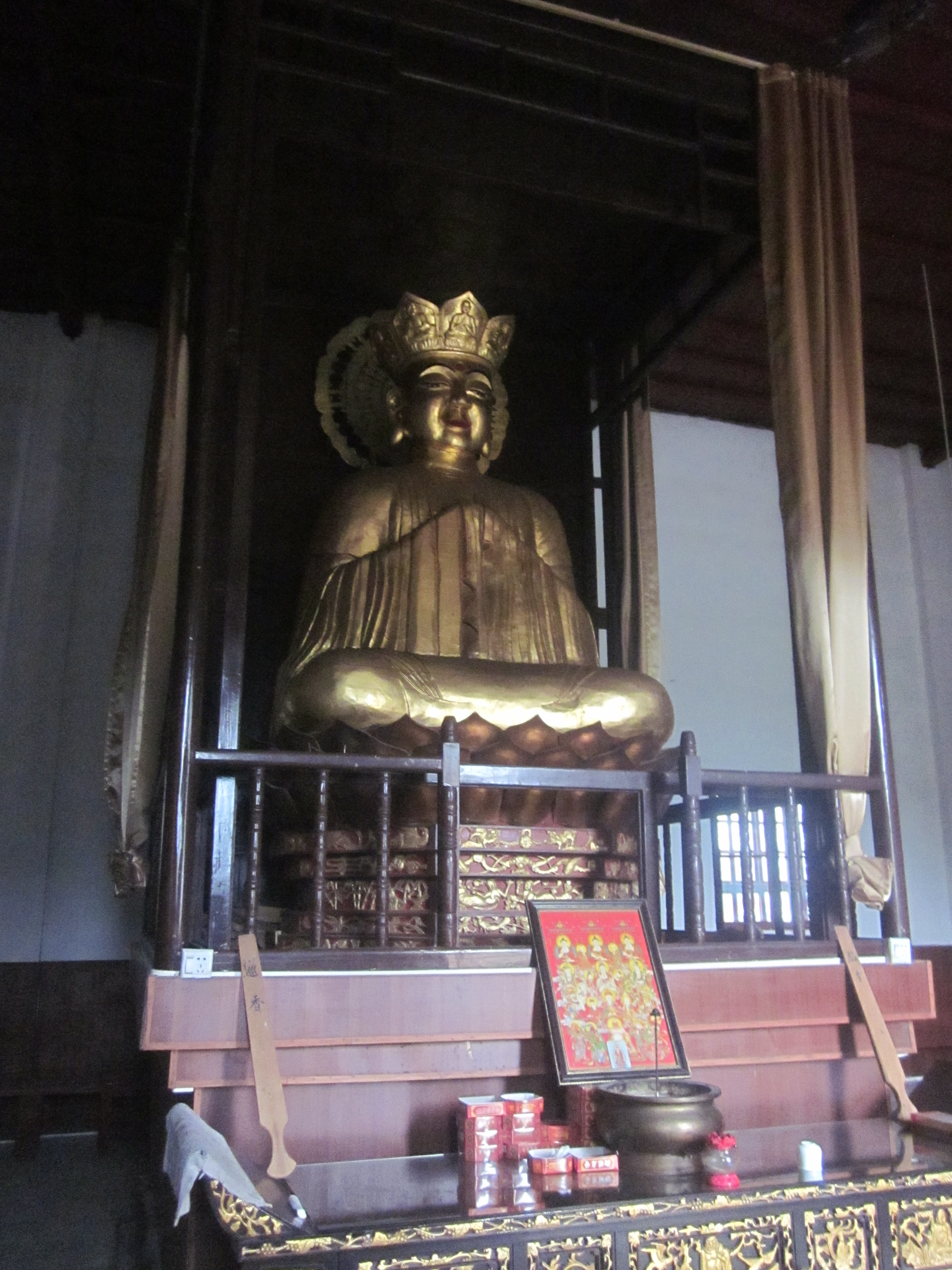
Statue of Dizang at Shishuang Temple in Hunan, China. Depicted with a Five-Buddha crown.

In certain Chinese Buddhist legends, the arhat Mulian (目連) acts as an assistant to Ksitigarbha, known as Dizang, in his vow to save the denizens of hell. As a result, Mulian is usually also venerated in temples that enshrine Dizang. In folk beliefs, Dizang has a mount called Diting, who is a divine beast that can distinguish good from evil, virtuous and foolish. In iconographic form, it is often enshrined at the side of Ksitigarbha, or portrayed with Ksitigarbha riding on its back as a mount.

Due to his scriptural row as a saviour of hell-beings and his vow of not attaining Buddhahood until the hells are empty, Dizang is commonly invoked in Chinese Buddhist rituals involving the salvific liberations of sentient beings in saṃsāra, such as the Yujia Yankou rite and the Shuilu Fahui ceremony.

In some areas, the admixture of traditional religions has led to Kṣitigarbha being also regarded as a deity in Taoism and Chinese folk religion. Ksitigharba Temples (Chinese: 地藏庵; pinyin: Dìzàng'ān) are Taoist temples that usually enshrine Kṣitigarbha as the main deity, along with other gods typically related to the Chinese netherworld Diyu, such as Yanluo Wang and Heibai Wuchang. Believers usually visit these temples to pray for the blessings of the ancestors and the souls of the dead. The 30th day of the seventh month of the Chinese calendar is celebrated as his birthday.

In modern East-Asian and Chinese sources a related notion of blue radiance appears. During the English translation (1959) of the Kṣitigarbha Bodhisattva Pūrvapraṇidhāna Sūtra, translator Pitt Chin Hui reported the appearance of “electric-blue light” in the locked shrine of Kṣitigarbha at Poh Ern Si Temple, Singapore, and noted that “Kṣitigarbha Bodhisattva’s colour is a jewel blue of the shade referred to in modern times as electric blue.” The vision recalls older textual images comparing the Bodhisattva's eyes to blue-lotus petals (utpala), and can be interpreted as a poetic expression of his association with the vajra family's blue-white luminosity rather than a literal bodily colour.

The Guān Dìzàng Púsà Gōngdé Jīng (觀地藏菩薩功德經, Sūtra on the Contemplation of the Merits of Kṣitigarbha), Taishō vol. 13 no. 412, describes Kṣitigarbha emitting “a blue lotus light illuminating the ten directions” (放青蓮光明遍照十方).

==== Association with Mount Jiuhua ====
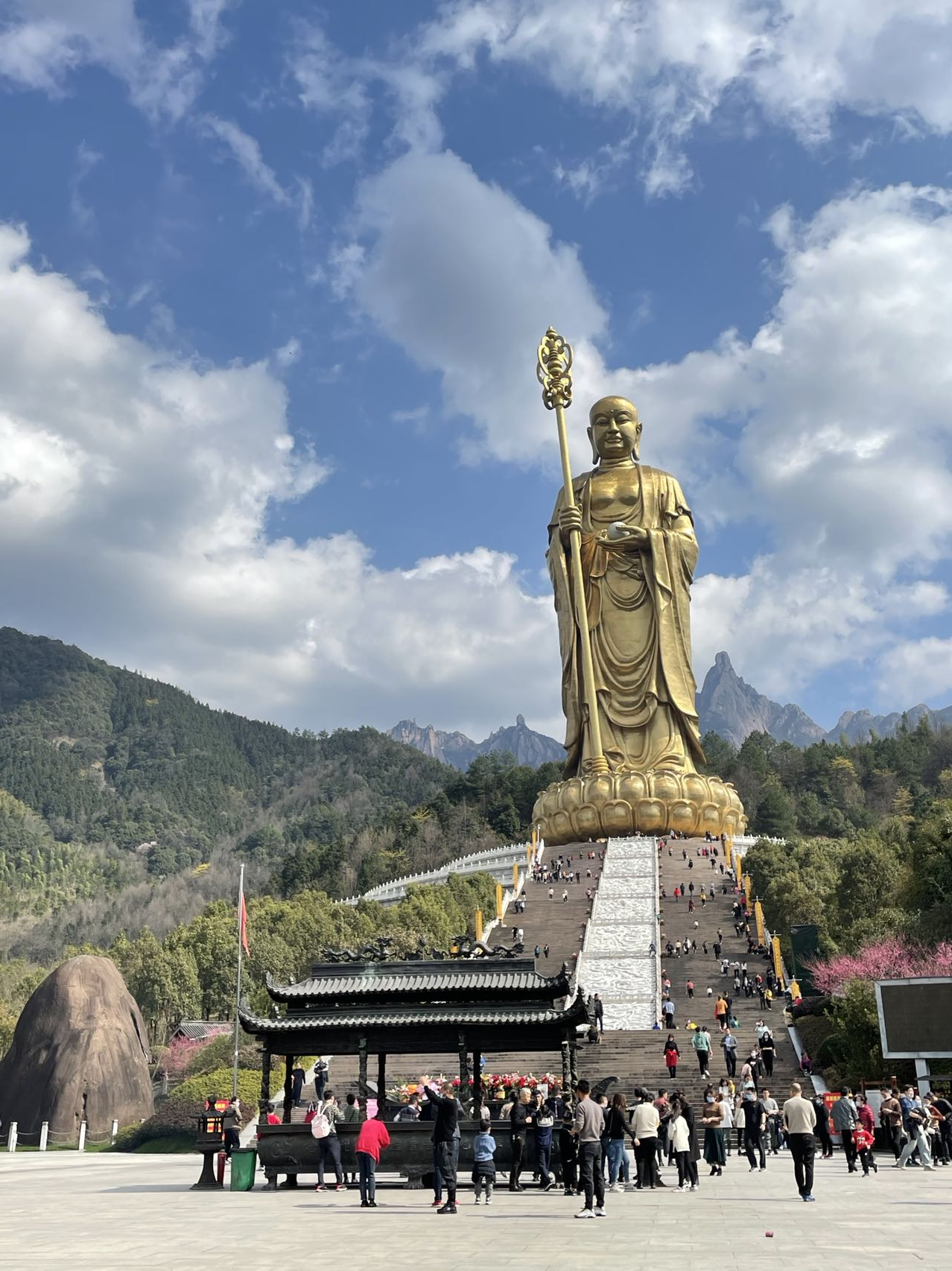
Colossal statue of Dizang bodhisattva at his bodhimaṇḍa of Mount Jiuhua in Anhui, China.

Chinese Buddhist traditions hold that Mount Jiuhua, one of the Four Sacred Mountains of China, was chosen by Dizang himself to serve as his bodhimaṇḍa. These traditions stem from historical accounts from biographical sources such as the Jiuhua shan Huacheng si ji (九華山化城寺記, lit: "Record of Huacheng Monastery on Mt. Jiuhua") by Fei Guanqing (費冠卿, active circa 9th century) and the Song gaoseng zhuan (宋高僧傳, lit: "Biographies of Eminent Monks of the Song dynasty") by the scholar monk Zanning^{[zh]} (贊寧, 919–1001).

During the Tang dynasty (618–709), Buddhism flourished and spread widely across China, eventually spreading to Korea. At the time, monks and scholars arrived from those countries to seek the dharma in China. One of these pilgrims was a former prince from Silla named Kim Gyo-gak, who became a monk under the Chinese name Dizang ("Kṣitigarbha"), pronounced Jijang in Korean. He went to Mount Jiuhua in present-day Anhui. After ascending, he decided to build a hut in a deep mountain area so that he could cultivate the dharma. At one point, the goddess of Mount Jiuhua transformed herself into a scorpion and stung Jijang seriously. However, he remained unaffected and continued his practice without interruption. Touched by his perseverance and religious piety, the goddess eventually manifested herself before Jijang and apologized to him, providing him with a medicinal antidote and fresh spring water for his use.

For a few years, Jijang continued to meditate in his hut, until one day, a local nobleman surnamed Zhuge (諸葛) led a group of friends and family to visit the mountain. Noticing the monk meditating in the hut, they went and took a look at his condition. They had noticed that his bowl did not contain any food, and that his hair had grown back. Taking pity on the monk, Zhuge decided to build a temple as an offering to him. The whole group descended the mountain immediately to discuss plans to build the temple. Mount Jiuhua was also property of a wealthy person named Minrang (閔讓), who obliged to build a temple on his mountain. Therefore, Minrang and the group ascended the mountain once more and asked Jijang how much land he needed. Jijang replied that he needed a piece of land that could be covered fully by his kasaya. Initially believing that a piece of sash could not provide enough land to build a temple, they were surprised when Jijang threw the kasaya in the air, and the robe expanded in size, covering the entire mountain. Minrang then decided to renounce the entire mountain to Jijang, and became his protector. Sometime later, Minrang's son also left secular life to become a monk.

Jijang lived in Mount Jiuhua for 75 years before dying at the age of 99. Three years after his nirvana, his tomb was opened, only to reveal that the body had not decayed. Because Jijang led his wayplace with much difficulty, most people had the intuition to believe that he was indeed an incarnation of Dizang. Jijang's well-preserved, dehydrated body may still be viewed today at the Shrine of the Living Buddha on Mount Jiuhua.

=== Japanese traditions ===
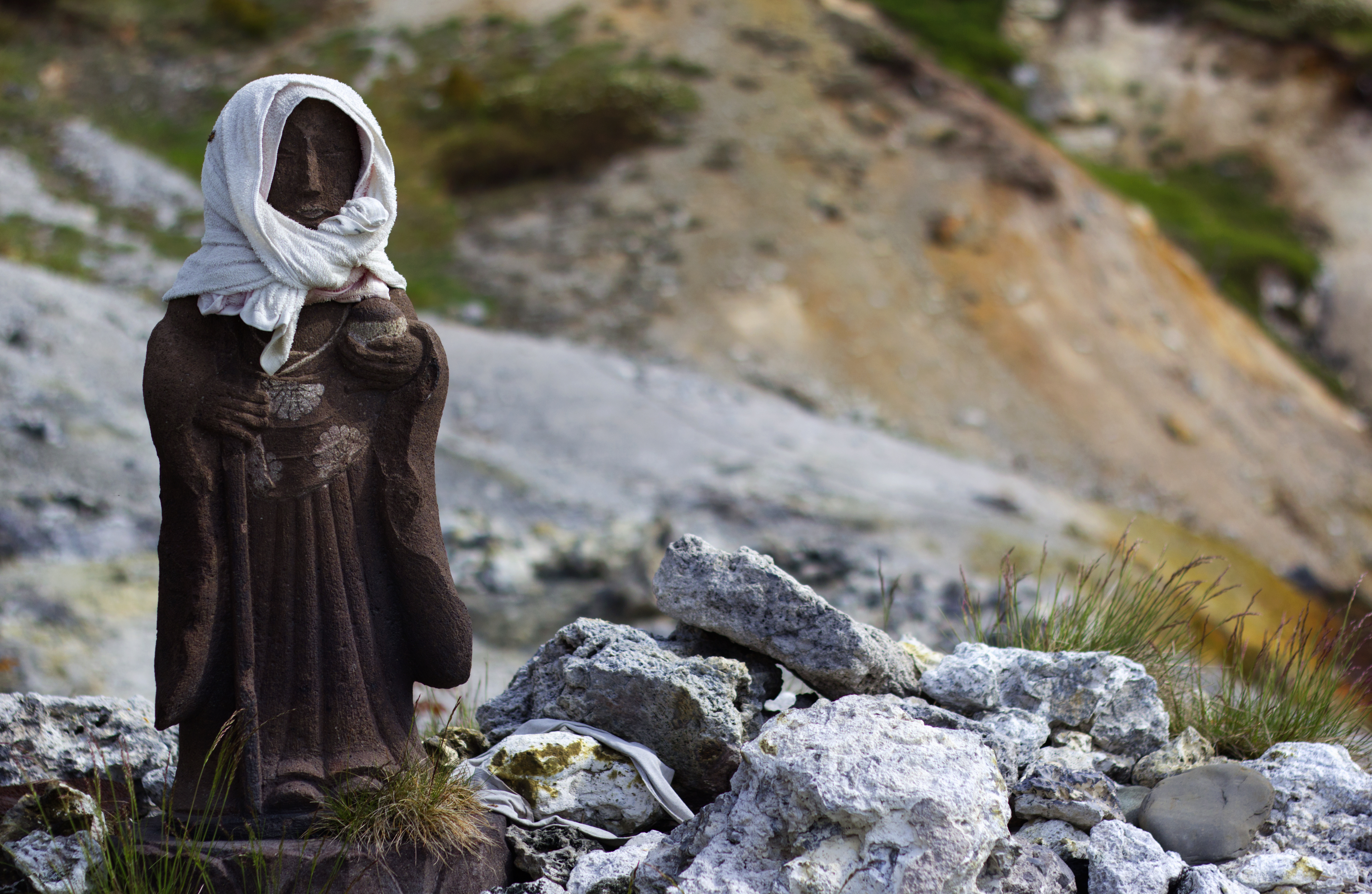
Kṣitigarbha (or in Japanese, Jizō) statue at Osorezan (Mt. Osore), Aomori.

In Japan, Kṣitigarbha, known as Jizō, or respectfully as Ojizō-sama, is one of the most loved of all Japanese divinities. According to legend, the first Jizō-statue was introduced in Japan in the reign of emperor Shōmu in the Nara period. However, while records exist that indicate a Jizō-statue in the Tōdai-ji, the existence of these statues in former times is probable but no evidence has yet been discovered. Jizō's worship developed significantly and became more widespread in Japan during the Heian (794–1185) and Kamakura (1185–1333) periods. During these periods, people were afraid of the period that is known as mappō, the decline and disappearance of Dharma, which was propagated by Pure Land Buddhism as a period in which it is impossible to understand the original Buddhist teachings anymore and attain enlightenment through traditional means. This foundation supported the role among people of Kṣitigarbha as he helped those who were in danger of falling into hell realm in hearing their confessions and to ensure their salvation. One of the widespread practices of Kṣitigarbha-worship in Japan was the citation and copying of the Lotus Sutra as it promised benefits in the present and future. Kṣitigarbha satisfied those immediate needs and the mundane wishes of worshippers to the extent of delivering them to the Pure Land of Amida in the times of declining Dharma. The Konjaku Monogatarishū includes many tales about him and another collection of tales, Jizō Bosatsu Reigenki, consists of twenty-five stories that focus on miracles performed by Jizō. The devotees described in these stories recite the Lotus Sutra.

The statue at Kenchō-ji Temple, crafted in the 15th century, signifies the longstanding tradition of enshrining Jizō where the doomed or suffering were memorialized. Artistic examinations, such as Hank Glassman's The Face of Jizō, reveal how medieval Japanese society integrated Jizō imagery into both elite and folk religious practice, blending Buddhist doctrine with local traditions and boundary guardian cults (like Dōsojin).

In contemporary Japan, His statues are a common sight, especially by roadsides and in graveyards. Jizō is celebrated as the protector of children (including deceased and unborn), travelers, pilgrims, and the souls suffering in the realms of the dead. He is usually depicted as a humble monk holding a staff with six rings and a wish-fulfilling jewel.

==== Ryōki ====
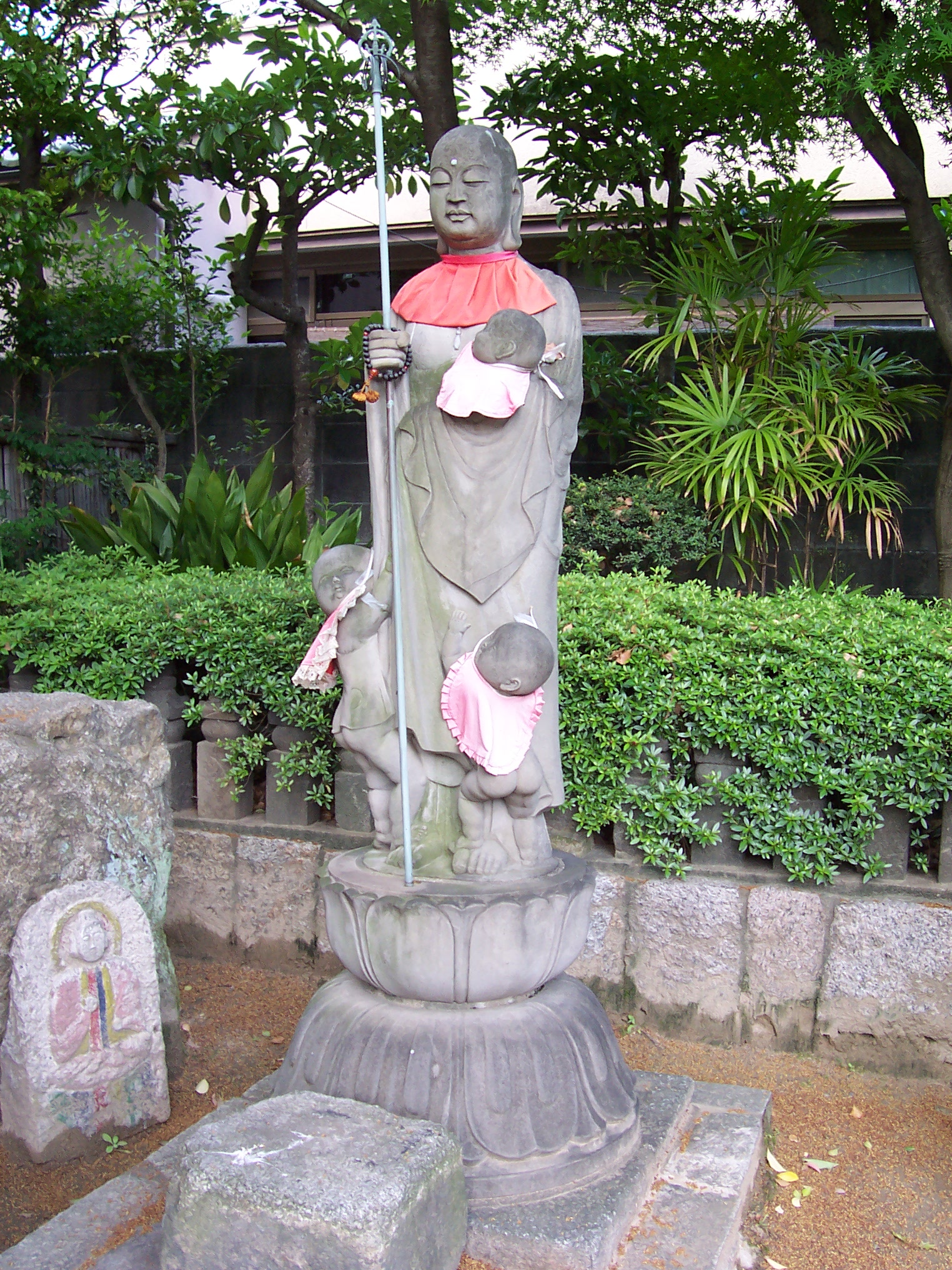
Jizō bodhisattva statue at Mibu-dera temple, depicted with children and bibs. Japan.

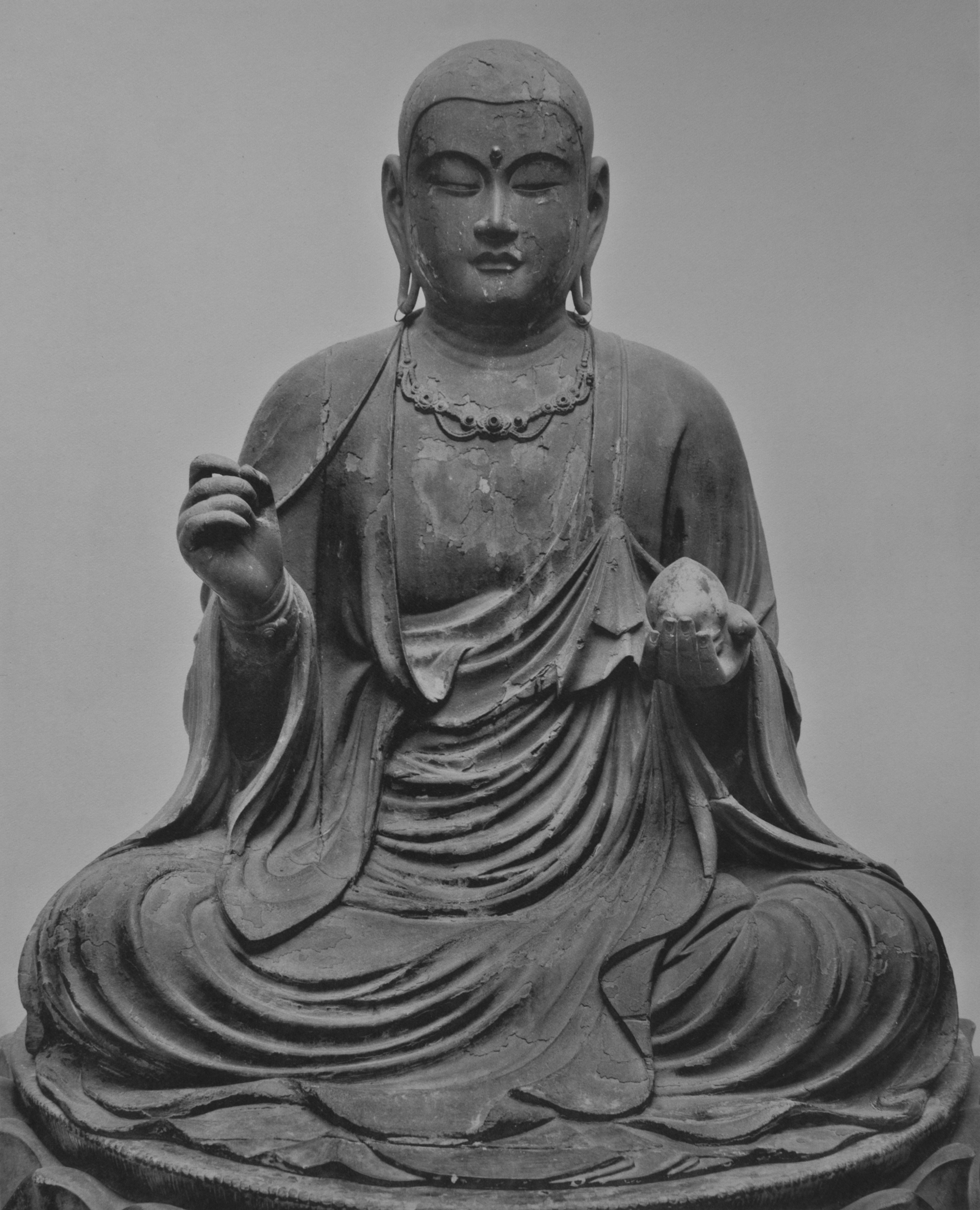
Jizō bodhisattva statue by Unkei. Rokuharamitsu-ji temple. 12th century. Japan.

The Ryōki (c. 822 CE), the earliest known collection of setsuwa or tales, contains a story about Fujiwara Hirotari. After he dies he catches sight of his wife suffering in the Land After Death, and with the aid of Jizō he returns to life and lifts the burden of suffering from his wife by copying the Lotus Sutra.

==== Children's limbo legend ====
In the common tradition associated with the Sai no Kawara (賽の河原), the banks of the Sanzu River, Jizō is portrayed as the protector of the souls of dead children, who are condemned to stack piles of stones, in vain, since the piles are repeatedly toppled by oni or demons. In a later version recorded by Lafcadio Hearn, the oni not only wreck the stone piles, but torment the children, who find refuge in Jizō's robes. In an earlier version, found in the Fuji no hitoana no sōshi (富士人穴草子; "The Tale of the Fuji Cave", c. 1600 or earlier), c. 1600 or earlier (Note: The earliest extant texts are c. 1600, and Kimbrough (2006) uses a copy dated 1603 formerly in the Akagi Bunko collection. But the work is known to have existed by 1527.) when the dead children pile stones at the Sai no Kawara, winds and flames are the agents knocking down the stone piles, and the flames reduce the children to cremated bones, to be revived by Jizō (or by the oni). (Note: Kimbrough's version (2006) translated from a manuscript dated to 1603 is wanting in some details, such as the children stacking up stones into "stone towers" (石の塔), and the "evil wind" (悪風) knocking down the towers, forcing the children to reassemble them, after which the flames arrive; Jizō then recites a chant and restores the children.)

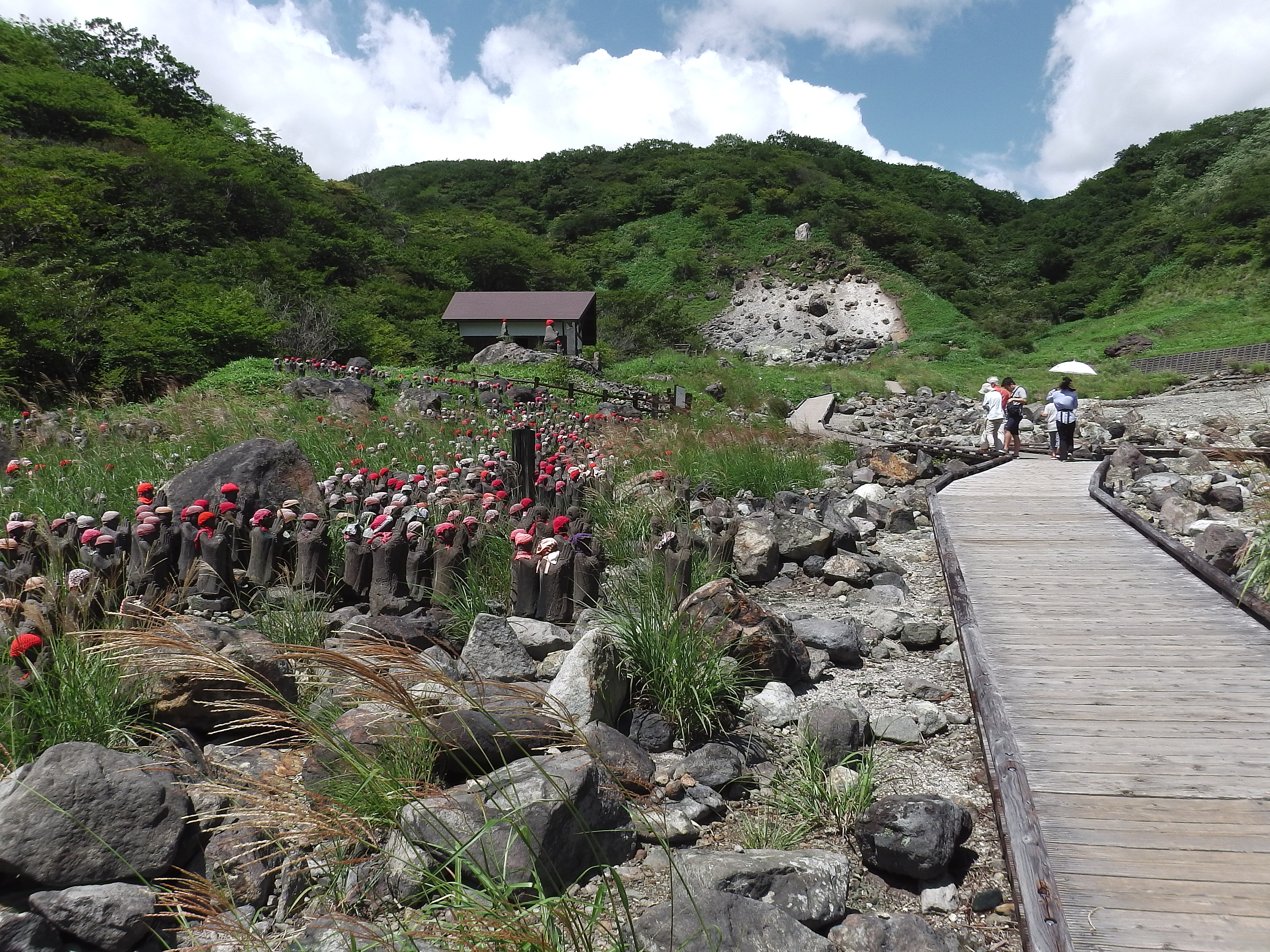
Sentai-Jizō or 1000 Jizō Statues at Nasu, Tochigi. This landscape is compared to Sai no Kawara.

This concept of Sai no Kawara, or children's limbo, first appeared in the Otogizōshi during the Muromachi Period, and the "Tale of the Fuji Cave", discussed above, is part of the Otogizōshi. However, the concept had been developed much earlier, being associated with the priest Kūya in the 10th century. The legend was then connected with Kūya and his wasan, or chanting, probably some time in the 17th century, creating the Jizō wasan. As for the identification of certain this-worldly features with the Sai no Kawara, as on the mountain Osorezan in northeastern Japan, the establishment of Jizō worship there occurred during the late Tokugawa Period, in the early to mid-18th century, despite temple pamphlets (engi, or accounts of the founding of temples) claiming that it dates back to the 9th century, when the priest Ennin supposedly established a place of worship for Jizō at Osorezan, then known as Usorizan.

==== Lost pregnancies ====
Jizō is also worshipped as the guardian of the souls of mizuko ("water children"), stillborn, miscarried, or aborted children, in the ritual of mizuko kuyō (水子供養; "offering to water children"). In this context, he is worshipped under the form of Mizuko Jizō.

==== Offerings ====
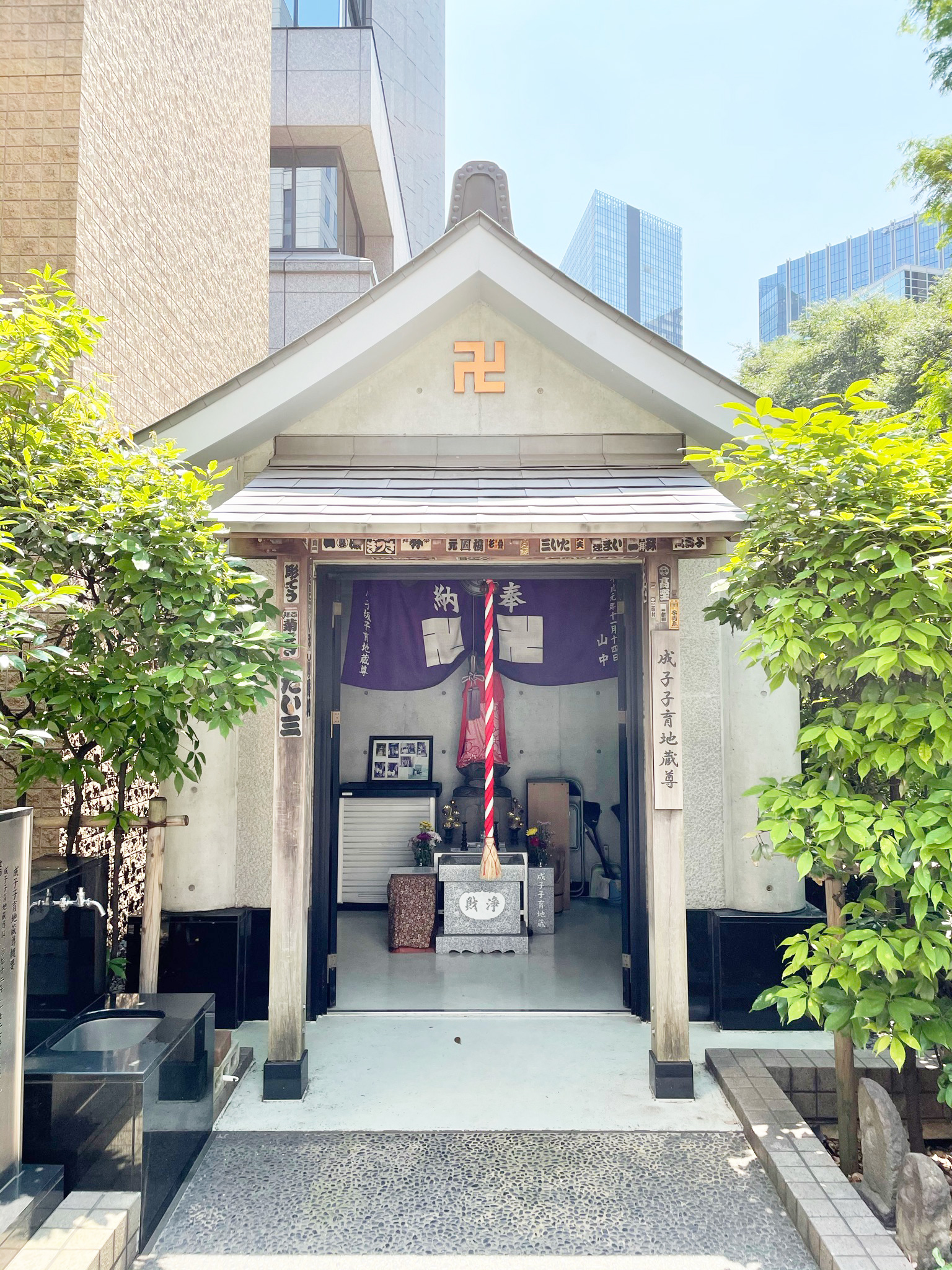
A small shrine of Kosodate-Jizō or Childcare-Kṣitigarbha at Nishi-Shinjuku, Tokyo.

Statues of Jizō are sometimes accompanied by piles of stones placed on or by them in the hope that the time that dead children have to suffer in the underworld may be shortened. The practice is derived from the tradition of building stupas as an act of merit-making. Jizō is seen as the guardian of children in general, but in particular of children who died before their parents. Statues of Jizō can sometimes be seen wearing children's clothing or bibs, or with toys brought by grieving parents to help their lost ones, in the hope that Jizō will protect them. Sometimes the offerings are given by parents to thank Jizō for saving their children from serious illness. Jizō's features are commonly made to resemble those of the children he protects.

==== Agonashi Jizō ====
Lit. = Jizō without a Jaw. Also known as Shitsu Heiyu 歯痛平癒地蔵 (Jizō who Heals Toothaches). Says Gabi Greve:

In the year 1870, the temple 伴桂寺 at Oki Island 隠岐島 had to close down. The last priest of the temple had been a disciple of the head priest of the Hagi Temple in Osaka, so he gave all his temple treasures to Hagi Temple, including a statue of the "Jizō without a Jaw" reportedly made by Ono no Takamura 小野篁 (802–853), a scholar and poet of Heian Japan. Two years later a special hall was built for the statue, which is now a secret (hibutsu 秘仏) statue and only shown once a year to the public.” Gabi continues: ”Once upon a time in the city of Kanawa in Omiya town on the island of Oki, there lived a man who had a painful toothache. For three days, he was crying all day long 'my tooth aches, my tooth aches so much!' He could not sleep at night and not eat during the day because of the pain. In the end he pulled out his jaw, threw it away - and died. But then, how wonderful, he was reborn as a Bodhisattva. The pious people of Oki Island then made a wooden statue of Jizō without a chin and prayed to it when they got a toothache. Soon people from far away also came to pray for healing, and as a gift of gratitude placed one NASHI (pear) into a nearby river or lake or the ocean. This is a pun on the word NASHI (pear) and NASHI (without, to not have) -- in this case, to not have a toothache.

==== Roadside god ====
Jizō is also believed to be one of the protective deities of travellers, the dōsojin, and roadside statues of Jizō are a common sight in Japan. Firefighters are also believed to be under his protection.

=== Southeast Asian traditions ===
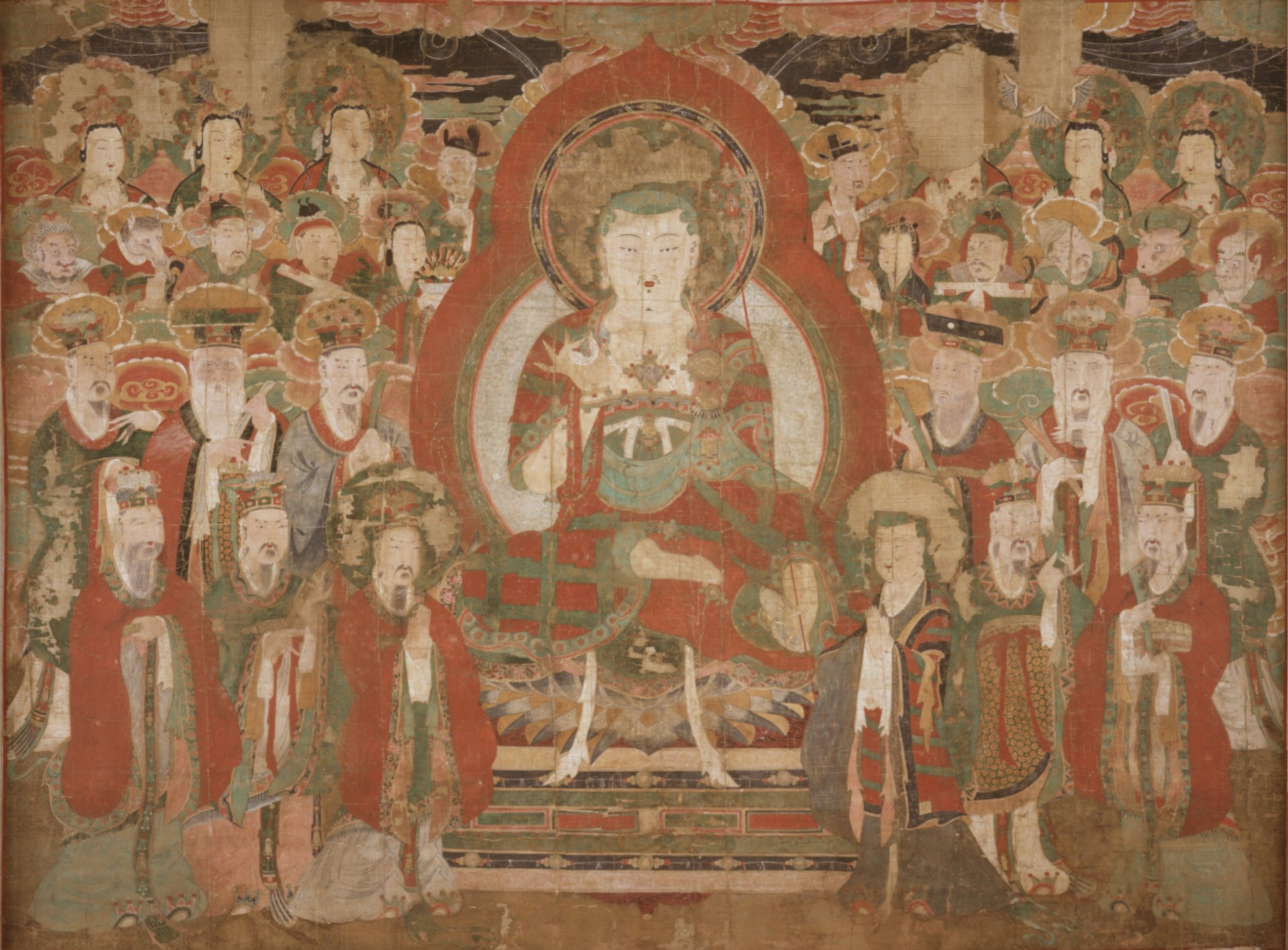
Korean painting of Kṣitigarbha as supreme ruler of the Underworld, late 18th century.

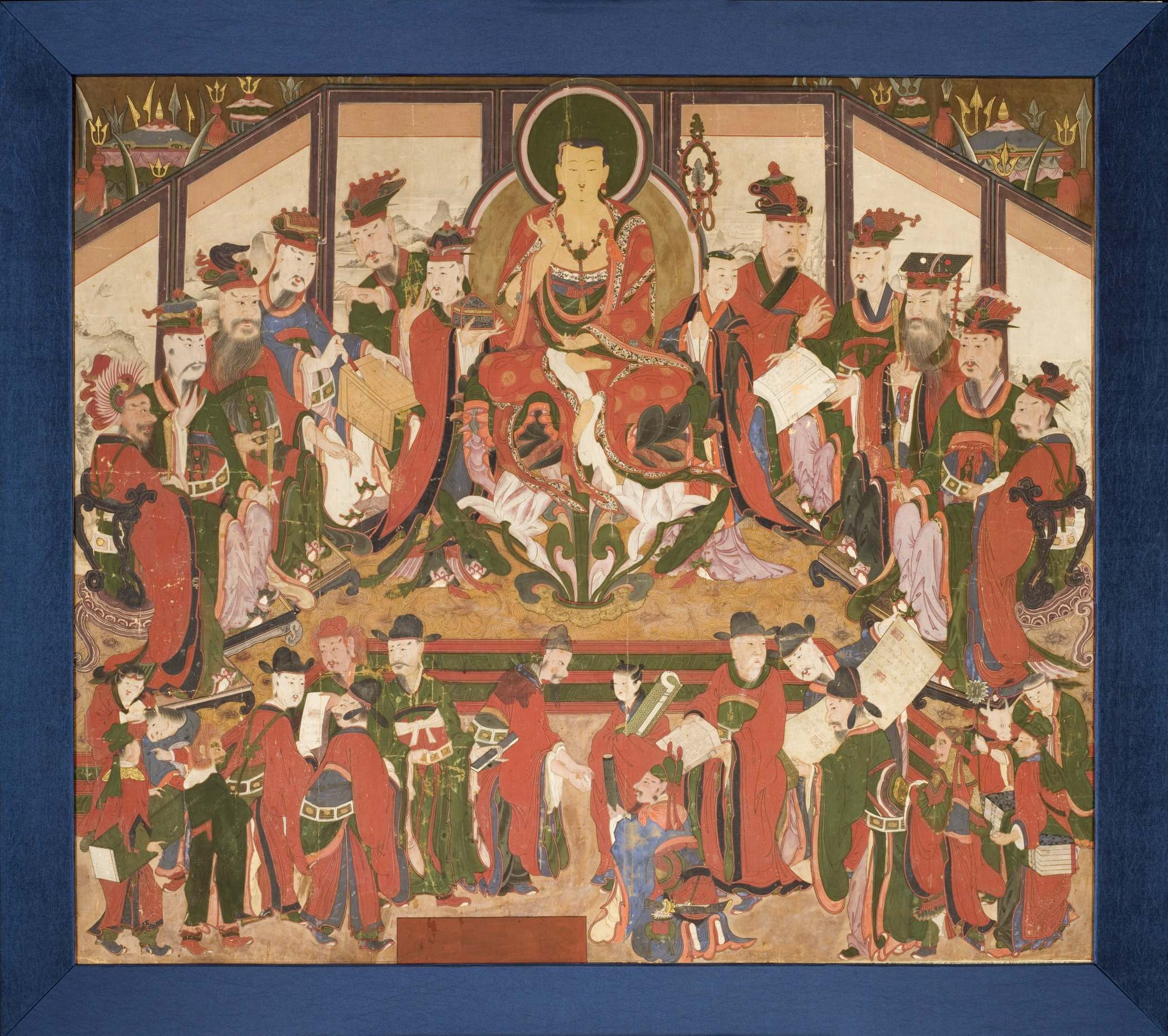
Korean Joseon dynasty painting of Bodhisattva Jijang (Kṣitigarbha) and the Ten Kings of Hell.

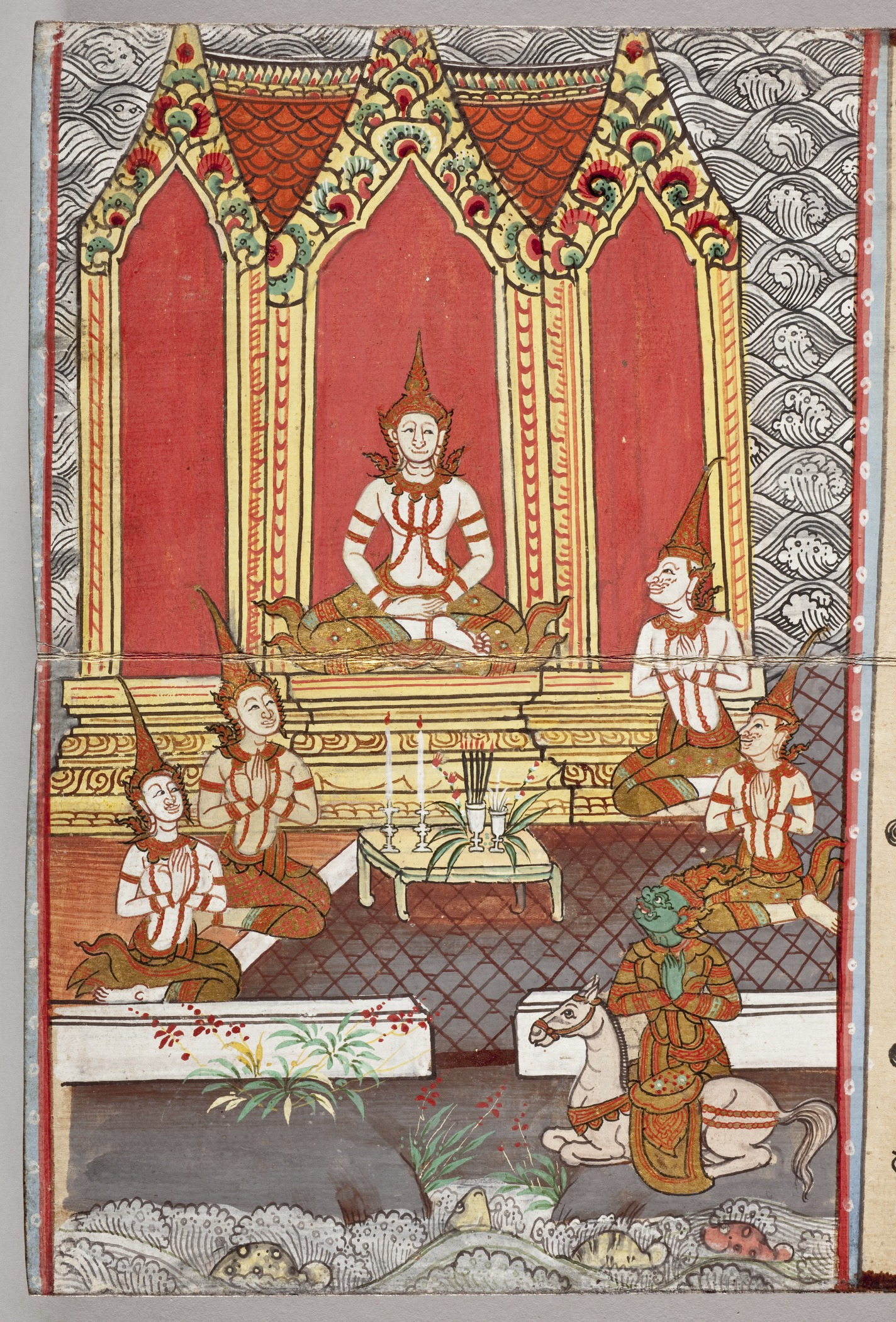
Statue of Phra Malai from the Phra Malai Manuscript of Thailand, c. 1860–1880.

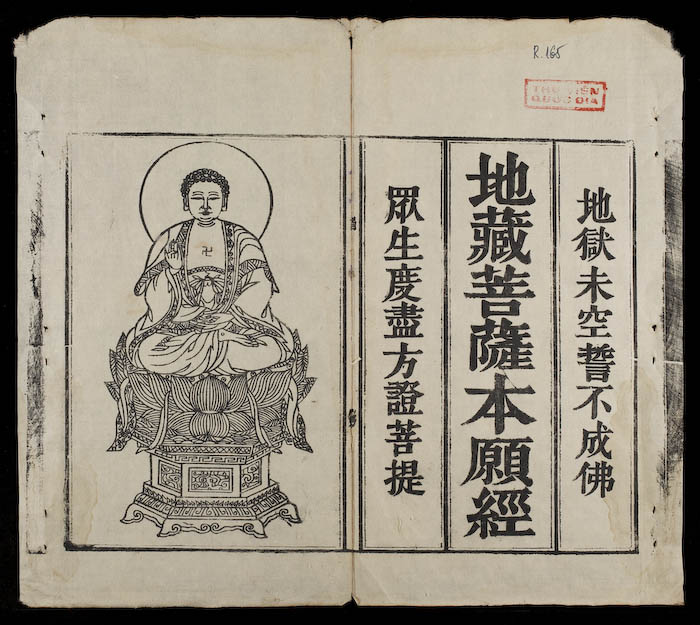
First page of Vietnamese Mahayana sutra Kṣitigarbha (Địa tạng Bồ Tát bản nguyện kinh), written in chữ Nho which was printed 300+ years ago.

In Theravada Buddhism, the story of a bhikkhu named Phra Malai with similar qualities to Kṣitigarbha is well known throughout Southeast Asia, especially in Thailand and Laos. Legend has it that he was an arhat from Sri Lanka who achieved great supernatural powers through his own merit and meditation. He is also honoured as a successor to Mahāmoggallāna, the Buddha's disciple foremost for his supernatural attainments. In the story, this pious and compassionate monk descends to Hell to give teachings and comfort the suffering hell-beings there. He also learns how the hell-beings are punished according to their sins in the different hells.

== Mantra ==
In mainstream Chinese Buddhism and Japanese Shingon Buddhism, the mantra of Kṣitigarbha comes from the "Treasury of Mantras" section of the Mahavairocana Tantra. The effect of this mantra is producing the "Samadhi Realm of Adamantine Indestructible Conduct." This mantra is the following:

Namaḥ samantabuddhānāṃ, ha ha ha, sutanu svāhā

=== Other mantras ===
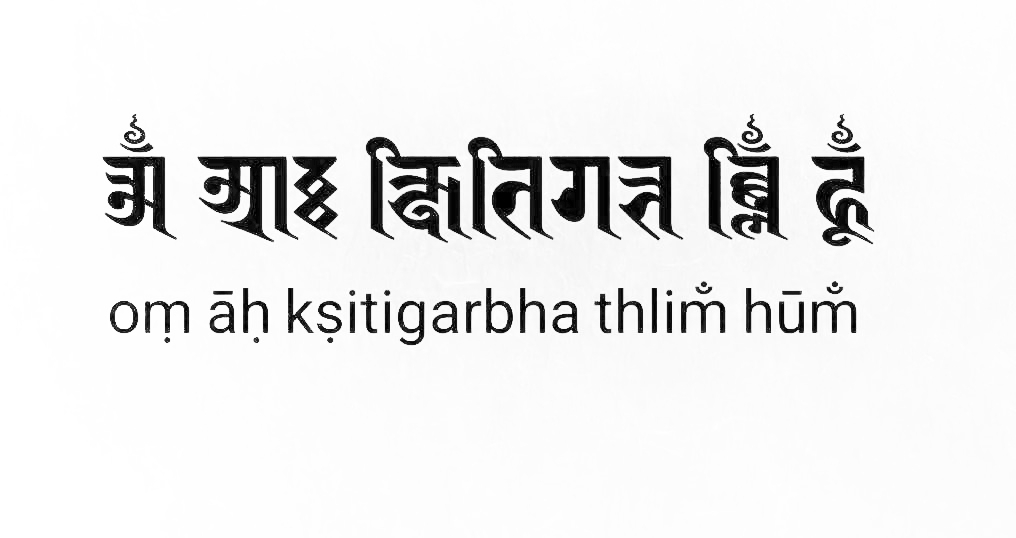
Ksitigarbha Mantra in Ranjana script

- Mantra of Eliminating Fixed Karma:

ॐ प्रमर्दने स्वाहा - Oṃ pramardane svāhā

In Chinese, this mantra is called miè dìngyè zhēnyán in pinyin (滅定業真言). It reads:

嗡鉢囉末鄰陀寧娑婆訶; Ōng bō là mò lín tuó níng suō pó hē

- In Chinese Buddhism, the following mantra is associated with Kṣitigarbha:

南無地藏王菩薩; Ná mó Dìzàng wáng pú sà

- In Korean Buddhism, the following mantra is associated with Kṣitigarbha:

Namu Jijang Bosal 나무 지장보살

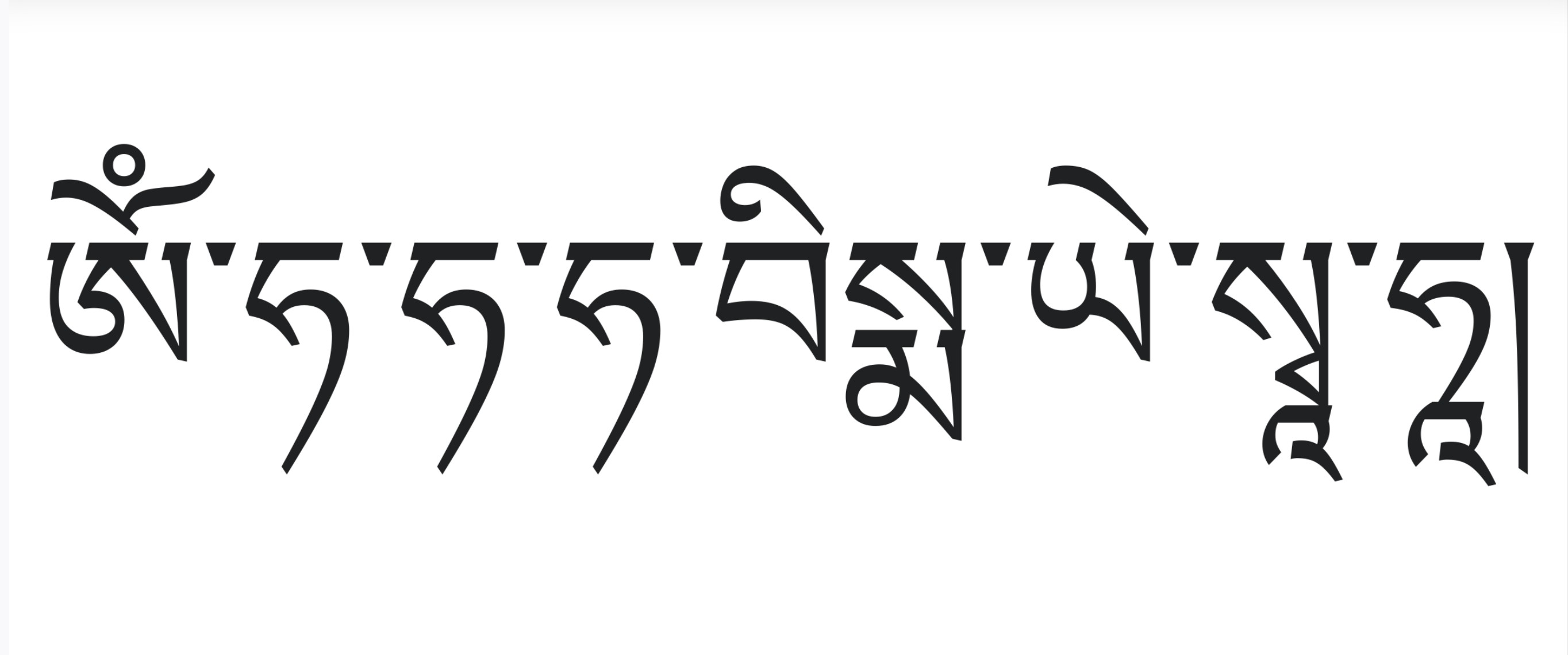
Ksitigarbha mantra in Tibetan

- In Tibetan Buddhism, the following mantras are associated with Kṣitigarbha:

Oṃ Kṣitigarbha Bodhisatvāya ༄༅།། ༀ་ཀྵི་ཏི་གརྦྷ་བོ་དྷི་ས་ཏྭཱ་ཡ།།

Oṃ Ha Ha Ha Vismaye Svāhā ༄༅།། ཨོཾ་ཧ་ཧ་ཧ་བིསྨ་ཡེ་སྭཱ་ཧཱ།།

- In Shingon Buddhism, a mantra used in public religious services is:

On kakaka bisanmaei sowaka オン カカカ ビサンマエイ ソワカ

- In Sanskrit:

ॐ ह ह ह विस्मये स्वाहा Oṃ ha ha ha vismaye svāhā ཨོཾ་ཧ་ཧ་ཧ་བིསྨ་ཡེ་སྭཱ་ཧཱ།

Om! Ha ha ha! O wondrous one! svāhā!

嗡，哈哈哈，溫三摩地梭哈; Ōng hā hā hā wēn sān mó dì suō hā

== Haiku & Senryū ==
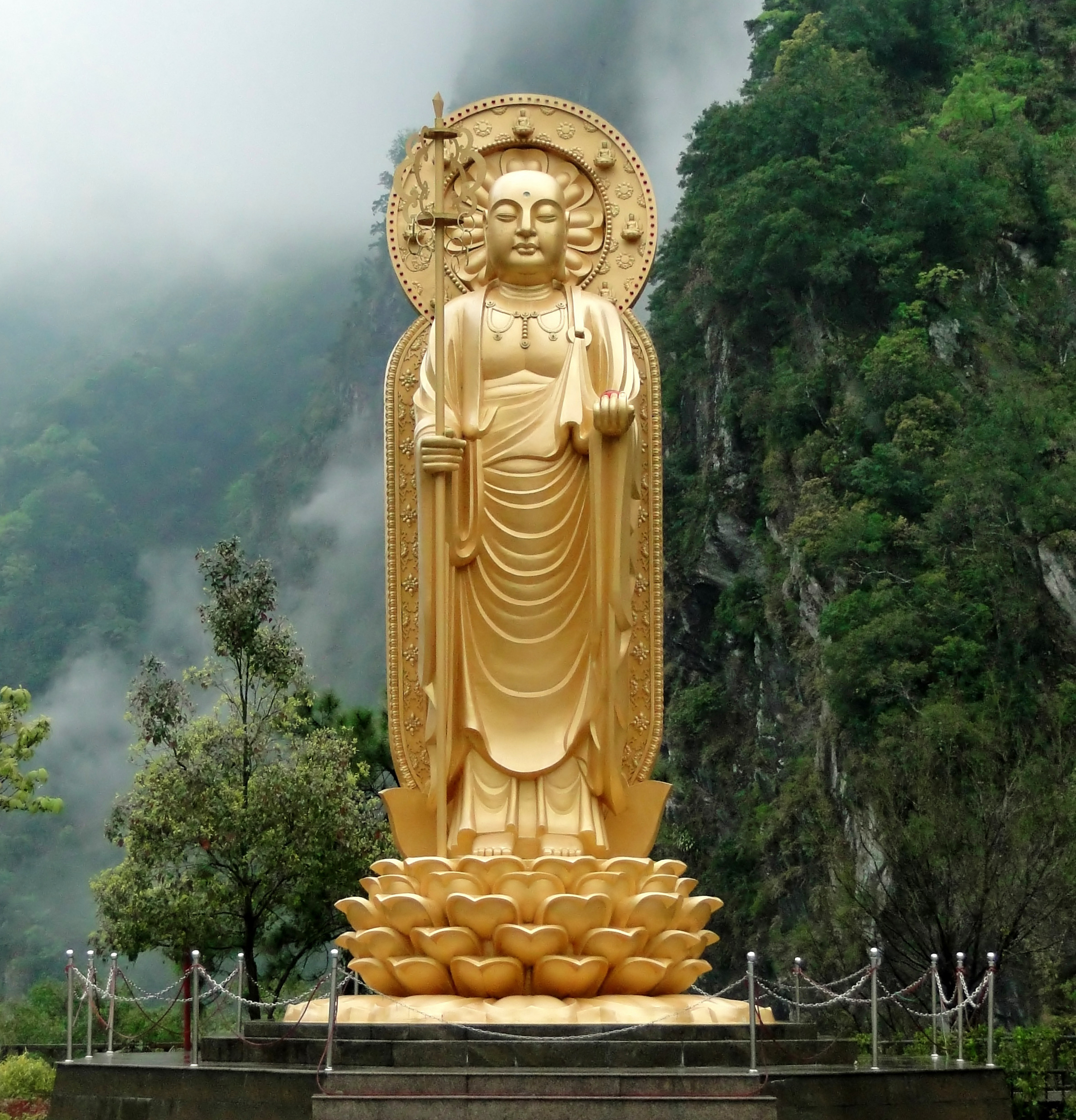
Bodhisattva Kṣitigarbha in Hsiang-Te Temple, Taiwan.

蛞蝓に
口を吸われた
石地蔵

— part of a Senryū
Translation:

The stone image of Jizō
kissed on the mouth
by a slug

雀の子
地蔵の袖に
かくれけり

— haiku by Issa 1814
Translation:

The young sparrows
return into Jizō's sleeve
for sanctuary

なでしこや
地蔵菩薩の
跡先に

— haiku by Issa
Translation:

Blooming pinks
behind and in front
of Saint Jizō

秋の暮
辻の地蔵に
油さす

— haiku by Buson
Translation:

In autumn dusk
at the wayside shrine for the Jizō image
I pour more votive oil

== In popular culture ==
- The Saviour Monk is a 1975 Hong Kong film starring David Tang wei as Dizang-wang (Ksitigarbha king), and Doris lung Chun-Erh. The film was directed by Liang Che-Fu. By 2020, the movie has been digitally restored by the Hong Kong Embassy In The Philippines and the University of the Philippines Film Institute.
- The vandalism of a Kṣitigarbha statue is the central theme of The Locker, a 2004 Japanese horror and thriller film directed by Kei Horie.
- In the 1988 video game Super Mario Bros. 3, Mario and Luigi gain the ability to turn into Kṣitigarbha statues. This ability returns in the 2011 video game Super Mario 3D Land. Additionally, multiple Kṣitigarbha statues appear in Super Mario Odyssey.
- In the 2004 video game Ninja Gaiden, a defaced Kṣitigarbha statue can be found in Ryu Hayabusa's village, with its head knocked off. If Hayabusa replaces the head, the statue's cintamani becomes a "Life of the Gods" item that can extend his maximum health.
- In the 2004 Hong Kong drama My Date with a Vampire III, Ksitigarbha was portrayed by Ricky Chan, also known as Ma Siu-Fu, Ma Siu-Ling's twin brother. He starts a romance with Chang'e and is unaware that she has actually been going around killing people when she cannot control her vampire bloodlust. Later in the series, he is revealed to be the reincarnation of the bodhisattva Ksitigarbha (地藏王; Dìzàng Wáng), who presides over the Underworld and relentlessly tries to help the souls of the damned get out of Hell. He helps the protagonists in their quest to stop Yaochi Shengmu and Fuxi from fighting and ending the world.
- In the 2022 video game Ghostwire: Tokyo, praying to Kṣitigarbha statues (referenced as Jizo statues in-game) allows the player to carry more ether, which is used to attack enemies.
- In The House of the Lost on the Cape, the ojizōsama play a crucial role in restoring hope to a region devastated by a tsunami.
- In the 1988 Studio Ghibli animated film My Neighbor Totoro, the character Mei (who has become lost in the countryside) is found by her older sister Satsuki while waiting by a Jizo statue. The sisters also take shelter at a roadside Jizo shrine after being caught in a rainstorm.

== Notable Iconography ==
- A 13th-century Jizō statue by the renowned sculptor Kaikei—originally at Kōfuku-ji and now in the Met Museum—represents exquisite Kamakura realism in Buddhist sculpture.
- Also at the Met: a richly adorned 1291 Jizō intended for Kōfuku-ji, crafted from hinoki wood with gold leaf and rock crystal eyes, typifying devotional artistry of the era.
- A medieval copper relief shows Jizō presiding over the Ten Kings of Hell, reminding judges to temper justice with compassion.

== See also ==
- Avalokitesvara, Samantabhadra & Manjusri
- Atago Gongen
- Butsu Zone, a manga in which Kṣitigarbha is a main character
- Diting
- Dizang of Mount Jiuhua
- Karuṇā (Brahmavihara)
- King Yama & Yanluo Wang
- Kṣitigarbha Bodhisattva Pūrvapraṇidhāna Sūtra
- Maliyadeva
- Mizuko kuyō
- Mount Jiuhua & Kim Gyo-gak
- Phra Malai Kham Luang

== Bibliography ==
- Bargen, Doris G. (1992), "Ancestral to None: Mizuko in Kawabata", Japanese Journal of Religious Studies, 19 (4): 337–377, doi:10.18874/jjrs.19.4.1992.337-377, JSTOR 30233481
- Bays, Jan Chozen (2002). Jizo Bodhisattva: Modern Healing and Traditional Buddhist Practice. Tuttle Pub. ISBN 978-0-8048-3189-5.
- Bays, Jan Chozen (2003). Jizo Bodhisattva: Guardian of Children, Travelers, and Other Voyagers. Shambhala Publications. ISBN 978-1-59030-080-0.
- Brooks, Anne Page (1981), "'Mizuko Kuyō' and Japanese Buddhism", Japanese Journal of Religious Studies, 8 (3/4): 119–147, doi:10.18874/jjrs.8.3-4.1981.119-147, JSTOR 30233267, archived from the original on 2016-03-20
- French, Frank G. (ed); Shi, Daoji (trans.)(2003). The Sutra of Bodhisattva Ksitigarbha's Fundamental Vows (地藏經), Sutra Translation Committee of the U.S. and Canada/The Corporate Body of the Buddha Educational Foundation Taipei, Taiwan, 2nd ed.
- Glassman, Hank (2012). The Face of Jizo: Image and Cult in Medieval Japanese Buddhism. Honolulu: University of Hawaii Press. ISBN 978-1-59030-080-0.
- Miyazaki, Fumiko; Williams, Duncan (2001), "Ancestral to None: Mizuko in Kawabata", Japanese Journal of Religious Studies, 28 (3/4): 399–440, JSTOR 30233481
- Moto-Sanchez, Milla Micka (2016). Jizō, Healing Rituals, and Women in Japan, Japanese Journal of Religious Studies 43 (2), 307–331
- Ng, Zhiru (2007). The Making of a Savior Bodhisattva: Dizang in Medieval China. University of Hawaii Press. ISBN 978-0-8248-3045-8.
- Visser, Marinus Willem de (1914). The Bodhisattva Ti-Tsang (Jizo) in China and Japan, Berlin: Oesterheld
