= Tōsen-ji =

Coordinates: 35°46′45″N 139°52′16″E

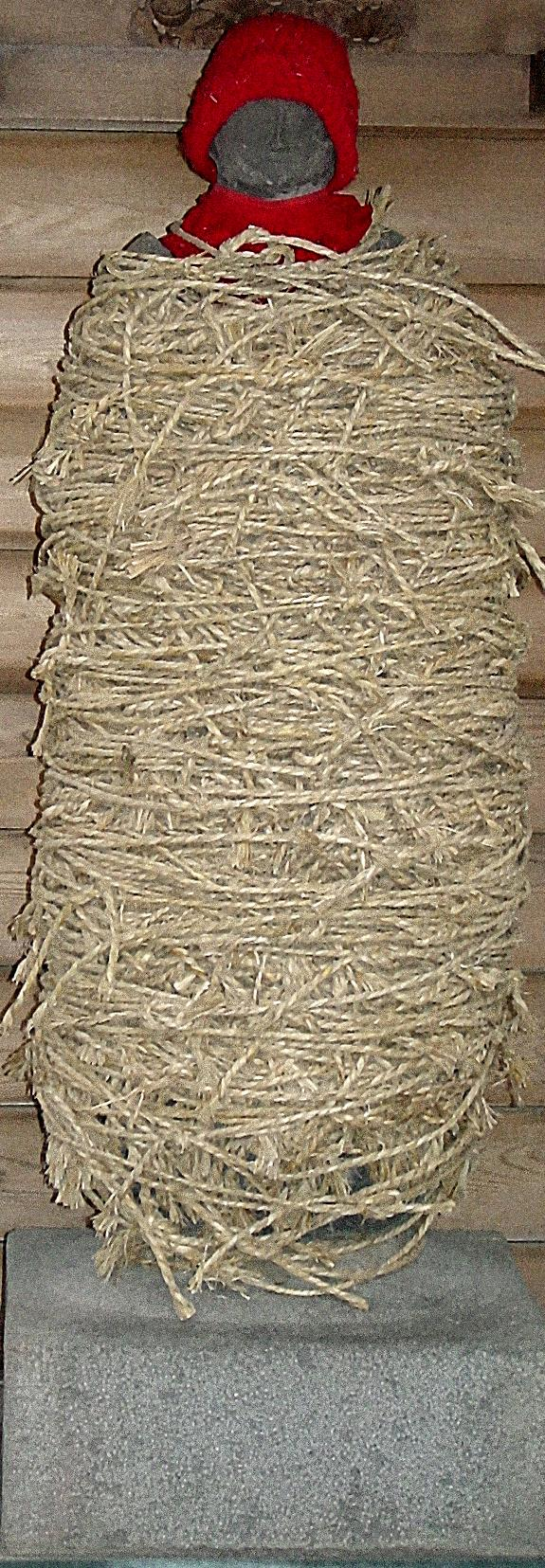
the "Bound Jizo" (Shibarare Jizo).

Narihira-san Tōsen-ji (業平山東泉寺) is a Buddhist temple in Katsushika, Tokyo, near the Yamamoto House and Mizumoto City Park. This temple is famous for the "Bound Jizo" discussed in the Case of the Bound Jizo of Ōoka Tadasuke, a famous judge in Edo (Tokyo) during the Edo period.

== Case of the Bound Jizo ==
In The Case of the Bound Jizo or Suspect Statue, Ōoka Tadasuke was called upon to discover the thief of a cartload of cloth from a local kimono maker. Ōoka ordered a statue of Jizo of the Narihira-san Tōsen-ji, a temple in Tokyo, to be bound and brought forth to be called to answer for dereliction of its custodial duty. When the bound statue arrived in the courtroom, the spectators burst into laughter. Ōoka sternly ordered each spectator to be punished with a token fine for their outburst. Each was ordered to provide a small swatch of cloth as a fine. When the spectators paid their fines, the robbed kimono maker identified the piece of cloth from one spectators as identical to the cloth stolen in the crime. The spectator, who was the actual thief, was arrested, and Ōoka ordered the Jizo statue released as having discharged his duty. In 1925, the statue was removed from downtown Tokyo to a little temple called Nanjo–in on its outskirts. The statue still stands, and is wrapped in rope tied by hopeful victims of thieves. However, the statue is worn almost smooth because of over 200 years of binding.
