= Věnceslava Hrubá-Freiberger =

Czech-German soprano (born 1945)

Věnceslava Hrubá-Freiberger (born 28 September 1945) is a Czech-German soprano.

== Life ==
Born in Dublovice, Freiberger studied at the Prague Conservatory with the singing teachers V. Passerová and L. Michelová. From 1968 to 1970, she was a member of the opera choir at the National Theatre in Prague. Her solo career began in 1970 at the Plzeň Opera. From 1972 to 1988 she was an ensemble member at the Leipzig Opera. After her marriage to the solo violist of the Leipzig Gewandhaus Orchestra, Eberhard Freiberger, she emerged primarily as an interpreter of oratorios and orchestral works by Johann Sebastian Bach and George Frideric Handel, singing in the motets of the Thomanerchor and performing with the Neues Bachisches Collegium Musicum. In 1987, she received a guest performance contract with the Staatsoper Unter den Linden.

Hrubá-Freiberger was a lecturer at the Hochschule für Musik Hanns Eisler Berlin from 1989 to 1991 and professor at the University of Music Franz Liszt Weimar from 1992. She was awarded the Art Prize of the City of Leipzig. She was also awarded the honorary title of Kammersängerin.
