= Věnceslava Hrdličková =

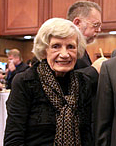
- Born: 15 September 1924; Prague
- Died: 20 January 2016 (aged 91); Prague
- Known for: Sinologist and Historian

Věnceslava Hrdličková also Věna (September 15, 1924, Prague - January 20, 2016, Prague) was a leading Czech sinologist and Japanese historian.

== Biography ==
=== Professional life ===
Věnceslava Hrdličková graduated from the Faculty of Arts of Charles University in 1950, where she also received a doctorate in philosophy, in 1967 the title of candidate of science, and in the early 1990s the position of an associate professor.

Professionally, she was mainly interested in Chinese and Japanese oral literature, or the aesthetics of Chinese and Japanese gardens.

She also received a number of awards, for example in 1994 she was awarded a gold plaque by F. Palacký AS CR for merits in the social sciences, in 1995 a gold medal of the Masaryk Academy of Arts or the Order of the Rising Sun awarded by the Japanese emperor in 2006 for merits in the field of spreading Japanese culture in the Czech Republic. Additional honors included being the honorary chairwoman of the Czech-Japanese Society and was an honorary citizen of Prague.

=== Personal life ===
She is married her husband PhDr. Zdeněk Hrdlička, former ambassador to Japan.

== Publications ==
- History of Chinese Classical Literature (1980)
- The Magic Pumpkin (1981), fairy tales from the Far East, translation from Russian
- Stories of Judge Ōoka (1984), collection of stories about Ōoka Tadasuke
- Demon's Flute (1989), Japanese fairy tales
- The Voices of Spring (1989), an anthology of Chinese short stories from the period following the Cultural Revolution
- Emperor Shenzong's China (1992) together with Zdeněk Hrdlička
- The Art of Japanese Gardens, Prague (1996) together with Zdeněk Hrdlička
- Laughter is my craft (1997), about the Japanese storytelling art of rakugo, together with Zdeněk Hrdlička
- The Art of Chinese Gardens (1998) together with Zdeněk Hrdlička
- The Wisdom of Ancient China (2002)
- The Most Beautiful Chinese Stories (2005)
- The Wonderful World of Bonsai (2008), collaboration with P. Herynek, illustration by Miroslav Pinc, photo by Zdeněk Thoma
- Judgements of Óoka the Judge (2015)
