= Kim Gyo-gak =

Silla prince and Buddhist monk

- Hangul: 김교각
- Hanja: 金喬覺
- RR: Gim Gyogak
- MR: Kim Kyogak

Kim Gyo-gak
- Traditional Chinese: 金喬覺
- Simplified Chinese: 金乔觉
Transcriptions
Standard Mandarin
- Hanyu Pinyin: Jīn Qiáojué
Yue: Cantonese
- Jyutping: Gam^{1} Kiu^{4}-gok^{3}

Kim Gyo-gak (김교각; 金喬覺; 696–794), or Jin Qiaojue in Mandarin, also known by his Buddhist name Jijang (地藏), was a Korean Buddhist monk believed to be the manifestation of Ksitigarbha at Mount Jiuhua, one of the four sacred mountains of Chinese Buddhism, located in Anhui province, China.

Kim Gyo-gak was a Silla prince, who became interested in Buddhism when visiting Tang China at the age of 24. Upon returning to Silla, he decided to become a monk. In 719, he returned to China to cultivate himself at Mount Jiuhua. He died in 794 in Mount Jiuhua, at the age of 99. The monks there believed that Ksitigarbha was reincarnated in him. Mount Jiuhua thereafter became the sacred site of Ksitigarbha.
