= Naihe Bridge =

Mythical bridge in the Chinese underworld

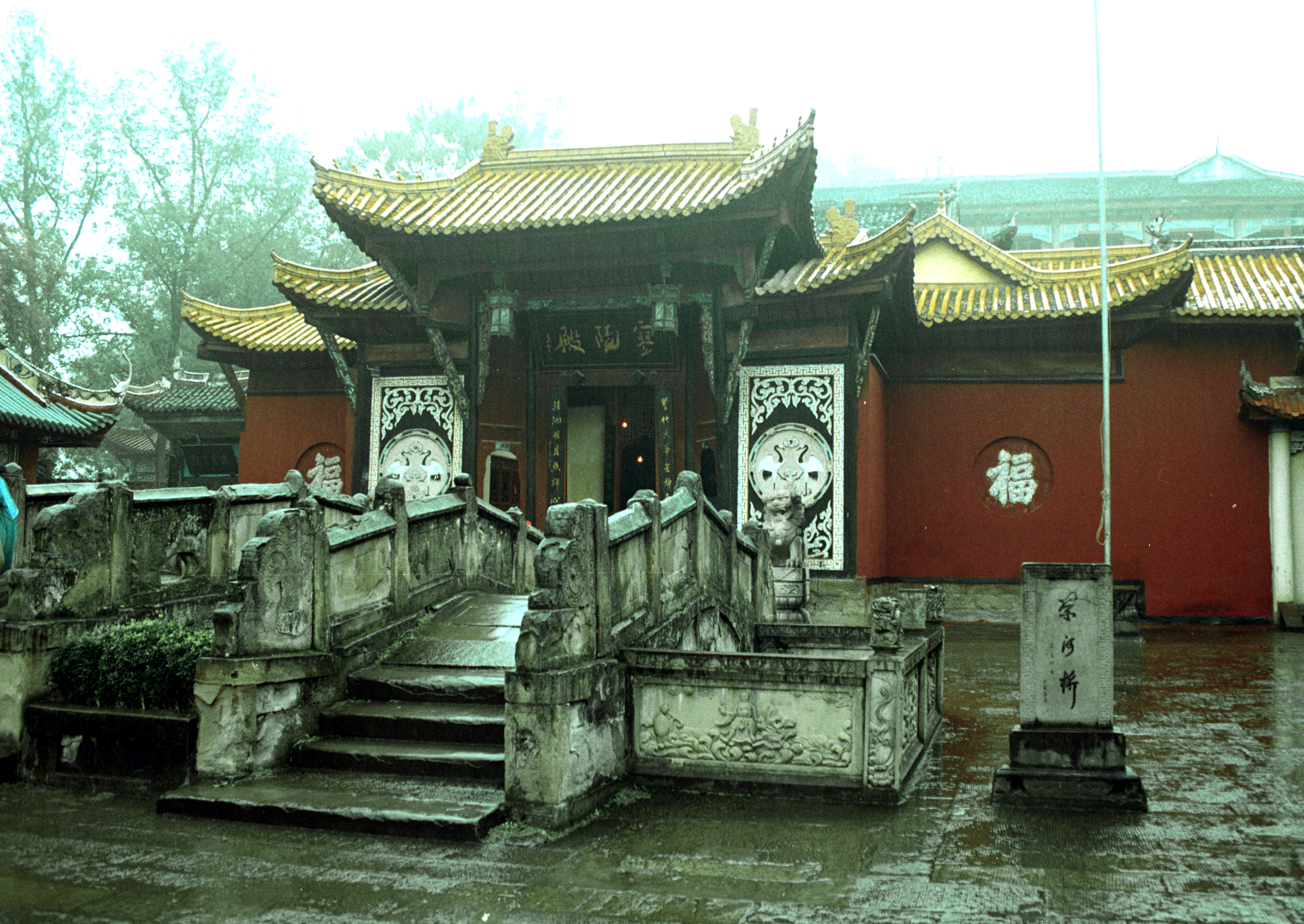
Naihe Bridge in Fengdu Ghost City, Chongqing.

Naihe Bridge (simplified Chinese: 奈何桥; traditional Chinese: 奈何橋; pinyin: Nàihé Qiáo; lit. 'The Bridge of Helplessness'), also called Naihe River Bridge (奈河橋), is a mythical bridge in Chinese folk religion. It crosses the Nai River (奈河), which separates the world of the living from the underworld (Diyu). The souls of the dead are said to cross the bridge on their way to the afterlife. In some stories, good people can cross safely, while evil people fall into the river below.

In some traditions, Meng Po waits near Naihe Bridge and gives the dead a drink that makes them forget their past lives before they are reborn. In the Yuli Baochao (玉歷寶鈔), Naihe Bridge is one of six bridges near the Tenth Court of Hell. Meng Po gives the drink at the Terrace of Forgetfulness (醧忘臺), beyond the bridges.

== In literature ==
The Nai River appears in a Tang dynasty story about Dong Guan (董觀) from Xuanshi Zhi (宣室志). The story is included in Volume 346 of the Taiping Guangji. Dong Guan meets the spirit of a dead monk named Lingxi, who takes him towards the underworld. They reach a narrow river filled with blood. The monk calls it the Nai River and says that it flows from the underworld. No bridge is mentioned.

In Journey to the West, Emperor Taizong of Tang sees three bridges during his visit to the underworld. He crosses a golden bridge, while loyal and good people cross a silver bridge. The third is Naihe Bridge, which stands over a river of blood. It has no railings and is guarded by Ox-Head and Horse-Face. The river is filled with suffering souls, snakes, and iron dogs.

The bridge is also mentioned in the 1925 religious work Dongming Baoji (洞冥寶記). Chapter 19 describes a journey through the Eighth Court of Hell and includes Naihe Bridge in its title.

== Real-world bridges ==
A river called Nai River (渿河) flows through Tai'an, Shandong, near Mount Tai. The nearby Haoli Mountain was traditionally believed to be a place where the souls of the dead gathered. In Shandong Kaogu Lu (山東考古錄), the Qing dynasty scholar Gu Yanwu recorded a bridge across the river near Haoli Mountain. Local people believed that the souls of the dead could not cross it. Worshippers once burned incense and paper offerings there, hoping for protection when they crossed the bridge after death. The old bridges have since been rebuilt.

Another Naihe Bridge stands at Fengdu Ghost City in Chongqing. It consists of three stone arch bridges built during the Yongle period of the Ming dynasty (1403–1424). They were originally part of the Liaoyang Hall complex. The middle bridge is known as Naihe Bridge, while the other two are called the Health Bridge and Wealth Bridge. Beneath them is a pool called the Blood River Pool (血河池). According to local belief, good people can cross the middle bridge safely, while evil people are thrown into the water by ghosts.

== Funeral customs ==
Naihe Bridge also appears in Chinese funeral rites. In Tiediting Suoji (鐵笛亭瑣記), Lin Shu describes a custom in Fujian. On the seventh day of the funeral rites, Daoist priests placed a wooden board over lamps to represent the bridge. They decorated it with banners and made a paper figure of the dead person. The figure was placed in a paper sedan chair, which the family carried across the bridge. The paper objects were then burned.
