= Tubo =

Tubo may refer to:

- Tibet, called Tubo or Tufan in Chinese historical texts
  - Tibetan Empire (618–842)
- Tubo (mythology), an underworld deity in chinese mythology
- Tubo, Abra, the Philippines
- Tubo Fernández (born 1959), Argentine footballer
