= Meng Po =

Goddess in Chinese mythology

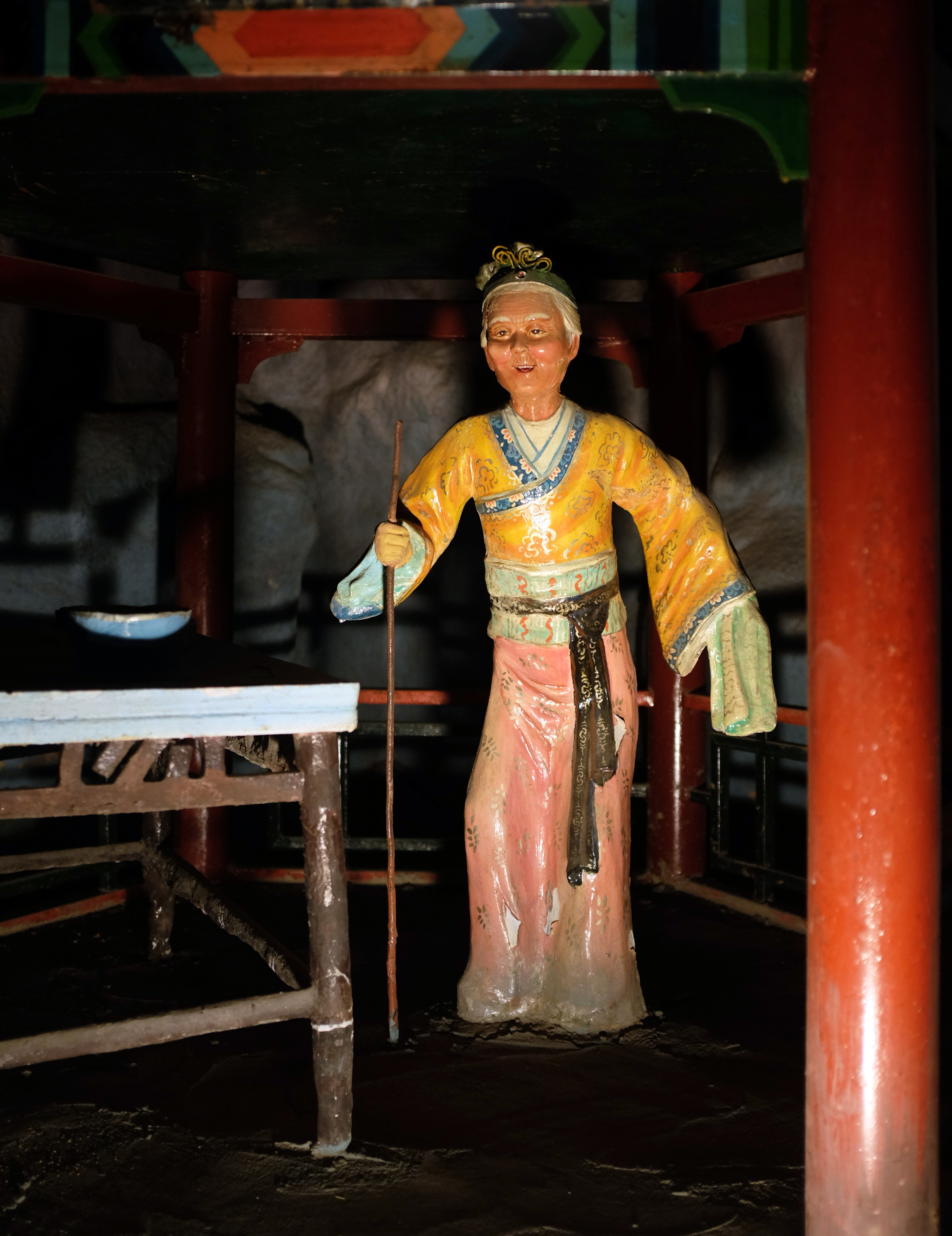
Meng Po statue at Pavilion of Forgetfulness, Haw Par Villa

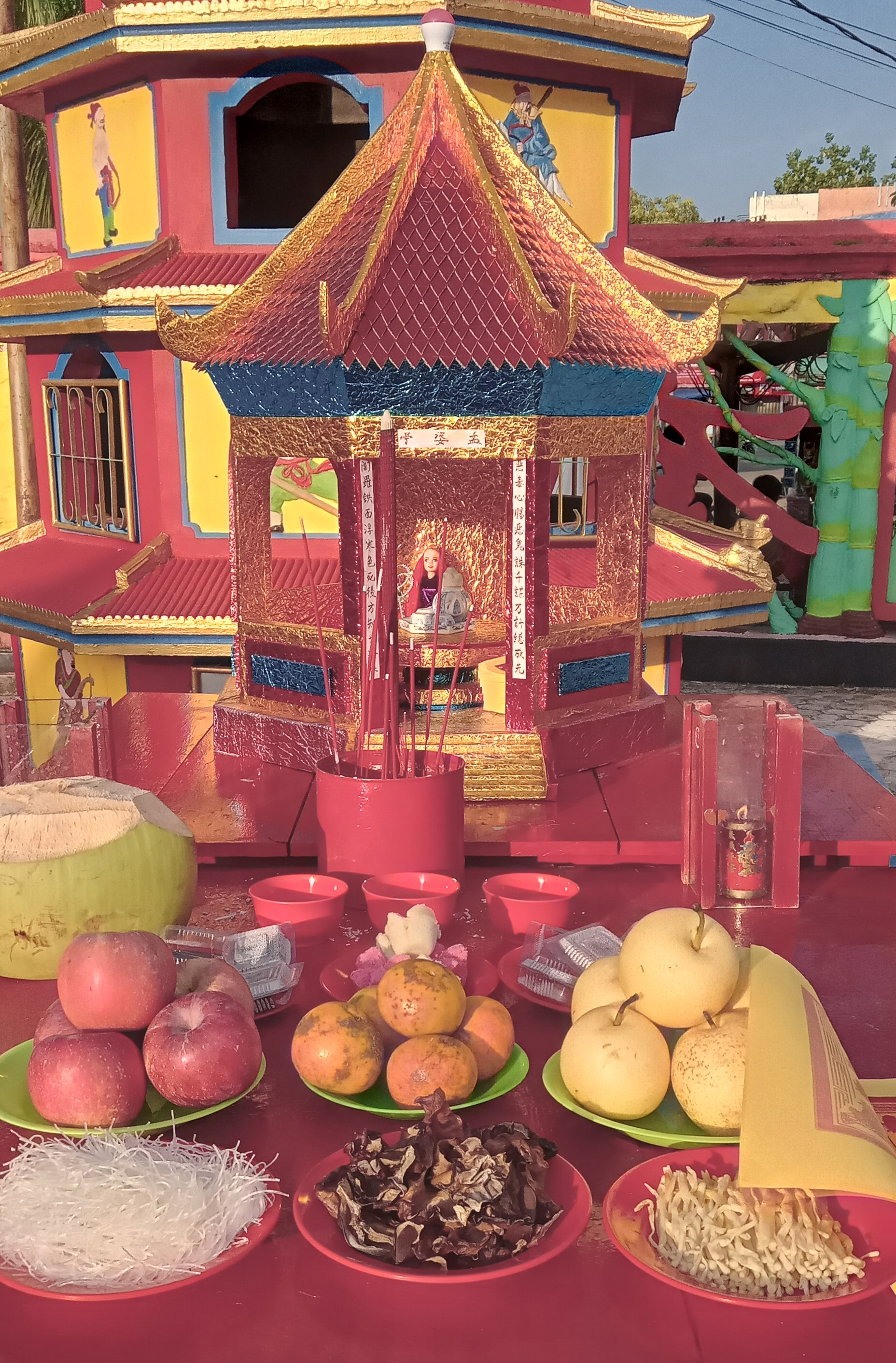
Temporary altar of Meng Po at 2022 Ghost Festival in Bangka Island

Meng Po (Chinese: 孟婆; pinyin: Mèng Pó; Wade–Giles: Meng-p'o; lit. 'Old Lady Meng') is the goddess of oblivion in Chinese mythology, who serves Meng Po Soup on the Bridge of Oblivion or Naihe Bridge (奈何桥; Nàihé qiáo). This soup wipes the memory of the person so they can reincarnate into the next life without the burdens of the previous life. She awaits the dead souls at the entrance of the 9th round Fengdu (丰都; fēng dū).

== Legends ==
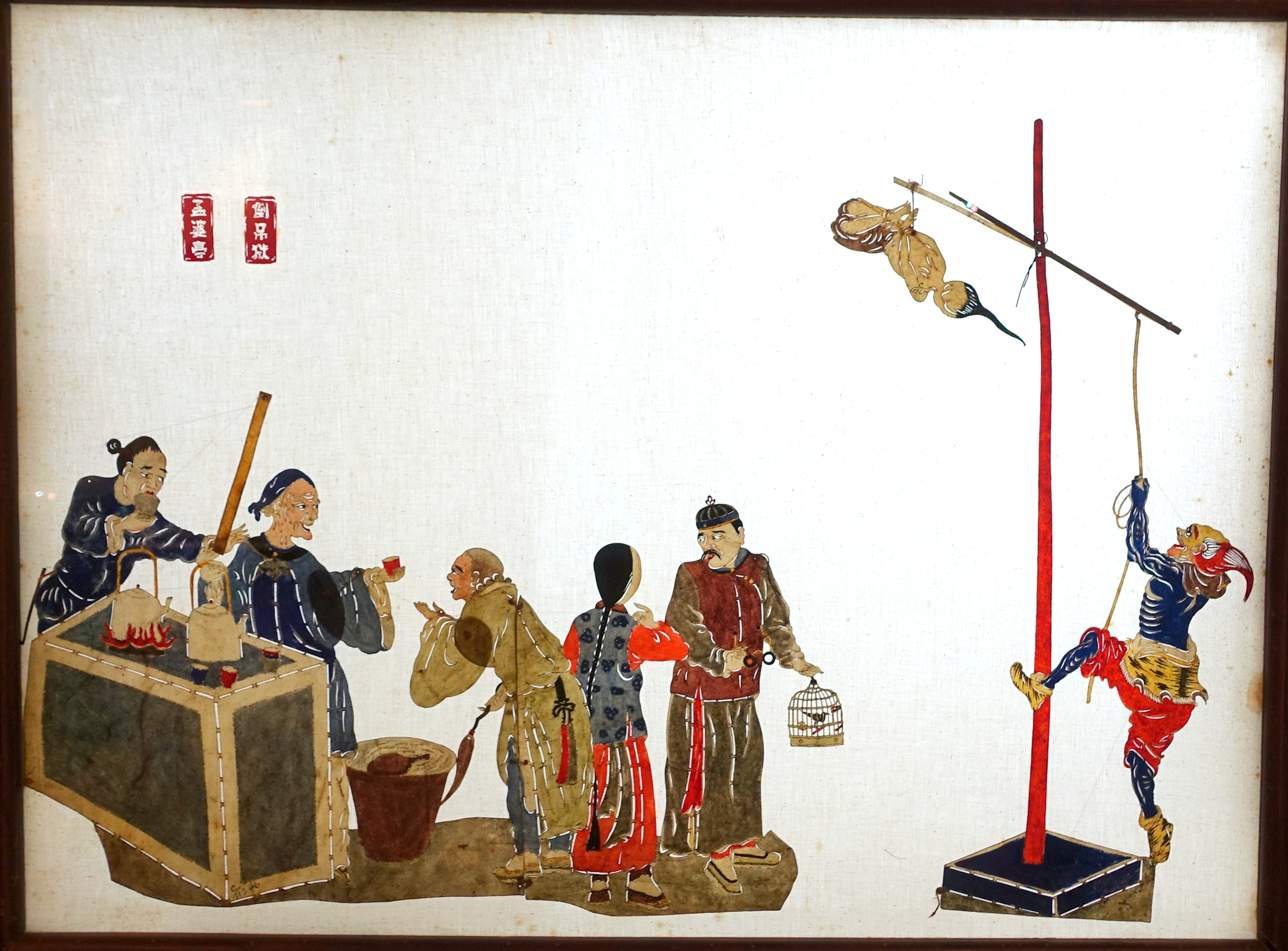
Meng Po cooks Five Flavored Soup

According to Chinese mythology, there exist several realms beneath the Earth. Meng Po serves in Diyu, the Chinese realm of the dead, in the 10th court. It is her task to ensure that souls who are ready to be reincarnated do not remember their previous life or their time in hell.

To this end she collects herbs from various earthly ponds and streams to make her Five Flavored Soup of oblivion (迷魂汤; 迷魂湯; míhúntāng; 'waters of oblivion'). This is given to each soul to drink before they leave Diyu. The brew induces instant and permanent amnesia, and all memory of other lives is lost.

Having been purged of all previous sins and knowledge, the dead spirit is sent to be reborn in a new earthly incarnation according to the karma accrued over their previous lifetimes, and the cycle begins again. In Chinese tradition, there are legends of miracle births, where a newborn is able to speak because the soul of the baby didn't drink the Five Flavored Tea of Forgetfulness. Occasionally people are able to avoid drinking the brew, resulting in past life memories surfacing in children.

In some variations of the myth, the true identity of Meng Po is that of Lady Meng Jiang. After the death of her husband, Meng Jiang found herself unable to reincarnate due to her grief. In order to relieve the pain of life of other spirits, Lady Meng took the initiative to create a bowl of soup that would allow spirits to forget the suffering of their material life.

== In popular culture ==
- The character increased in popularity in 2018 with the romance film The Ferry Man Manjusaka.
- Meng-p'o Macula, one of the equatorial dark regions on Pluto, is named after Meng Po.
- In the 2022 video game Dislyte, the character Jiang Man is blessed with Meng Po's abilities.
- In R.F Kuang's 2025 fantasy novel, Katabasis, the main characters encounter Lady Meng Po, who acts as the guardian of the Lethe. Much like her appearances in mythology, Meng Po brews drinks from the Lethe's waters that erase the memories of those who pass through.

== See also ==
- Yanluo Wang (閻羅王)
- Cheng Huang Gong (城隍公)
- Zhong Kui – Chinese god of vanquishing ghosts (鍾馗)
- Heibai Wuchang – Chinese folk deities (黑白無常)
- Youdu – Capital of Diyu in Chinese mythology (幽都)
- Ox-Head and Horse-Face – Underworld guardians in Asian mythology
- Chinese folk religion
- List of supernatural beings in Chinese folklore
- Lethe – River of forgetfulness in the Greek underworld
- Mnemosyne – Greek goddess of memory
