= Wufang Guidi =

Wufang Guidi (Chinese: 五方鬼帝; pinyin: Wǔfāng Guǐdì; lit. 'Five Directional Ghost Emperors') are a group of underworld gods in Taoism and Chinese folk religion. They rule over ghosts in the five directions: east, south, west, north, and center. Their names and the mountains they rule are recorded in the Daoist text Yuanshi Shangzhen Zhongxian Ji (元始上真眾仙記), also known as Zhenzhong Shu (枕中書).

== Origins ==
The Five Ghost Emperors appear in Yuanshi Shangzhen Zhongxian Ji, a Daoist book that lists the names and homes of gods and immortals. The book was once said to have been written by Ge Hong, a Daoist scholar of the Jin dynasty. Later studies found that it was probably written by a follower of the Shangqing School during the Northern and Southern dynasties. The book is preserved in the Daozang (道藏), the collection of Daoist scriptures.

The book includes many figures from Chinese history among the gods. The names of Zhang Heng (張衡) and Ji Kang (嵇康) appear among the Five Ghost Emperors. These figures were given places in the Daoist world of gods and spirits, with each holding a title and ruling a certain area.

The Five Ghost Emperors were part of an early Daoist belief about the underworld. The Buddhist belief in the Ten Kings of Hell became common in China much later. Over time, the two traditions influenced each other. Daoist texts also began to include the Ten Kings, but they kept their own names and titles.

== Names and directions ==
Yuanshi Shangzhen Zhongxian Ji gives the names and homes of the Five Ghost Emperors. Some directions have two rulers rather than one.

- Eastern Ghost Emperor (東方鬼帝): Cai Yulei (蔡鬱壘), who rules Taoqiu Mountain (桃丘山).
- Southern Ghost Emperor (南方鬼帝): Du Ziren (杜子仁), who rules Luofu Mountain (羅浮山).
- Western Ghost Emperors (西方鬼帝): Zhao Wenhe (趙文和) and Wang Zhenren (王真人), who rule Bozhong Mountain (嶓冢山).
- Northern Ghost Emperors (北方鬼帝): Zhang Heng (張衡) and Yang Yun (楊雲), who rule Luofeng Mountain (羅酆山).
- Central Ghost Emperors (中央鬼帝): Zhou Qi (周乞) and Ji Kang (嵇康), who rule Baodu Mountain (抱犢山).

The text also says that Du Ziren rules over spirits called Qiang and Man ghosts (羌蠻鬼). Some later accounts give Taozhi Mountain (桃止山) as the home of the Eastern Ghost Emperor instead of Taoqiu Mountain.

== In Taoist beliefs ==
The Five Ghost Emperors belong to the Daoist world of the dead. Early Daoist texts placed ghosts and other spirits under the rule of gods. These gods were given names, ranks, and duties, much like officials in a government. The Five Ghost Emperors were part of this system.

Later Daoist beliefs also gave an important place to Fengdu Dadi, the ruler of the northern underworld. Luofeng Mountain, the home of the Northern Ghost Emperors, became an important place in stories about the dead. Other Daoist texts describe it as the home of gods and spirits who rule the underworld.
