= Youdu =

Capital of Diyu in Chinese mythology

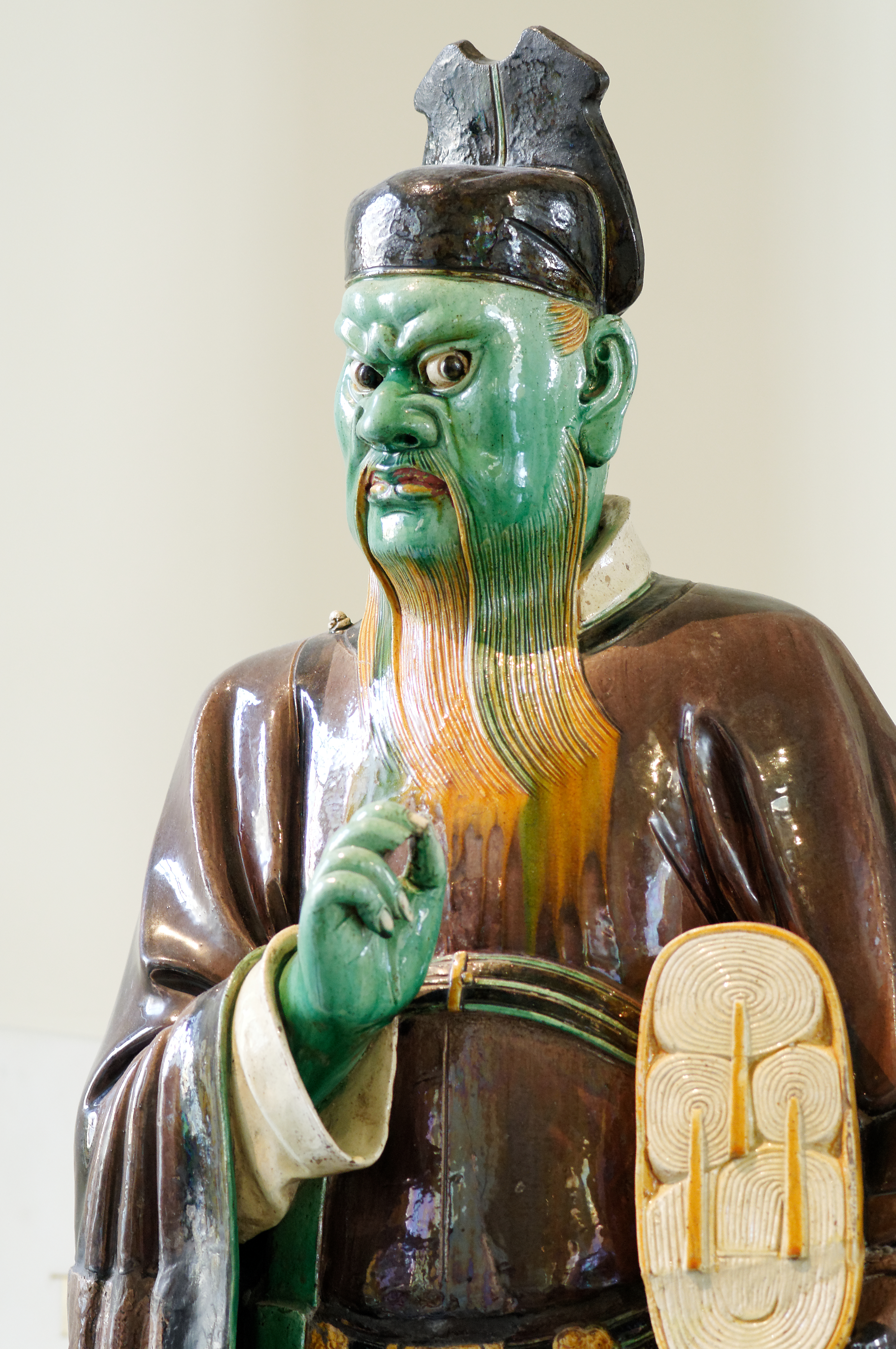
- An assistant to the Judge of Hell, figure from a judgement group, Ming dynasty.
- Chinese: 幽都
- Literal meaning: dark capital
Transcriptions
Standard Mandarin
- Hanyu Pinyin: yōudū
- Wade–Giles: yu1 tu1
Yue: Cantonese
- Yale Romanization: yāu-dōu
Southern Min
- Hokkien POJ: iu-to͘
Middle Chinese
- Middle Chinese: /ʔiɪu tuo/

Youdu (Chinese: 幽都; pinyin: yōudū) in Chinese mythology is the capital of Hell, or Diyu. Among the various other geographic features believed of Diyu, the capital city has been thought to be named Youdu. It is generally conceived as being similar to a typical Chinese capital city, such as Chang'an, but surrounded with and pervaded with darkness.

== Name ==
"You" (幽) in Chinese means "dark". "Du" (都) means "capital". Thus, Youdu is the Dark Capital. Among other meanings, You can mean "hidden", "secluded", and is in particular used to indicate the underworld.

== Location ==
Youdu is located under the earth, in the Region of Darkness, also known as Diyu, or the Yellow Springs. The general ruler of this realm is Houtu, but there are many other functionaries which have been believed to inhabit this region, and with the more important individuals being located in Youdu, as the capital city and seat of government.

== Description ==
Youdu has been described in various texts, as well as being depicted in art. Sometimes differences exist according to the religious affiliation of the text, for example whether more Buddhist, folk-oriented, or secular. Being located in the darkness underground is the most common feature. Generally, lighting is provided by torches and candles. Youdu may be the best-lit area of Diyu.

=== Inhabitants ===
Youdu is the home or official residence of various deities, and also the location of their official offices or palaces. The souls of the dead are their fellow inhabitants and subjects. There are also many subordinate demons which serve to carry out the commands of the judges. Many of these are concerned with punishing or processing the souls of the dead for reincarnation. The sovereign deity is generally considered to be Yanluo Wang. Beneath him in rank ten other kings serve as judges of the souls of the dead.

=== Creatures ===
Various creatures also inhabit Youdu, including Tu Bo (土伯), the warden of Youdu under the rule of Houtu, while some argue that Tu Bo itself is the primordial overlord of the underworld; Diting, the steed of Di Zang, which can determine truth from falsehood.

=== Places ===
Youdu is generally conceived of as similar to a typical historical Chinese capital city, such as Chang'an. Thus, it has a city wall, palaces, a hall of justice, and various residences for the ghosts of the dead. Especially important is the housing for the official records, which allow the various judges to determine proper punishments, or occasionally to allow someone who dies before their officially allotted time has expired to be returned to life. Especially important in this regard are the place of Yanluo Wang and the Ten Courts of Justice.

== Events ==
Youdu is a major scene of action in various myths, as well as literary works derived from the myths, legends, or religious descriptions or depictions. In the novel Journey to the West, Sun Wukong visits it repeatedly.

== See also ==
- Avici, the Hell of Non-returning, to which the worst sinners are sent
- Chinese mythology, a general article on Chinese mythology
- Cheng Huang Gong (City God), the spirits of those who died in the particular area has to first report to City God of the area
- Diyu, the underground realm of the dead
- Fengdu Ghost City
- Heibai Wuchang, constables who escort the spirits of the dead to the underworld.
- Hou Tu, Mother Earth and Overlord of all the Earthly Deities
- Meng Po, the Goddess who served the soup to enable one to lose all past memories before entering rebirth
- Ox-Head and Horse-Face Guards, guardians of the underworld
- Yama (Buddhism)
- Yanluo Wang, Supreme Judge of the fifth court in underworld
- Zhong Kui, Powerful Deity who is the vanquisher of demons and evil spirits

== Works cited ==
- Yang, Lihui, et al. (2005). Handbook of Chinese Mythology. New York: Oxford University Press. ISBN 978-0-19-533263-6
