= Fengdu Ghost City =

Religious complex in China

Coordinates: 29°53′11″N 107°43′33″E

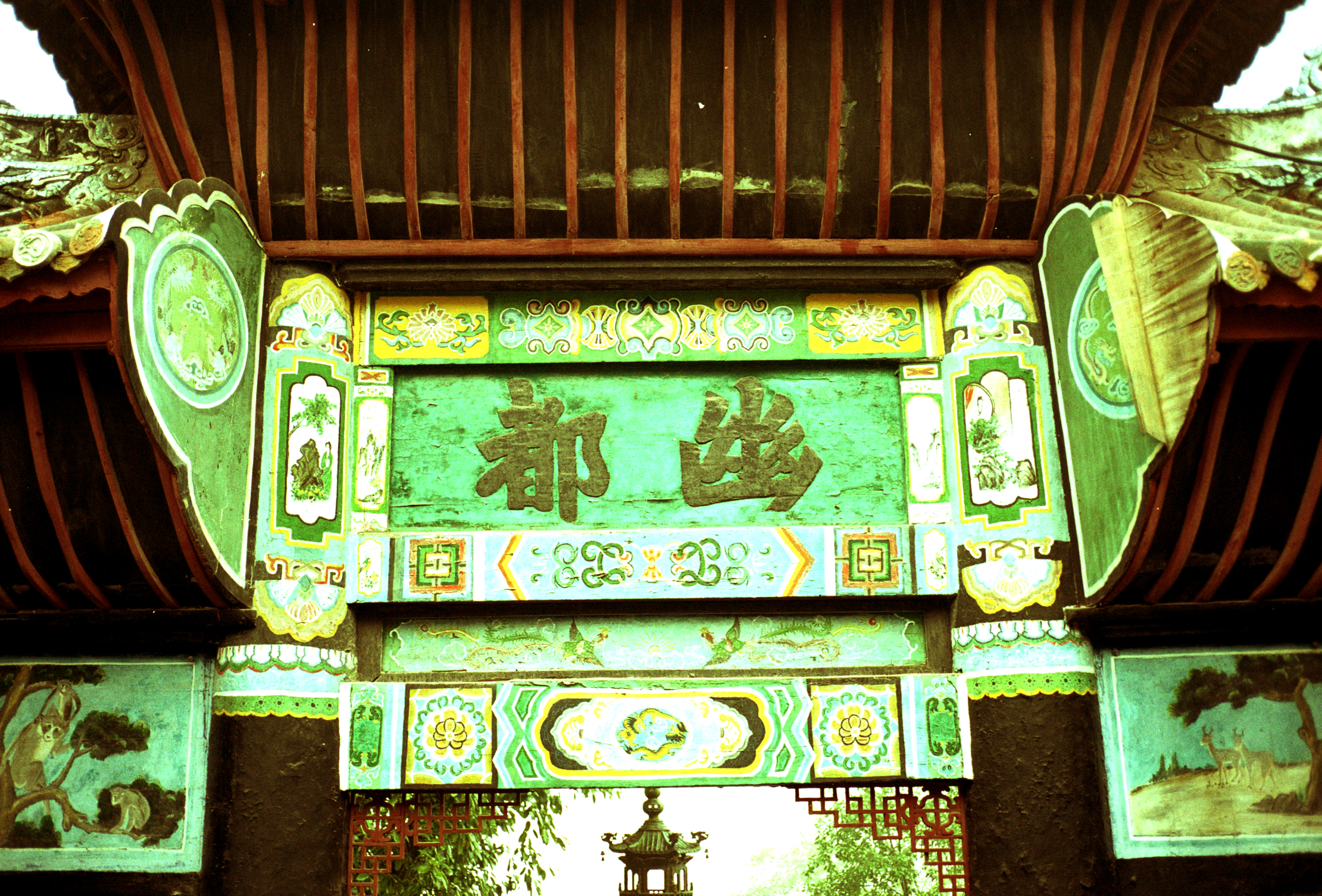
The gate to Youdu (right to left: 幽都), the capital of Diyu.

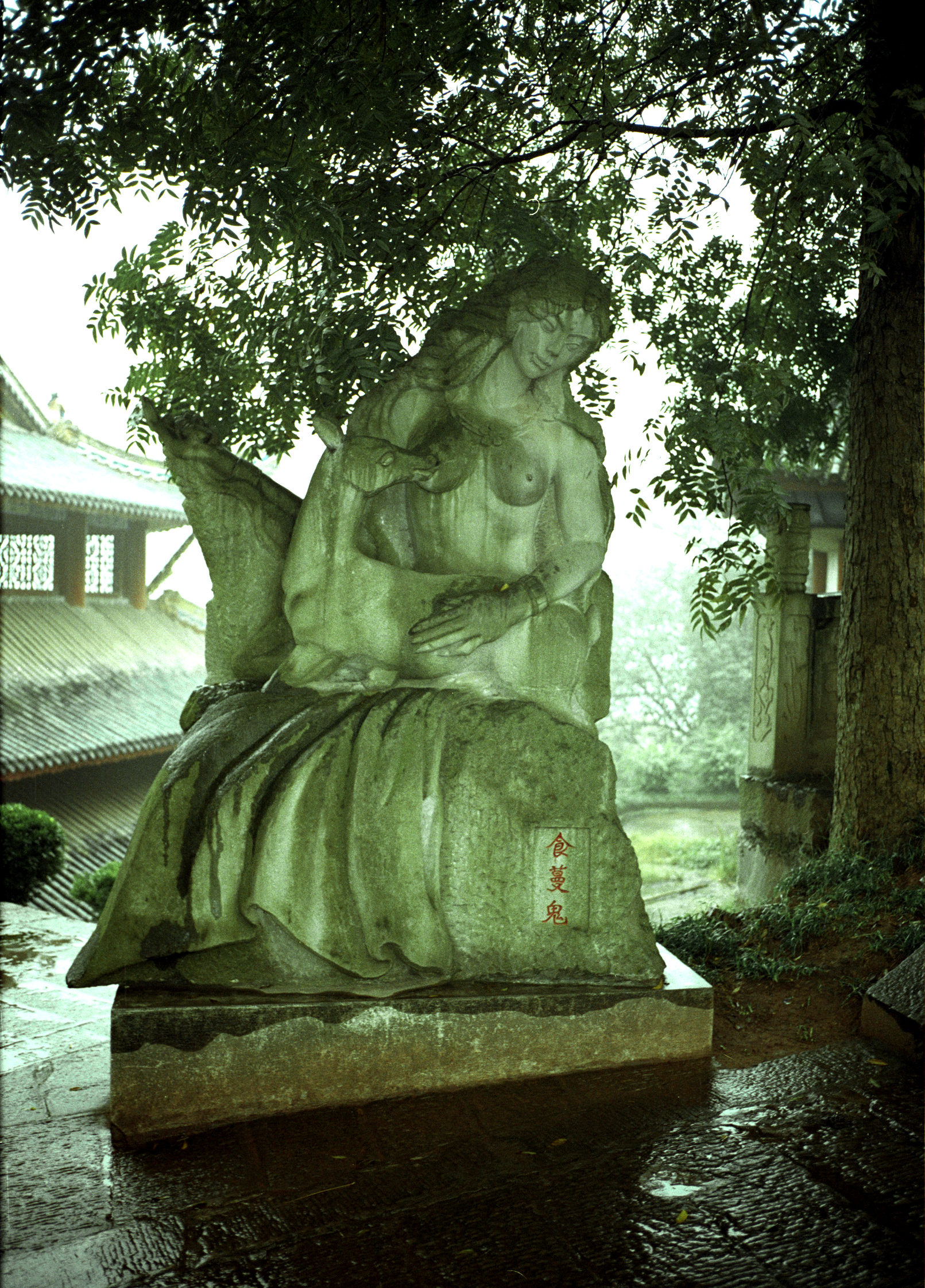
Statue of the "wreath-eating ghost" (食蔓鬼). In legend, this ghost was a girl who adorned herself with flower wreaths she stole from statues of the Buddha. After she died, as punishment, she was not allowed to feast on food offerings from living people and could only feed on flower wreaths.

Fengdu Ghost City (simplified Chinese: 丰都鬼城; traditional Chinese: 豐都鬼城; pinyin: Fēngdū Guǐ Chéng, originally 酆都鬼城) is a large complex of shrines, temples and monasteries dedicated to the afterlife located on the Ming mountain, in Fengdu County, Chongqing municipality, China. It is situated about 170 kilometres (110 mi) downstream of Chongqing on the north bank of the Yangtze River.

== Description ==
The site consists of temples, buildings, structures, dioramas, and statues depicting Diyu and Naraka, the underworlds of Chinese mythology and Buddhism. It is designed to resemble Youdu, the capital of Diyu. Many of the temples and shrines contain paintings and sculptures depicting punishments inflicted on sinners in the afterlife.

Following the construction of the Three Gorges Dam and the rise in the river's water level, the site became separated from the county seat of Fengdu. The modern town was subsequently rebuilt on higher ground along the south bank of the river.

Fengdu Ghost City is now a popular tourist attraction. River cruise boats regularly stop at its docks, and visitors are transported partway up the mountain by vehicle. From there, they can take an outdoor escalator or climb the remaining distance on foot.

== History and legend ==
The site's history goes back nearly two thousand years, at least in legends. It focuses on the afterlife and combines the beliefs of Confucianism, Taoism and Buddhism. It is mentioned in several classic Chinese works of literature like Journey to the West, Investiture of the Gods and Strange Stories from a Chinese Studio.

According to legend, Fengdu became known as the "Ghost City" during the Eastern Han dynasty, when the immortals Yin Changsheng and Wang Fangping practiced Daoist cultivation on Mount Pingdu. Their surnames were later combined in popular folklore as Yinwang (陰王), which was understood to mean the "King of the Underworld." Early Daoist texts, however, placed the realm of Fengdu Dadi on the mythical Mount Luofeng in the far north. By the Song dynasty, popular belief had identified Mount Luofeng with Mount Pingdu in Fengdu County, leading the county to be regarded as the earthly capital of Fengdu Dadi. Temples dedicated to the deity and his Underworld court, including the Hall of the Son of Heaven (天子殿), were later established there.

== Attractions ==
According to Chinese belief, the dead must pass three tests before entering the next life. The first is the Bridge of Helplessness, a stone bridge built during the Ming dynasty. The bridge has three arches, although only the middle arch is used for the test. According to tradition, the rules for crossing vary by sex, age, and marital status. Demons judge each person: the virtuous are allowed to cross, while the wicked are pushed into the water below. Today, the ritual is reenacted for tourists by performers dressed as demons. The second test takes place at Ghost-Torturing Pass, where the dead are judged by Yanluo Wang. The site features large sculptures of demons. The third test is held at the entrance to Tianzi Palace, where the dead must stand on one foot on a designated stone for three minutes. According to legend, the virtuous succeed, while the wicked fail and are condemned to hell.

Tianzi Palace is the largest and oldest building in the complex, dating back about 300 years.

A later addition is the Last Glance to Home Tower, also known as the Home Viewing Pavilion, built in 1985. According to legend, it marks the place where the dead take a final look at their homes and families before entering the Underworld.

== See also ==
- Yanluo Wang (閻羅王)
- Cheng Huang Gong (城隍公)
- Zhong Kui (鍾馗)
- Meng Po (孟婆)
- Heibai Wuchang (黑白無常)
- Ox-Head and Horse-Face Guards (牛頭馬面)
- Youdu (幽都)
- Snowy Jade Cave, a cave 12 km away
