= Ox-Head and Horse-Face =

Underworld guardians in Asian mythology

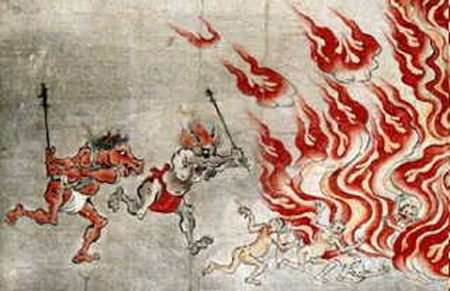
Ox-Head and Horse-Face in the Hell Scroll at Seattle Asian Art Museum

Ox-Head (simplified Chinese: 牛头; traditional Chinese: 牛頭; pinyin: Niútóu; Wade–Giles: niu^{2}-t'ou^{2}) and Horse-Face (simplified Chinese: 马面; traditional Chinese: 馬面; pinyin: Mǎmiàn; Wade–Giles: ma^{3}-mien^{4}) are two guardians or types of guardians of the underworld in Chinese mythology. As indicated by their names, both have the bodies of men, but Ox-Head has the head of an ox while Horse-Face has the face of a horse. They are the first beings a dead soul encounters upon entering the underworld; in many stories they directly escort the newly dead to the underworld.

== Role ==
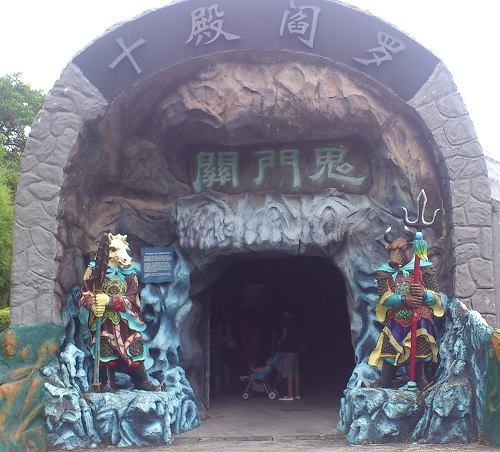
Entrance to the "Ten Courts of Hell" attraction in Haw Par Villa, Singapore. The Ox-Headed (right) and Horse-Faced (left) Hell Guards stand guard at the entrance.

In their duties as guardians of Diyu, the realm of the dead, their role is to capture human souls who have reached the end of their earthly existence and bring them before the courts of Hell. Souls are then rewarded or punished based on the actions performed in their lifetime.

Ox-Head and Horse-Face also play the role of messengers of the king of hell, Yanluo Wang (閻羅王). In one legend, Ox-Head was created by the king when he took pity on a recently deceased ox who had worked hard all his life, so the king made him one of his faithful servants.

== Chinese mythology ==
In the Chinese classical novel Journey to the West, Ox-Head and Horse-Face are among the underworld denizens overpowered by Sun Wukong after his soul is dragged to hell in his sleep. He then crosses out his name and those of all non-human primates on earth from the record of living souls, hence granting a second level of immortality to himself and general immortality to his monkey children.

== Japanese mythology ==
In Japanese mythology, Ox-Head and Horse-Face are known as Gozu (牛頭) and Mezu (馬頭), respectively. Collectively, they are referred to with the yojijukugo Gozumezu (牛頭馬頭). They appear in classical Japanese literature such as the Konjaku Monogatarishū and Taiheiki. In The Tale of the Heike, they appear in an ominous dream of Taira no Tokiko.

== Vietnamese mythology ==
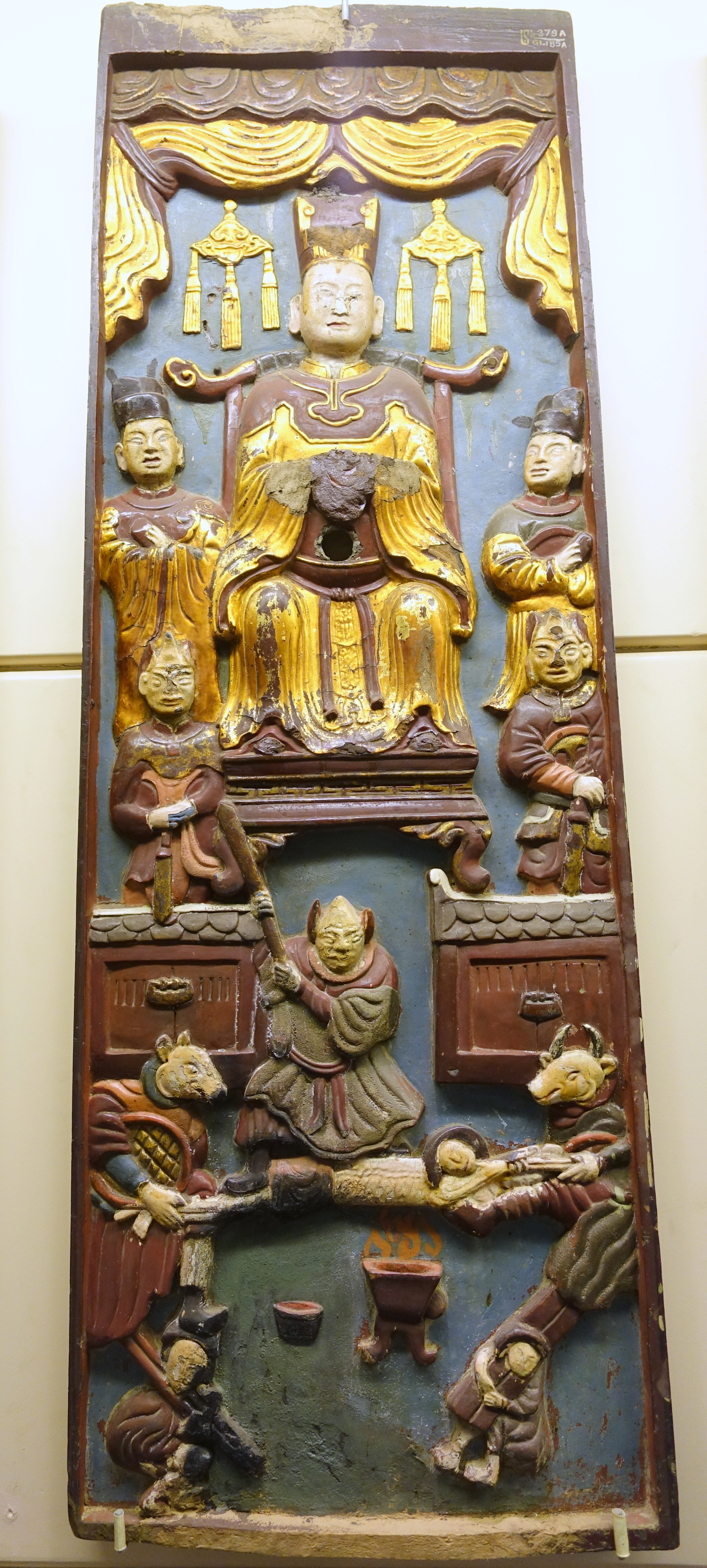
The Ox-Head and Horse-Face in a painting of a hell scene

In Vietnamese mythology, the Ox-Head and Horse-Face are called Đầu Trâu and Mặt Ngựa or Ngưu Đầu and Mã Diện. They are also responsible for leading people's souls to the underworld after death.

== Gallery ==
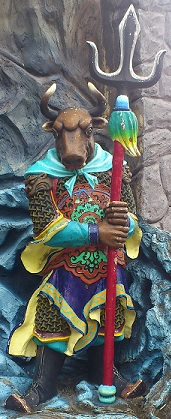
Close-up of the statue of Ox-Head at Haw Par Villa, Singapore.

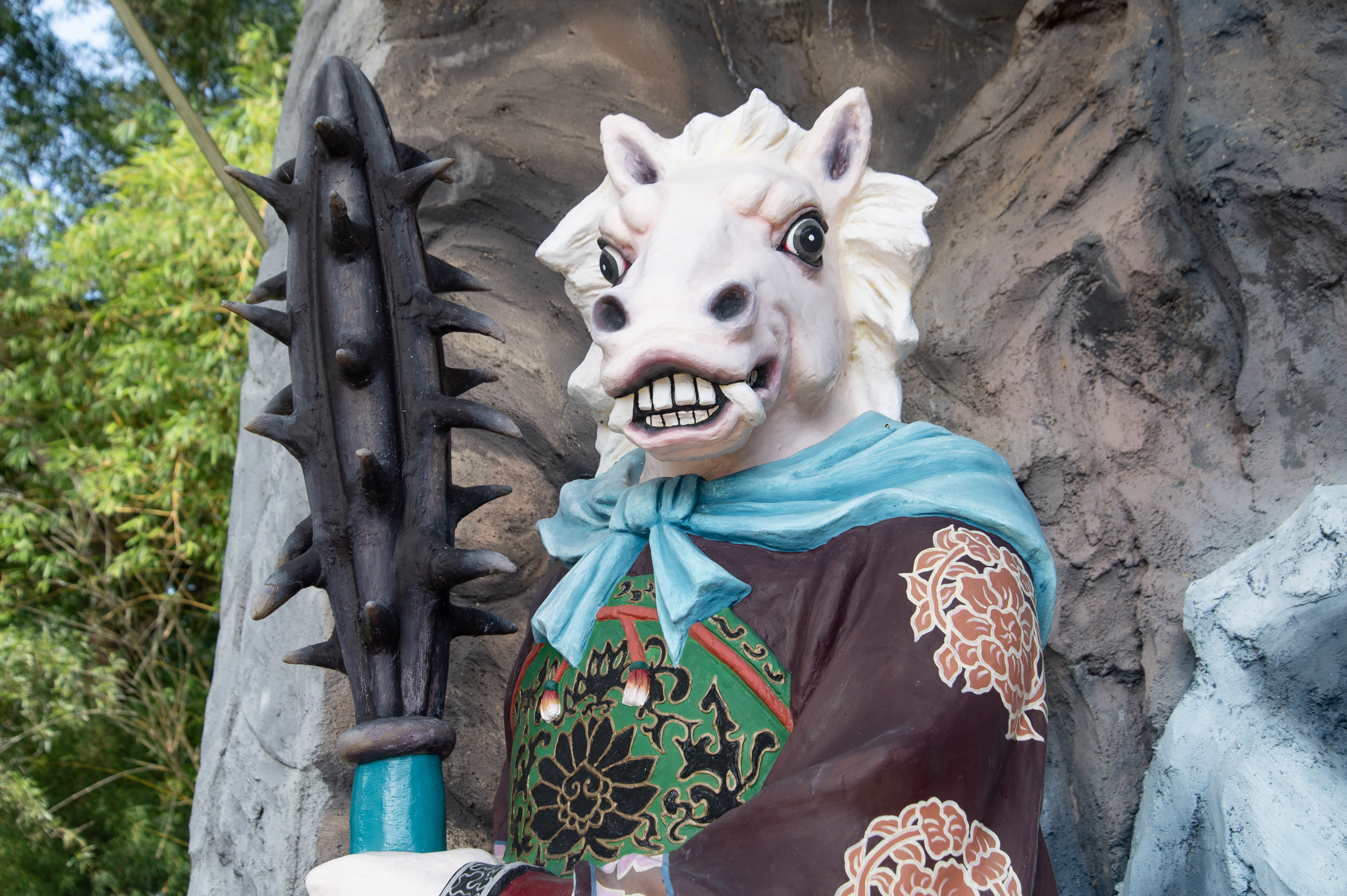
Close-up of the statue of Horse-Face at Haw Par Villa, Singapore.

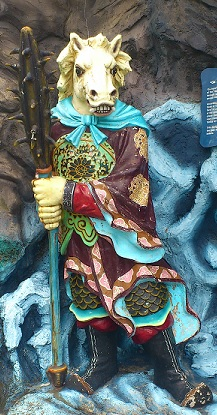
Statue of Horse-Face at Haw Par Villa, Singapore.

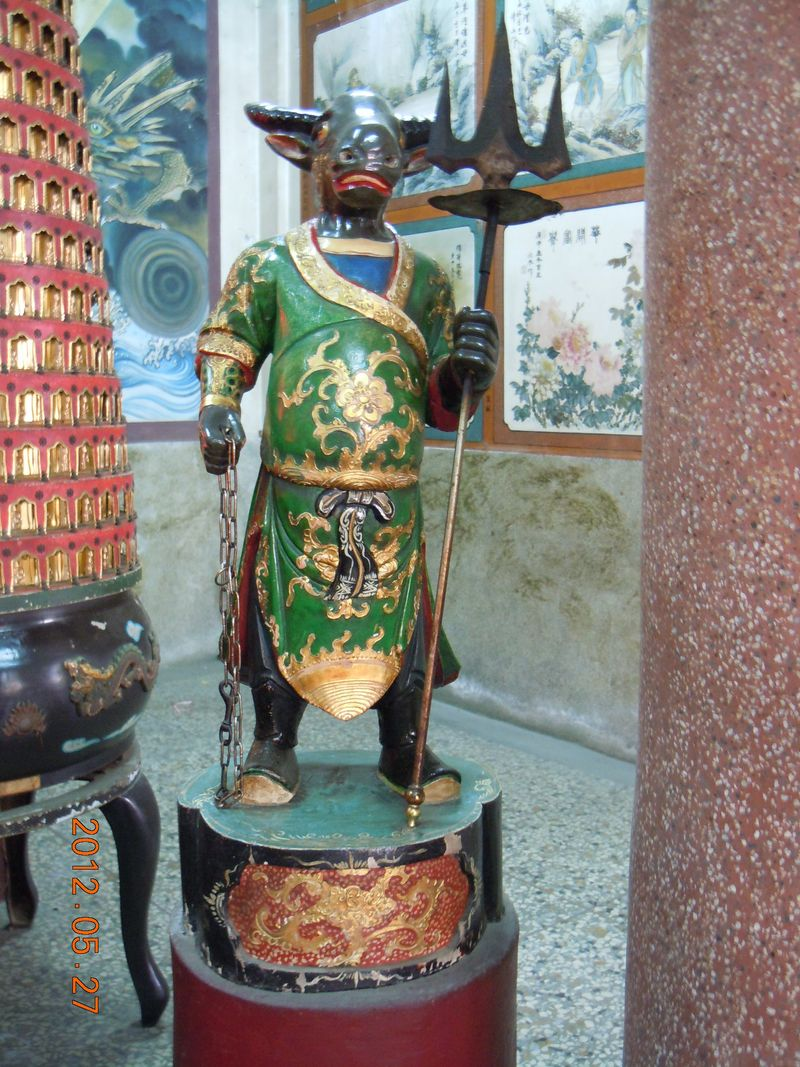
Statue of Ox-Head in Taiwan.

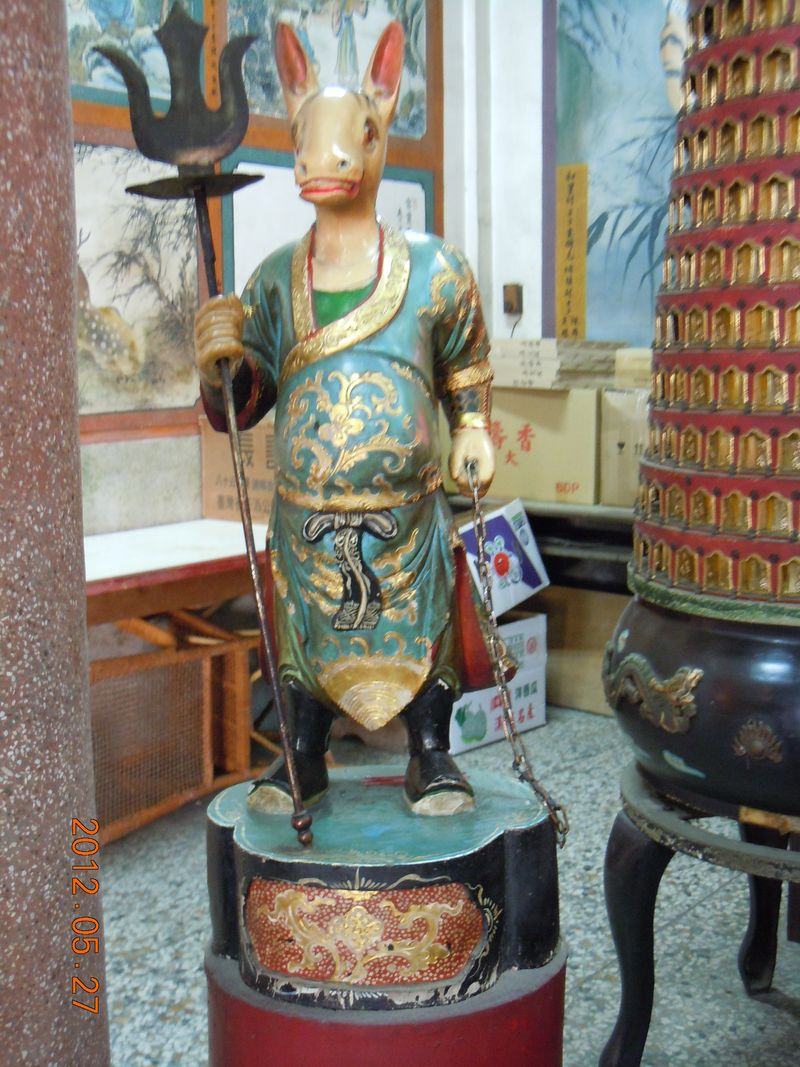
Statue of Horse-Face in Taiwan.

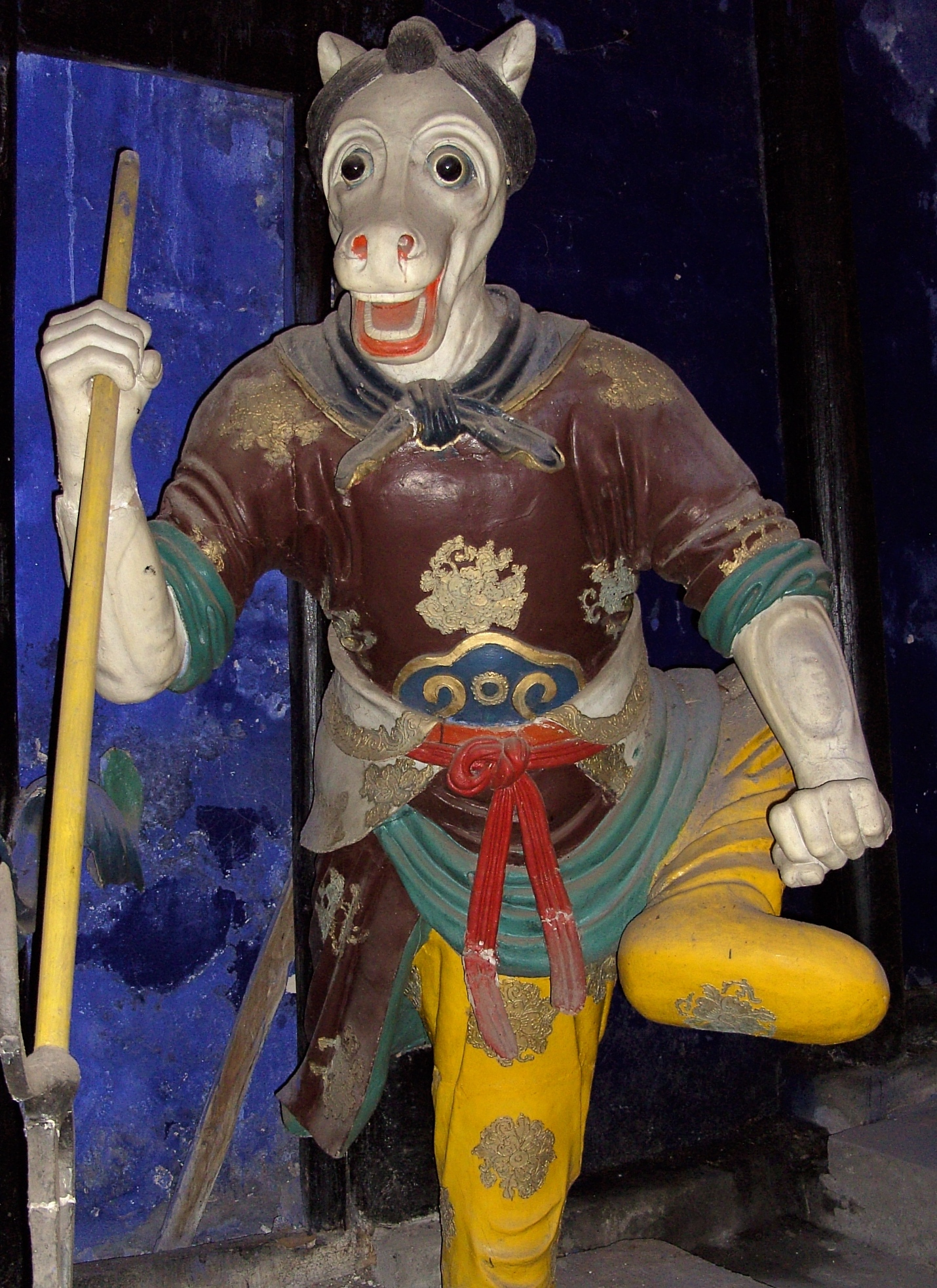
Statue of Horse-face, Fengdu Ghost City.

== See also ==
- Alexiares and Anicetus, twin-sons of Heracles/Hercules and Hebe/Juventas; alongside their father, they are the guardians of the gates of Mount Olympus.
- Castor and Pollux
- Chenghuangshen (城隍公)
- Chinese folk religion
- Gozu Tennō
- Heibai Wuchang (黑白無常)
- Janus
- Kushiel
- List of supernatural beings in Chinese folklore
- Lion-Face
- Lugal-irra and Meslamta-ea
- Meng Po (孟婆)
- Nio
- Youdu (幽都)
- Zabaniyya
- Zhong Kui (鍾馗)
