= The Ferry Man Manjusaka =

2018 film by Ju Xingmao

- 灵魂摆渡·黄泉
- Directed by: Ju Xingmao
- Starring: He Hua; Richards Wang; Yu Yi; Yue Lina MengNi; Ni Hongjie; Ju Xingmao; Zhao Hengxuan; Lu Jiani
- Distributed by: iQiyi
- Release date: February 1, 2018
- Country: China
- Language: Mandarin

The Ferry Man Manjusaka (Chinese: 灵魂摆渡·黄泉篇) is a 2018 Chinese fantasy romance film starring He Hua, Richards Wang, Yu Yi, Yue Lina Meng, Ni Hongjie, Ju Xingmao, Zhao Hengxuan and Lu Jiani. The film was released on iQiyi on 1 February 2018 and has already accumulated 42 million RMB in shared revenue, with a revenue size and popularity comparable with films shown at the same time in traditional cinemas.

== Cast ==
- He Hua as San Qi
- Richards Wang as Chang Sheng
- Yue Lina as Meng Qi, Old Lady Meng
- Yu Yi as Zhao Li
- Ni Hongjie as Sun Shangxiang, Ghost Guard
- Ju Xingmao as Wang Xiaolu, Ghost
- Zhao Hengxuan as Qi Yang
- Lu Jiani as Hua Ningxue
