= Fengdu Dadi =

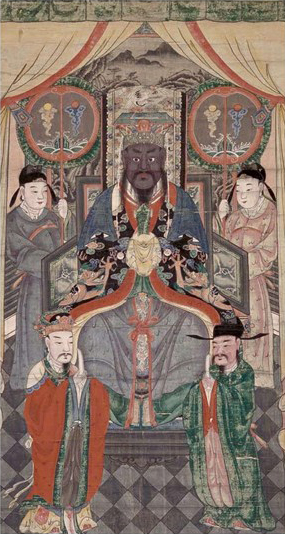
Qing dynasty painting of Fengdu Dadi

Fengdu Dadi (Chinese: 酆都大帝; pinyin: Fēngdū Dàdì), also known as the Great Emperor of Fengdu, Great Emperor of Beiyin (北陰大帝), or Beidi (北帝), is a god in Daoism and Chinese folk religion. He is believed to rule the Underworld and all ghosts and spirits. Daoist texts say that he lives on Mount Luofeng (羅酆山), a mythical mountain in the far north. The mountain was later linked to Fengdu County in present-day Chongqing, which was once part of Sichuan. Fengdu became known as the "Ghost City" (鬼城).

Other gods linked to the Underworld include the Great Emperor of Dongyue, Kṣitigarbha (Dizang), and Yanluo Wang. Fengdu Dadi is mainly a Daoist god, while Kṣitigarbha and Yanluo Wang also have important roles in Buddhist beliefs.

== Origins ==
Early Daoist books tell of Mount Luofeng (羅酆山), a mountain in the far north where the dead were believed to live. The Yuanshi Shangzhen Zhongxian Ji (元始上真眾仙記) names five Ghost Emperors who ruled over the dead. Zhang Heng (張衡) and Yang Yun (楊雲) were the Northern Ghost Emperors and ruled from Mount Luofeng. The book was once said to have been written by Ge Hong, but it is now thought to be a later work from the Southern and Northern Dynasties.

During the Southern Dynasties, Tao Hongjing wrote about Mount Luofeng in the Zhen'gao (真誥). He described six palaces on the mountain and six more inside it. They were called the Six Heavens (六天). The palaces were places where the dead were judged. Their ruler was called the Northern Great Emperor (北大帝), another name for Fengdu Dadi.

In the Zhenling Weiye Tu (真靈位業圖), Tao Hongjing placed Fengdu Dadi in the seventh and lowest rank of the Daoist gods. He called him Beiyin Dadi (北陰大帝) and gave his name as Yandi Dating-shi (炎帝大庭氏), also called Qingjia (慶甲). The book calls him the ancestor of all ghosts and spirits (天下鬼神之宗). He ruled Mount Luofeng for 3,000 years before another ruler took his place. The book also names King Wen of Zhou and Duke Huan of Qi as officials under the Northern Emperor.

Mount Luofeng was a mountain in Daoist stories. By the Song dynasty, people had begun to place the Underworld in Fengdu County, which was then part of Sichuan and is now in Chongqing. Mount Pingdu (平都山) in Fengdu was known as a Daoist blessed land (福地). Local stories say that two Han dynasty Daoists, Yin Changsheng (陰長生) and Wang Fangping (王方平), practised Daoism there and became immortals.

One local story says that people joined the surnames Yin (陰) and Wang (王) to make Yin Wang (陰王). The name was later understood to mean "King of the Underworld". However, historian Gan Daming has questioned this story. He argues that there is no clear historical proof that the name came from this mistake.

People also linked Fengdu County with the Underworld because of the similar names Luofeng and Fengdu. Temples and halls for the gods of the dead were built on Mount Pingdu. One of them was the Palace of the Son of Heaven (天子殿), also called Tianzi Hall. Fengdu later became known as the "Ghost City".

== See also ==
- Dongyue Dadi
- Kṣitigarbha
- Yanluo Wang
- Diyu (Chinese concept of Hell)
- Fengdu Ghost City
- Chinese folk religion
