= Tubo (mythology) =

Ancient lord of Chinese underworld

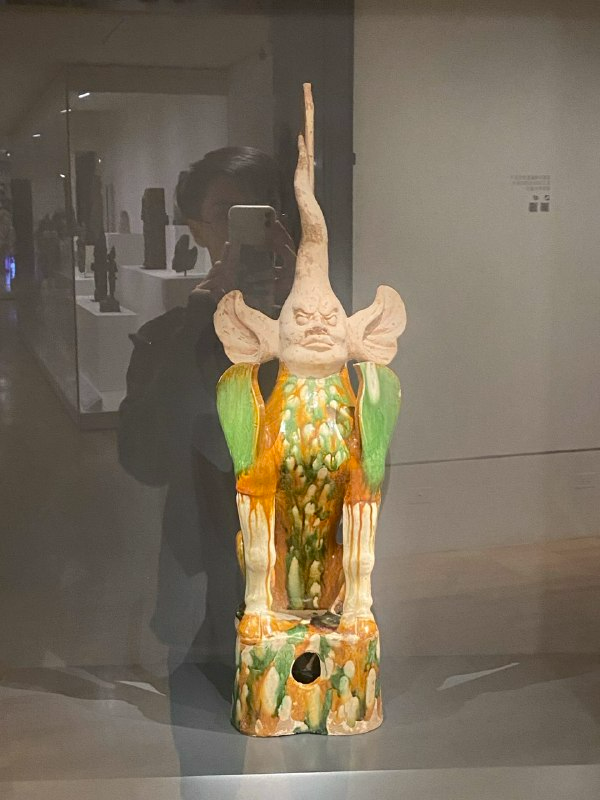
- A tubo-shaped guardian spiriti statue found in National Gallery of Victoria

Tubo (Chinese: 土伯; pinyin: tǔbó) is the warden of Youdu, the capital of Hell in Chinese mythology. He is a vassal under Houtu, but some scholars also suggest that he was the primordial overlord of the Diyu.

== Body ==
According to Chu Ci Zhao Hun, Tubo has a tiger head, a cow body, three bulging eyes, a pair of sharp horns, a pair of blood-stained hands that banishes the poor ghost and regard people as delicious food.

== Regional differences ==
=== Sichuan ===
In Sichuan mythology, Tubo is the first Emperor of Ghost. In ancient times Sichuan Basin was resided by two different ethnic groups, Ba people and Shu people. With the continuous exchanges in terms of religion, culture and ideologies, some common beliefs and identities were formed and shared. And Tubo is one of such common gods worshiped by both ethnic groups, as the first Emperor of Ghost. Some historians argue that Tubo was a tribe leader of the Ba people, because in Eastern Zhou dynasty, Youdu where Tubo lives was the capital of Ba (state), while some tribes of the Ba people were called the Ghost clan.

=== Hubei and Hunan ===
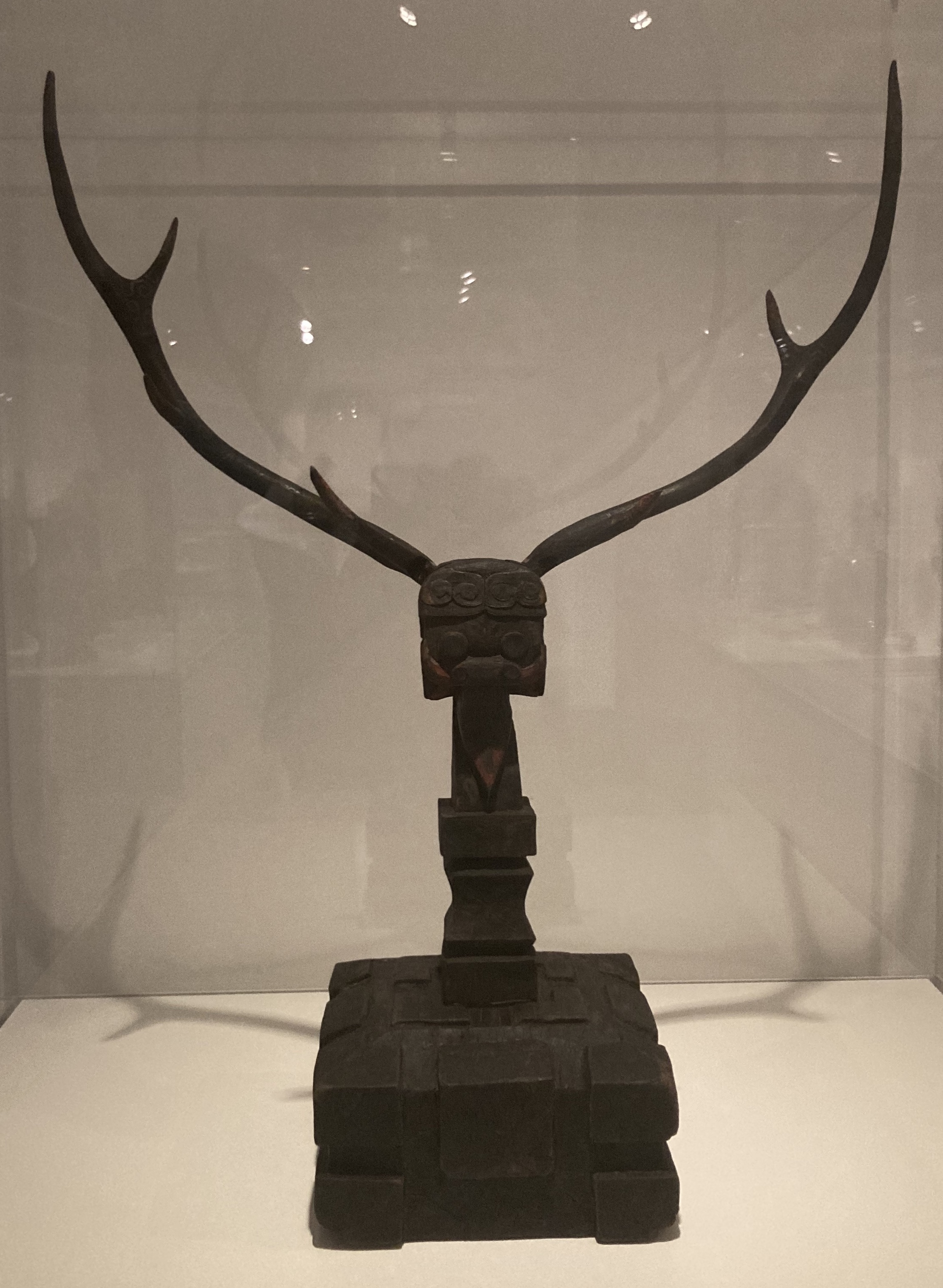
Tubo statue with long antlers found as grave guardians,Eastern Zhou(Brooklyn Museum)

In Eastern Zhou, people of Chu made sculptures of Tubo, and put them into graves, which are monster sculptures to soothe the soul of the deceased while protecting it from wandering ghost. The sculptures were usually made of wood and brass, and antlers were often used. Most such sculptures are found in Chu graves belong to scholar-bureaucrat class who followed Wu Shamanism. They usually believe that such grave guardian statues could bring their spirit to the Tian Jie and thus become immortal, at the same time ward off evil spirits from the tomb.

Although the faces of the existing monster sculptures are mostly obscure, other characteristics such as sharp horns, curved body, bulging eyes, ghostly expression, and close link to the underworld all bear remarkable similarity to descriptions of Tubo in historical texts.

== In popular culture ==
In the popular Chinese webfiction Mu Shen Ji, Tubo is the incarnation of the Tao of the underworld. The unbreakability of the Tubo Contract derives power from his horns.
