= Haw Par Villa =

Theme park in Singapore

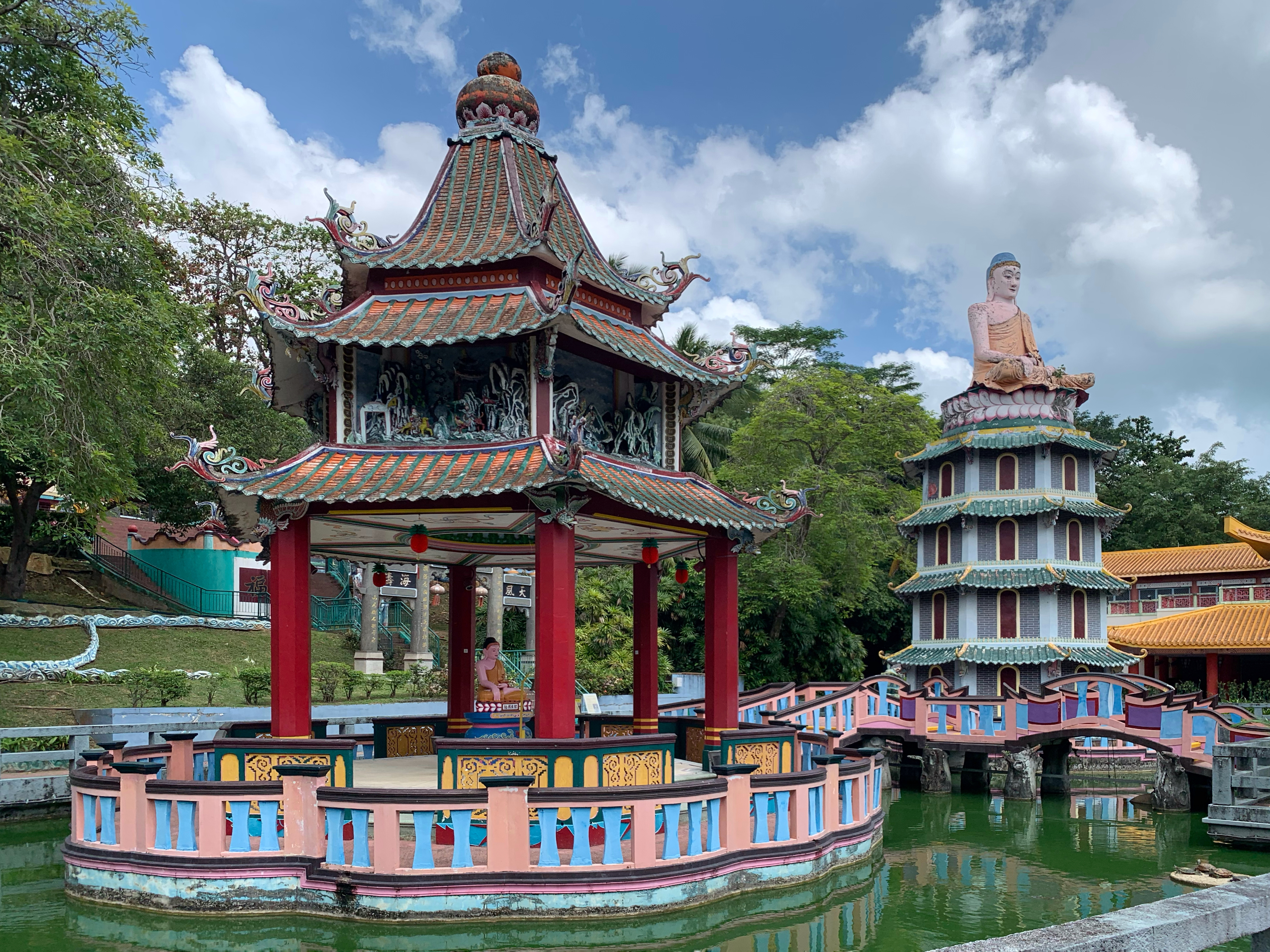
- A Buddhist pavilion and pagoda in the Haw Par Villa
- Interactive map of Haw Par Villa
- Location: 262 Pasir Panjang Road, Singapore 118628
- Coordinates: 01°17′03″N 103°46′56″E
- Public transit: CC25 Haw Par Villa
- Opened: 1937; 89 years ago
- Owner: Singapore Tourism Board
- Theme: Chinese folklore
- Area: 8.5 ha (21 acres)
- Website: Official website

Haw Par Villa (Chinese: 虎豹別墅; pinyin: Hǔ Bào Biéshù; Pe̍h-ōe-jī: hó͘ pà pia̍t-sú), also known as the Tiger Balm Gardens, is a theme park located along Pasir Panjang Road, Queenstown, Singapore. The park contains over 1,000 statues and 150 giant dioramas depicting scenes from Chinese literature, folklore, legends, history, and statuary of key Chinese religions, Taoism, Buddhism and Confucianism.

During the 1970s and 1980s, the park was a major local attraction; it is estimated that the park then welcomed at least 1 million annual visitors, and is considered as part of Singapore's cultural heritage. In 2021, the park opened Hell’s Museum, the world’s first museum on death and the afterlife, on the grounds of the park, incorporating the popular Ten Courts of Hell diorama. As of 8 December 2025, much of the park is closed for maintenance and repair works while Hell’s Museum remains open.

== History ==
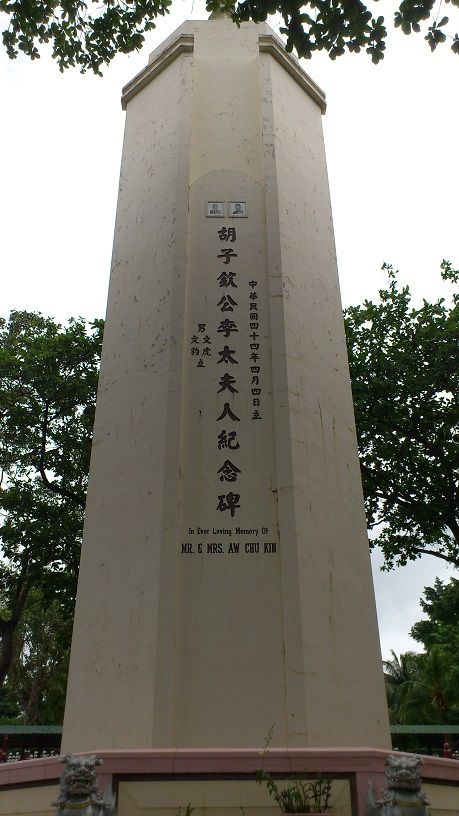
Memorial dedicated to the Aw brothers' parents

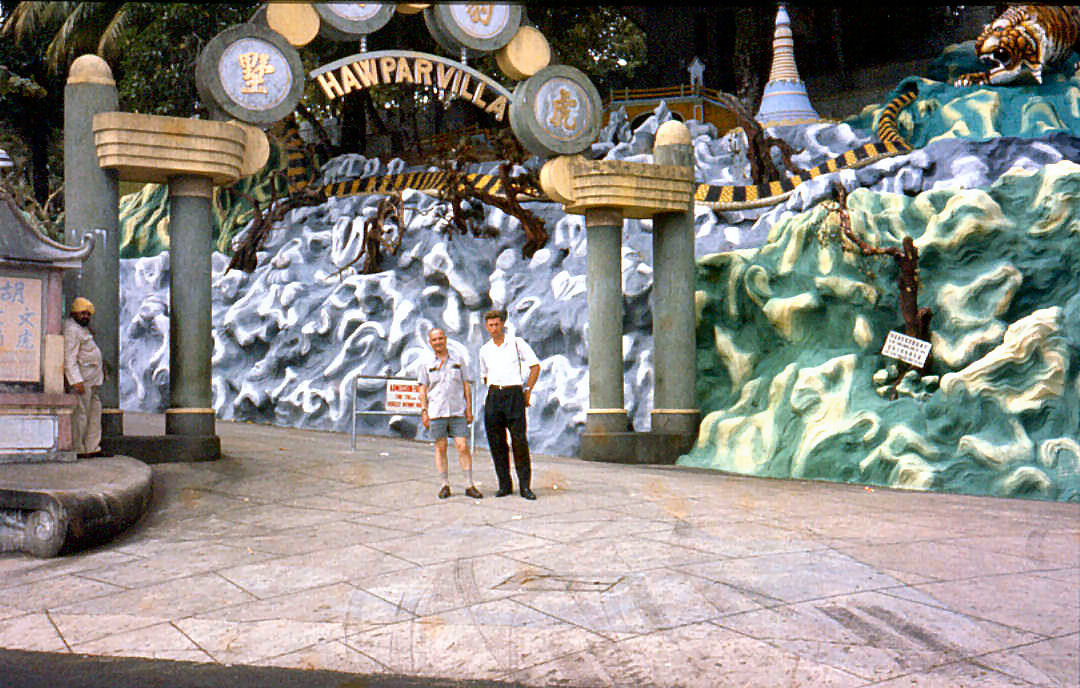
Entrance to Haw Par Villa in 1960

Burmese-Chinese brothers Aw Boon Haw and Aw Boon Par, the developers of Tiger Balm, moved their business from Burma to Singapore in 1926. The site, which is in front of a small hill and faces the Singapore Strait, was deemed suitable based on considerations of feng shui, and was purchased in 1935. On the site, a Haw Par Villa was being built for the next two years. The villa was designed by Ho Kwong Yew and was of Art Deco architecture. The villa was bombed by the Japanese during the World War II, and was subsequently occupied by them. After the war ended, the villa was demolished. Between 1937 and his death in 1954 (when the garden was declared public property, and turned into a park), Boon Haw commissioned statues and dioramas in the garden that served to teach traditional Chinese values.

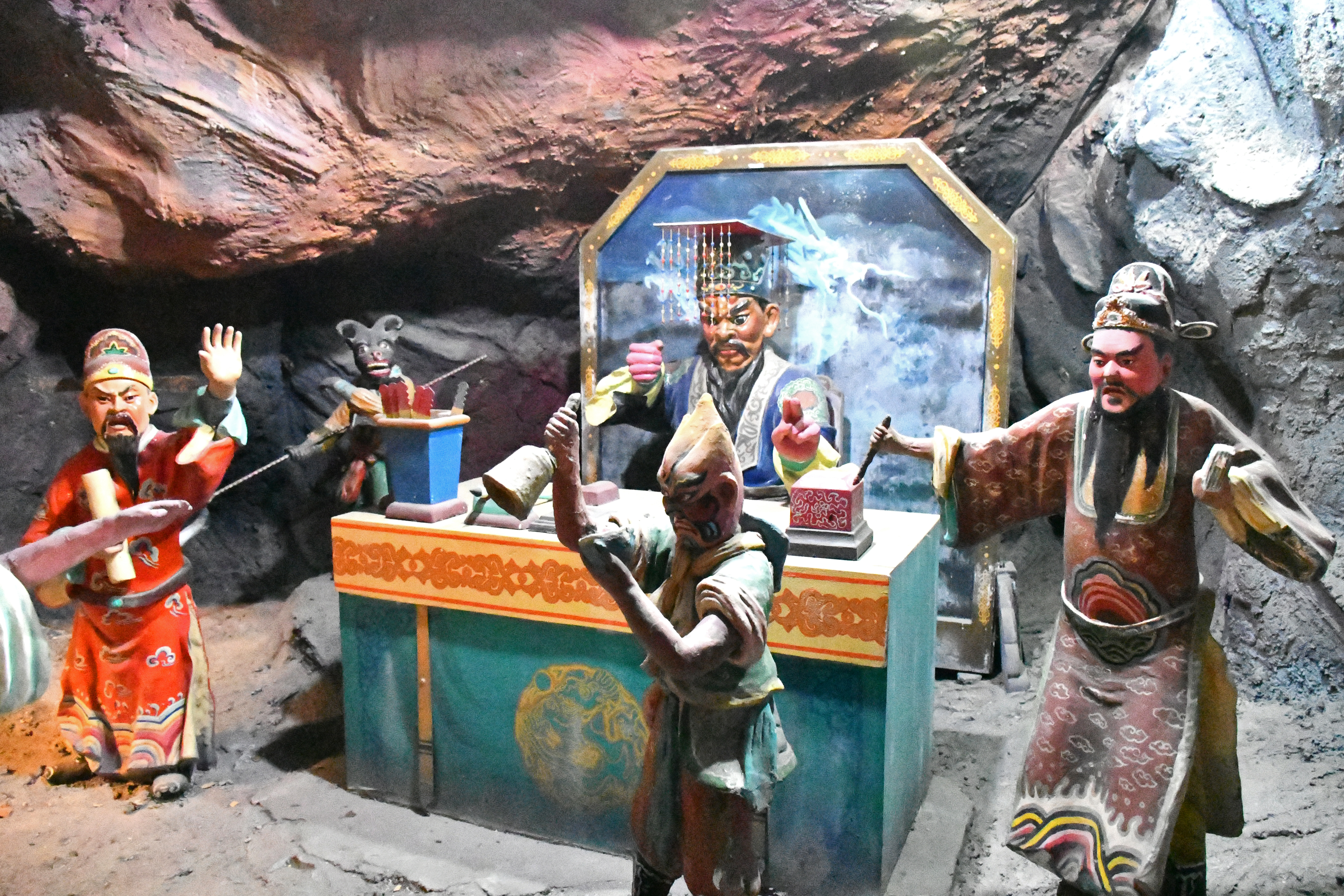
Interior of the Ten Courts of Hell

In the 1950s and 1960s, before the advent of television and shopping malls, the park was a popular recreational destination for Singaporean families. Many Singaporean adults, in a 1995 survey, reported memories of visiting the park as a child and learning about Chinese folk history and morality.

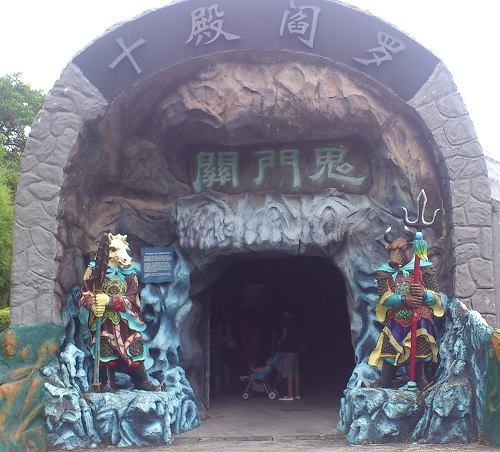
Entrance to the "Ten Courts of Hell" attraction at Haw Par Villa. The Ox-Headed (right) and Horse-Faced (left) Hell Guards stand guard at the entrance

In 1979, the park was handed over to the Singapore Tourist Promotion Board (STPB). In the 1980s, in a bid to restore Singapore's "oriental mystique", STPB saw to the redevelopment of the park (along with Chinatown and Little India). In 1986, the International Theme Parks Pte Ltd, announced an investment of $30 million to modernise the theme park. This company was a joint venture formed by Fraser & Neave and Times Publishing, and had invested in the latest animatronics and technology to enhance the attractions in the hope to create an 'oriental Disneyland', a theme park meeting Western technology with Eastern mythology.

In 1988, Singapore Tourism Board took charge of the Tiger Balm Gardens and renamed it "Haw Par Villa Dragon World". The Haw Par in the park's name is based on the Aw brothers' personal names—Haw and Par, which mean "tiger" and "leopard" respectively. The dioramas and statues were restored, while plays, acrobatic displays, and puppet shows were organised and held there. The management imposed entrance fees but the high fees discouraged visitors, so the management incurred a loss of S$31.5 million over 10 years. The park management made a profit during its first year of operations after renovations in 1994, broke even in 1995, but started incurring losses over the next three years and was forced to provide free entries in 1998.

In March 2001, International Theme Parks decided to sell back the park back to Singapore Tourism Board (STB), formerly STPB. STB took back the park and renamed it "Tiger Balm Gardens".

Between March 2006 and March 2012, the S$7.8 million Hua Song Museum, which focused on the Chinese diaspora, operated within the park.

In 2014, artists Chun Kai Qun, Chun Kaifeng and Elizabeth Gan, under the curatorial platform Latent Spaces, staged four exhibitions in the theme park's unused spaces. Their first exhibition, Nameless Forms, featured the works by the Chun twins, Darren Tesar, Sai Hua Kuan and collective Yunrubin, which respond to the place's defunct exhibition halls, idle pavilions and the materials that were left behind.

In 2015, heritage tour travels company Journeys Pte Ltd was appointed by STB to manage the park on a ten year contract.

In 2017, Journeys gave a sneak preview of a museum dedicated to death and the afterlife, named Hell's Museum, within the park. The concept drew mixed reactions from the public. Hell's Museum was to be opened in June 2018.

Haw Par Villa was closed for renovations in October 2020. It was originally scheduled to reopen on 31 March 2021, but was delayed due to the park operator, Journeys, needing more time to "further enhance its offerings". Haw Par Villa eventually reopened on 1 July 2021 after extension restoration works.

On 28 October 2021, after four years of research and development, Journeys officially launched Hell's Museum. The museum has since become one of Singapore's top-rated museums on TripAdvisor.

Throughout Journeys' tenure as park operator, it has rebranded the park to attract the younger generation, while maintaining emphasis on the park’s heritage and philosophies. The park hosted major music events such as Noise Invasion, Haw Par Thrilla, and Ice Cream Sundays, and its Asian and heritage-themed Halloween events, Haw Ror Villa, achieved sell-out status in 2024 and 2025. From a low of 7,000 visitors a month in 2015, Haw Par Villa enjoyed visitor figures of 35,000 to 40,000 in 2025.

In November 2025, STB announced that the park would be partially closed from 8 December for maintenance and repair works while Hell’s Museum remains open. Journey's contract with STB ended on 7 December.

== Attractions ==
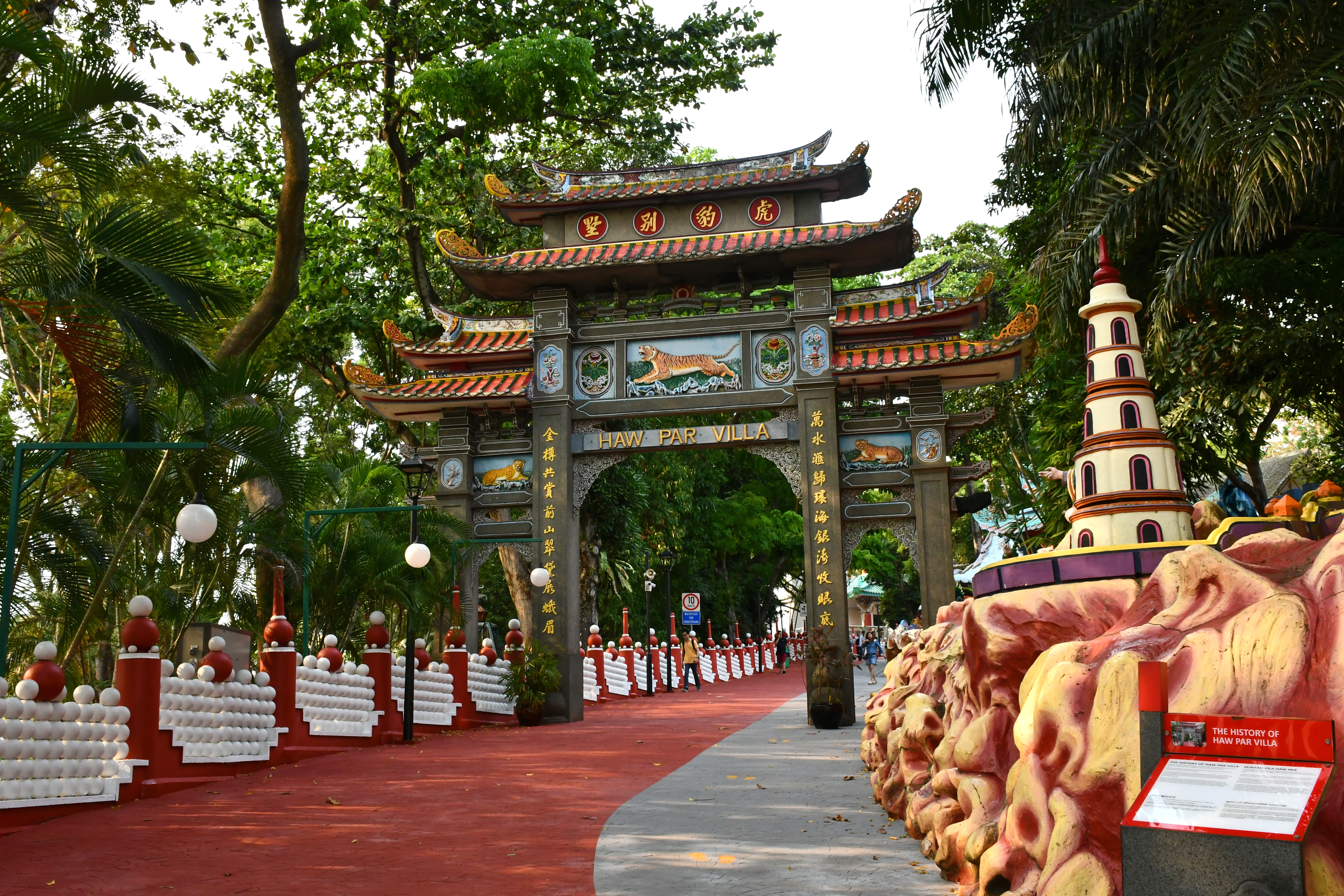
Chinese-style Paifang after main entrance

The best-known attraction in Haw Par Villa is the Ten Courts of Hell, which features gruesome depictions of Hell in Chinese mythology and in Buddhism. This attraction used to be set inside a 60-metre-long trail of a Chinese dragon but the dragon has been demolished, so the attraction is now covered by grey stone walls. After closure for renovations in 2020, the attraction was upgraded to be fully air-conditioned and the centerpiece of a 3,800 sqm Hell's Museum complex. While the park reopened in July 2021, the attraction reopened on 28 October.

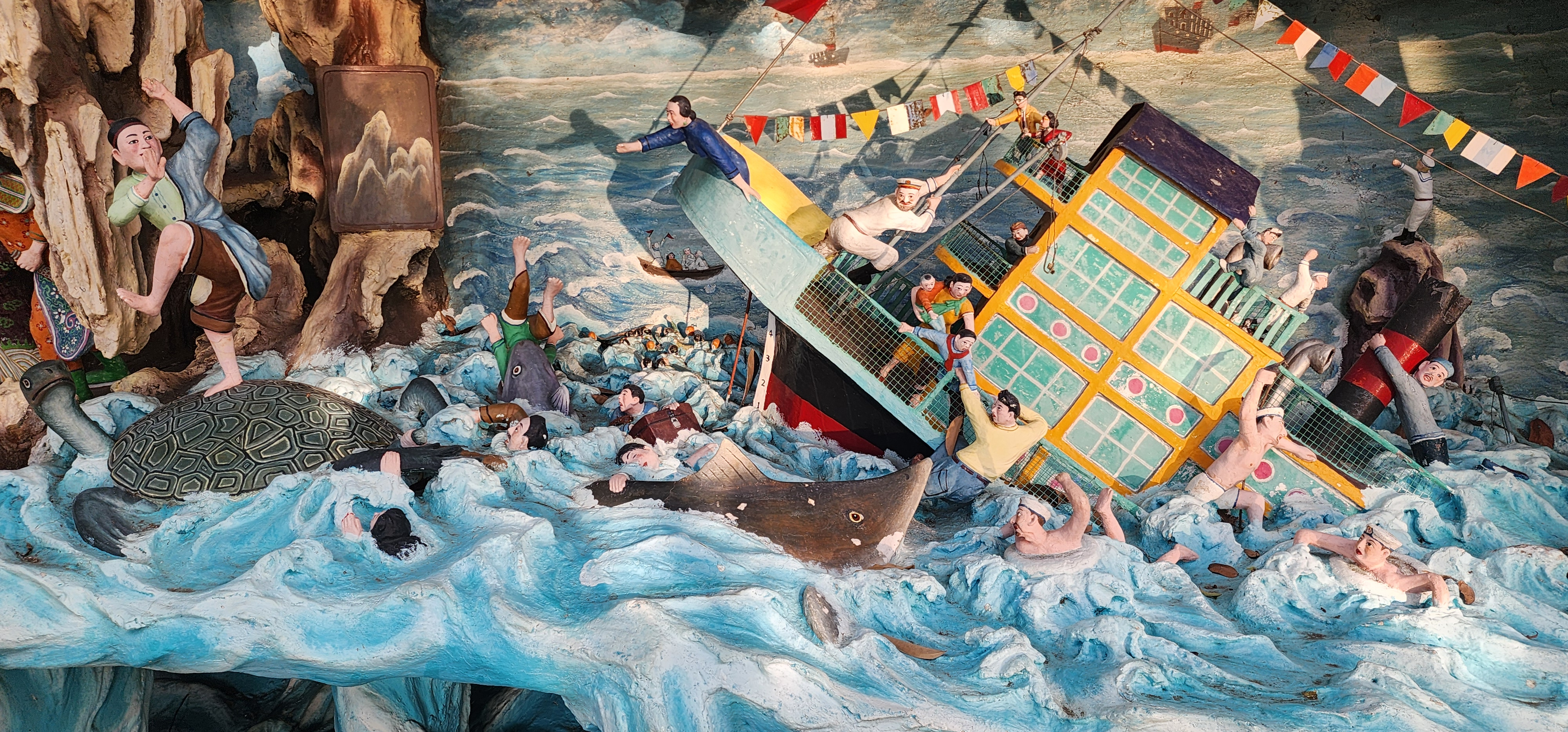
The tale of the grateful tortoise

Other major attractions include dioramas of scenes from Journey to the West, Fengshen Bang, The Twenty-four Filial Exemplars, Legend of the White Snake, Romance of the Three Kingdoms; statues of mythological figures such as the Laughing Buddha and Guanyin, and historical personages such as Jiang Ziya, Su Wu and Lin Zexu; the 12 animals in the Chinese zodiac, and others. There are also monuments dedicated to the Aw brothers and their parents.

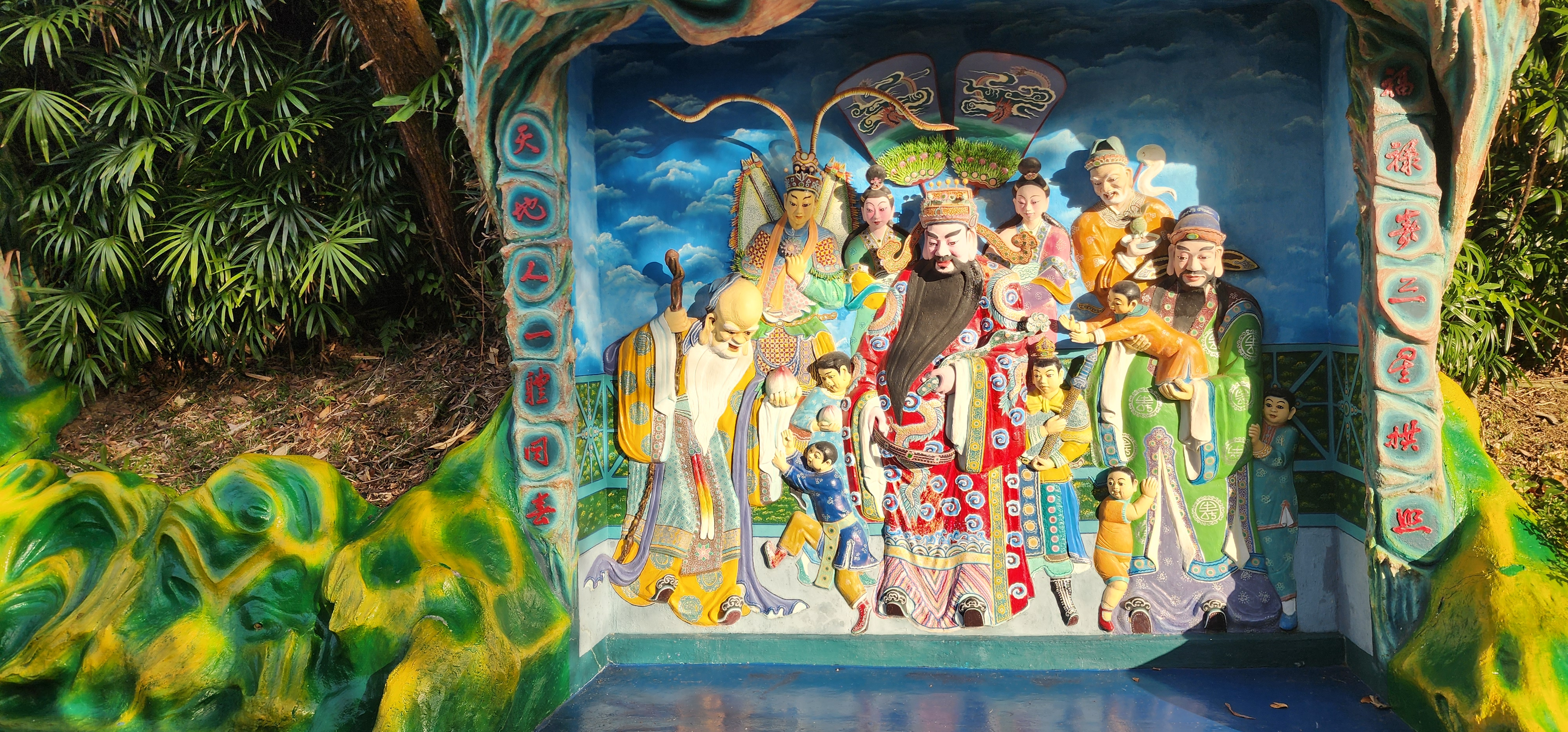
The Chinese gods of blessings, prosperity, and longevity, collectively known as Fu Lu Shou

In October 2021, the management of Haw Par Villa, Journeys Pte Ltd, launched Hell's Museum - a museum focused on death and the afterlife. Hell's Museum combines education and entertainment. It covers perspectives and insights on death and the afterlife across various religions, cultures, and civilisations – the result of humanity's quest over 300,000 years to seek answers to the big questions in life, questions such as “Where did we come from?” “What happens to us when we die?” and “What is the purpose of our existence?” In August 2023, Hell's Museum and Haw Par Villa was awarded Tripadvisor's Travellers’ Choice Winner. The award is only awarded to the top 10% of Tripadvisor's attractions worldwide.

An amphitheatre can be found further inside the park.

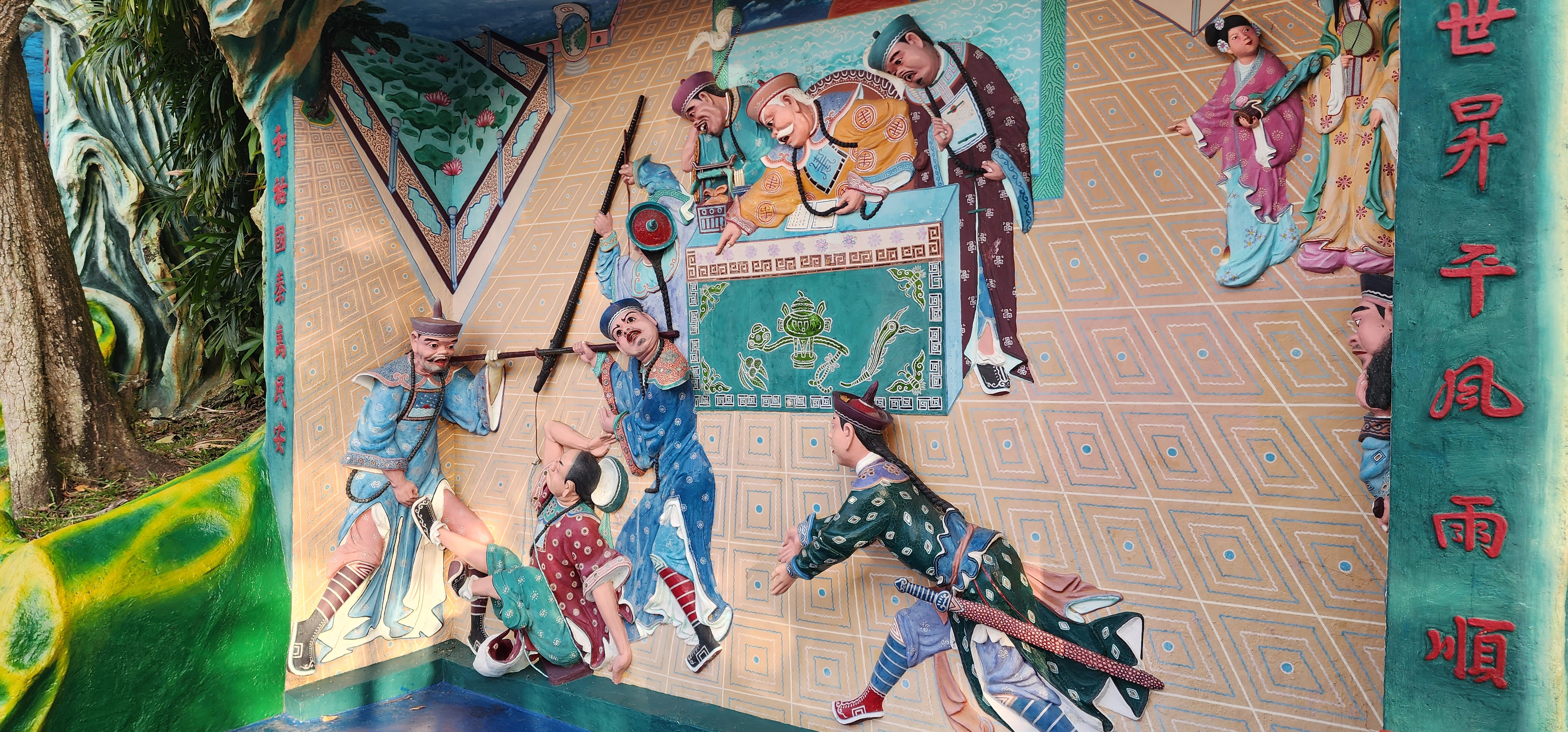
The legend of Kang Xi

Cafés at the Tiger Balm Gardens include The Sixth Milestone Cafe, located beside the turtle pond and Art Journey, a now-closed gelato cafe. There is also a chinese restaurant located on the west side of the complex, as well as the Asian Civilisation Museum which will open in 2025.

The east section of the park has been closed for some time. These include a larger amphitheatre, a building, a small park, and an elevated prayer pavilion.

== Contemporary reception and outlook ==
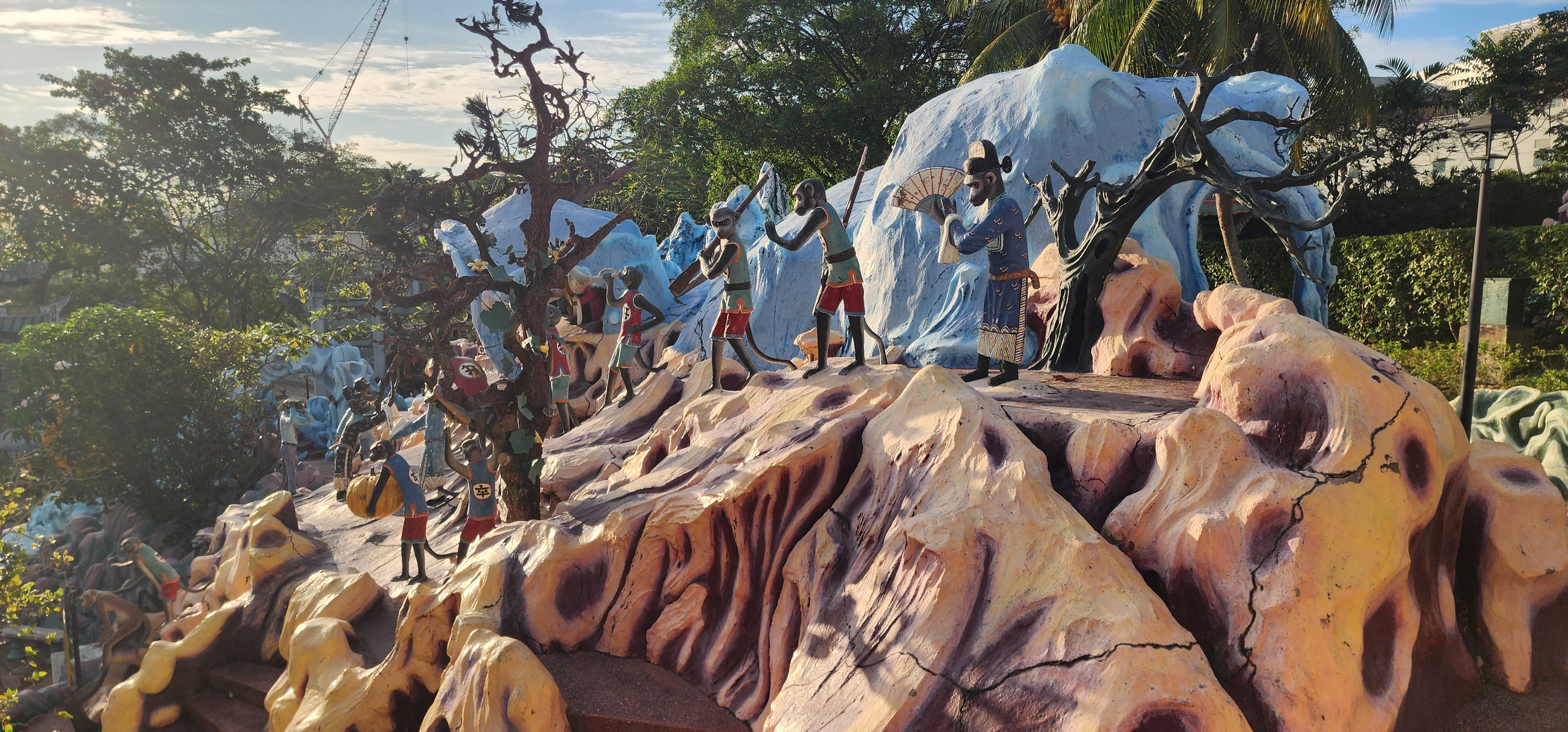
Home for the Monkey King, Hua Guo Shan

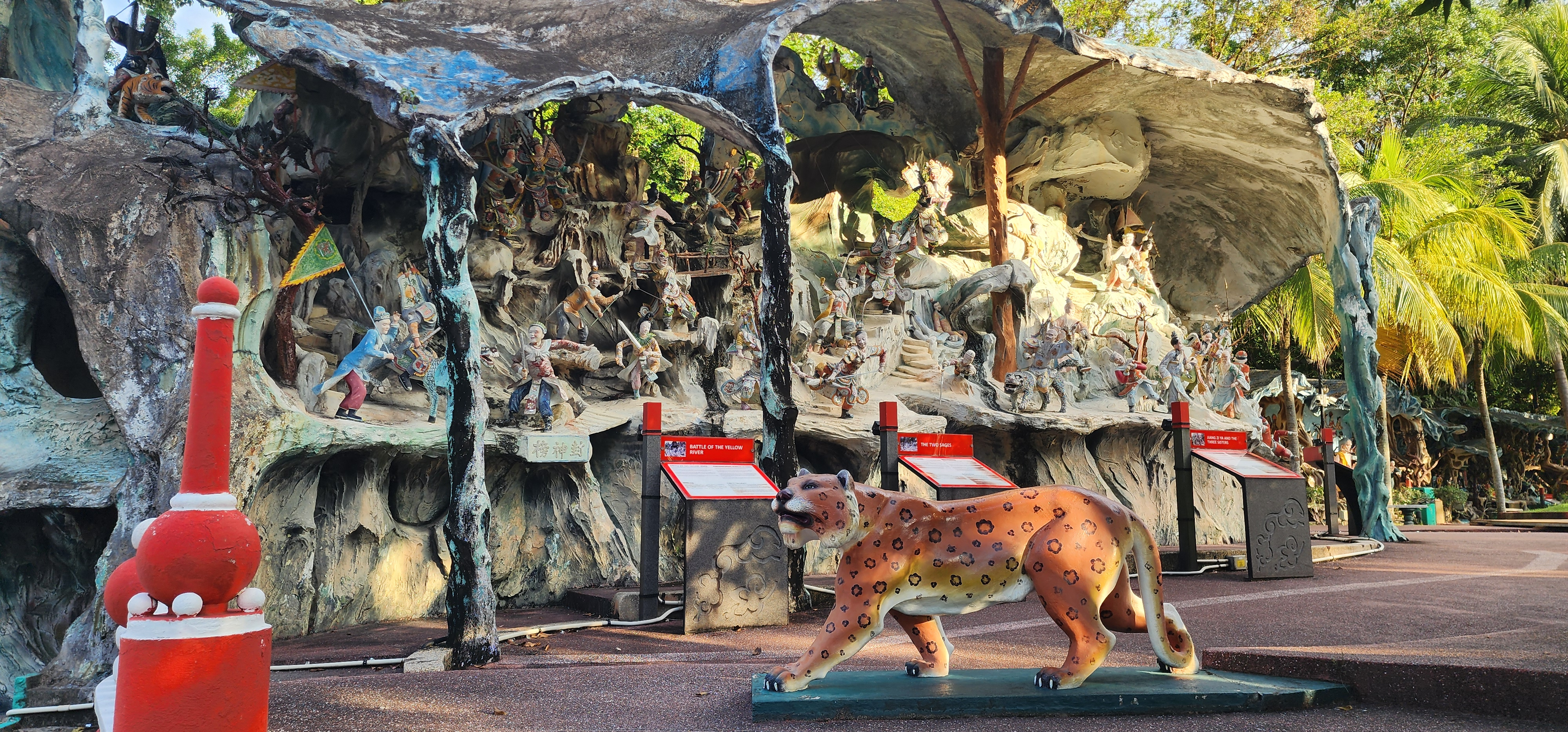
The Battle of the Yellow River and, to the right, the Tale of the Two Sages

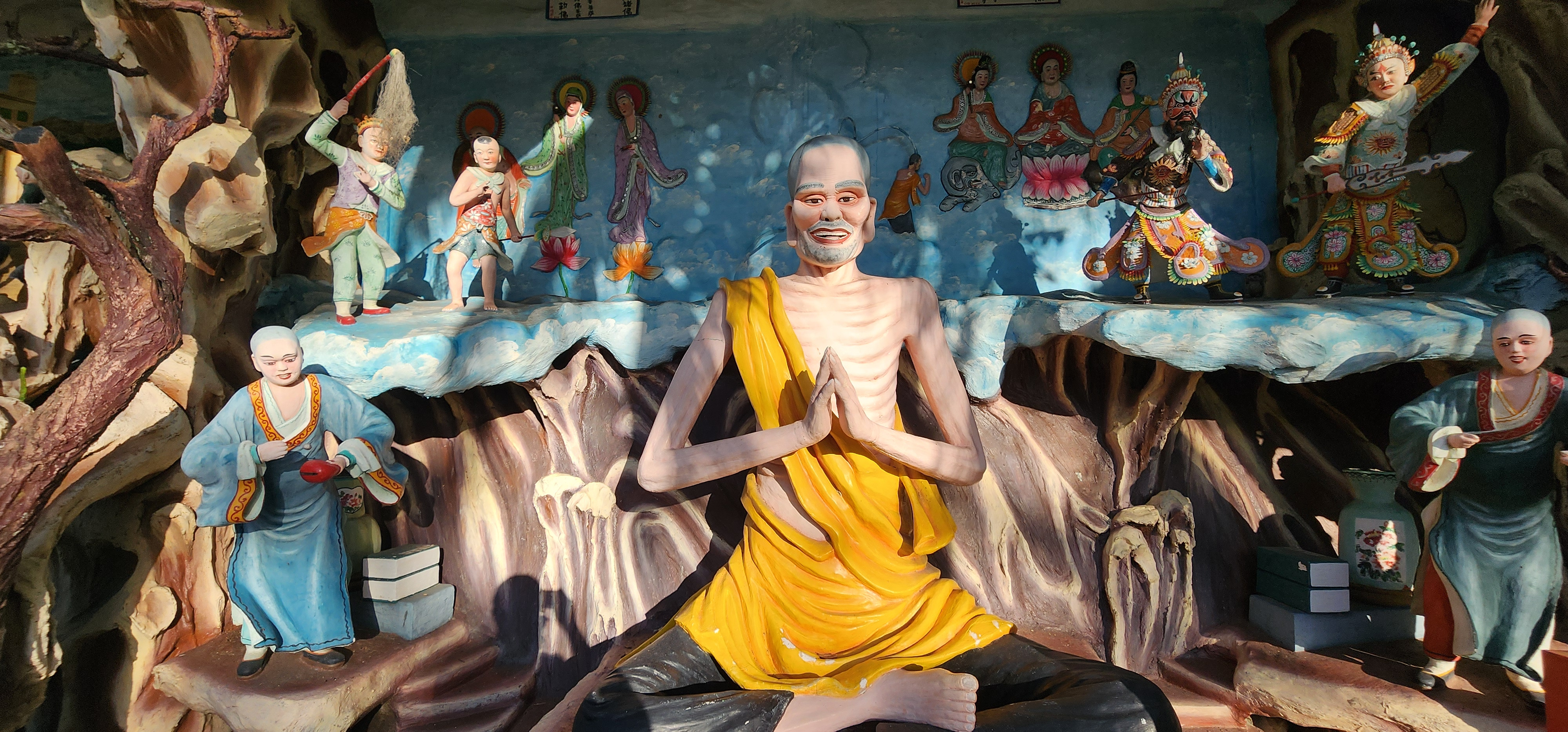
Buddha Da Dian Fo, better known as Ji Gong, from the Tang dynasty

In a 2014 study which reviewed 25 tourist guidebooks on Singapore, it was found that only the authors of one book chose to cover the park in detail. The study noted low tourist interest on the Internet, and low tourist foot traffic at the park. The study's authors also corroborated online travel reviews that some of the statues were in disrepair, and the park is ill-posed to compete with Singapore's newer tourist attractions. Haw Par Villa is, the authors note, "a treasured past, although one in danger of fading away with newer generations of tourists".

== Public transportation ==
Haw Par Villa is directly accessible by a Mass Rapid Transit (MRT) station of its namesake on the Circle Line located next to it.

== See also ==
- Tiger Balm Garden (Hong Kong)
- Sakya Muni Buddha Gaya Temple
