= List of cultural properties of Japan – historical materials (Kyoto) =

This list is of the cultural properties of Japan designated in the category of historical materials (歴史資料, rekishi shiryō) for the Urban Prefecture of Kyoto.

== National Cultural Properties ==
As of 1 December 2014, twenty Important Cultural Properties have been designated, being of national significance.

Property	Date	Municipality	Ownership	Comments	Image	Coordinates	Ref.
Architectural Drawings of Josiah Conder ジョサイア・コンドル建築図面; Josaia Kondoru kenchiku zumen	Meiji to Taishō period	Kyoto	Kyoto University	468 items		35°01′39″N 135°46′46″E	
No. 123 Locomotive 一二三号機関車<／一八七三年、英国製> hyaku-nijū-san-gō kikansha	1873	Yosano	Kaya Kosan Company Ltd (kept at Kaya Steam Locomotive Square (加悦SL広場)	made in England		35°28′51″N 135°05′34″E	
Port Dues Banner and Documents of the Hata Family 過所船旗〈文永九年二月日／（麻布）〉 秦家文書; Kasho senki Hata-ke monsho	Kamakura to Edo period	Kyoto	Kyoto University (kept at The Kyoto University Museum (京都大学総合博物館))	109 items		35°01′38″N 135°46′45″E	
Materials relating to Iwakura Tomomi 岩倉具視関係資料; Iwakura Tomomi kankei shiryō	C19	Kyoto	Kyoto City History Museum	1,018 items		35°04′42″N 135°46′59″E	
Administrative Documents of Kyoto Prefecture 京都府行政文書; Kyōto-fu gyōsei bunsho	Edo to Shōwa period	Kyoto	Kyoto Prefectural Library and Archives (京都府立総合資料館)	15,407 items		35°03′03″N 135°45′58″E	
Materials relating to Sakamoto Ryōma 坂本龍馬関係資料; Sakamoto Ryōma kankei shiryō	C19	Kyoto	Kyoto National Museum	10 items		34°59′24″N 135°46′25″E	
Sangaku 算額〈元禄四年五月二十四日長谷川鄰完奉納／〉 sangaku	1691	Kyoto	Yasaka Jinja			35°00′13″N 135°46′43″E	
Shinju-an Masu 真珠庵枡; Shinjuan masu	Muromachi period	Kyoto	Shinju-an (真珠庵)	2 items		35°02′40″N 135°44′47″E	
Joseon Diplomatic Documents 朝鮮国書; Chōsen tsūshinshi kankei shiryō	1607-17	Kyoto	Kyoto University (kept at The Kyoto University Museum (京都大学総合博物館))	3 items		35°01′39″N 135°46′45″E	
Materials relating to the Joseon Missions 朝鮮通信使関係資料; Chōsen tsūshinshi kankei shiryō	Edo period	Kyoto	Yūrinkan Museum (藤井斉成会有鄰館)	9 items		35°00′42″N 135°46′53″E	
Tetsugen Edition Sutra Woodblocks 鉄眼版一切経版木; Tetusgen-ban issaikyō hangi	Edo period	Uji	Hōzō-in (宝蔵院)	48,275 items		34°54′55″N 135°48′16″E	
Nanzen-ji Temple Instructions 南禅寺仏殿指図（三図） Nanzenji sashizu	Muromachi period	Kyoto	Nanzen-ji			35°00′40″N 135°47′38″E	
Map of Japan 日本図; Nihon-zu	1305	Kyoto	Ninna-ji			35°01′52″N 135°42′50″E	
Materials relating to the Yase Dōji 八瀬童子関係資料; Yase Dōji kankei shiryō	Muromachi period onwards	Kyoto	Kyoto City History Museum	741 items		35°01′09″N 135°46′04″E	
Ceremonial Fans of the Mibu Family 桧扇（壬生家伝来） Hiōgi (Mibu-ke denrai)	Kamakura to Muromachi period	Kyoto	Kyoto University (kept at The Kyoto University Museum (京都大学総合博物館))	two fans		35°01′38″N 135°46′45″E	
Fukō-in Temple Instructions 普広院指図; Fukō-in sashizu	Muromachi period	Kyoto	Shōkoku-ji			35°01′59″N 135°45′44″E	
Buke Shohatto Drafts 武家諸法度草稿〈以心崇伝筆／元和二年十月日〉 Buke shohatto sōkō	1616	Kyoto	Konchi-in (金地院)	one scroll in the hand of Ishin Sūden		35°00′37″N 135°47′26″E	
Fushimi-ban Woodcut Characters 伏見版木活字; Fushimi-ban moku-katsuji	Edo period	Kyoto	Enkō-ji	52,320 items		35°02′42″N 135°47′49″E	
Materials relating to the Fukui Family Kyoto Masu Guild 福井家京枡座関係資料; Fukui-ke Kyō-masuza kankei shiryō	Edo period	Kyoto		2,139 items			

== Prefectural Cultural Properties ==
As of 1 December 2014, thirteen properties have been designated at a prefectural level.

Property	Date	Municipality	Ownership	Comments	Image	Coordinates	Ref.
Materials relating to the Kyōto Institution for the Blind 京都盲啞院関係資料; Kyōto mōai-in kankei shiryō	Edo to Taishō period	Kyoto	Kyoto Prefecture	732 items		35°01′16″N 135°45′20″E	
Materials relating to the Minagawa Family Tenmon Rekidō 皆川家天文暦道関係資料; Minagawa-ke Tenmon Rekidō kankei shiryō	Muromachi to Meiji period	Kyoto	Daishōgunhachi Jinja	498 items		35°01′36″N 135°44′02″E	
Materials relating to Taichū Shōnin 袋中上人関係資料; Taichū Shōnin kankei shiryō	Momoyama to Edo period	Kyoto	Dannōhōrin-ji			35°00′36″N 135°46′24″E	
Chinkō-ji Sankei Mandala 珍皇寺参詣曼荼羅; Chinkōji sankei mandara	Momoyama period	Kyoto	Rokudō Chinkō-ji	sankei mandala (参詣曼荼羅) depict the sacred sites of shrines and temples, populated with pilgrims and related historical and legendary events, and were often used in explanatory story-telling or e-toki		34°59′54″N 135°46′31″E	
Kiyomizu-dera Sankei Mandala 清水寺参詣曼荼羅; Kiyomizudera sankei mandara	Muromachi period	Kyoto	Kiyomizu-dera			34°59′41″N 135°47′06″E	
Hōrin-ji Sankei Mandala 法輪寺参詣曼荼羅; Hōrinji sankei mandara	Momoyama period	Kyoto	Hōrin-ji			35°00′37″N 135°40′37″E	
Yoshimine-dera - Sankō-ji Sankei Mandala 善峰寺参詣曼荼羅・三鈷寺参詣曼荼羅; Yoshimine-dera・Sankōji sankei mandara	Muromachi period	Kyoto	Yoshimine-dera			34°56′16″N 135°38′39″E	
Hikioi Mandala Woodblocks 曳覆曼荼羅版木; Hikioi mandala hangi	1375	Kizugawa	Saimyō-ji (西明寺)	2 items		34°45′03″N 135°51′23″E	
Materials relating to Tokuhō Zenketsu 特芳禅傑関係資料; Tokuhō Zenketsu kankei shiryō	Muromachi to Edo period	Kameoka	Ryōan-ji (龍潭寺)	21 items		35°01′37″N 135°32′30″E	
Historical Materials relating to Isshi Bunshu at Hōjōji 法常寺一絲文守他歴代関係資料; Hōjōji Isshi Bunshu hoka rekidai kankei shiryō	Edo period	Kameoka	Hōjō-ji (法常寺)	337 items		35°00′54″N 135°26′39″E	
Nariai-ji Sankei Mandala 成相寺参詣曼荼羅; Nariaiji sankei mandara	Muromachi period	Miyazu	Nariai-ji			35°35′44″N 135°11′15″E	
Materials relating to Genpō Reizan 玄圃霊三関係資料; Genpō Reizan kankei shiryō	Momoyama to Edo period	Kyōtango	Sōun-ji (宗雲寺)	36 items		35°36′07″N 134°53′11″E	
Historical Records of the Kameyama Domain 亀山藩史料; Kameyama-han shiryō	Edo to Meiji period	Kameoka	Kameoka City Bunka Shiryōkan (亀岡市文化資料館)	198 items		35°00′49″N 135°35′08″E	

== Registered Cultural Properties ==
In addition, as of 1 December 2014 one property has been registered (as opposed to designated) nationally and another at the prefectural level:

Property	Date	Municipality	Ownership	Comments	Image	Coordinates	Ref.
Materials for Architectural Education 建築教育資料（京都帝国大学工学部建築学教室旧蔵） kenchiku kyōiku shiryō	Ancient to Modern	Kyoto	Kyoto University	2,653 items (national registration)		35°01′39″N 135°46′46″E	
Materials relating to Hatago Matsuya 旅籠松屋関係資料; Hatago Matsuya kankei shiryō	Edo to Meiji period	Kyoto	private	1,293 items (prefectural registration)			

== See also ==
- Cultural Properties of Japan
- List of National Treasures of Japan (historical materials)
- Kyoto National Museum
