= Yama (Buddhism) =

Buddhist, Taoist, Chinese, and general East Asian death deity

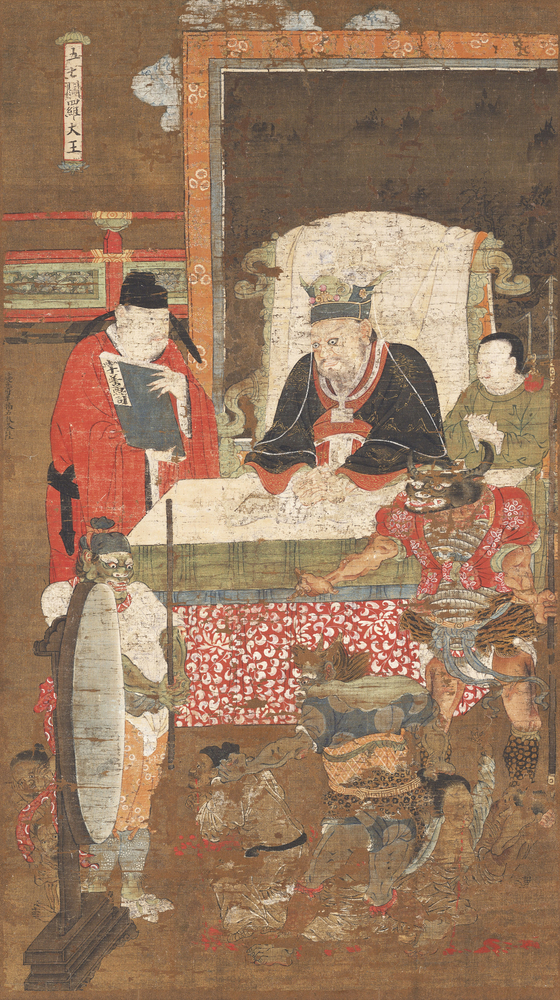
14th-century Chinese Yuan dynasty portrait of King Yama. One of a series of paintings of the "Ten Kings of Hell" by Lu Xinzhong

In East Asian and Buddhist mythology, Yama (Note: Chinese: 閻魔/閻摩; pinyin: Yánmó) is the King of Hell and a dharmapala (wrathful god) said to judge the dead, presiding over the hellish realms and over the cycle of life and rebirth. He goes by other names as well, including Yanluo Wang, (Note: Chinese: 閻羅王; pinyin: Yánluó Wáng) Yan Wang, (Note: Chinese: 閻王; pinyin: Yánwáng) Master Yan Wang, (Note: Chinese: 閻王爺; pinyin: Yánwángyé) Lord Yan, (Note: Chinese: 閻君; pinyin: Yánjūn) and Yanluo, Son of Heaven. (Note: Chinese: 閻羅天子; pinyin: Yánluó Tiānzǐ)

Although based on the god Yama of the Hindu Vedas, the Buddhist Yama has developed different myths and different functions from the Hindu deity. He has also spread far more widely and is known in most countries where Buddhism is practiced, including China, Nepal, Korea, Japan, Taiwan, Vietnam, Bhutan, Mongolia, Thailand, Sri Lanka, Cambodia, Myanmar and Laos.

== In Theravāda Buddhism ==
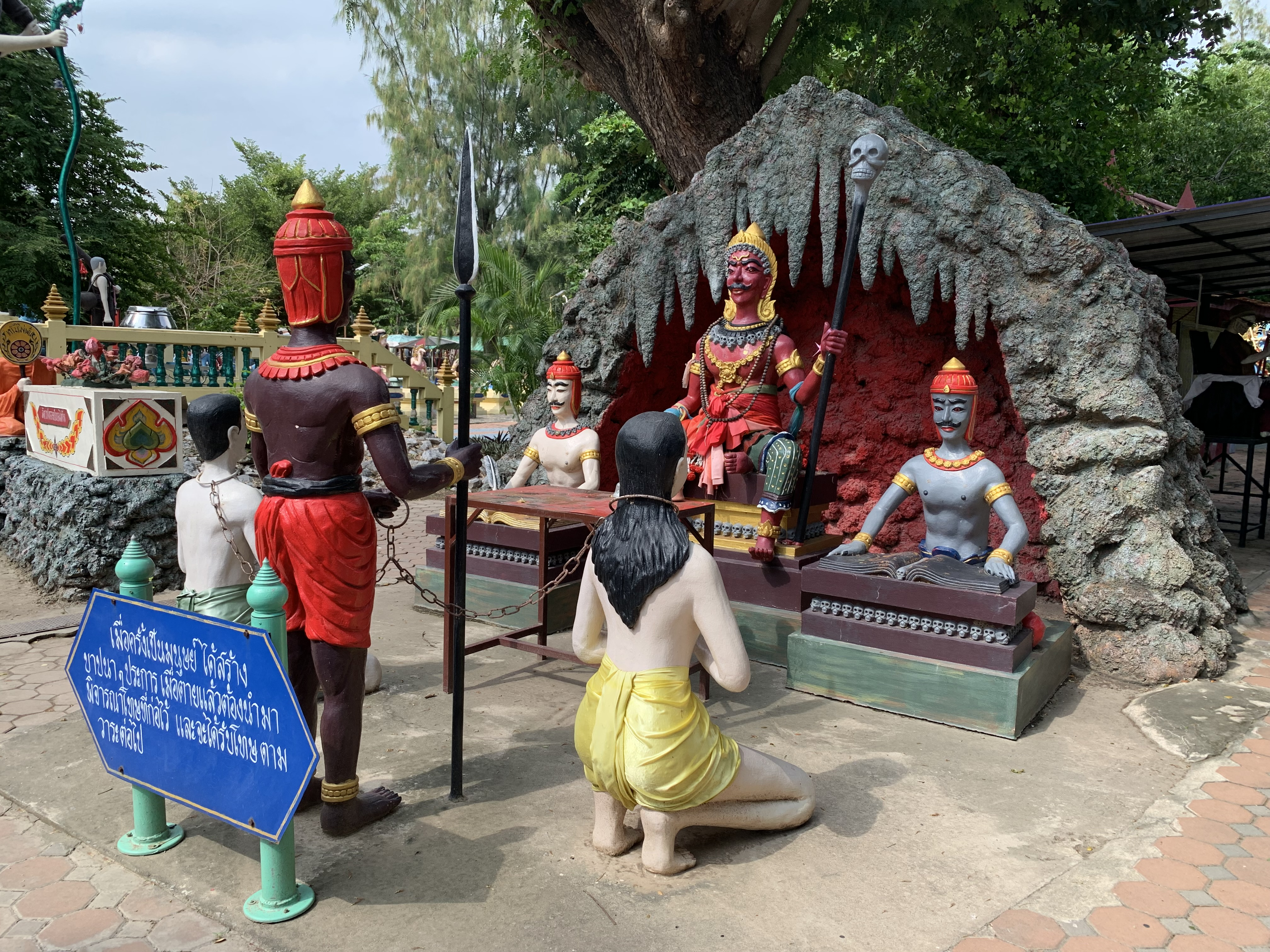
Yama (seated centre) in a judgement scene in Naraka, a depiction at Wat Muang, Thailand

In the Pali canon, the Buddha states that a person who has ill-treated their parents, ascetics, holy persons, or elders is taken upon his death to Yama. (Note: See, for example, MN 130 (Nanamoli & Bodhi 2001, pp. 1029–1036) and AN 3.35 (Thera & Bodhi 1999, pp. 51–53), both of which are entitled "Devaduta Sutta" (The Divine Messengers).) Yama then asks the ignoble person if he ever considered his own ill conduct in light of birth, deterioration, sickness, worldly retribution and death. In response to Yama's questions, such an ignoble person repeatedly answers that he failed to consider the karmic consequences of his reprehensible actions and as a result is sent to a brutal hell "so long as that evil action has not exhausted its result."

In the Pali commentarial tradition, the scholar Buddhaghosa's commentary to the Majjhima Nikaya describes Yama as a vimānapeta (विमानपेत), a "being in a mixed state", sometimes enjoying celestial comforts and at other times punished for the fruits of his karma. However, Buddhaghosa considered his rule as a king to be just.

Modern Theravādin countries portray Yama sending old age, disease, punishments, and other calamities among humans as warnings to behave well. At death, they are summoned before Yama, who examines their character and dispatches them to their appropriate rebirth, whether to earth or to one of the heavens or hells. Sometimes there are thought to be two or four Yamas, each presiding over a distinct Hell. (Note: According to (Nanamoli & Bodhi 2001, p. 1341 n. 1206) the Majjhima Nikaya Atthakatha states that "there are in fact four Yamas, one at each of four gates (of hell?)." The paranthetical expression is from the text.)

== In Chinese, Korean, Vietnamese, and Japanese mythology ==
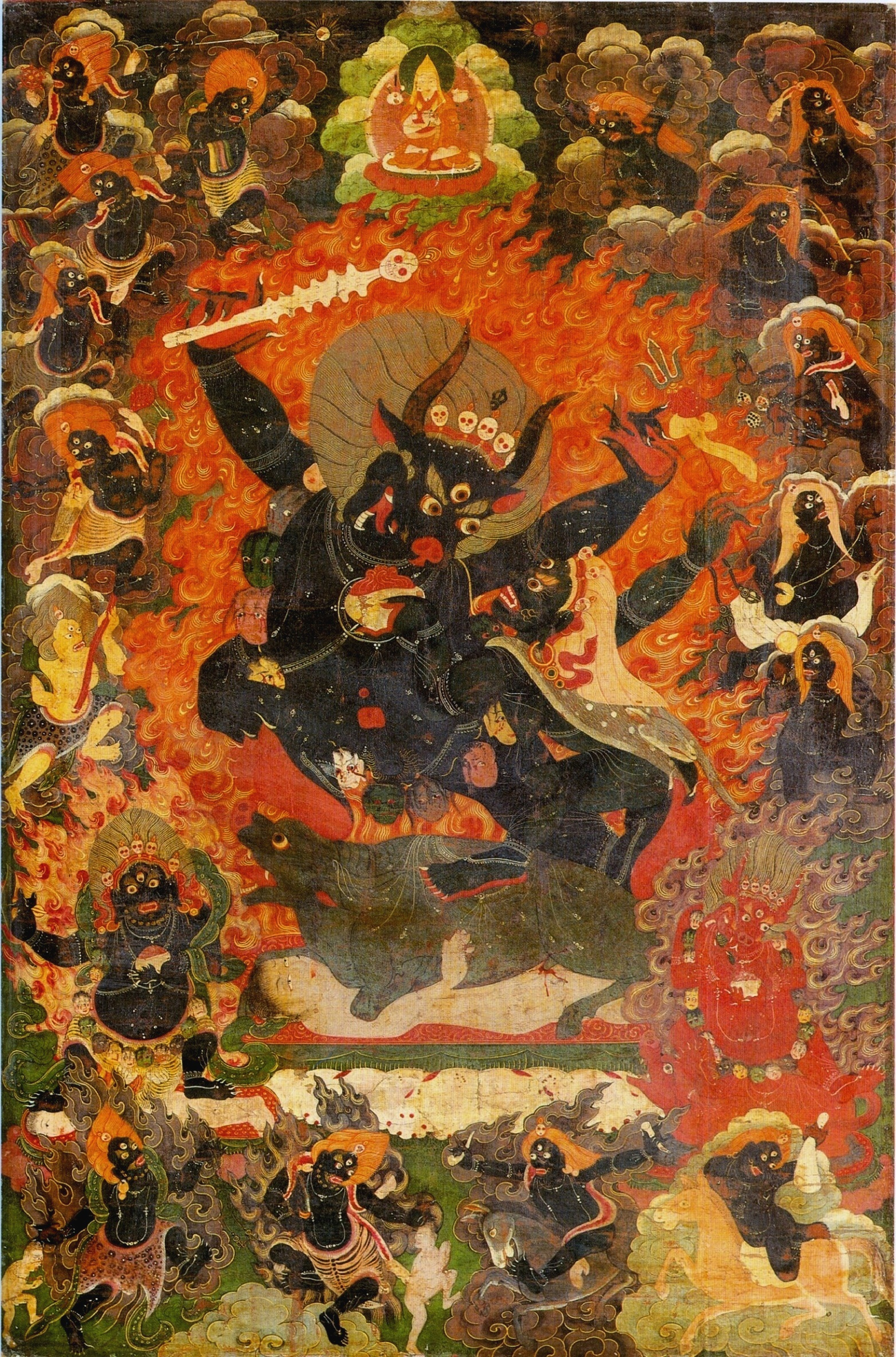
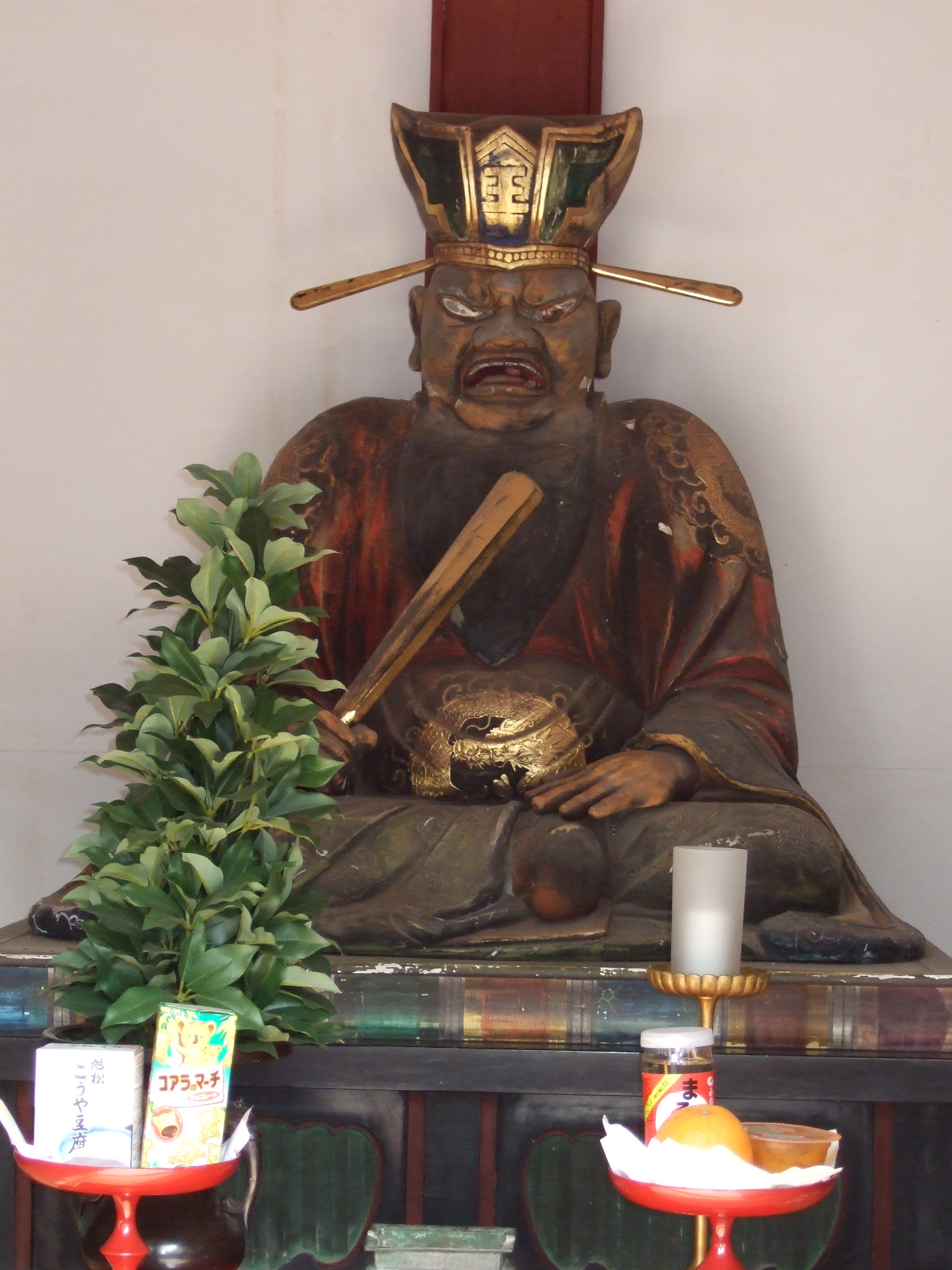
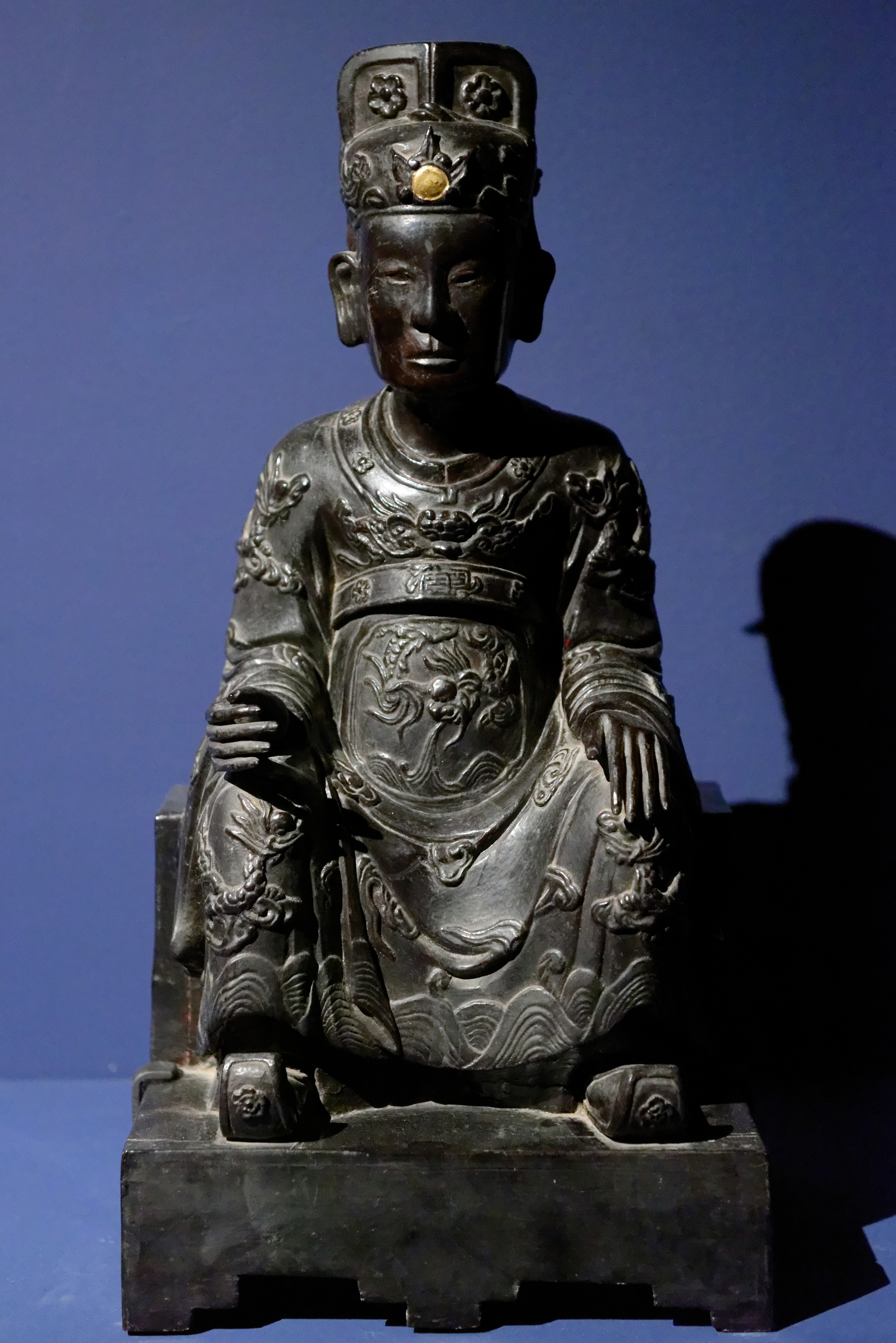
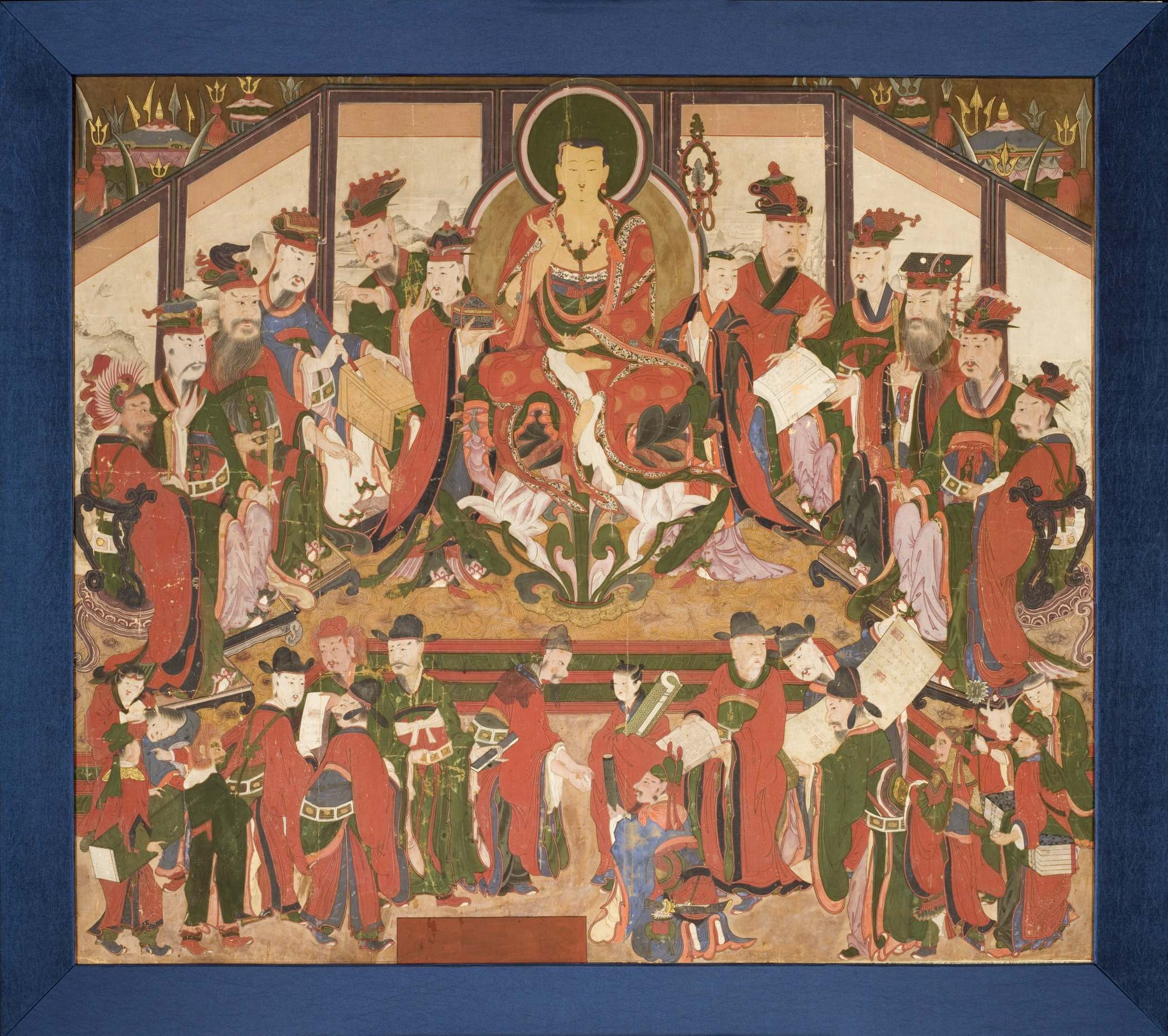
Clockwise from upper left: Yama, mid-17th century, Tibet; Statue of Yama (Enma) at Nariai-ji, Japan; Joseon dynasty painting of Bodhisattva Jijang (Kṣitigarbha) and the Ten Kings of Hell, Korea; Statue of one of the ten Yama (Diêm Vương) during the Lê - Nguyễn dynasties, Vietnam

"Yanluo Wang" was sometimes considered to be a position in the celestial hierarchy, rather than an individual. There were said to be cases in which an honest mortal was rewarded the post of Yanluo Wang and served as the judge and ruler of the underworld. Some said common people like Bao Zheng, Fan Zhongyan, Zhang Binglin became the Yanluo Wang at night or after death.

They were strongly challenged from the Tang dynasty by a new version influenced by Daoism, which adopted Yanluo Wang to make it the fifth of a set of ten kings (shidian Yánluó wáng 十殿阎罗王, Guardian king-sorter of the ten chambers) each named at the head of a hell by the Jade Emperor. The other nine kings are: Qinguangwang (秦广王), Chujiangwang (楚江王), Songdiwang (宋帝王), Wuguanwang (五官王), Bianchengwang (卞城王), Taishanwang (泰山王), Pingdengwang (平等王) Dushiwang (都市王) Zhuanlunwang (转轮王), typically Taoist names. They compete with Heidi, another Taoist god of the world of the dead. Yanluo Wang remains nevertheless the most famous, and by far the most present in the iconography.

However, then it disappears completely from the list, giving way to a historical figure, a magistrate appointed during his lifetime as judge of the dead by a superior deity. This magistrate is most often Bao Zheng, a famous judge who lived during the Song dynasty. Sometimes he is accompanied by three assistants named "Old Age", "Illness" and "Death".

Yanluo Wang is also regarded as one of the Twenty Devas (二十諸天 Èrshí Zhūtiān) or the Twenty-Four Devas (二十四諸天 Èrshísì zhūtiān), a group of protective Dharmapalas, in Chinese Buddhism.

Some of these Chinese beliefs subsequently spread to Korea, Japan and Vietnam. In Japan, he is called Enma (閻魔, prev. "Yenma"), King Enma (閻魔王, Enma-ō), and Great King Enma (閻魔大王, Enma Dai-Ō). In Korea, Yan is known as Yeom-ra (염라, 閻魔) and Great King Yeom-ra (염라대왕, 閻羅大王, Yŏm-ra Daewang). In Vietnam, these Buddhist deities are known as Diêm La Vương (閻羅王) or Diêm Vương (閻王), Minh Vương (冥王) and are venerated as a council of all ten kings who oversee underworld realm of âm phủ, and according to the Vietnamese concept, the ten kings of hell are all governed by Phong Đô Đại Đế (酆都大帝).

=== Variable identity ===
In the syncretic and non-dogmatic world of Chinese religious views, Yanluo Wang's interpretation can vary greatly from person to person. While some recognize him as a Buddhist deity, others regard him as a Taoist counterpart of Bodhisattva Kṣitigarbha. Generally seen as a stern deity, Yanluo Wang is also a righteous and fair Supreme Judge in underworld or skillful advocate of Dharma.

== In Tibetan Buddhism ==
In Tibetan Buddhism Yama occurs in the form of Yama Dharmaraja, also known as Kalarupa, Shinje or Shin Je Cho Gyal (Tibetan: གཤིན་རྗེ་, Gshin.rje). He is both regarded with horror as the prime mover of the cycle of death and rebirth and revered as a guardian of spiritual practice. In the popular mandala of the Bhavachakra, all of the realms of life are depicted between the jaws or in the arms of a monstrous Shinje. Shinje is sometimes shown with a consort, Chamundi, or a sister, Yami, and sometimes pursued by Yamantaka (conqueror of death).

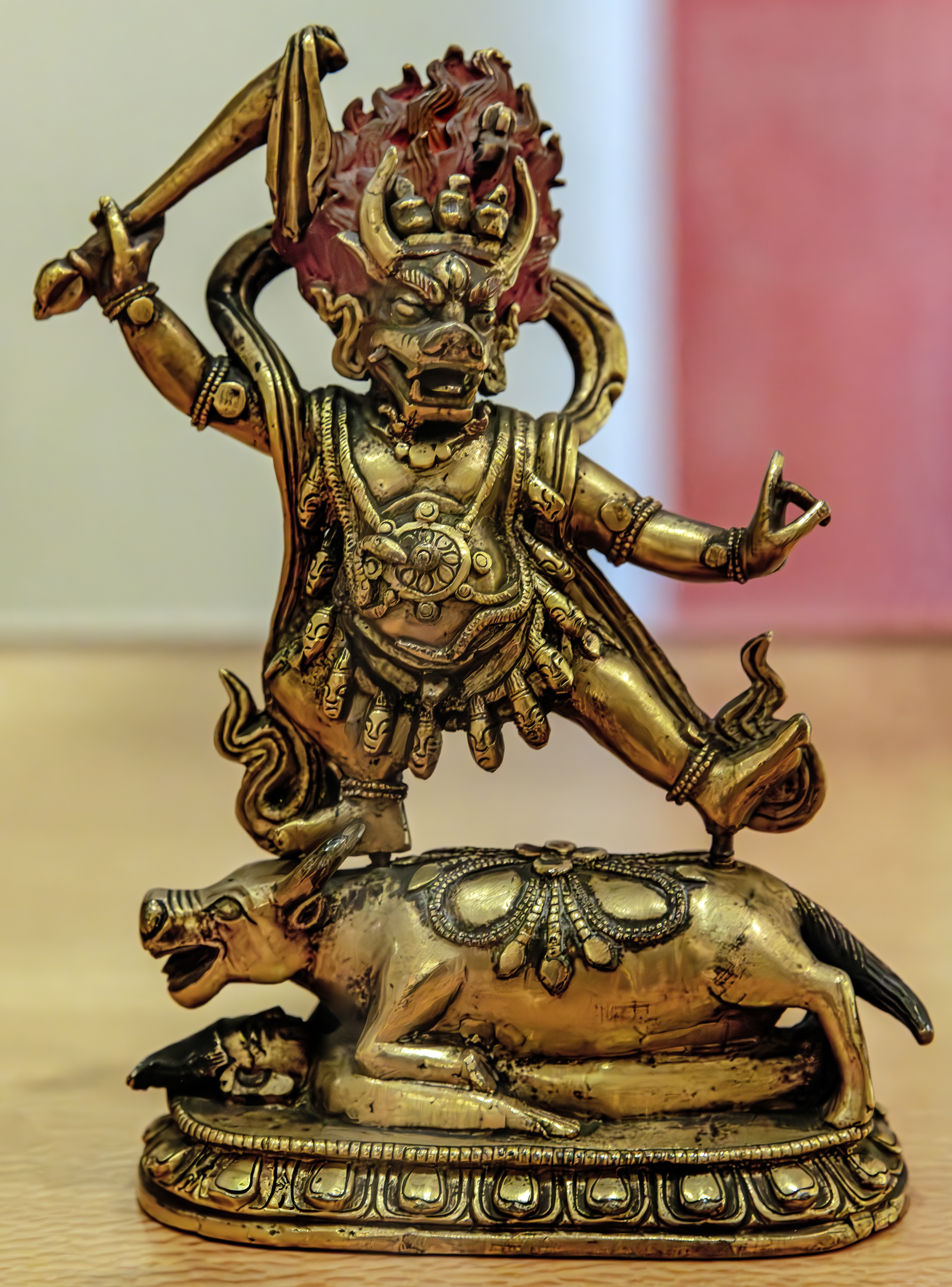
Yama (Buddhism) Musée Labit -France

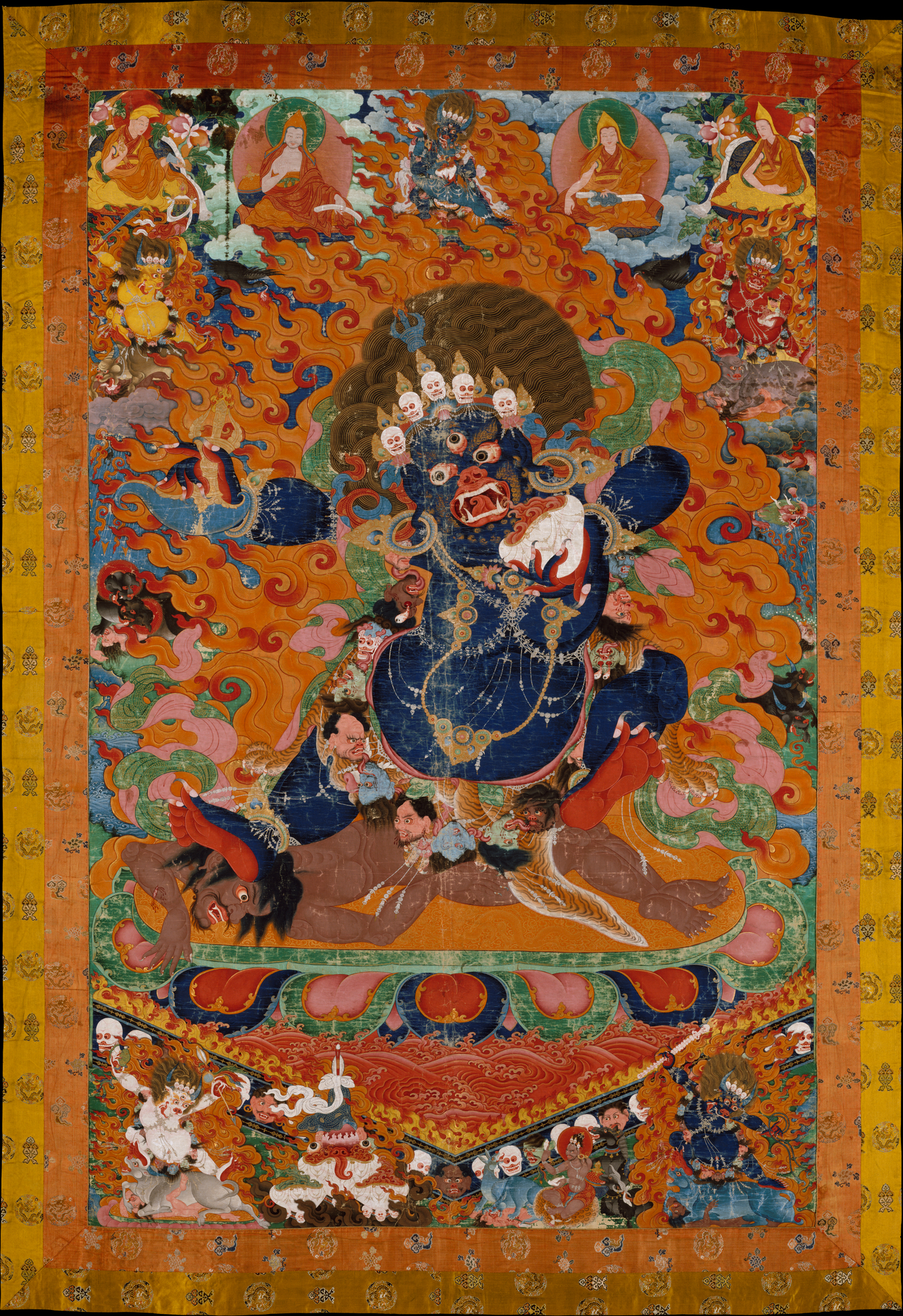
Yama, Met Museum

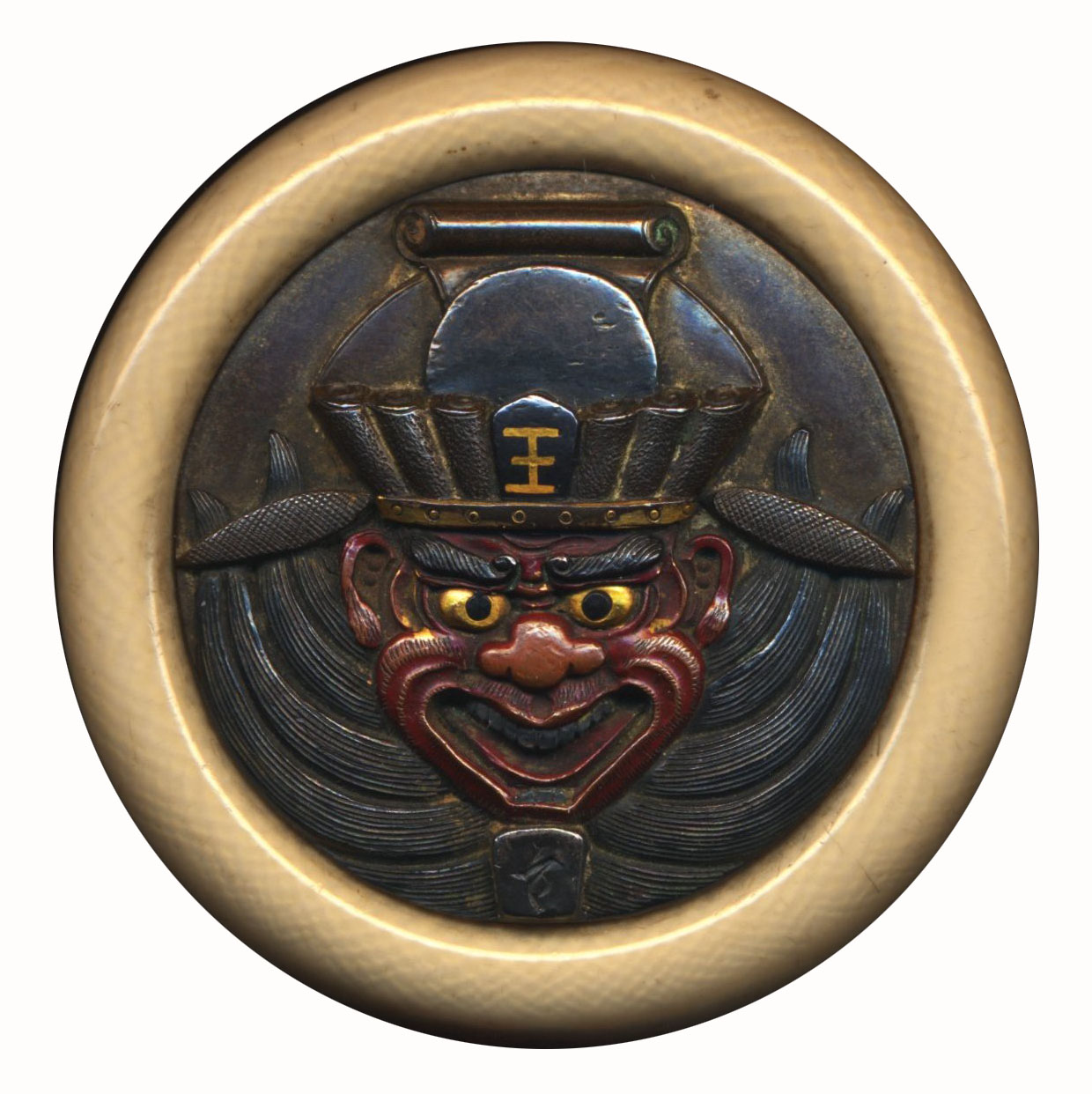
19th century kagamibuta netsuke depicting Enma

He is often depicted with the head of a buffalo, three round eyes, sharp horns entwined with flame, fierce and angry. In his right hand he often has a stick with a skull and in his left a lasso. On his head he has a crown of skulls. In many depictions he is standing on a recumbent bull crushing a man lying on his back. He is also portrayed with an erect penis.

== See also ==
- Bon Festival
- City God (China) (城隍公; Cheng Huang Gong)
- Ghost Festival
- Heibai Wuchang (黑白无常)
- Jiang Ziwen
- Kṣitigarbha (地藏王)
- List of death deities
- Meng Po (孟婆)
- Naraka and Avīci
- Ox-Head and Horse-Face (牛头马面)
- Yamantaka (Manjushri)
- Yomi (Japan)
- Zhong Kui (钟馗)
