= Kyoto Prefectural Library =

Library in Kyoto, Japan

- 京都府立図書館 (Kyoto Furitsu Toshokan)
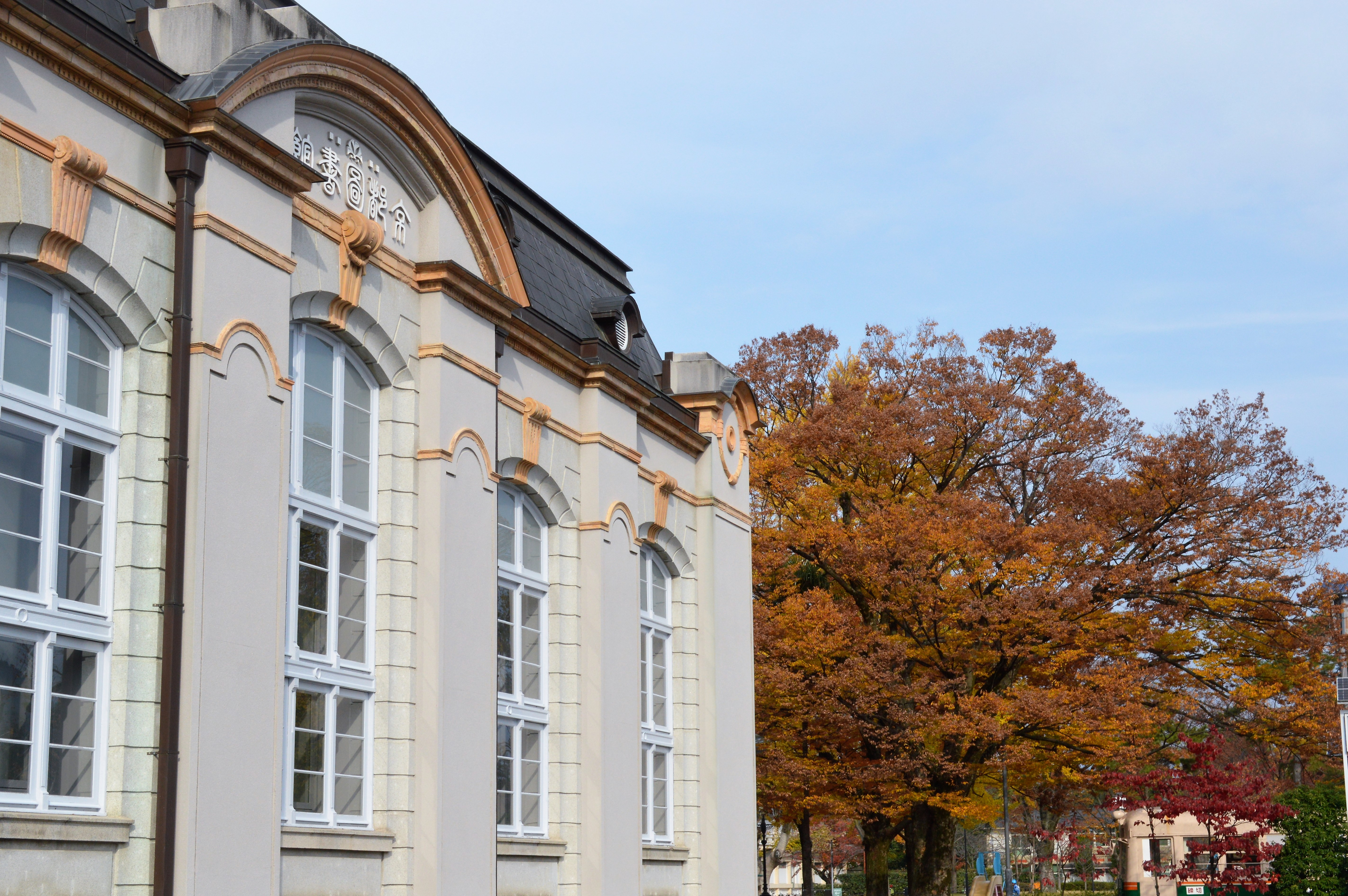
- 35°0′46.6″N 135°46′55″E
- Location: Seishoji-cho, Okazaki, Sakyo-ku, Kyoto, Japan
- Type: Prefectural library
- Established: 1898

Collection
- Items collected: books, journals, newspapers, maps
- Size: 1,256,599 items (2016)
- Criteria for collection: Publications issued in Japan

Access and use
- Population served: General public

Other information
- Budget: JPY 4999M (FY2014)
- Website: http://www.library.pref.kyoto.jp/

Kyoto Prefectural Library (京都府立図書館 Kyōto Furitsu Toshokan) is a prefectural library located in Seishoji-cho 9, Okazaki, Sakyō-ku, Kyoto, Kyoto Prefecture. It was established in 1873, and is supported by the Kyoto prefectural government.

== History ==
- 1873: Opened as Shushoin Library (Closed 1882)
- 1898: Opened as the Kyoto Prefectural Library in Kyoto-gyoen
- 1909: Opened as the Kyoto Prefectural Library in Okazaki, Kyoto
- 1963: Many books transferred to the Kyoto Prefectural Library and Archives
- 1995: The main building suffered serious damage in the Great Hanshin earthquake
- 2001: Opened as a new building

== Branch libraries ==
- 1949: Kawaramachi Branch Library opened (Closed May 1976)
- 1950: Fushimi Branch Library opened. (Closed March 1988)
- 1950: Miyazu Region Branch Library opened. (Closed March 1997)
- 1950: Ayabe Region Branch Library opened. (Closed September 1966)
- 1950: Mineyama Region Branch Library opened. (Closed March 1997)
- 1951: Kamigyo Branch Library opened. (Closed May 1976)
- 1952: Sonobe Region Branch Library opened. (Closed November 1966)
- 1952: Kitakuwata Region Branch Library opened. (Closed March 1980)
- 1952: Kizu Region Branch Library opened. (Closed March 1975)
- 1957: Nakagyo Branch Library opened by taking over administration of Kawaramachi Branch Library. (Closed March 2001)
