= No. 123 Locomotive (National Cultural Property of Japan) =

Japanese locomotive class

No. 123
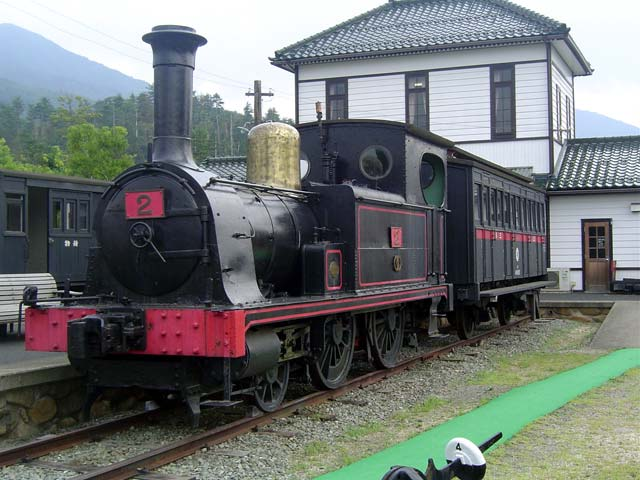
- The locomotive in 2005.
Type and origin
- Power type: Steam
- Builder: Robert Stephenson and Company
- Build date: 1873
- Total produced: 4
Specifications
- Configuration
  - AAR: 2-4-0
- Gauge: 1,067 mm (3 ft 6 in)
- Length: 7,981 mm (26 ft 2 1/4 in)
- Width: 2,148 mm (7 ft 5/8 in)
- Height: 3,589 mm (11 ft 9 1/4 in)
Career
- First run: 1874
- Last run: 1956
- Preserved: 3 world-wide of this type, only one in Japan
- Disposition: Preserved as a cultural monument

The No. 123 Locomotive is an historic steam locomotive, designated as a National Cultural Property of Japan.

== History ==
The locomotive was one of a series of twelve units ordered from Great Britain, split among four manufacturers, to be used on the opening of the Osaka-Kobe railway on May 11, 1874. No. 123 is one of four that were sourced from the Robert Stephenson and Company.

The unit was built in Great Britain in 1873, arriving in Japan in 1874. It underwent technical trials shortly after arrival, and started revenue service when the line was opened that same year. Initially running between Kyoto, Osaka and Kobe, in 1909 it was transferred to the Kanazawa engine depot, then was transferred to the Hikami Railway in Shimane Prefecture in 1915. It was then transferred to the Kaya Railway (now Kaya Kosan Co., Ltd.) in Kyoto Prefecture when the railway opened in October 1926. It is one of four side-tank steam locomotives with a 2-4-0 wheel arrangement that were manufactured in 1873 by Robert Stephenson & Co for the railway.

No. 123 was used in freight service before World War II, then pulled passenger trains after the war. It was withdrawn from service in 1956, having run over 297,000 km in the last 80 years before retirement.

== Preservation and significance ==
In 1977, the locomotive was then placed on display at the "Kaya Steam Locomotive Square" on the grounds of Kaya Station, part of 20 pieces of rolling stock related to the railway. The museum closed in 2020. It was designated as a National Cultural Property in June 2005. The locomotive is one of only three preserved locomotives of this type, the other two being in Norway and Egypt. It is significant in that it has hardly been modified since it was built, preserving the original look and build of the type.

== Technical details ==
The locomotive is built to the 1067 mm rail gauge with a 2-4-0 wheel arrangement. The side-tank locomotive is equipped with Stephenson valve gears. Its maximum dimensions are 7981mm in length, 2148mm in width, and 3589mm in height. Locomotives of this type were designated as Imperial Government Railway of Japan Class 230, serving as technical guides for the first Japanese domestic build steam locomotives (JGR Class 860, built in 1893).

== See also ==
- Japan Railways locomotive numbering and classification
