= Kyoto City Library of Historical Documents =

- 京都市歴史資料館
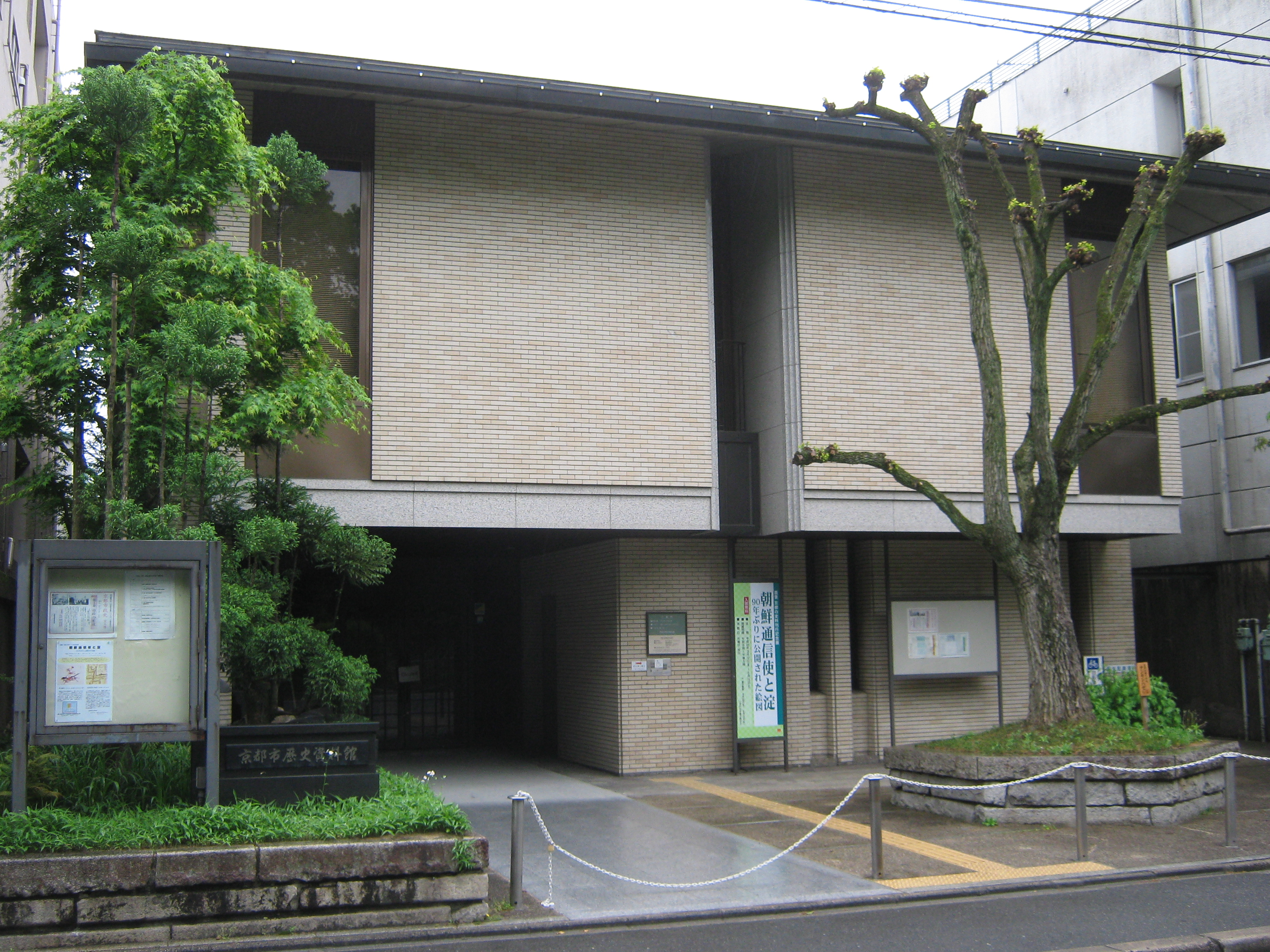
- Interactive map of the Kyoto City Library of Historical Documents area

General information
- Location: 38-1 Matsukage-chō, Kojinguchi-sagaru, Teramachi, Kamigyō-ku, Kyoto, Kyoto Prefecture, Japan
- Coordinates: 35°01′09″N 135°46′04″E
- Opened: November 1982

Website
- Official website

Kyoto City Library of Historical Documents (京都市歴史資料館, Kyōto-shi rekishi shiryōkan) opened in Kyoto, Japan, in 1982. The museum's collection of over ninety thousand items relevant to the history of Kyoto includes materials relating to the Yase Dōji that have been designated an Important Cultural Property.

== See also ==
- Kyoto National Museum
- Kyoto Institute, Library and Archives (Rekisaikan)
