= Yoshimine-dera =

Buddhist temple in Nishikyō-ku, Kyoto, Japan

- 善峯寺
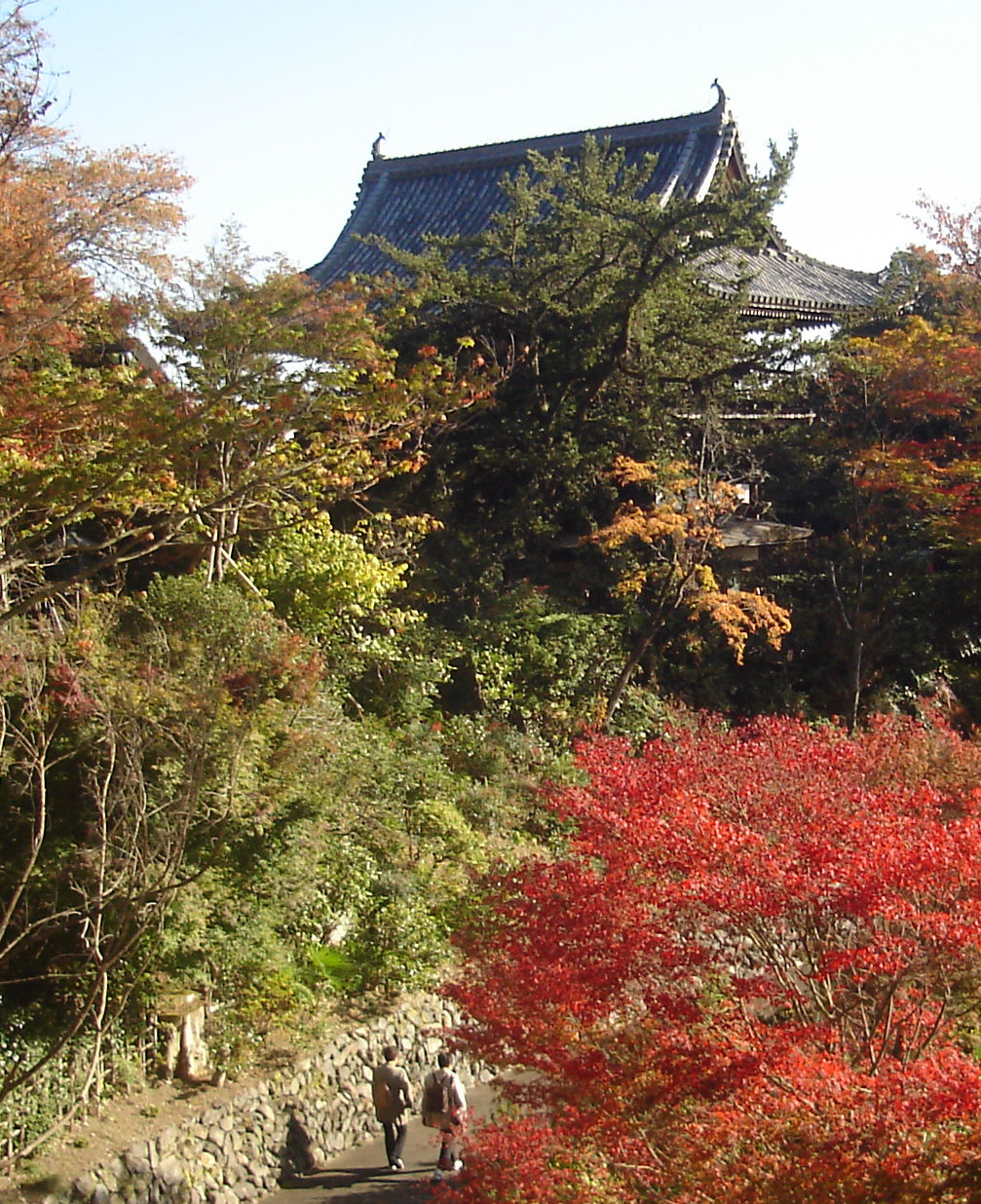
- Yoshimine-dera Sanmon

- Location within Kyoto Prefecture Location within Japan

Religion
- Affiliation: Buddhist
- Deity: Jūichimen Kannon
- Rite: Tendai
- Status: functional

Location
- Location: 1372 Oharano Oshio-cho, Nishikyo-ku, Kyoto-shi, Kyoto-fu
- Interactive map of Yoshimine-dera
- Coordinates: 34°56′17.4″N 135°38′39.1″E

Architecture
- Founder: c.Gensan, Emperor Mommu
- Completed: c.1029

Website
- Official website
- National Important Cultural Property

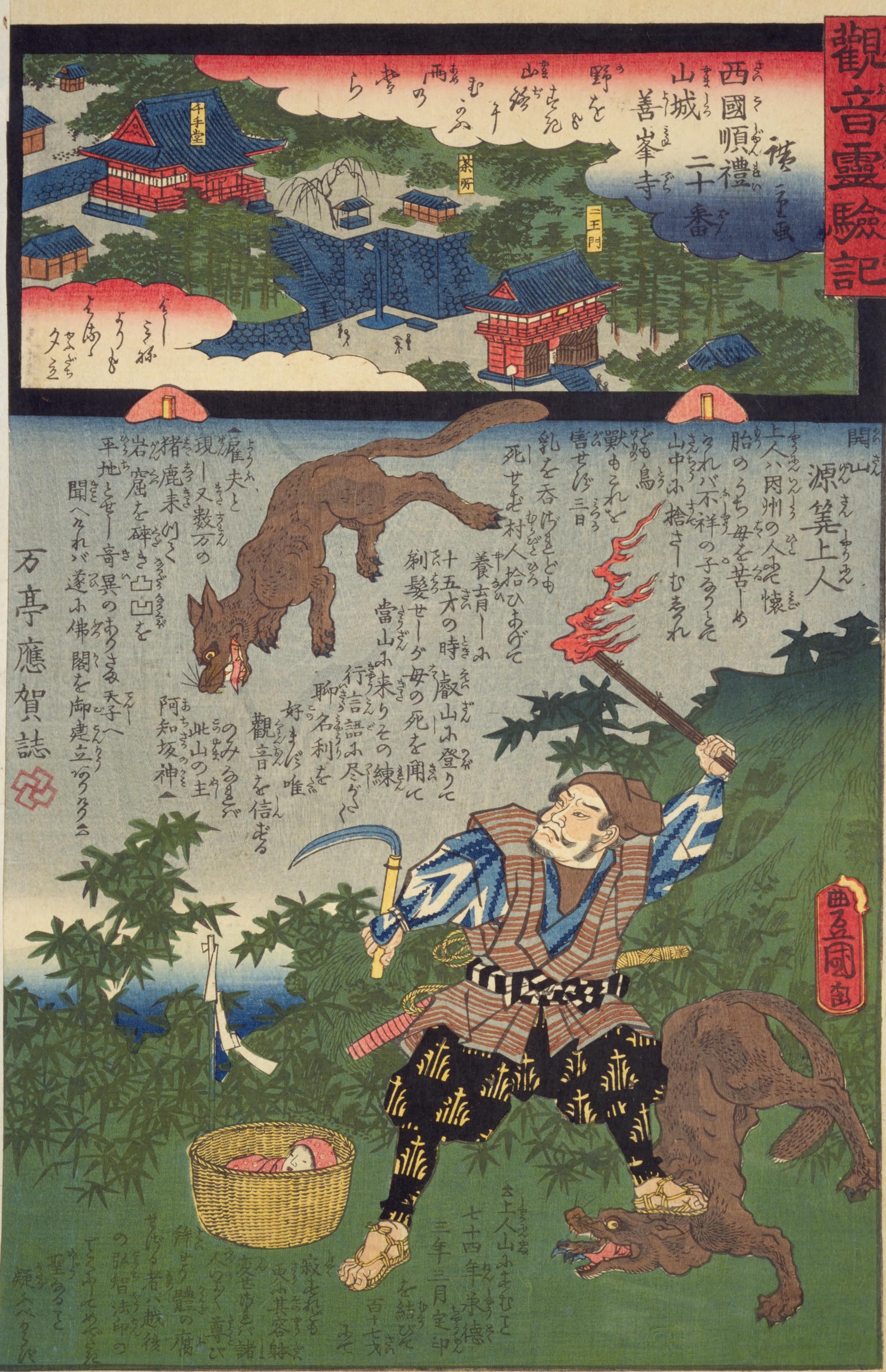
from the picture album "Kannon Reigen ki"

Yoshimine-dera (善峯寺) is a Buddhist temple located in the Ōharano neighborhood of Nishikyō-ku, Kyoto, Japan. It belongs to the Tendai sect of Japanese Buddhism and its honzon are two hibutsu statues of Jūichimen Kannon. The temple's full name is Nishiyama Yoshimine-dera (西山 善峯寺). The temple grounds are located on Yoshimine, a northeastern branch of Mount Shaka (630.8 meters above sea level), near the southwestern edge of Kyoto City. Numerous buildings are scattered across the mountainside. The temple is the 20th stop on the Saigoku Kannon Pilgrimage route.

== Overview ==
The origin of the temple is uncertain. According to the "Zenpo-ji Engi Emaki" (Edo period) handed down at the temple, the temple was founded in 1029 at the age of 47 when Gensan, a disciple of Genshin, entered the mountain and built a small chapel, enshrining a Jūichimen Kannon statue he had made as the principal image. Later, in 1034, Emperor Go-Ichijō designated the temple as a place of imperial prayer and bestowed the name "Ryōhō-ji" (良峯寺). In 1042, Emperor Go-Suzaku ordered the transfer of a Jūichimen Kannon statue made by Ninkō-hoshi, from a temple called Washiō-ji in the Kyoto to the temple as its new principal image. Emperor Shirakawa also donated the Hondō, Amida-dō, Yakushi-dō, Jizo-dō, three-story pagoda, Shōrō bell tower, Niōmon Gate, and Chinjū-sha shrine buildings. In 1192, during the early Kamakura period, Jien lived here, and the temple was given a plaque with the name "Zenpō-ji" (善峯寺) written by Emperor Go-Toba, and the temple's name was changed accordingly. After Shōkū, a disciple of Hōnen served as the chief priest, many princes entered the temple, some relocating from Shōren-in, and the temple became a monzeki establishment, known as the "Nishiyama Monzeki" (西山門跡).

The temple was revered by members of the imperial family, including Emperor Go-Saga and Emperor Go-Fukakusa, and the temple buildings were renovated with a donation from Emperor Go-Hanazono. At one point, the number of monks' quarters reached 52 during the Muromachi period. However, during the Ōnin War of 1467-1477, much of the temple was burned down. During the Edo period, Keishōin, the mother of the fifth shōgun of the Tokugawa shogunate, Tokugawa Tsunayoshi, became a major patron, and the temple was rebuilt.

Notable features include the "Gliding Dragon" pine tree (Yōryu no matsu, a natural monument), which was trained to grow horizontally and was once over 50 meters long,

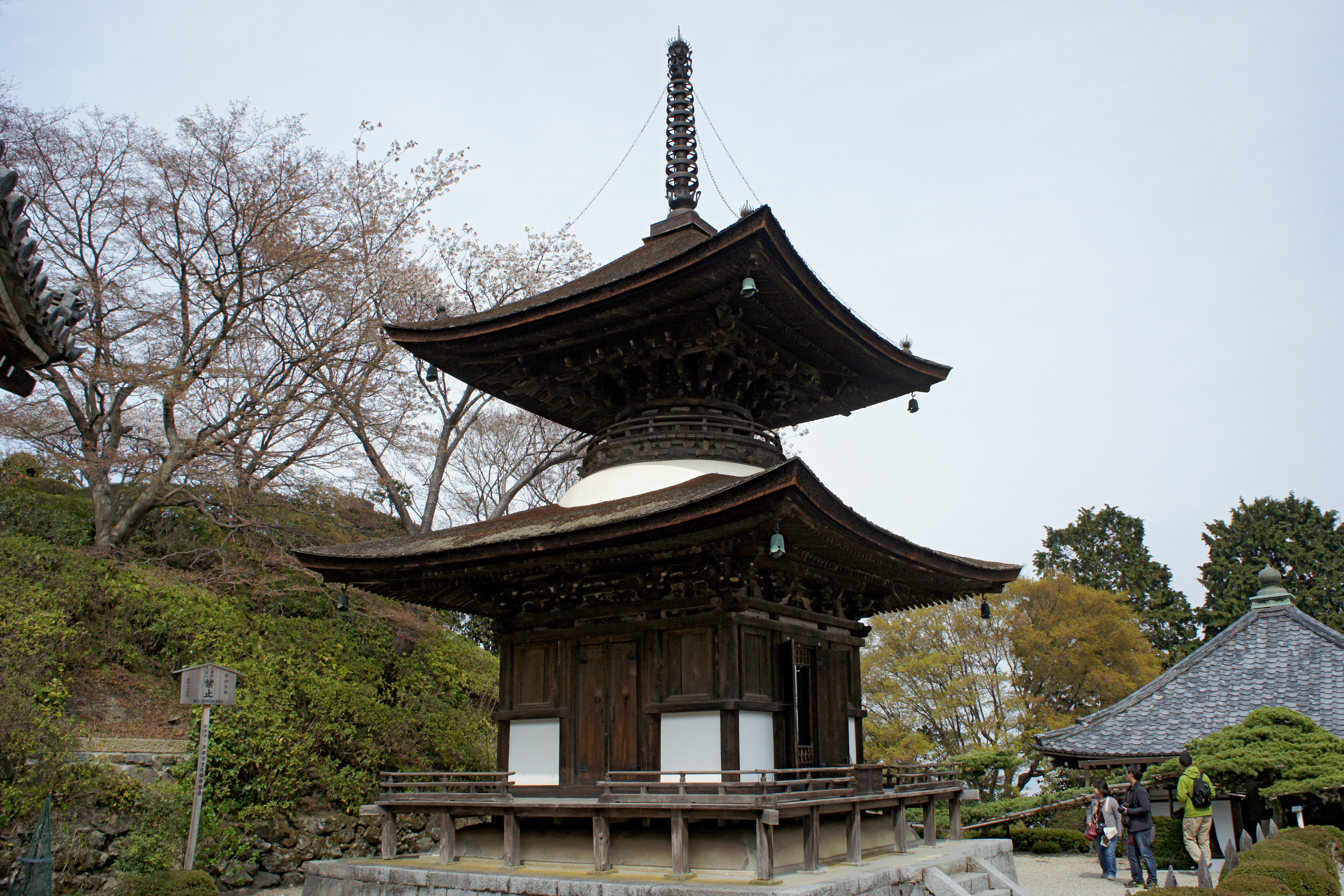
Tahōtō (ICP)

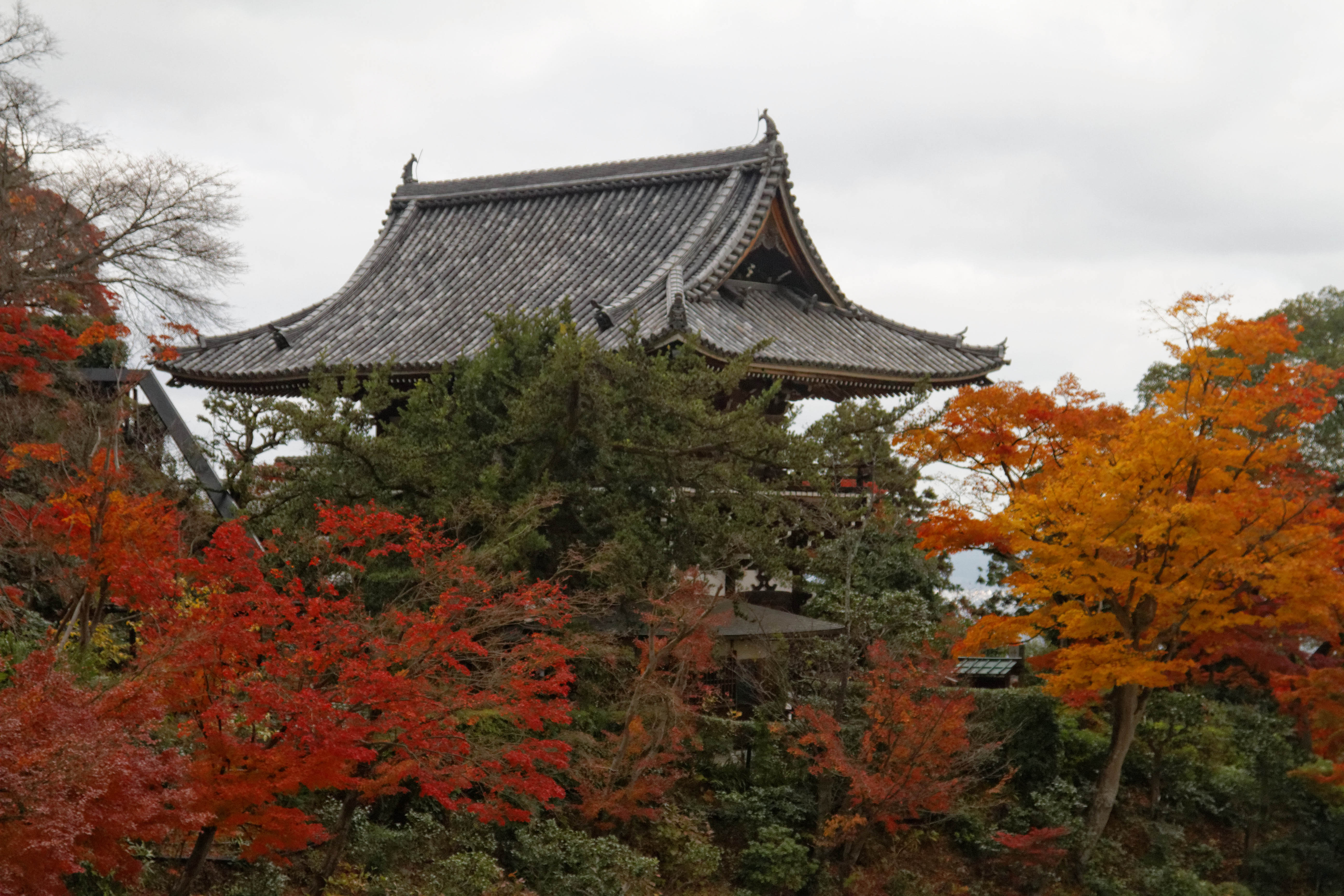
Sanmon

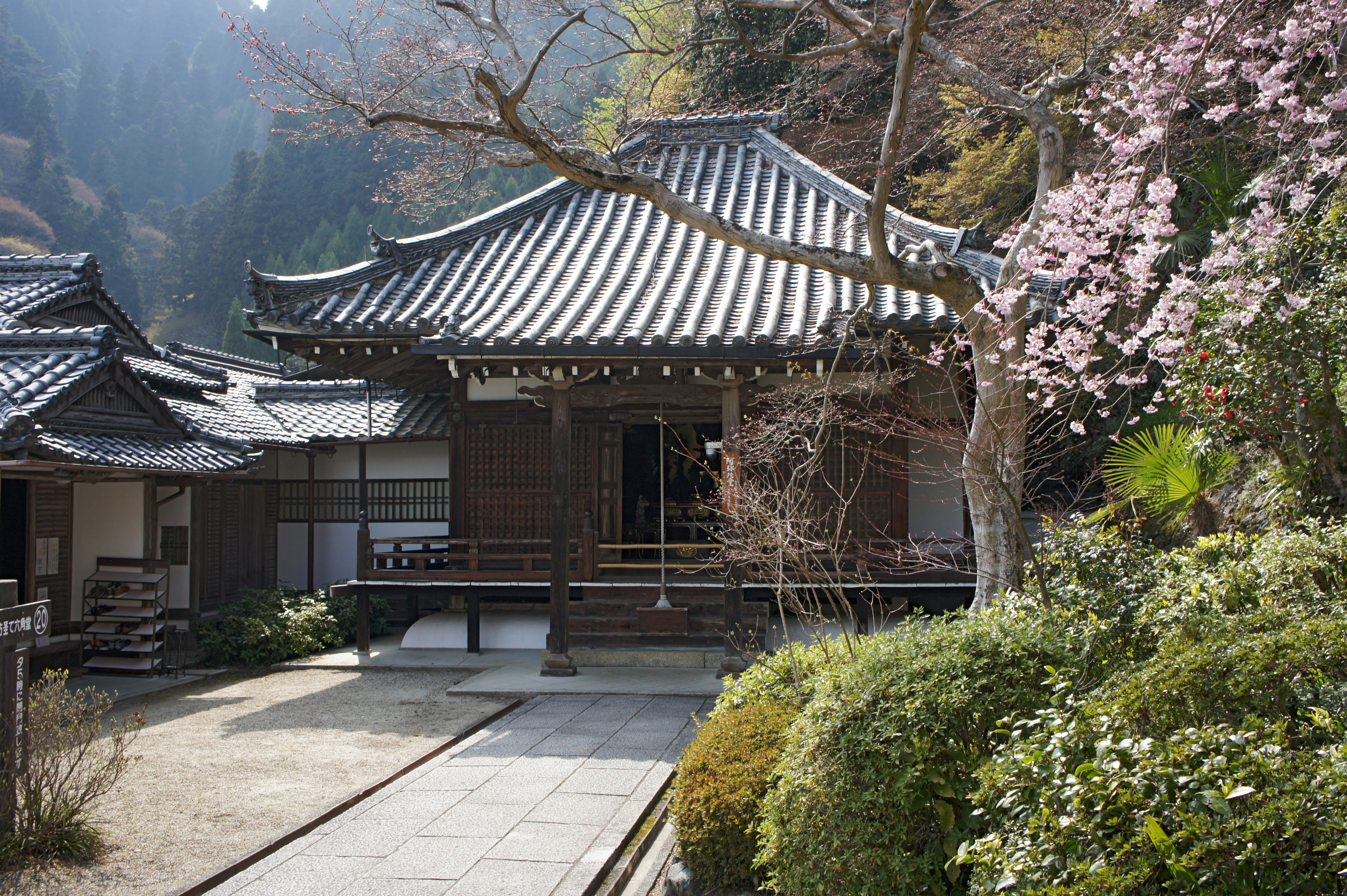
Amida-dō

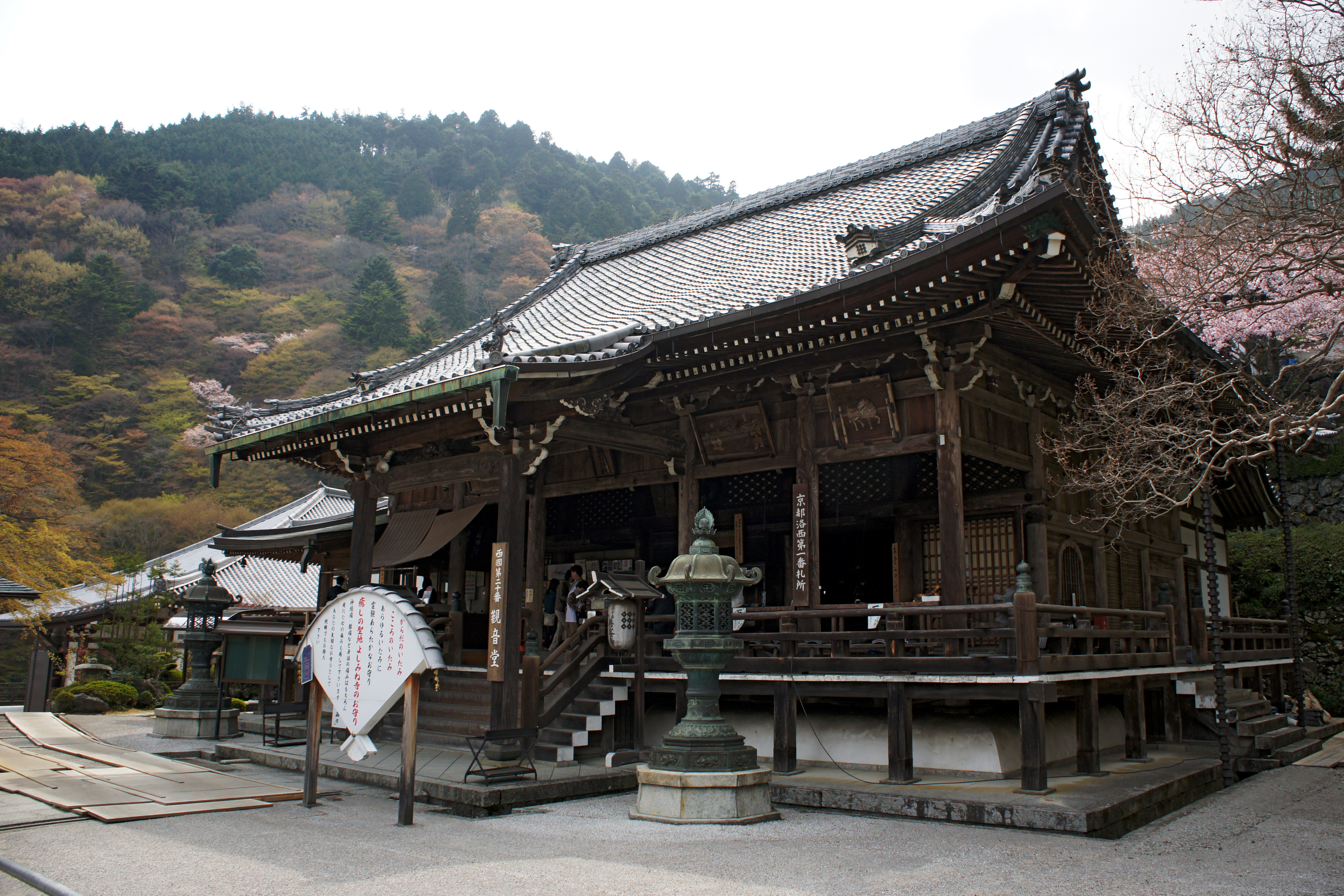
Kannon-dō

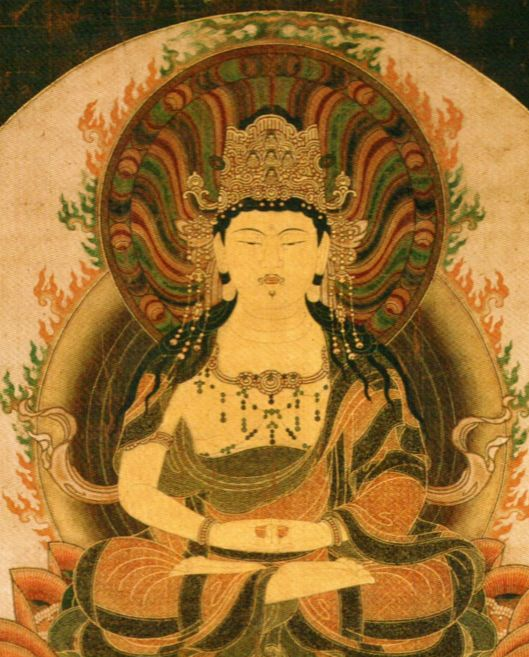
Crowned Amida

The temple is approximately 7 kilometers or 17 minutes by car from Nagaoka-Tenjin Station on the JR West Hankyu Railway.

== Cultural Properties ==
=== National Important Cultural Properties ===
- Tahōtō (多宝塔), Edo period (1621)
- {{nihongo|Colored silk painting of Daigensui-Myōō|絹本著色大元帥明王像|}|}, Kamakura period

=== Kyoto Prefectural Designated Tangible Cultural Properties ===
- Yoshimine-dera Pilgrimage Mandala (善峰寺参詣曼荼羅), Edo period;
- Sankō-ji Pilgrimage Mandala (三鈷寺参詣曼荼羅), Edo period;
- Hondo (本堂), Edo period;
- Yakushi-dō (薬師堂), Edo period;
- Amida-dō (阿弥陀堂), Edo period;
- Kyō-dō (経堂), Edo period;
- Kaisan-dō (開山堂), Edo period;
- Goma-dō (護摩堂), Edo period;
- Shōrō (鐘楼), Edo period;
- Sanmon (山門), Edo period;
- Chiju-dō (鎮守堂[), 3 structures, Edo period;
- Hōkyōintō (鎮守堂[), Kamakura period;
