= JGR Class 860 =

Japanese type 2-4-2T locomotive

Class 860
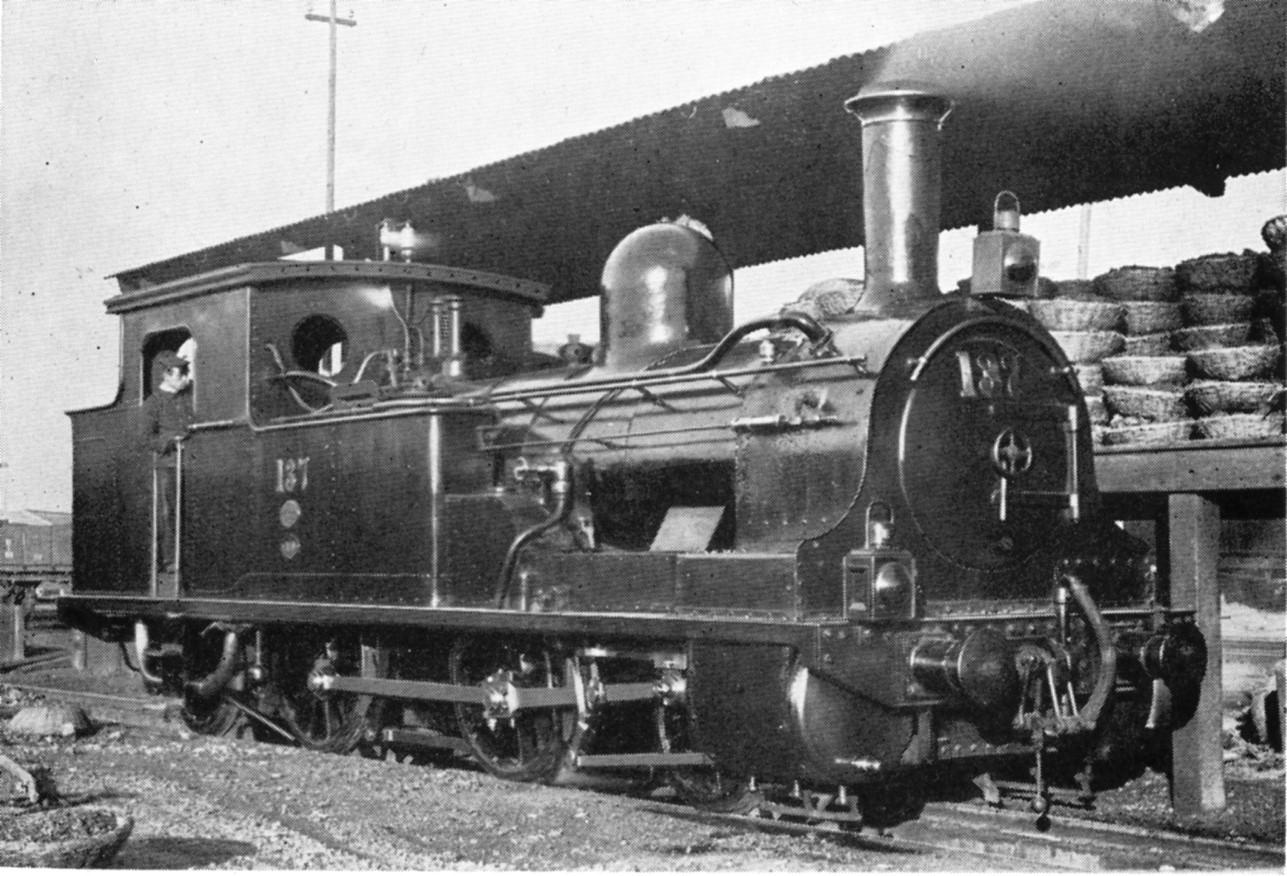
- The first locomotive built in Japan
Type and origin
- Power type: Steam
- Designer: Richard Francis Trevithick
- Builder: JNR - Kobe
- Build date: 1893
- Total produced: 1
Specifications
- Configuration
  - Whyte: 2-4-2 Tank locomotive
- Gauge: 1,067 mm (3 ft 6 in)
- Leading dia.: 965 mm (3 ft 2.0 in)
- Driver dia.: 1.346 m (4 ft 5.0 in)
- Trailing dia.: 965 mm (3 ft 2.0 in)
- Wheelbase: 5.944 m (19 ft 6.0 in)
- Length: 9.652 m (31 ft 8.0 in)
- Fuel type: Coal
- Water cap.: 4.5 m^{3} (1,189 US gal)
- Firebox
  - Grate area: 1.11 m^{2} (12 sq ft)
- Heating surface: 71.48 m^{2} (769 sq ft)
Performance figures
- Tractive effort: 4,890 kgf (48.0 kN; 10,800 lbf) (single), 3,390 kgf (33.2 kN; 7,500 lbf) (double)

The JGR Class 860 was the first steam railway locomotive built in Japan. Some parts were provided by foreign manufacturers, but the compound 381 mm × 508 mm (15 in × 20 in) high-pressure and 572 mm × 508 mm (23 in × 20 in) low-pressure cylinders were constructed in Japan. The compound design reduced coal consumption by 15 to 20 percent, but the locomotive was difficult to handle, so no more of the type were built. The locomotive spent its last years on Sakhalin.

== See also ==
- Japan Railways locomotive numbering and classification
