= Kyoto Institute, Library and Archives =

Facility in Kyoto, Japan

- 京都府立京都学・歴彩館
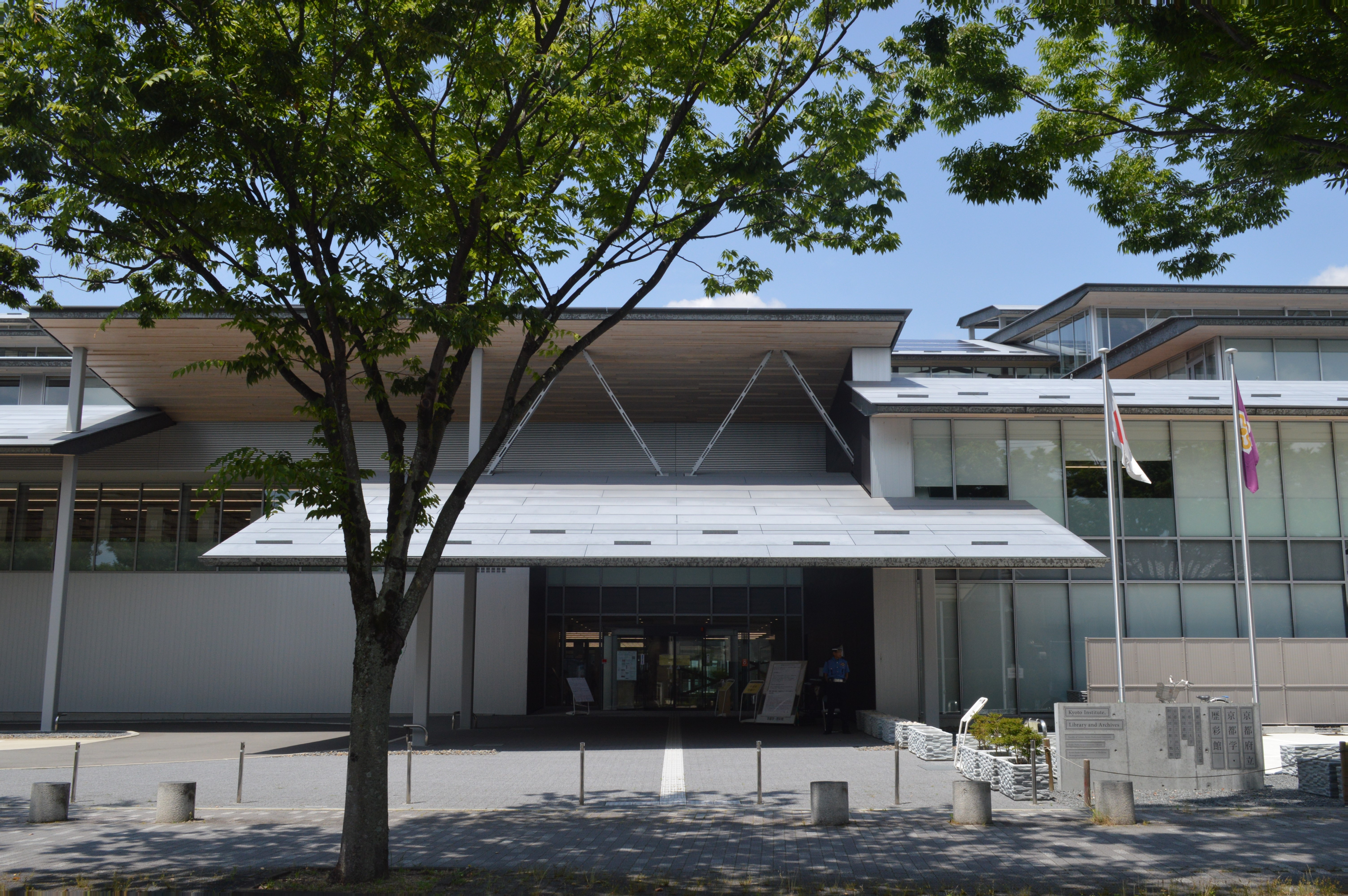
- Interactive map of the Kyoto Institute, Library and Archives area

General information
- Location: 1-29 Shimogamo Hangi-chō, Sakyō-ku, Kyoto, Kyoto Prefecture, Japan
- Coordinates: 35°02′54″N 135°46′01″E
- Opened: 28 April 2017

Website
- Official website (in Japanese)

Kyoto Institute, Library and Archives (京都府立京都学・歴彩館, Kyōto Furitsu Kyōto Gaku・Rekisaikan) opened in Sakyō-ku, Kyoto, Japan, in 2017, superseding and replacing the former Kyoto Prefectural Library and Archives [ja], which opened in 1963 and closed in 2016. The facility collects, preserves, researches, and makes public materials relating to Kyoto and its culture. The collection includes the Hyakugō Archives of Tō-ji, a National Treasure.

== See also ==
- List of National Treasures of Japan (ancient documents)
- Kyoto City Library of Historical Documents
- Kyoto Botanical Garden
