= Yase Dōji =

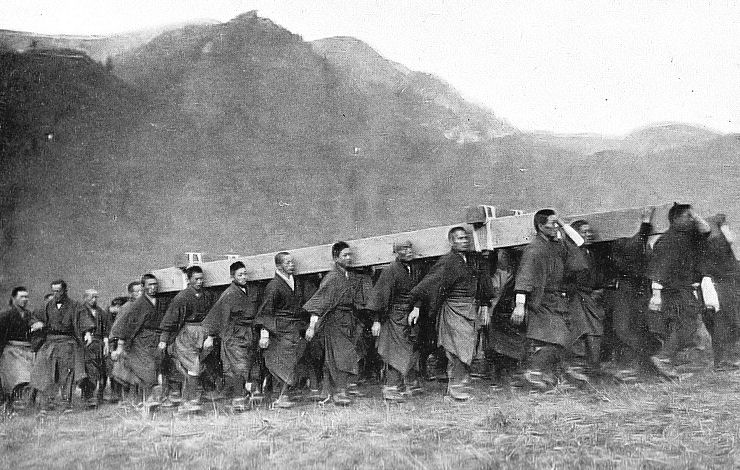
Yase Dōji started training at the news of the death of Emperor Taishō

Yase Dōji (八瀬童子, Yase Dōji, Yaseno Dōji, or Hase Dōji) is the term used for the people of Yase, in Sakyō district, Kyoto, Japan who by tradition bore the sōkaren or portable bier upon which the imperial coffin was placed. In 2010, 741 historical materials relating to the Yase Dōji were designated as Important Cultural Properties.

== Etymology ==
As a prince, the Emperor Tenmu (631–686) was once wounded with an arrow (ya), and went to the steam baths at Yase after which his wound rapidly healed. However, this story is unconfirmed and may be only legend. It is considered more likely that "Yase" derives from the eight (ya) rapids of the river. The term dōji means "children". This derives from the local hairstyle, which appeared very peculiar to the officials from the bakumatsu. By tradition, neither men nor women of Yase cut their bangs, which was similar in appearance to the designated hairstyle of children in feudal Japan.

== History ==
Since antiquity, people living at Yase worked as handymen or palanquin-bearers for people of the temple complex of Enryaku-ji, in Ōtsu. The guild of palanquin bearers was started in 1092, the earliest guild in Japan. In 1336, Emperor Go-Daigo used their palanquin in his escape from Kyoto and afterward exempted them from land taxation. They served as palanquin bearers of all subsequent emperors and retired emperors. In 1569, Oda Nobunaga and in 1603 Emperor Go-Yōzei reaffirmed their tax exemptions.

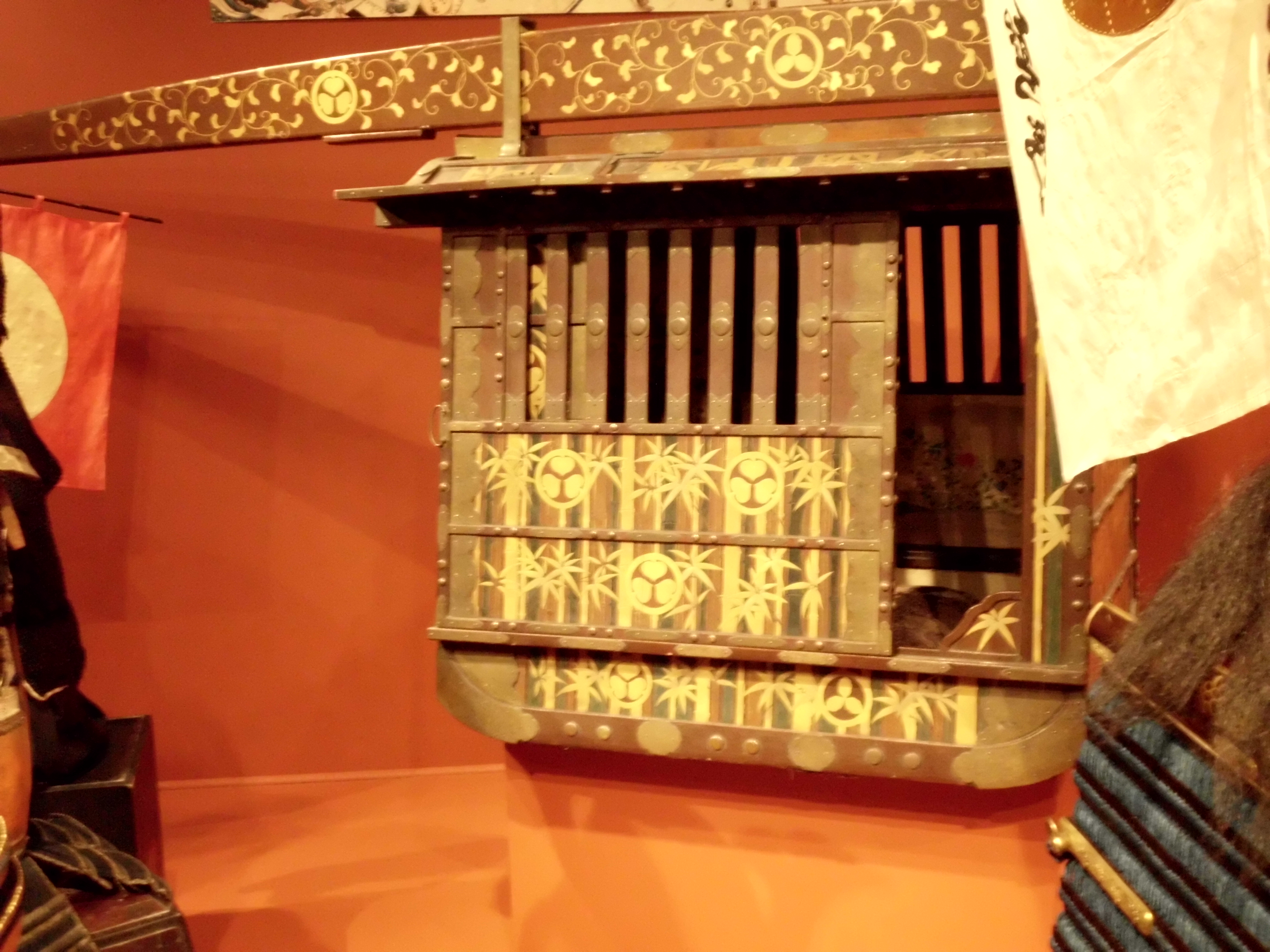
Antique Japanese palanquin for a noble

=== Conflict ===
Originally, the people of Yase had the right to go into the mountains of Enryaku-ji for food and firewood, and they were proud of their tax exempt status given by the emperor. However, in the Edo era, their privileges were curtailed by the Buddhist prince Kobenhosshin-no (1669–1716) who denied the right to go into the mountains of Yase. The people of Yase strongly and repeatedly asked the Edo Shogunate for the restoration of their rights. The sixth shōgun Tokugawa Ienobu himself wrote the letters of judgement in favor of the Yase people, using simple kana letters so the people of Yase, as commoners with limited education, could understand. For this restoration, Akimoto Tajimanokami worked for the people of Yase, such that after his death, he was enshrined and honored for his efforts. In addition, they started a folk dance in his honor, called the pardoned land dance. Arai Hakuseki wrote that the basis of judgements was precedents.

=== Meiji Era ===
Documents of Yase village recorded that they served as bearers of palanquins in Tokyo in the Meiji era. Citing the book Meiji no Gyoko (Travels of Emperor Meiji), Inose wrote that about 100 Yase people joined in Emperor Meiji's first trip to Tokyo in 1868 as bearers of the palanquin; ten people remained in Tokyo. It was an important point when the Meiji Imperial Household Agency recognized that the Yase people would serve as bearers of Imperial palanquins. The Imperial Household Agency solved the problem of Yase's rescinded tax exemptions by paying their taxes to the shogunate. In addition, 16 villagers were employed by the agency. Each member worked for three years, until another member came to replace him. The funeral of the mother of Emperor Meiji, Empress Eishō was the largest funeral, in which 70 Yase people served as bearers of the palanquin.

== Funeral of Emperor Meiji ==
On September 14, 1912, the Sōukaren was carried by Yase people from Momoyama Station in the suburbs of Kyoto to the Tomb of Emperor Meiji in the classical fashion, which took one hour. There was a thin rain and the road was 1 km long up a considerable slope.

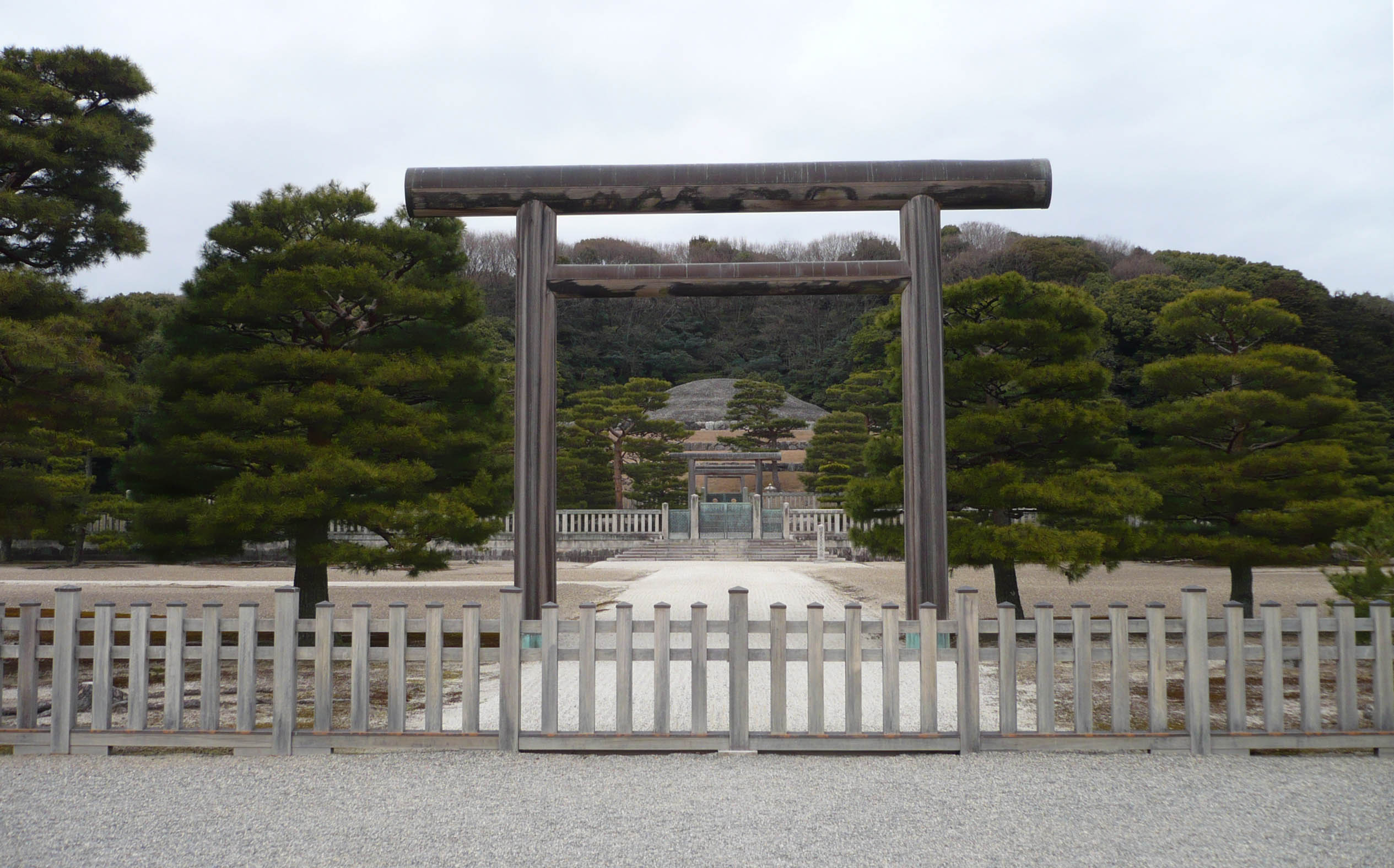
Momoyama Fushimi tomb of Emperor Meiji

== Funeral of Emperor Taishō ==
After the funeral ceremony of Emperor Taisho, the coffin was transferred to the Sōkaren, at the ceremony hall late at night, on February 7, 1927. They went under the east gate of Shinjuku Gyoen to the Shinjuku Gyoen Special Station. There were eight coaches, the coffin was inside the fourth coach and Yase people rode in the last coach. The special train reached Asakawa Station, now Takao Station (Tokyo) at 1:35 am, the next day. The Sōkaren arrived at 2:45 am, carried by 105 Yase people. They were given 10,967 yen and 2875 yen or 2950 yen as a special bonus.

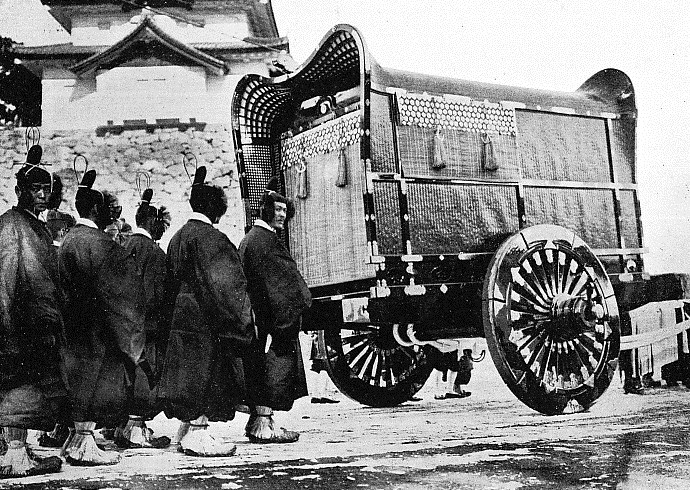
The funeral of Emperor Taishō

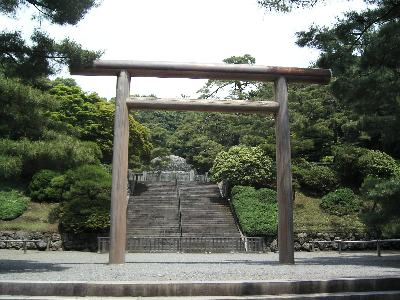
Tama Ryo of Emperor Taishō

== Funeral of Emperor Hirohito ==
In 1989, the coffin of Emperor Hirohito was carried in a motor hearse; and later the sōkaren, the palanquin of Hirohito was carried by 50 members of Imperial Guards in classical dress inside the ceremony campus. People of Yase had asked the Imperial Household Agency to participate, but their request was rejected. Six people from Yase attended the funeral procession as observers.

== See also ==
- Japanese Imperial Rituals

== Cultural references ==
- Keiichirō Ryū Hanato Hi no Mikado (Emperors of flowers and fire) Kodansha, joukan(part 1) ISBN 406185495X gekan(part 2) ISBN 4061854968
- Mikio Nanbara Tennoke no Ninja (Ninja of the Imperial Household) Keizai Shinposha,ISBN 410110025X
- Tomoaki Hayashi Reisen Kadokawa Sneaker Bunko, ISBN 978-4-04-426625-7
