= Nariai-ji =

Buddhist temple in Miyazu, Kyoto, Japan

- 成相寺
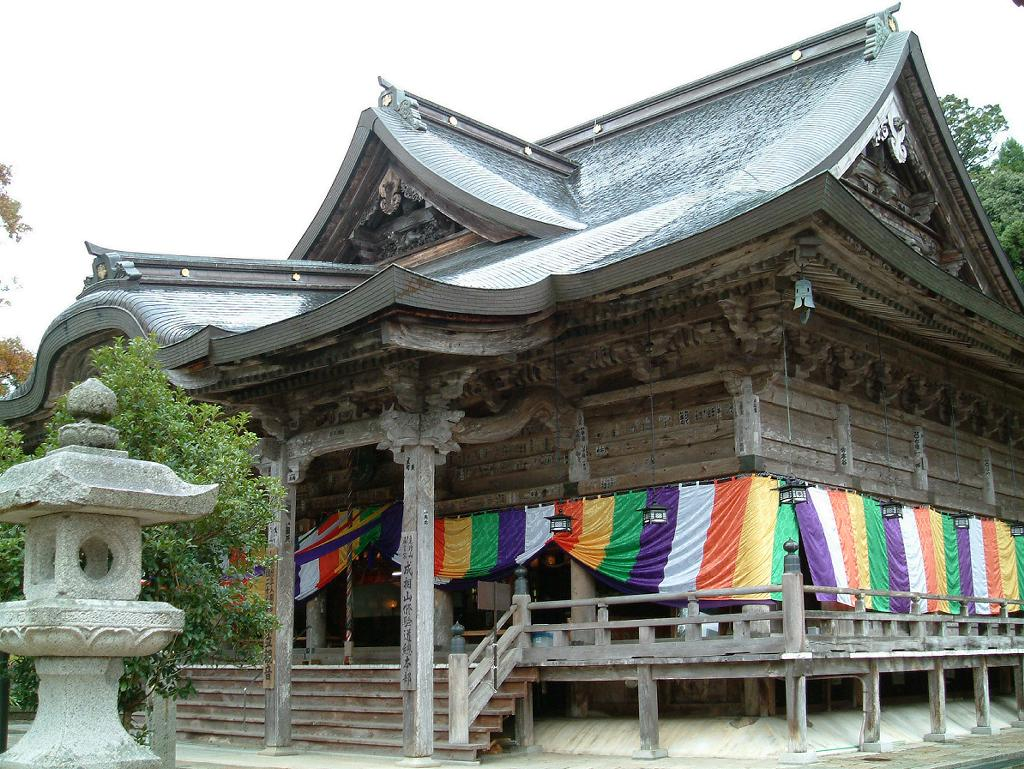
- Nariai-ji Hondō

- Location within Kyoto Prefecture Location within Japan

Religion
- Affiliation: Buddhist
- Deity: Shō-Kannon Bosatsu
- Rite: Hashidate- Shingon sect
- Status: functional

Location
- Location: 229 Nariaiji, Miyazu-shi, Kyoto-fu 629-2241
- Country: Japan
- Interactive map of Nariai-ji
- Coordinates: 35°35′43.58″N 135°11′14.54″E

Architecture
- Founder: c.Emperor Mommu
- Completed: c.704
- National Important Cultural Property National Historic Site of Japan

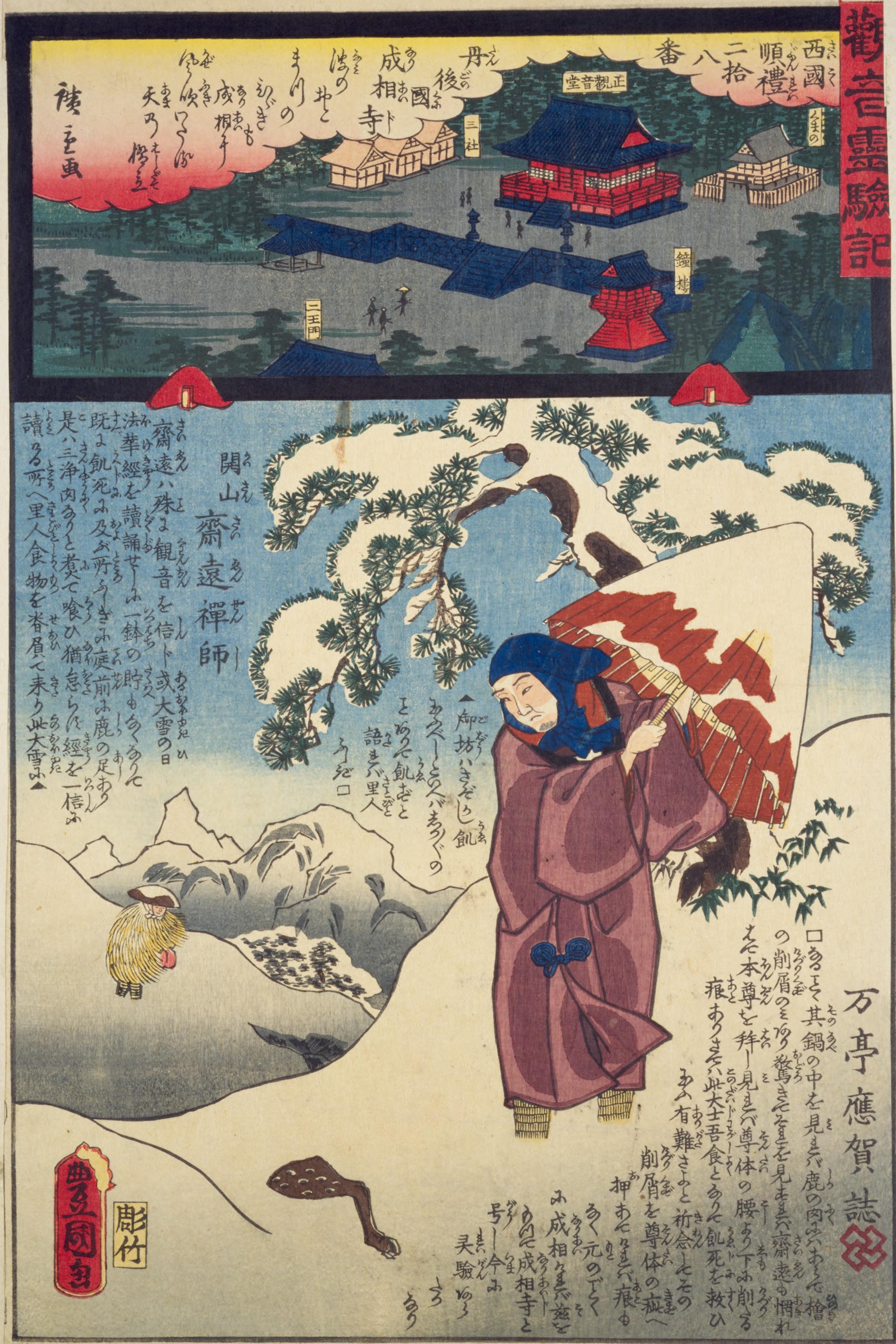
Ukiyoe from “観音霊験記 西国巡礼二拾八番丹後国成相寺 開山斎遠禅師”, in Kan'on reigenki

Nariai-ji (成相寺) is a Buddhist temple located in the Nariai neighborhood of the city of Miyazu, Kyoto Prefecture, Japan. It belongs to the Hashidate Shingon sect of Japanese Buddhism and its honzon (primary image) is a hibutsu (secret / hidden image) statue of Sho-Kannon Bosatsu. The temple's full name is Nariai-san Nariai-ji (成相山 成相寺).The temple is the 28th stop on the 33 temple Saigoku Kannon Pilgrimage route. The temple is located at an elevation of approximately 328 meters on the southeast slope of Mount Tsuzumigatake (569 meters above sea level) overlooking the Amanohashidate, one of Japan's three scenic views. The precincts of the temple were designated a National Historic Site in 2016. In April 2017, the temple was designated a Japan Heritage Site as part of the "Tango Chirimen Corridor" project.

== History ==
According to legends contained in the Konjaku Monogatari, the temple was founded by a monk named Shin'no during the reign of Emperor Mommu in 704. According to this legend, a starving monk prayed to Kannon Bosatsu and found a dead deer at his doorstep. Despite Buddhist prohibitions against eating meat, the desperate monk cut a haunch of meat from the deer, roasted it, and thus avoided starvation. However, the next morning he found that the remnants of his meal had turned into wood chips, and that there was a large chunk cut out of the thigh of the honzon statue of Kannon. He then understood that Kannon Bosatsu had sacrificed itself to save his life.

Despite this legend, there is no reliable historical evidence of Nariai-ji's early history. It is known that the temple was originally located higher up the mountain, and served as a training center for Shugendō sect practitioners. The temple's honzon statue of Shō-Kannon dates from the Heian period, and is a hidden image shown to the public once every 33 years (the last time being in 2005). The temple was relocated to its current location after a landslide in 1400. However, aside from this the temple's early history is unclear.

The temple is depicted in Sesshū's "Amanohashidate Map" (a National Treasure in the Kyoto National Museum) with the inscription "Senosan Jōshō-ji." (世野山成相寺). The temple's Main Hall was rebuilt in 1774. In 2005, a five-story pagoda was added to the temple grounds. In 2007, the temple separated from the Kōyasan Shingon-shū and founded its own Hashidate Shingon sect.

== Images of the temple ==
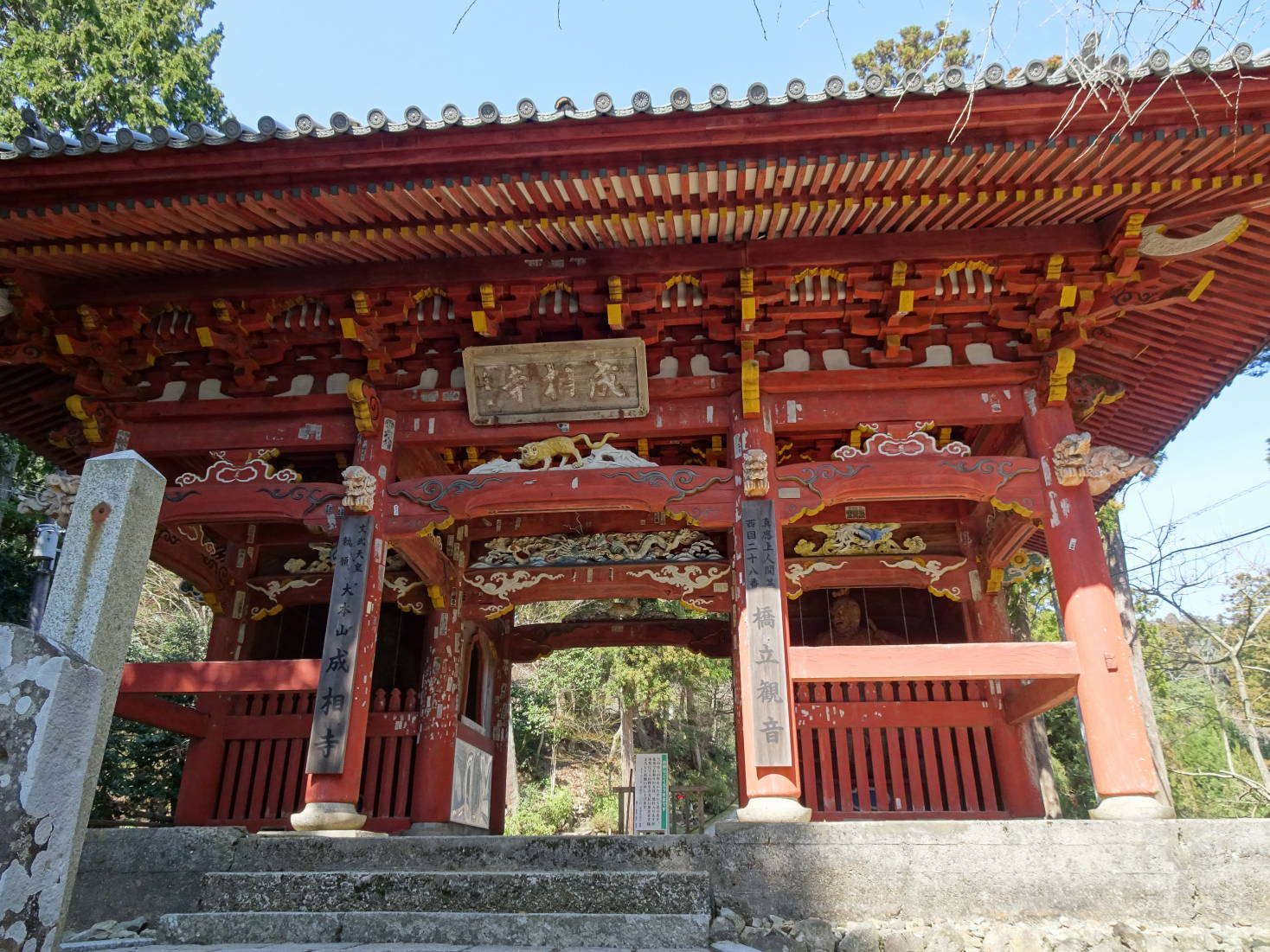
Sanmon

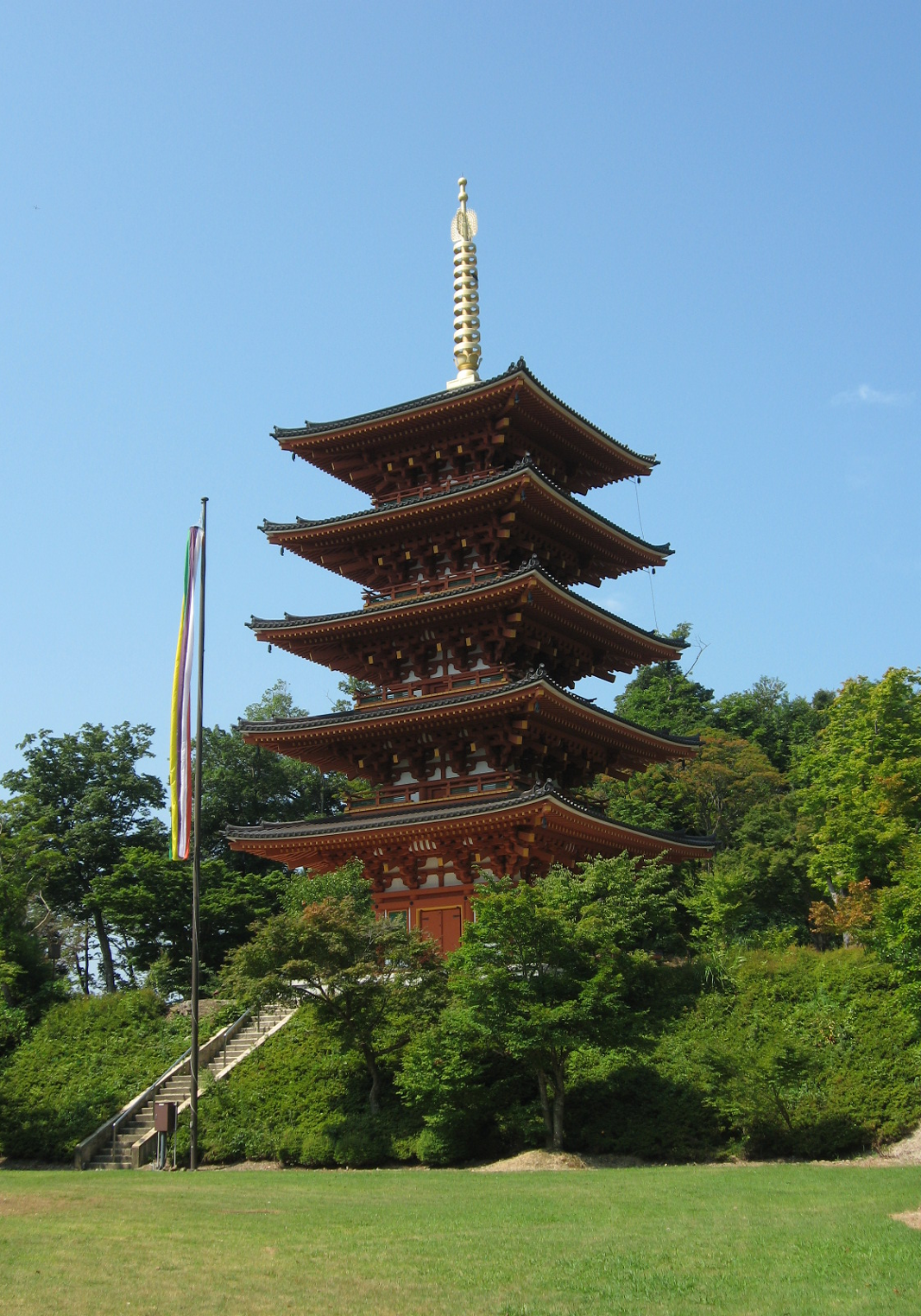
Five-story Pagoda

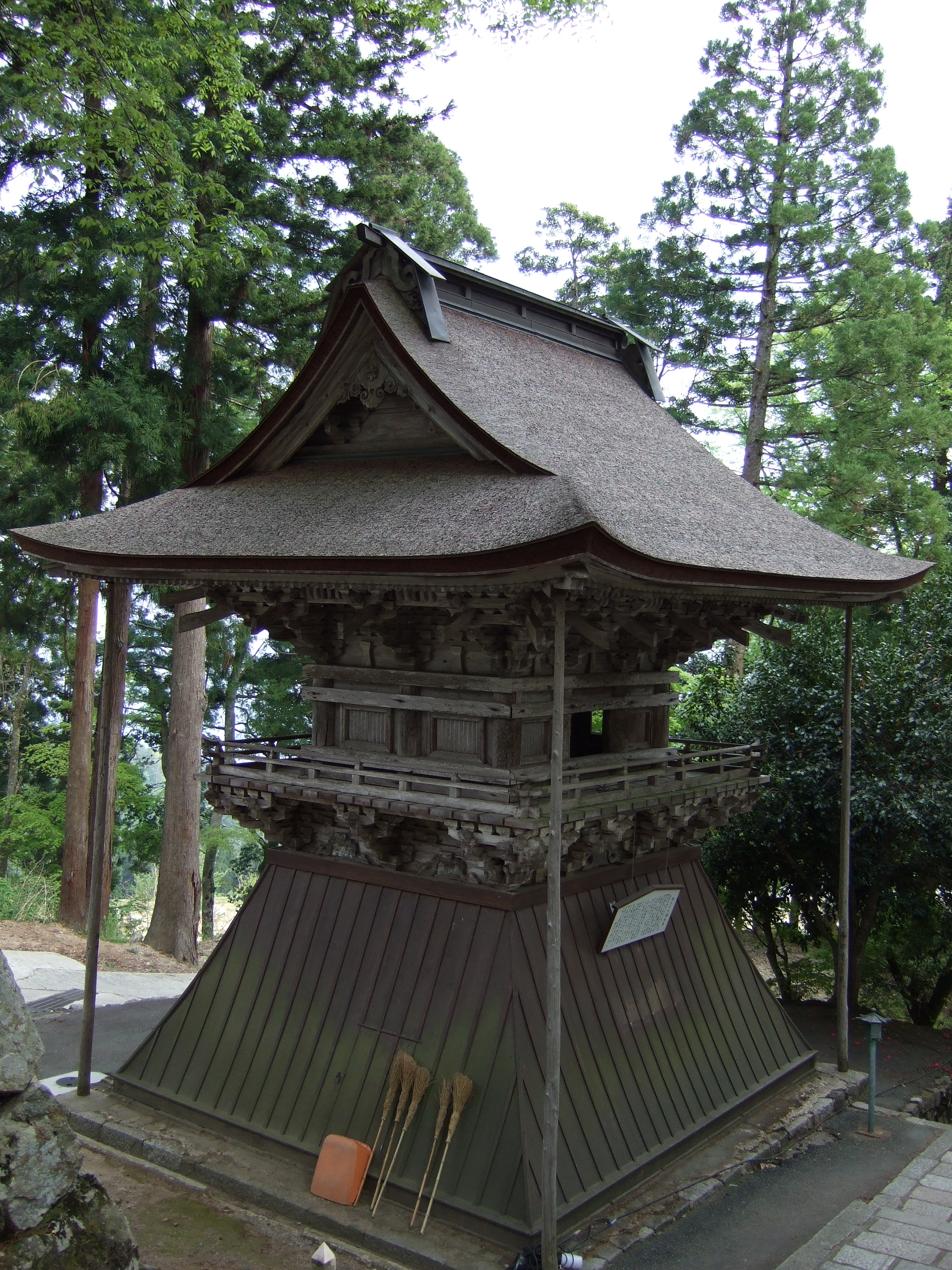
Shōrō

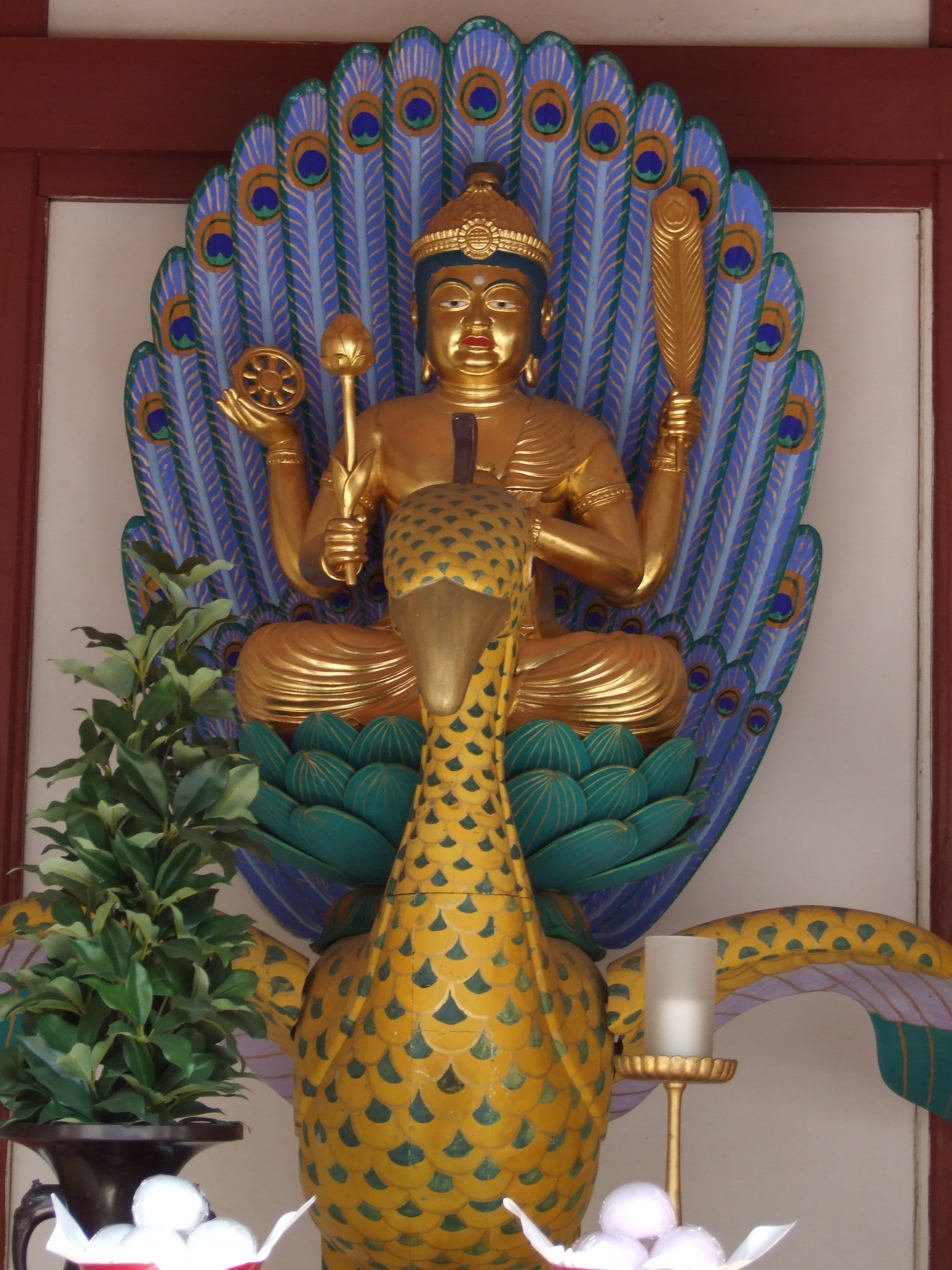
Kujaku Monju

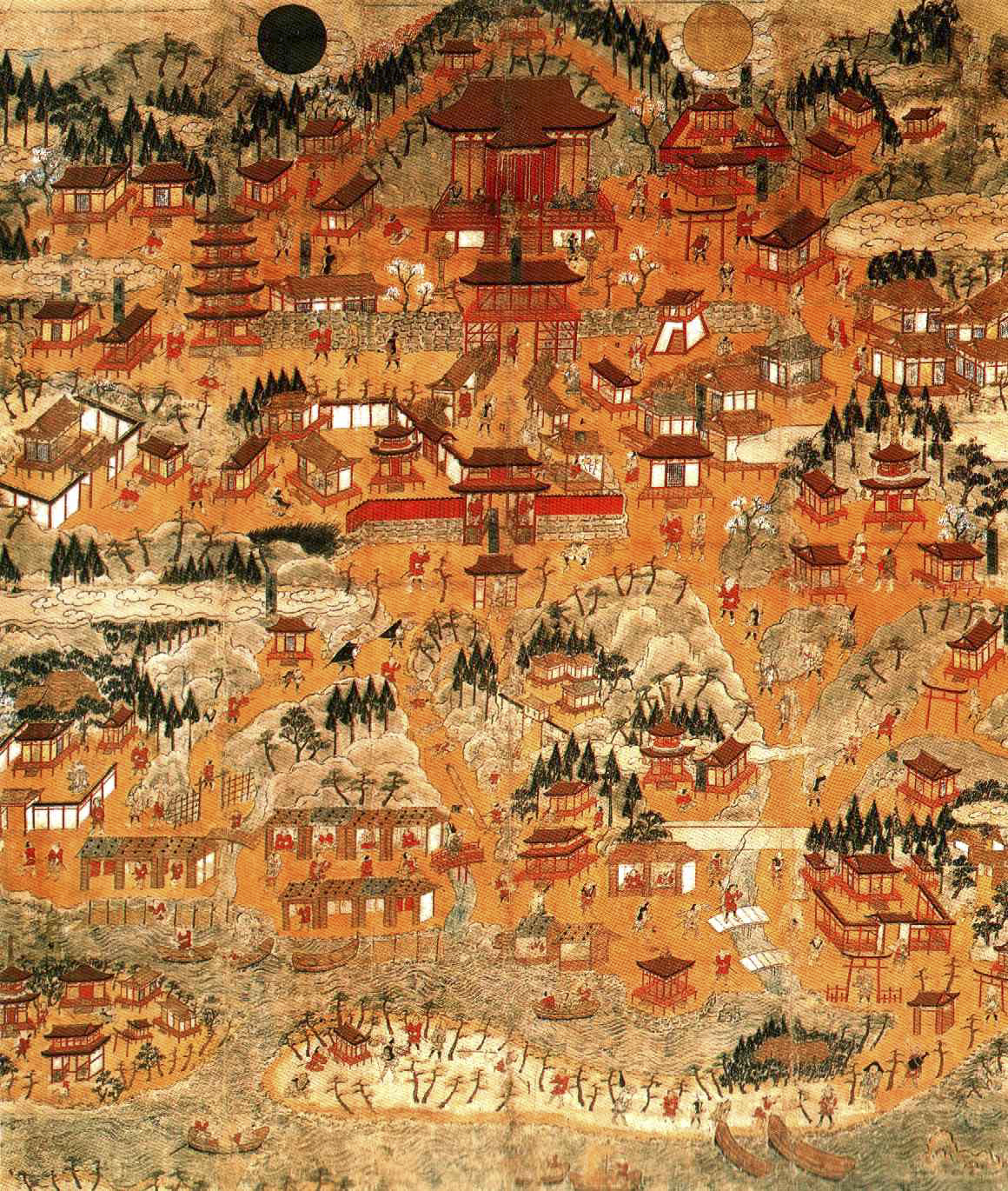
Nariai-ji Sankei Mandala

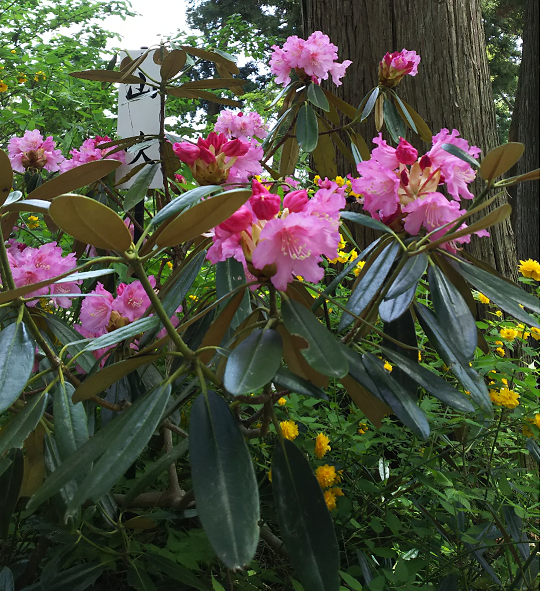
The temple is also famous for its rhododendron flowers

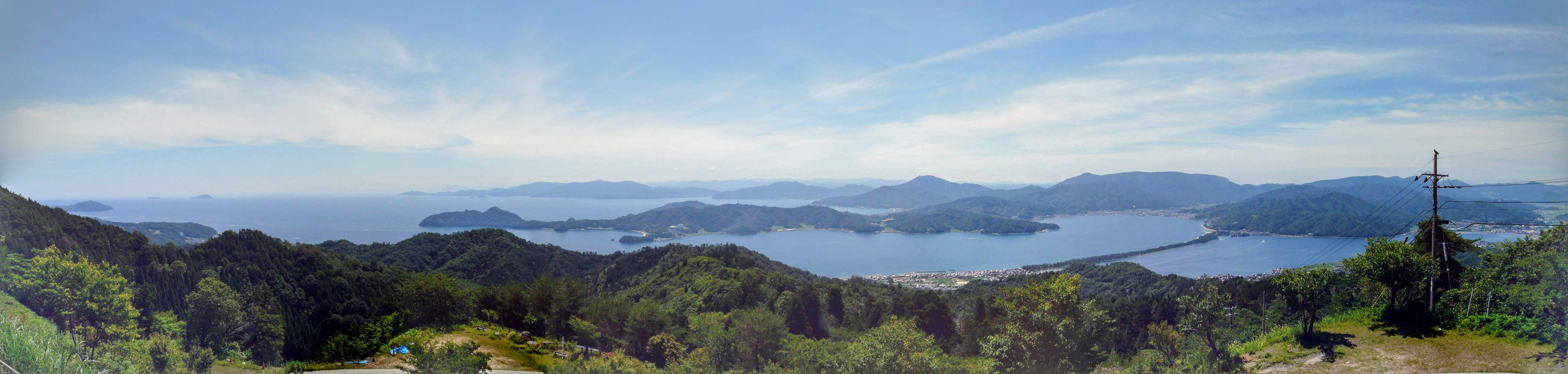
View from the observatory of Nariai-ji

== Access ==
The temple is located approximately 11 kilometers north of Amanohashidate Station on the JR West Miyazu Line.

== Cultural Properties ==
=== National Important Cultural Properties ===
- Colored red glass Amida painting on silk (絹本著色紅玻璃阿弥陀像), Kamakura period
- Catalogue of the total number of fields in the various villages and villages of Tanba Province (丹波国諸庄郷保総田数帳目録). Kamakura period.
- Iron Bathtub (鉄湯船). Kamakura period (1290).

=== Kyoto Prefecture Tangible Cultural Properties ===
- Nariai-ji Pilgrimage Mandala (成相寺参詣曼荼羅), Muromachi period (late 16th century).
- Hondō (本堂 附：棟札 2枚), Edo period.
- Chinju-dō (鎮守堂), Edo period
- Shōrō (鐘楼), Edo period.
- Colored Silk painting Kujaku Monju (孔雀文磬), Muromachi period (1413).
- Lotus Sutra (法華経), Muromachi period (1394); 7 scrolls.
- Large Prajñāpāramitā Sūtra (大般若経), 591 volumes, South Sung, Muromachi, Edo periods (1394).
- Nariai-ji old documents (成相寺文書・制札), 6 boxes; Muromachi - Edo periods (1394).
- Nariai-ji artifacts (成相寺旧境内出土品), 6 boxes; Muromachi - Edo periods (1394).

=== Kyoto Prefecture Registered Tangible Cultural Properties ===
- Gilt-bronze chest (金銅装笈), Muromachi period.

=== Miyazu City Designated Tangible Cultural Properties ===
- Bonshō (梵鐘), Azuchi-Momoyama.

== See also ==
- List of Historic Sites of Japan (Kyoto)
