= Book of Life and Death =

Mythological registry of lifespans in Chinese mythology

- Chinese: 生死簿
- Literal meaning: Registry of Life and Death
Transcriptions
Standard Mandarin
- Hanyu Pinyin: Shēngsǐ Bù
- Wade–Giles: Sheng-ssu Pu

The Book of Life and Death, or Registry of Life and Death (Chinese: 生死簿; pinyin: Shēngsǐ bù) is a mythical registry in Chinese mythology and folk religion that records the lifespans, birth times, and exact times of death for all living beings across the Three Realms. According to legend, it is kept in the Underworld (Diyu) and serves as the absolute authority dictating the cycle of life and death.

== Concept and function ==
In old Chinese stories, the Southern Dipper (南斗) controls birth, while the Northern Dipper (北斗) controls death. Gan Bao's In Search of the Supernatural (搜神記) tells of a young man named Yan Chao (顏超), who was meant to die at the age of nineteen. After he gave food and wine to two men playing chess, one of them changed his written record so that he could live to ninety. The two men were later said to be the Southern and Northern Dipper. The story also gives the saying "The Southern Dipper controls birth, the Northern Dipper controls death" (南斗注生，北斗注死).

In later Chinese stories, the Book of Life and Death (生死簿) is a record kept in the Underworld. It lists people's names and how long they are meant to live. Some stories say it also records the lives of animals. In the Song dynasty book Yijian Zhi (夷堅志), a man named Zheng Lin (鄭鄰) is taken to the Underworld by mistake. A judge checks the Book of Life and Death and finds that he still has years to live. He is then allowed to return home.

In Chinese folk belief, Yanluo Wang and the Judges (Panguan, 判官) are said to look after the records of the dead. The judges check the books and help decide what happens to each soul. Underworld messengers, such as Heibai Wuchang and Ox-Head and Horse-Face, are said to bring the dead before the judges.

The book is often said to decide when a person will die. However, some stories say that its records can be changed. In Journey to the West, Sun Wukong crosses out his name and the names of other monkeys to free them from the Underworld's control. Other stories tell of people whose lives are made longer by changes to the records. Scholar Zhang Zhao notes that Chinese stories show both ideas: a person's time of death may be fixed, but it may also be changed.

== Historical origins ==
In old Chinese beliefs, Heaven was said to decide how long a person would live. Stories from the Song dynasty mention a book that records people's lifespans. In Yijian Zhi (夷堅志) by Hong Mai, a story called The Rebirth of Zheng Lin (鄭鄰再生) tells of a man who is taken to the Underworld by mistake. A judge checks the Book of Life and Death (生死簿) and finds that Zheng Lin still has years to live. He is then allowed to return home.

== In literature ==
The Book of Life and Death appears in the Chinese novel Journey to the West. Sun Wukong is taken to the Underworld, where he meets the Ten Kings of Hell. He demands to see the Book of Life and Death and finds that he is meant to die at the age of 342. Wukong takes a brush and crosses out his own name and all the other names in the monkey register. He then leaves the Underworld. When he returns to his mountain, he tells the monkeys what he has done. The novel says that some of them no longer grow old because their names are no longer in the records.

Later in the novel, Emperor Taizong of Tang is brought to the Underworld. The Ten Kings order a judge named Cui Jue (崔珏) to check how many years the emperor has left to live. The judge finds that Taizong is meant to die in the thirteenth year of his reign. He secretly changes the number from 13 to 33, giving the emperor another twenty years of life. Taizong is then allowed to return to the world of the living.

In the 2005 television series Lotus Lantern (宝莲灯), Liu Chenxiang enters the eighteen levels of Hell to save his father, Liu Yanchang. He fights his way out of the Underworld with his father and frees many other souls. Chenxiang also burns the Books of Life and Death for Liu Family Village (刘家村). As a result, the villagers can no longer die. In one scene, a villager is stabbed with a spear but survives because his name is no longer in the records.

The Book of Life and Death is also called the "Book of Man" (人书) in some modern accounts of Chinese mythology. A later source describes three legendary books: the Book of Heaven (天书), identified with the Fengshen Bang (封神榜) from Investiture of the Gods; the Book of Earth (地书), identified with the Classic of Mountains and Seas; and the Book of Man, identified with the Book of Life and Death. In this account, the three books control the affairs of heaven, earth and human life.

== See also ==
- Diyu (Chinese Underworld)
- Yanluo Wang (King Yama)
- Heibai Wuchang
- Book of Life (Christian equivalent concept)
- Akashic records
