= Chitou =

Chitou is a surname. Notable people with the surname include:

- Rachad Chitou (born 1976), Beninese footballer
- Shafiq Chitou (born 1985), Beninese boxer

== See also ==
- Chitou Furen, a deity in Taoist traditions
- Chitour, an Arabic surname (redirect)
