= Liezi =

Classic book of Chinese philosophy

Chinese name
- Chinese: 列子
- Literal meaning: "[The Writings of] Master Lie"
Transcriptions
Standard Mandarin
- Hanyu Pinyin: Lièzǐ
- Bopomofo: ㄌㄧㄝˋ ㄗˇ
- Gwoyeu Romatzyh: Liehtzyy
- Wade–Giles: Lieh^{4} Tzŭ^{3}
- Yale Romanization: Lyèdž
- IPA: [ljê.tsɹ̩̀]
Yue: Cantonese
- Yale Romanization: Lihtjí
- Jyutping: Lit6zi2
- IPA: [lit̚˨.tsi˧˥]
Southern Min
- Tâi-lô: Lia̍t-tsú
Old Chinese
- Baxter–Sagart (2014): *[r][e]t tsəʔ

Japanese name
- Kanji: 列子
- Kana: れっし
Transcriptions
- Romanization: Resshi

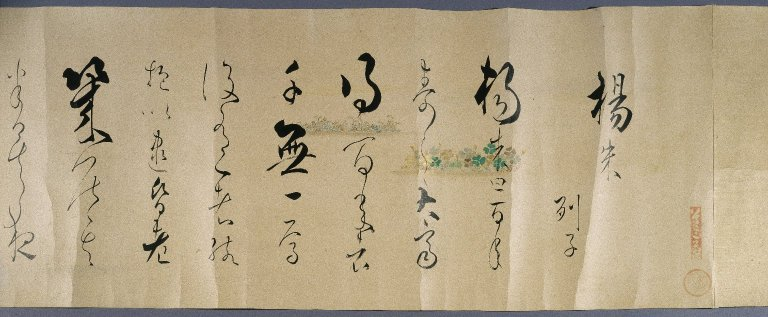
Calligraphy of a segment of the "Yang Zhu" ("Yang-chu") chapter - Kojima Soshin

The Liezi (Chinese: 列子; Wade–Giles: Lieh Tzŭ) is a Taoist text attributed to Lie Yukou, a c. 5th century BC Hundred Schools of Thought philosopher. Although there were references to Lie's Liezi from the 3rd and 2nd centuries BC, a number of Chinese and Western scholars believe that the content of the current text was compiled around the 4th century CE by Zhang Zhan.

== Textual history ==
The first two references to the Liezi book are from the former Han dynasty. The editor Liu Xiang notes he eliminated repetitions in Liezi and rearranged it into eight chapters (pian 篇). The Book of Han bibliography section (藝文志) says it has eight chapters (篇) and concludes that since the Zhuangzi quotes Liezi, he must have lived before Zhuangzi. There is a three-century historical gap until the next evidence of the Liezi: the Jin dynasty commentary by Zhang Zhan 張湛 (fl. ca. 370 CE). Zhang's preface claims his Liezi copy was transmitted down from his grandfather. All received Liezi texts derive from Zhang's version, which is divided into eight chapters (juan 巻).

During the reign of Emperor Xuanzong of Tang, the Liezi was designated a Daoist classic, completing the trilogy with the more famous Tao Te Ching and Zhuangzi, it was honorifically entitled the Chongxu zhenjing (沖虛真經; "True Classic of Simplicity and Vacuity", that is, Classic of the Perfect Emptiness). This "Simplicity and Vacuity" is Wing-tsit Chan's translation; chongxu (literally "soar/young/simple empty/skies/modest") usually means "soar aloft, rise high; carefree, unburdened with ambition". During the later reign of Emperor Zhenzong of Song, the Liezi was further honored as the Chongxu zhide zhenjing (沖虛至德真經; “True Classic of Simplicity and Vacuity and Perfect Virtue”).

== Contents ==
The eight Liezi chapters are shown below (with translations of titles adapted from Graham 1990).

Chapter	Chinese	Pinyin	Translation
1	天瑞	Tian Rui	Heaven's Gifts
2	黃帝	Huang Di	The Yellow Emperor
3	周穆王	Zhou Mu Wang	King Mu of Zhou
4	仲尼	Zhong Ni	Confucius
5	湯問	Tang Wen	The Questions of Tang
6	力命	Li Ming	Endeavor and Destiny
7	楊朱	Yang Zhu	Yang Zhu
8	說符	Shuo Fu	Explaining Conjunctions

Most Liezi chapters are named after famous figures in Chinese mythology and history. Either sage rulers like the Yellow Emperor (supposedly r. 2698?–2599? BCE), King Tang of Shang (r. 1617?–1588? BCE), and King Mu of Zhou (r. 1023?–983? BCE); or philosophers like Confucius (551–479 BCE) and Yang Zhu (fl. ca. 350 BCE).

The Liezi is generally considered to be the most practical of the major Taoist works, compared to the poetic narrative of Laozi and the philosophical writings of Zhuangzi. Although the Liezi has not been extensively published in the West, some passages are well known. For example, Gengsangzi (庚桑子) gives this description of Taoist pure experience:

My body is in accord with my mind, my mind with my energies, my energies with my spirit, my spirit with Nothing. Whenever the minutest existing thing or the faintest sound affects me, whether it is far away beyond the eight borderlands, or close at hand between my eyebrows and eyelashes, I am bound to know it. However, I do not know whether I perceived it with the seven holes in my head and my four limbs, or knew it through my heart and belly and internal organs. It is simply self-knowledge.

Compare the Zhuangzi saying, "The Perfect Man uses his mind like a mirror—going after nothing, welcoming nothing, responding but not storing. Therefore he can win out over things and not hurt himself."

== Authenticity ==
Liezi scholars have long recognized that it shares many passages with other pre-Han texts like the Zhuangzi, Daodejing, and Lüshi Chunqiu. Barrett says opinion is "divided as to whether it is an ancient work with later interpolations or a forgery confected from ancient sources." On the one hand, the Liezi could contain a core of c. 400 BCE authentic writings of Lie Yukou; on the other hand, it could be a c. 400 CE compilation forged by Zhang Zhan.

The Liezi is most similar to the Zhuangzi. They share many characters and stories; Graham lists sixteen complete episodes plus sections from others. The Zhuangzi also mentions Liezi in four chapters and Lie Yukou in three, for example, the famous passage about Liezi's ability to ride the wind and go flying around in chapter 1.

The final two chapters have heterogeneous contents that differ from the Daoism elsewhere in the book. Chapter 7 records the Yangism philosophy of "Yang Zhu" (Yangzi), infamous for the criticism of Mencius that he, "believed in 'every man for himself.' If he could have helped the whole world by plucking out a single hair, he would not have done it." Zhang Zhan speculates that this chapter, focusing on indulgence in physical and temporary pleasures, was from Lie Yukou's earlier years in Yangism, before he became a Daoist. The well-known scholar of Chinese philosophy, Wing-Tsit Chan calls the "Yang Zhu" chapter "negative Daoism" in contrast with the Daoism of Laozi, Zhuangzi, and Huainanzi that were "all positive in that each represents something new." Chapter 8, "Explaining Conjunctions," is primarily taken from other early sources, not only Daoist but Confucian and Mohist texts, two philosophies that opposed the philosophical Daoism this book expounds.

A. C. Graham, Professor Emeritus of the School of Oriental and African Studies, illuminated the textual provenance. After his translation of Liezi in 1960, which Barrett calls undoubtedly "the best translation into a Western language to date", Graham linguistically analyzed internal evidence and textual parallels. He discovered many cases where the Liezi is clearly secondary to other texts, but none where it is the primary source for a passage. The Preface to the revised Liezi translation explains his significant change in attitude.

Although in 1960 most scholars in China already recognized the late date of [Liezi], most Westerners were still disinclined to question its antiquity. My own textual studies, not yet completed when this translation first appeared, supported the Chinese dating, which by now prevails also in the West. … One result of the textual investigation came as a surprise to me. The present book describes the hedonist 'Yang [Zhu]' chapter as 'so unlike the rest of [Liezi] that it must be from another hand … The thought is certainly very different, and it does show the signs of editing and interpolation by the Taoist author … But although close scrutiny generally reveals marked differences in style between the body of the book and passages borrowed from earlier sources, I could find none to distinguish the hedonist chapter from the rest.

Owing to occasional Liezi textual misunderstandings in Zhang Zhan's commentary, Graham concludes that the "guiding hand" probably belonged to Zhang's father or grandfather, which would mean c. 300 CE.

Suggestions of Buddhist influences in Liezi chapters 3 and 6 are potentially corroborating evidence for a late date of composition; see Buddhism in China. "King Mu of Zhou" discusses sense perceptions as illusions; "Endeavor and Destiny" takes a fatalistic (if not karmic) view of destiny, which goes against the traditional Daoist concept of Wuwei.

== Influence ==
Liezi is known as one of the three most important texts in Taoism, together with the Tao Te Ching and Zhuangzi. Outside of Taoism, the biji genre story Yi Jian Zhi by Hong Mai borrowed the character of Yi Jian, a contemporary of the ancient mythical emperor Yu, from Liezi.

== Translations ==
There are fewer English translations of the Liezi than other Taoist texts. The first were partial versions; Lionel Giles (1912) translated chapters 1–6 and 8, while Anton Forke (1912) covered chapter 7 ("Yang Zhu"). As mentioned above, A. C. Graham (1960, 1990) wrote a definitive scholarly translation. A recent Liezi rendition is a creative translation by Eva Wong (2001). In 2005, the Library of Chinese Classics published a translation by Liang Xiaopeng. In 2011, Thomas Cleary self-published a translation titled The Book of Master Lie.

== See also ==
- Daodejing
- Zhuangzi
- Wenzi
- Four Books
