= Nieh-ching-t'ai =

Mirror in Chinese mythology

In Chinese mythology, Nieh-ching-t'ai (simplified Chinese: 孽镜台; traditional Chinese: 孽鏡臺; pinyin: niè jìngtái; lit. 'evil mirror platform') is a mirror in Diyu, the Chinese underworld. It is also known as the Mirror of the Wicked, the Mirror of Retribution, and the Mirror of Past Existences.

== Description ==
Souls are forced to stand in front of it and see their true selves, namely the events of their previous existences. The Yama King then makes his judgment.

It stands in the Court of the First Yama King and faces to the east, on a raised stand eleven feet in height. The mirror has a circumference of six feet.
