= Wenzi =

Ancient Chinese Daoist text

The Wenzi (Chinese: 文子; pinyin: Wénzǐ; Wade–Giles: Wen-tzŭ; lit. '[Book of] Master Wen') is a Daoist classic allegedly written by a disciple of Laozi. The text was widely read and highly revered in the centuries following its creation, and even canonized as Tongxuan zhenjing (Chinese: 通玄真經; pinyin: Tōngxuán zhēnjīng; Wade–Giles: T‘ung-hsüan chên-ching; lit. 'True Scripture of Understanding the Mysteries') in the year 742 CE. However, soon afterwards scholars started questioning its authenticity and dismissing it as a forgery that was created between the Han dynasty and the Tang dynasty. The text's fate changed in 1973, when archeologists excavated a 55 BCE tomb and discovered remnants of a Wenzi copied on bamboo strips, offering a glimpse of what the text looked like prior its drastic revision into the current text.

== Author ==
Pages from a Ming dynasty printed edition of Wenzi

The title Wenzi (文子; 子 (zi) in this context meaning "master") is analogous with other Hundred Schools of Thought texts like Mozi, Zhuangzi, Guiguzi, and Baopuzi. Wen (meaning among other things "literature" or "culture") is a Chinese surname, and hence "Wenzi" is interpretable as "Master Wen." Wen is also frequently used in given names, posthumous names, et cetera, due to its positive connotations. For example, King Wen of Zhou (Analects 5.15). Hence, "Wenzi" could also be interpreted as a nom de plume denoting "Master of Literature/Culture." Nothing can be said for certain about the identity of Wenzi, no matter how this name is interpreted. Although we do not know his true identity, various hypotheses have been proposed.

The bibliographical section of the 1st century CE Book of Han says Wenzi was a student of Laozi, a contemporary of Confucius (551-479 BCE), and an adviser to King Ping of Zhou (r. 770-720 BCE). This cannot be true, as King Ping and Confucius lived two centuries apart, and it fueled suspicion of the text's forged status in later centuries. To solve the chronological inconsistency, some commentators suggest a mistake for King Ping of Chu (r. 528-516 BCE), whose reign does coincide with Confucius' lifetime.

The early Wenzi commentary by Li Xian (李暹; fl. 516 CE) records that Wenzi's surname was Xin (辛) and his sobriquet (號; hao) was Jiran (計然,) he served under Fan Li, and studied with Laozi.

The later Wenzi commentary by Du Daojian (1237-1318) furthermore notes Wenzi was a nobleman from the Spring and Autumn period state of Jin, his surname was Xin (辛) and courtesy name was Xing (銒). He was also called Song Xing (宋銒) referring to his home of Kuiqiu (葵丘), which was in the state of Song.

== Received Text ==
Written references to the Wenzi first appear in the Han dynasty. The no longer extant 1st century BCE Qilue (七略; "Seven Summaries") by Liu Xiang and Liu Xin said the Wenzi had 9 pian (篇; "chapters"). The bibliographical section of the 1st century CE Book of Han records the Wenzi text in 9 juan (卷; "rolls; volumes"), says Wenzi was a student of Laozi, a contemporary of Confucius (551-479 BCE), and adviser to King Ping of Zhou (r. 770-720 BCE), but adds "the work appears to be a forgery", presumably because King Ping and Confucius lived two centuries apart.

In his ca. 523 CE Qilu (七錄; "Seven Records"), the Liang dynasty scholar Ruan Xiaoxu (阮孝緒) records the Wenzi text in 10 volumes. Bibliographies in the 636 CE Book of Sui and the 945 CE New Book of Tang both record 12 volumes.

In 742 CE, Emperor Xuanzong of Tang canonized the Wenzi as a Daoist scripture (along with the Tao Te Ching, Zhuangzi, and Liezi) honorifically called the Tongxuan zhenjing (通玄真經; "True Scripture of Understanding the Mysteries"). The emperor posthumously styled Wenzi as the Tongxuan Zhenren (通玄真人; "True Man Who Understands the Mysteries").

The Daozang "Daoist Canon" includes three Wenzi redactions under the Yujue (玉訣; "Commentaries") subsection of the Dongshen (洞神; "Spirit Grotto") section. The oldest extant edition is the Tongxuan zhenjing zhu (通玄真經注; "Commentary on the Authentic Scripture of Pervading Mystery") by Xu Lingfu (徐靈府; ca. 760–841) of the Tang dynasty. The Tongxuan zhenjing zhengyi zhu (通玄真經正儀注; "Commentary on the Correct Meaning of the Authentic Scripture of Pervading Mystery") is by Zhu Bian of the Song dynasty. Third is the 1310 CE Tongxuan zhenjing zuanyi (通玄真經纘義; "Collected Explanations to the Authentic Scripture of Pervading Mystery") by Du Daojian (杜道堅; 1237–1318) of the Yuan dynasty. Judith M. Boltz cites the opinion of Complete Library of the Four Treasuries bibliographers that Du's version was the most reliable Wenzi redaction. She notes that Du Daojian became the rightful literary heir to Wenzi when he discovered a copy of the classic at the Tongxuan Guan (通玄觀; "Abbey of Pervading Mystery") of Mount Jizhou (計籌) in Zhejiang, where hagiographic legend says Wenzi took refuge and wrote down his teachings.

== Content ==
Although the Wenzi has traditionally been considered a Daoist text illustrating Laozi's thinking, it contains elements from Confucianism, Mohism, Legalism, and School of Names. The textual format records Laozi answering Wenzi's questions about Tao Te Ching concepts like wu wei. Besides citing passages from Daoist classics like Zhuangzi and Huainanzi, the Wenzi also cites others like the I Ching, Mencius, Lüshi Chunqiu, and Xiao Jing. Regarding the received Wenzi text, Yoshinobu Sakade concludes:

While these references make the Wenzi appear as a source of ancient thought, in the form we know it today it is a forgery, with about eighty percent of the text quoted from the Huainan zi, and the rest consisting of an amplification of the Tao Te Ching or quotations from other texts. The present version contains expression similar to those found in the Taoist scriptures … These elements suffice to show that the extant Wenzi was written between the third and eight centuries, before the time of Xu Lingfu.

== Excavated text ==
In 1973, Chinese archeologists excavated a Han dynasty tomb near Dingzhou in Hebei. Its occupant is identified as King Huai (懷王) of Zhongshan, who died in 55 BCE. Tomb furnishings included a precious Jade burial suit, jade ornaments, writing tools, and remnants of eight Chinese classic texts, including the Wenzi and Confucian Analects copied on hundreds of bamboo slips. These bamboo manuscripts were fragmented, disordered, and blackened by fire, perhaps accidentally caused by tomb robbers.

The specialized project of deciphering and transcribing this ancient Wenzi copy was delayed owing to a 1976 earthquake at Tangshan that further damaged the Dingzhou bamboo slips. The team published their first report in 1981 and their Wenzi transcription in 1995 (both in the archeological journal 文物; Wenwu; "Cultural Relics").

Ongoing sinological studies of the so-called Dingzhou Wenzi are providing both specific details of the presumed urtext edition and general insights in the early history of Daoist texts. Portions of the Dingzhou Wenzi are basically consistent with certain section in chapter 5 of the received text. Consensus is building that this excavated Wenzi dates from the 2nd century BCE, while the transmitted text was created after the 2nd century CE.

The question-and-answer format is a significant difference between the bamboo and received Wenzi versions. Ames and Rosemont explain:

Consistent with the court bibliography in the History of the Han, the Dingzhou Wenzi has Wenzi as teacher who is being asked questions by a King Ping of the Zhou. The received text, on the other hand, has the teacher Laozi being asked questions by the student Wenzi, certainly less appropriate given that texts are usually named for the teacher rather than the student.

== Translations ==
Compared with the numerous English translations of familiar Daoist texts like the Tao Te Ching and Zhuangzi, the presumably apocryphal Wenzi has been disregarded. Thomas Cleary wrote a popularized translation of the transmitted Wenzi. There is no authoritative English Wenzi translation based on the groundbreaking Dingzhou readings, nothing comparable with the Analects translation by Ames and Rosemont. English translations of select Dingzhou Wenzi bamboo strips can be found in the monograph by Paul van Els.

== Early scholarship ==
Although the Wenzi was historically denounced as a forgery, Herrlee G. Creel believed it was "important to the history of Taoist thought" even before the 1973 Hebei tomb discovery, taking it as having an interpretation of the text similar to that of the Han Feizi and J.J.L. Duyvendak. Translator Thomas Cleary (1991) promoted it as "covering the whole range of classical Taoist thought and practice", following the traditions of Laozi, Zhuangzi and the Huainan Masters.

== See also ==
- Tao Te Ching
- Zhuangzi
- Liezi
- Four Books
