= Journeys to the Under-World =

1978 Taiwanese novel by Yang Zanru

- Cover of the English version
- Author: Yangsheng (楊生)
- Language: Chinese
- Genre: Supernatural, horror
- Publication date: 1976
- Publication place: Taiwan
- Media type: Print (Paperback)

Journeys to The Under-World (traditional Chinese: 地獄遊記; simplified Chinese: 地狱游记; pinyin: Dìyù Yóujì), also known as Voyages to Hell, is a Taiwanese novel describing what Yangsheng (楊生), a planchette handler, saw and heard when he followed his master Ji Gong to hell on the instruction of the Jade Emperor. The story is about the consequences resulting from actions during the life of a person. It contains journeys made by Ji Gong and Yangsheng to each level in hell to warn those in the living world with an evil heart. Each chapter contains detailed descriptions of their observations and interviews with souls being punished in hell.

== Author ==
The author is a Taiwanese writer, Yang Zanru (simplified Chinese: 杨赞儒; traditional Chinese: 楊贊儒; pinyin: Yáng Zànrú; born 1951), who refers to himself as "Yangsheng" (simplified Chinese: 杨生; traditional Chinese: 楊生; pinyin: Yángshēng) in the book. He became a Buddhist monk in 1997 and adopted the Buddhist name "Shenglun" (simplified Chinese: 圣轮; traditional Chinese: 聖輪; pinyin: Shènglún).

== Production ==
According to the author, the production of these accounts were painstakingly achieved by the use of fuji (planchette writing) with Ji Gong as the guide and Yangsheng as the medium. The details and conversations of each journey were written in Chinese characters on the planchette board during each fuji session, which was a very tedious and time-consuming process. The visits were generally made at night. Collection of material for the book started in 1976 at Sheng-hsien Tang (聖賢堂) in Taichung, Taiwan. The project was completed and published in Chinese in 1978.

== See also ==
- Jade Record
- Chinese spiritual world concepts
- Inferno (Dante)
