= Chitour =

Chitour is an Arabic surname.

Notable people with the surname include:

- Chems-Eddine Chitour (1944–2026), Algerian scholar, researcher, author, and politician
- Fadhila Chitour (born 1942), Algerian professor and human rights activist
