= Chitou Furen =

Chinese deity

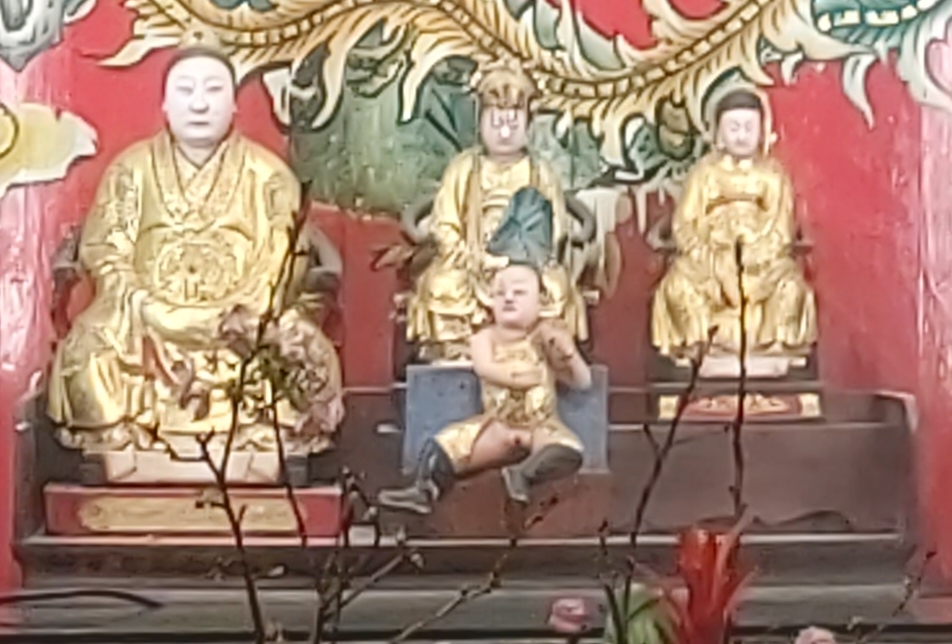
Statues of Lady Chitou (center), Lady Dadu (left), and Lady Zhu (right) enshrined in the rear hall of Longshan Temple.

Chitou Furen (池头夫人, lit. "Lady of the Pool" or "Madam Pond") is a deity in Taoist traditions. She is mainly worshipped at Longshan Temple and Dalongdong Baoan Temple, with its origins closely tied to the history of Longshan Temple and the conflicts, such as the Zhangquan-Hakka conflict or Dingxia village skirmishes, that occurred in the Mengkia area during the Qing Dynasty in Taiwan. This deity is often enshrined alongside other deities, such as Zhusheng Niangniang (the Goddess of Childbirth), Ksitigarbha (Dizang Wang), or City Gods.

== Legend ==
According to Yuli Baozhuan (Jade Record, 玉历宝钞), which records that Chitou Furen is a deity under the command of Fengdu Dadi who is in charge of the "Blood Pool Hell" (血池地狱). Therefore, the surviving family members of women who died in childbirth would also worship Lady of the Pool, praying that their deceased relatives would be spared suffering in the Blood Pool.

According to the temple's introduction, in the seventh month of 1854 AD (the fourth year of the Xianfeng reign of the Qing Dynasty), it is said that during a period of conflict, Zhangzhou immigrants attempted a night attack on Quanzhou immigrants. A pregnant woman resting by the temple's wishing pool discovered their plan. This woman was killed by the Zhangzhou people to silence her, but the commotion alerted the Quanzhou immigrants, giving them time to prepare for battle and ultimately successfully protect their homes and fields. Because this pregnant woman sacrificed herself during the conflict, the Quanzhou immigrants who managed the affairs of Mengjia Longshan Temple and Dalongdong Baoan Temple erected a statue of her in the rear hall to commemorate her virtue, honoring her with the title "Lady of the Pool" (池头夫人) and venerating her as a deity who protects women's safe childbirth.
