= Jade Record =

Chinese illustrated religious tract

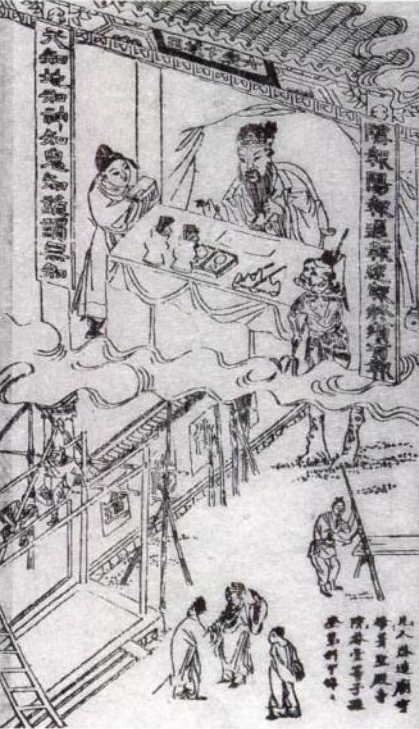
Illustration from the Jade Record: underworld king Biang-cheng sitting at his desk and ruling over the sixth level of hell. An assistant in scholar's clothes presents the sinner's record; a demon is set to supervise the punishment.

The Jade Record or Yuli (玉曆), also known as The Jade Almanacs, is an illustrated religious tract that circulated in various versions and editions in the 19th century in China. It has some folk-Buddhist and Daoist features and describes the horrors of Diyu (hell in Chinese mythology) that await bad people.

The prologue states that the tract was submitted to the Jade Emperor or Highest God by the king of hell Yan Luo and the Bodhisattva of Compassion. It was then passed down to a Buddhist priest and later to a Taoist during the Song Dynasty.

The tract describes how the dead pass through the ten courts of hell and are punished with terrible torture according to their misdeeds during life. In the first hall, the "Mirror of Reflection" lets the dead see their own sins. Sins specifically mentioned include: mocking or disbelieving the tract itself, taking one's life without good reason, having weak faith in the Buddha, being careless as a Buddhist or Taoist priest, killing live creatures, stealing, cheating, gambling, drinking, drowning baby girls, killing slaves etc. Yan Luo himself rules over the fifth court of hell; the Highest God demoted him from the first court because he proved too compassionate towards murder victims, allowing them to return to the world for another life. Yan Luo also built a "Tower to View the World", from which the dead can observe how their relatives curse their memory and fight over their possessions. At the end of their passage through hell, the souls are made to forget their previous lives in the goddess Meng's "Tower of Forgetting" and are sent back to the world, reincarnated as animals; poor, ill or ugly humans; or as rich men, depending on their prior behavior.

The Qing emperors tried to suppress the tracts, as Confucianism, the state religion, discouraged any speculation about the afterlife. Hong Xiuquan, the quasi-Christian leader of the Taiping Rebellion, forbade the tracts once he had risen to power.

The Jade Record also contains a calendar, devoting the first day of the first lunar month to the Maitreya Buddha, the eighth day to Yan Luo and the ninth to the Jade Emperor. The Sakyamuni Buddha, the Boddhisattva of Compassion, and the Kitchen God receive two days each. Numerous other gods also receive their special day.

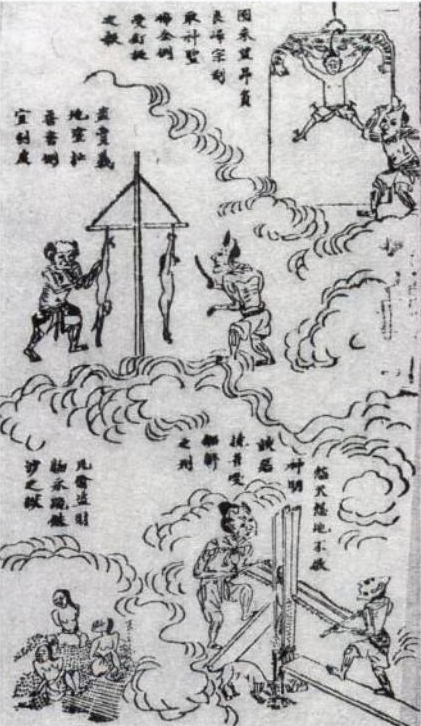
Sinners are being tortured in the sixth court of hell by hammering metal spikes into the body; skinning alive; sawing in half and having to kneel on metal filings.

== See also ==
- Journeys to the Under-World
