= Diyu =

Realm of the dead or "hell" in Chinese mythology

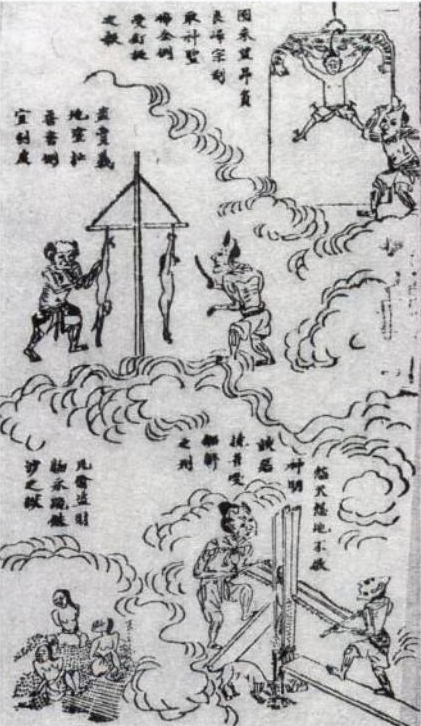
- Illustration from the Jade Record: Tortures being meted out in the Sixth Court of Hell

Chinese name
- Traditional Chinese: 地獄
- Simplified Chinese: 地狱
Transcriptions
Standard Mandarin
- Hanyu Pinyin: dìyù
- IPA: [tî ŷ]

Burmese name
- Burmese: ငရဲ Nga Yè

Tibetan name
- Tibetan: དམྱལ་བ་
Transcriptions
- Wylie: Dmyal Ba

Vietnamese name
- Vietnamese alphabet: Địa ngục
- Chữ Hán: 地獄

Thai name
- Thai: นรก
- RTGS: Nárók

Korean name
- Hangul: 지옥
- Hanja: 地獄
Transcriptions
- Revised Romanization: Jiok
- McCune–Reischauer: Chiok

Mongolian name
- Mongolian Cyrillic: Там (Tam)
- Mongolian script: ᠲᠠᠮ
Transcriptions
- SASM/GNC: Tam

Japanese name
- Kanji: 地獄
Transcriptions
- Romanization: Jigoku

Malay name
- Malay: Neraka

Lao name
- Lao: ນະຮົກ; Na Hok

Khmer name
- Khmer: នរក ("Nɔrʊək")

Sinhalese name
- Sinhalese: නිරය nỉaya

Diyu (traditional Chinese: 地獄; simplified Chinese: 地狱; pinyin: dìyù; lit. 'earth prison') is the realm of the dead or "hell" in Chinese mythology. It is loosely based on a combination of the Buddhist concept of Naraka, traditional Chinese beliefs about the afterlife, and a variety of popular expansions and reinterpretations of these two traditions. The concept parallels purgatory in certain Christian denominations.

Diyu is typically depicted as a subterranean maze with various levels and chambers, to which souls are taken after death to atone for the sins they committed when they were alive. The exact number of levels in Diyu and their associated deities differ between Buddhist and Taoist interpretations. Some speak of three to four "courts"; others mention "Ten Courts of Hell", each of which is ruled by a judge (collectively known as the Ten Yama Kings); other Chinese legends speak of the "Eighteen Levels of Hell". Each court deals with a different aspect of atonement and different punishments; most legends claim that sinners are subjected to gruesome tortures until their "deaths", after which they are restored to their original state for the torture to be repeated.

== Alternative names ==
Among the more common Chinese names for the Underworld are:
- Difu (Chinese: 地府; pinyin: Dìfǔ; Wade–Giles: Ti^{4}-fu^{3}), "Earth Mansion".
- Huangquan (黄泉; 黃泉; Huángquán; Huang^{2}-ch'üan^{2}), "Yellow Springs".
- Yinjian (阴间; 陰間; Yīnjiān; Yin^{1}-chien^{1}; 'Yin dimension'), "Land of Shade".
- Yinfu (阴府; 陰府; Yīnfǔ; Yin^{1}-fu^{3}), "Shady Mansion".
- Yinsi (阴司; 陰司; Yīnsī; Yin^{1}-szu^{1}), "Shady Office".
- Senluo Dian (森罗殿; 森羅殿; Sēnluódiàn; Sen^{1}-lo^{2} Tien^{4}), "Court of Senluo".
- Yanluo Dian (阎罗殿; 閻羅殿; Yánluódiàn; Yan^{2}-lo^{2} Tien^{4}), "Court of Yanluo".
- Jiuquan (九泉; Jiǔquán; Chiu^{3}-ch'üan^{2}), "Nine Springs".
- Zhongquan (重泉; Zhòngquán; Chung^{4}-ch'üan^{2}), "Heavy Spring".
- Quanlu (泉路; Quánlù; Ch'üan^{2}-lu^{4}), "Road to the Spring".
- Youming (幽冥; Yōumíng; Yu^{1}-ming^{2}), "Serene Darkness".
- Yourang (幽壤; Yōurǎng; Yu^{1}-jang^{3}), "Serene Land".
- Huokang (火炕; Huǒkàng; Huo^{3}-kang^{4}), "Fire Pit".
- Jiuyou (九幽; Jiǔyōu; Chiu^{3}-yu^{1}), "Nine Serenities".
- Jiuyuan (九原; Jiǔyuán; Chiu^{3}-yüan^{2}), "Nine Origins".
- Mingfu (冥府; Míngfǔ; Ming^{2}-fu^{3}), "Dark Mansion".
- Mingjie (冥界; Míngjiè; Ming^{2}-chieh^{4}), "Dark Realm", "Underworld".
- Kujing (苦境; Kǔjìng; K`u^{3}-ching^{4}), "Dire Straits", "(Place of) Grievance".
- Abi (阿鼻; Ābí; A^{1}-pi^{2}), "Avīci", the hell of uninterrupted torture, last and deepest of the Eight Hot Narakas.
- Zugen (足跟; Zúgēn; Tsu^{2}-ken^{1}), "Heel".
- Fengdu Cheng (丰都城; 酆都城; Fēngdū Chéng; Feng^{1}-tu^{1} Ch'eng^{2}), a reference to the Fengdu Ghost City.

== Conceptions ==
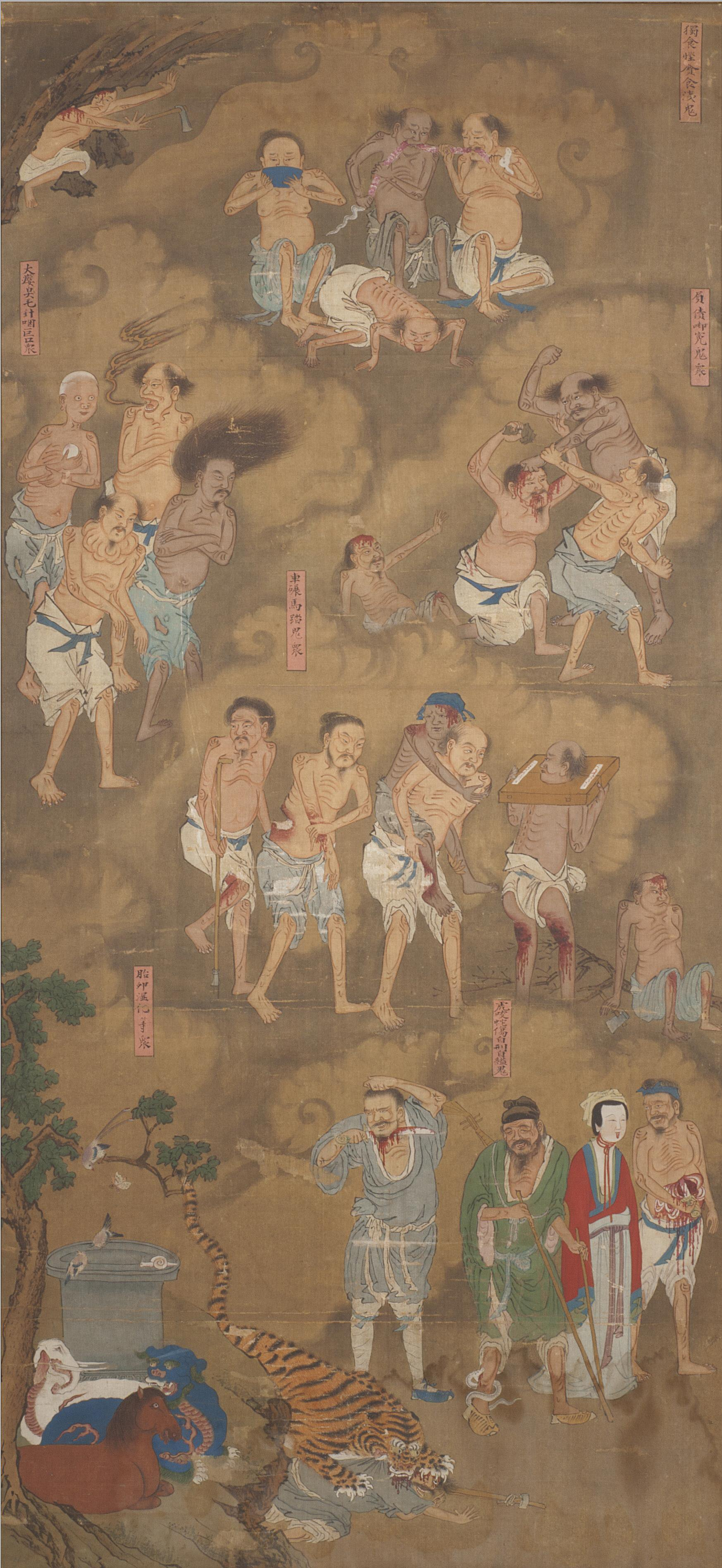
Dead of the underworld depicted in a Qing dynasty Shuilu ritual painting.

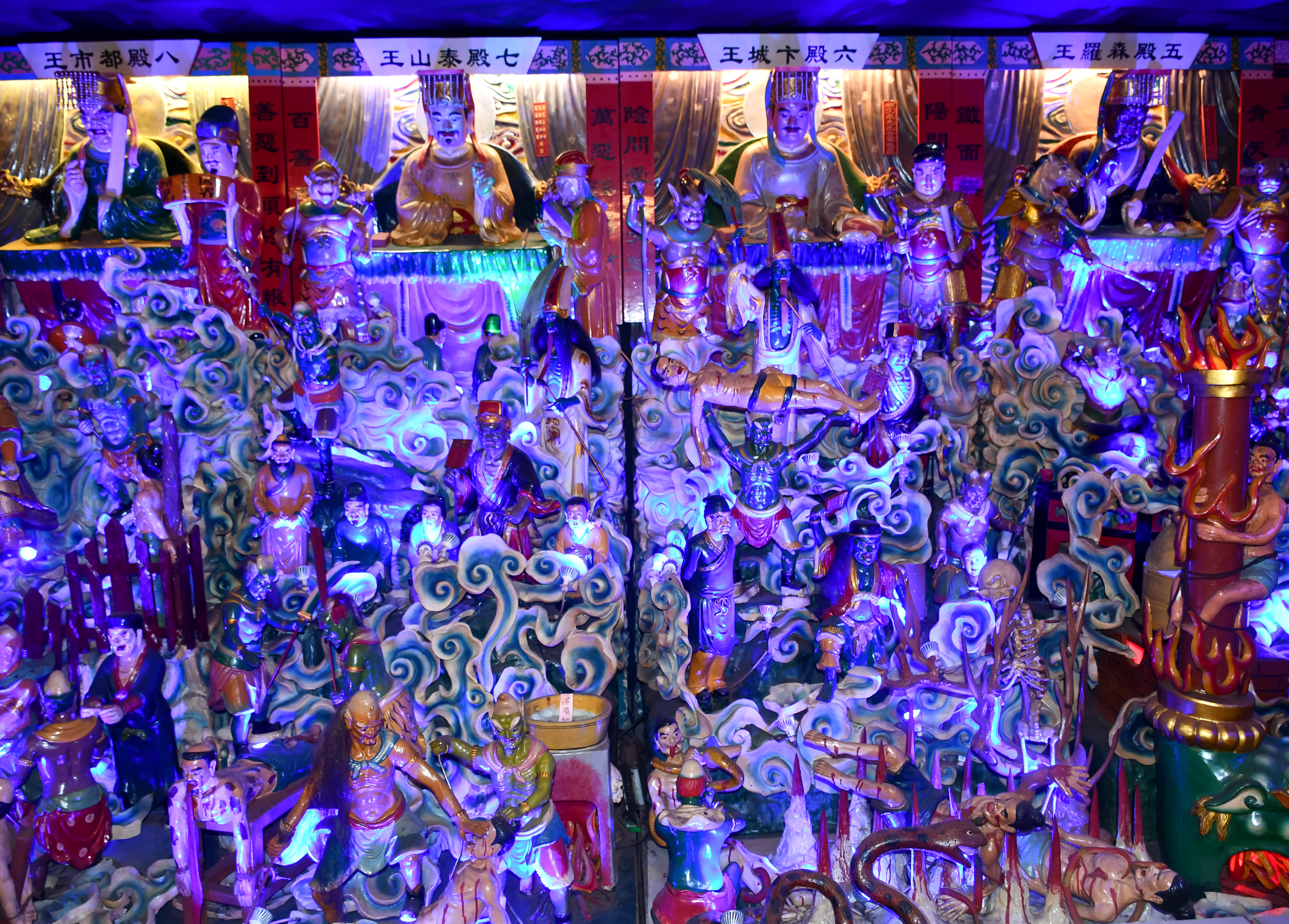
Depiction of the punishments of Diyu at the Hell Museum, Bao Gong Temple, Singapore.

According to ideas from Taoism, Buddhism and traditional Chinese folk religion, Diyu is a purgatory that serves to punish and renew spirits in preparation for reincarnation. Many deities, whose names and purposes are the subject of conflicting accounts, are associated with Diyu.

Some early Chinese societies speak of people going to Mount Tai, Jiuyuan, Jiuquan or Fengdu after death. At present, Fengdu and the temples on Mount Tai have been rebuilt into tourist attractions, incorporating artistic depictions of hell and the afterlife. Some Chinese folk religion planchette writings, such as the Taiwanese novel Journeys to the Under-World, say that new hells with new punishments (for instance, punishments for sins involving reckless driving) or existing hells with modernized punishments (such as the "Hand-searing Hell" (烙手指小地獄) initially used clothes irons to sear the hands of sinners, but now modernized their punishment by searing the sinners' hands on iron rails tied with springs) are created as the world changes, the presence of Centre for Making-up of Recitations (補經所) to house priests, monks and taoists who recite scriptures in exchange for material returns but reciting the wrong punctuation or skipped certain scriptures, and that there is a City of Innocent Deaths (枉死城) designed to house those who died with grievances that have yet to be redressed, such as suicidal, accidental and abortion deaths. Sinners were also sentenced to Diyu regardless of their religion, including Christians.

Other terminology related to Diyu includes:

- Naihe Bridge (奈何桥; 奈何橋; Nàihé Qiáo; Nai^{4}-ho^{2} Ch'iao^{2}), "Bridge of Helplessness", a bridge every soul has to cross before being reincarnated, they are said to drink the Mengpo soup (孟婆汤) at Naihe Qiao so they will forget everything in their current lives and prepare for reincarnation.
- Wang Xiang Tai (望乡台; 望鄉臺; Wàng Xiāng Tái; Wang^{4} Hsiang^{1} T'ai^{2}), "Home-Viewing Pavilion", a pavilion every soul passes by on his/her journey to the Underworld. From there, they can see their families and loved ones in the world of the living.
- Youdu (幽都; Yōu Dū; You^{1}-du^{1}), the capital city of Diyu, generally conceived as being similar to a typical Chinese capital city, such as Chang'an, but surrounded by and pervaded with darkness.
- Youguo (油锅; 油鍋; Yóu Guō; You^{2}-kuo^{1}), "Oil Cauldron", one of the tortures in hell, generally purposed to punish black magic practitioners, murder, corruption, and robbery.
- Santu (三涂; 三塗; Sān Tú; San^{1}-t'u^{2}), the "Three Tortures": Fire Torture (火涂; 火塗; Huǒ Tú; Huo^{3}-t'u^{2}), Blade Torture (刀涂; 刀塗; Dāo Tú; Tao^{1}-t'u^{2}), Blood Torture (血涂; 血塗; Xuě Tú; Hsüeh^{3}-t'u^{2}; 'spilling of blood').

== Ten Courts of Yanluo ==
The concept of the "Ten Courts of Yanluo" (十殿閻羅) began after Chinese folk religion was influenced by Buddhism. In this variation of Chinese mythology, there are 12,800 hells located under the earth – eight dark hells, eight cold hells and 84,000 miscellaneous hells located at the edge of the universe. All will go to Diyu after death but the period of time one spends in Diyu is not forever – it depends on the severity of the sins one committed (grave sins such as unfilial acts, rape, and debauchery will be sentenced to Avīci forever instead, while sinners involved in pornographic materials production will be sent to various hells and finally to Avīci until all such materials ceased to exist). Prior to be sent to various courts, all will be faced in front of the Mirror Platform (孽鏡臺) to see all their sins reflected during their lifetime. After receiving due punishment, one will eventually be sent for reincarnation. Diyu is divided into ten courts, each overseen by a Yanwang. Souls pass from stage to stage at the decision of a different judge. The "Ten Courts of Yanluo" is also known as the Ten Courts of Yanwang (十殿阎王), Ten Lords of Minggong (冥宫十王), Ten Courts of Yan-jun (十殿阎君), Ten-Lords of Difu (地府十王), and Ten-Lords of Mingfu (冥府十王).

Ten Yanluo Lords
#	Title	Family name	Chinese calendar Birthday	In charge of (see the Cold and Hot Narakas for details)	Picture	Notes
1	King Qin'guang 秦廣王	Jiang 蔣	1st day, 2nd month	Life and death and fortunes of all humans, Mirror Platform 孽鏡臺		Believed to be Jiang Ziwen
2	King Chujiang 楚江王	Li 歷	1st day, 3rd month	Sañjīva, Arbuda 等活大地獄		
3	King Songdi 宋帝王	Yu 余	8th day, 2nd month	Kālasūtra, Nirarbuda 黑繩大地獄		
4	King Wuguan 五官王	Lü 呂	18th, 2nd month	Saṃghāta, Aṭaṭa 眾合大地獄		
5	King Yanluo 閻羅王、森羅王	Bao 包	8th, 1st month	Raurava, Hahava, and Sixteen Heart-gouging Hells 號叫大地獄、十六誅心小地獄		Believed to be Bao Zheng
6	King Biancheng 卞城王	Bi 畢	8th day, 3rd month	Mahāraurava, Huhuva, and City of Innocent Deaths 大叫大地獄、枉死城		
7	King Taishan 泰山王	Dong 董	27th day, 3rd month	Tapana, Utpala 炎熱大地獄		
8	King Dushi 都市王	Huang 黃	1st day, 4th month	Pratāpana, Padma 極熱大地獄		
9	King Pingdeng 平等王	Lu 陸	8th day, 4th month	Avīci, Mahāpadma 阿鼻大地獄		
10	King Zhuanlun 轉輪王	Xue 薛	17th day, 4th month	Sending souls for reincarnation		

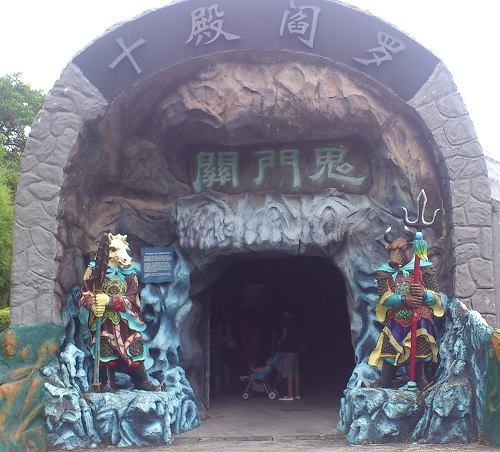
Entrance to the "Ten Courts of Hell" attraction in Haw Par Villa, Singapore. The Ox-Headed (right) and Horse-Faced (left) Hell Guards stand guard at the entrance.

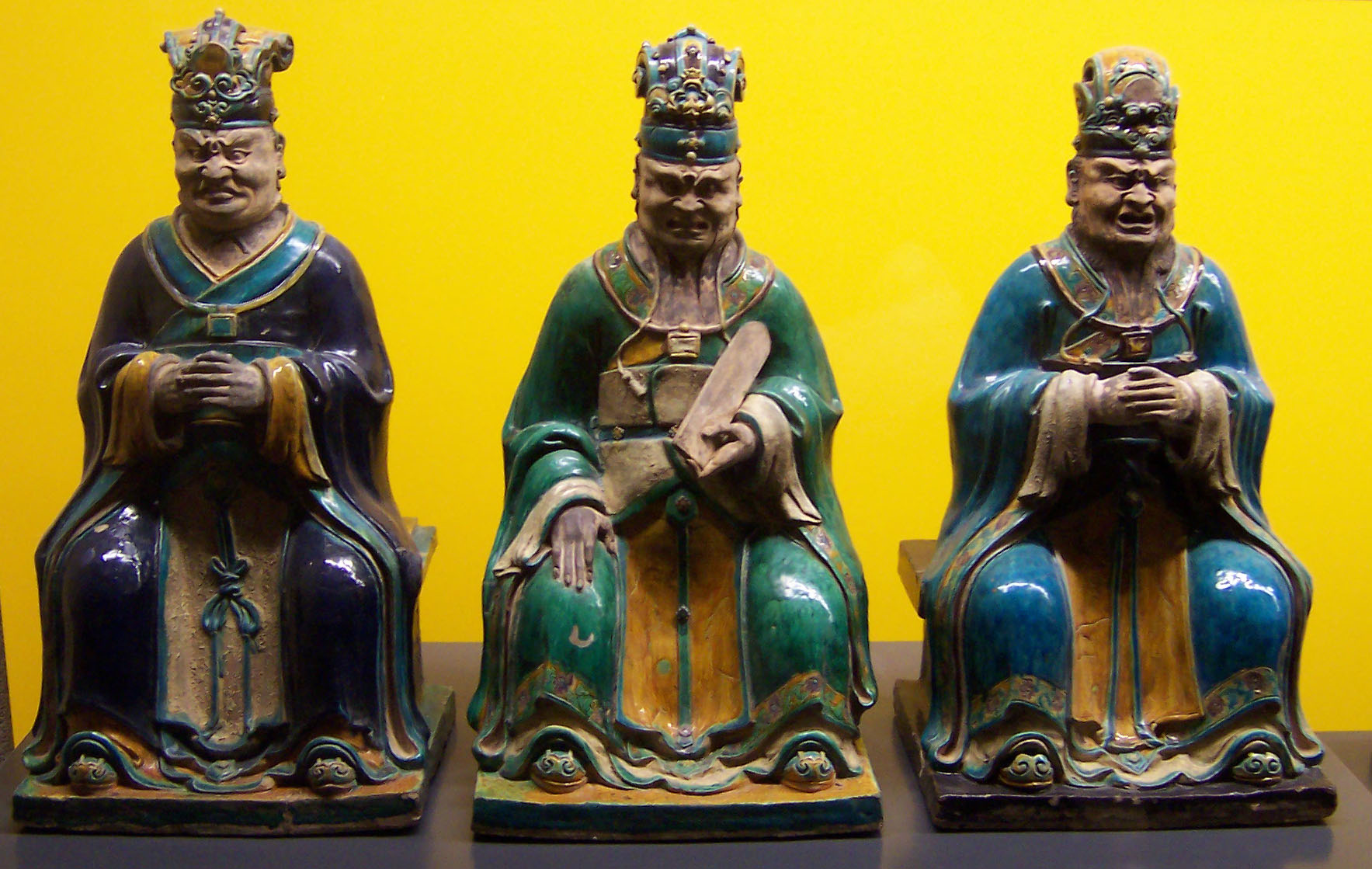
Ming dynasty (16th century) glazed earthenware figurines representing three of the ten Yanwang or Yama Kings.

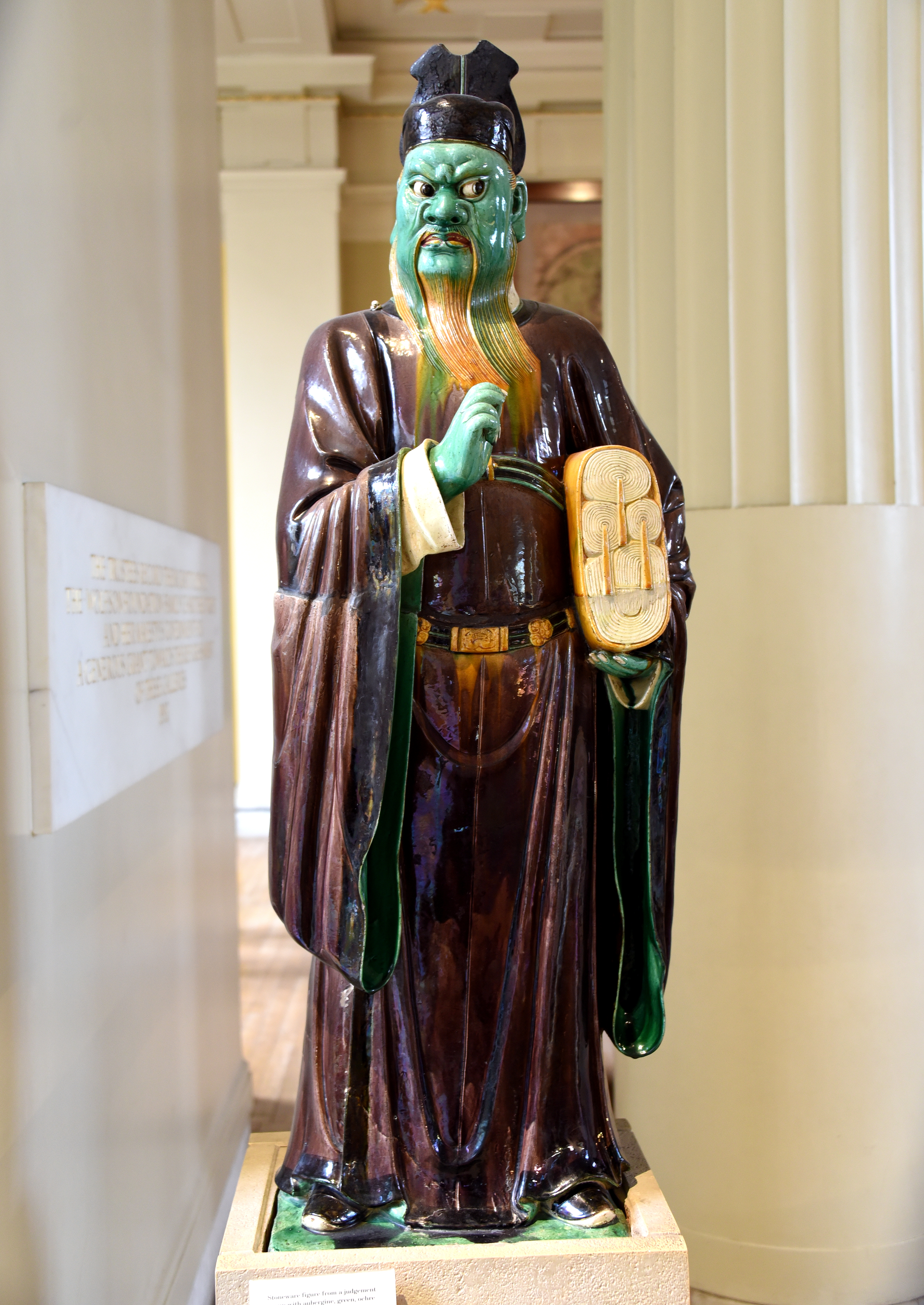
Stoneware figure from a judgement group, holding records of evil deeds. From China, Ming Dynasty, 16th century CE. The British Museum.

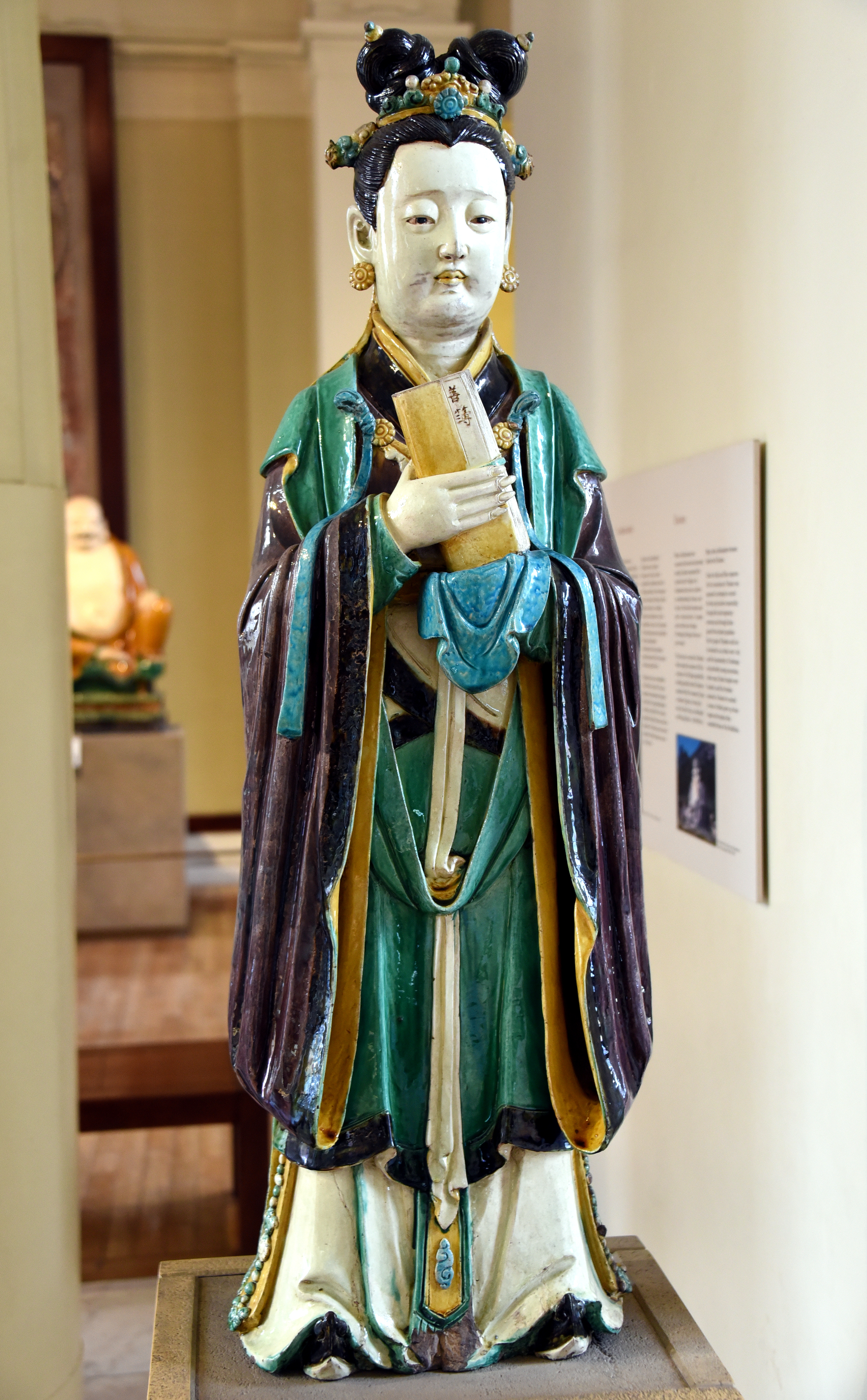
Stoneware figure from a judgement group, holding a slim record of good deeds. From China, Ming Dynasty, 16th century CE. The British Museum.

== Eighteen levels of Hell ==
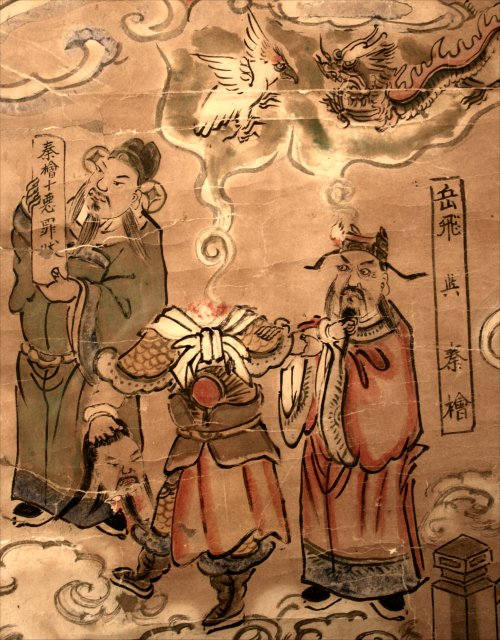
The headless ghost of Yue Fei confronting the recently deceased spirit of Qin Hui in the Sixth Court. The plaque held by the attendant on the left reads: "Qin Hui's ten wicked crimes." From a 19th-century Chinese Hell Scroll.

The concept of the eighteen hells started in the Tang dynasty. The Buddhist text Sutra on Questions about Hell (問地獄經) mentioned 134 worlds of hell, but was simplified to the Eighteen Levels of Hell in the Sutra on the Eighteen Hells (十八泥犁經) for convenience. Some literature refers to eighteen types of hells or to eighteen hells for each type of punishment.

Some religious or literature books say that wrongdoers, regardless of being punished or otherwise when they were alive are punished in the hells after death. Sinners feel pain and agony just like living humans when they are subjected to the tortures listed below. They cannot "die" from the torture because when the ordeal is over, their bodies will be restored to their original states for the torture to be repeated.

The eighteen hells vary from narrative to narrative but some commonly mentioned tortures include: being steamed; being fried in oil cauldrons; being sawed into half; being run over by vehicles; being pounded in a mortar and pestle; being ground in a mill; being crushed by boulders; being made to shed blood by climbing trees or mountains of knives; having sharp objects driven into their bodies; having hooks pierced into their bodies and being hung upside down; drowning in a pool of filthy blood; being left naked in the freezing cold; being set aflame or cast into infernos; being tied naked to a bronze cylinder with a fire lit at its base; being forced to consume boiling liquids; tongue ripping; eye gouging; teeth extraction; heart digging; disembowelment; skinning; being trampled, gored, mauled, eaten, stung, bitten, pecked, etc., by animals such as mice, wasps, maggots, and leeches.

Eighteen Hells
#	Version 1	Version 2	As mentioned in Journey to the West
1	Hell of Tongue Ripping 拔舌地獄	Naraka Hell 泥犁地獄	Hell of Hanging Bars 吊筋獄
2	Hell of Scissors 剪刀地獄	Hell of the Mountain of Knives 刀山地獄	Hell of the Wrongful Dead 幽枉獄
3	Hell of Trees of Knives 鐵樹地獄	Hell of Boiling Sand 沸沙地獄	Hell of the Pit of Fire 火坑獄
4	Hell of Mirrors of Retribution 孽镜地狱	Hell of Boiling Faeces 沸屎地獄	Fengdu Hell 酆都獄
5	Hell of Steaming 蒸籠地獄	Hell of Darkened Bodies 黑身地獄	Hell of Tongue Ripping 拔舌獄
6	Hell of Copper Pillars 銅柱地獄	Hell of Fiery Chariots 火車地獄	Hell of Skinning 剝皮獄
7	Hell of the Mountain of Knives 刀山地獄	Hell of Cauldrons 鑊湯地獄	Hell of Grinding 磨捱獄
8	Hell of the Mountain of Ice 冰山地獄	Hell of Iron Beds 鐵床地獄	Hell of Pounding 碓搗獄
9	Hell of Oil Cauldrons 油鍋地獄	Hell of Cover Mountains 蓋山地獄	Hell of Dismemberment by Vehicles 車崩獄
10	Hell of the Pit of Cattle 牛坑地獄	Hell of Ice 寒冰地獄	Hell of Ice 寒冰獄
11	Hell of Boulder Crushing 石壓地獄	Hell of Skinning 剝皮地獄	Hell of Moulting 脫殼獄
12	Hell of Mortars and Pestles 舂臼地獄	Hell of Beasts 畜生地獄	Hell of Disembowelment 抽腸獄
13	Hell of the Pool of Blood 血池地獄	Hell of Weapons 刀兵地獄	Hell of Oil Cauldrons 油鍋獄
14	Hell of the Wrongful Dead 枉死地獄	Hell of Iron Mills 鐵磨地獄	Hell of Darkness 黑暗獄
15	Hell of Dismemberment 磔刑地獄	Hell of Dismemberment 磔刑地獄	Hell of the Mountain of Knives 刀山獄
16	Hell of the Mountain of Fire 火山地獄	Hell of Iron Books 鐵冊地獄	Hell of the Pool of Blood 血池獄
17	Hell of Mills 石磨地獄	Hell of Maggots 蛆蟲地獄	Avīci Hell 阿鼻獄
18	Hell of Sawing 刀鋸地獄	Hell of Molten Copper 烊銅地獄	Hell of Weighing Scales 秤桿獄

== See also ==
- Chinese mythological geography
- Ghost Festival, a traditional Buddhist and Taoist festival celebrated in some Asian countries
- Heibai Wuchang, hell guards in Chinese mythology
- Hell money, joss paper designed to resemble banknotes and meant to be burnt as offerings to the dead
- Hell Scroll (Nara National Museum), a Japanese scroll depicting hells, kept at the Nara National Museum
- Journeys to the Under-World, a Taiwanese novel narrating a journey through Diyu
- Ksitigarbha, a bodhisattva who vowed never to achieve buddhahood until the hells are emptied
- Maudgalyayana, one of the Buddha's disciples and the protagonist of the Chinese tale Mulian Rescues His Mother
- Meng Po, a deity who serves souls a potion that makes them forget their past lives before they go for reincarnation.She awaits the dead souls at the entrance of the 9th round Fengdu.
- Naraka (Buddhism), the Buddhist concept of Hell which is related to the Chinese concept of Diyu
- Ox-Head and Horse-Face, hell guards in Chinese mythology
- Yama (East Asia), the wrathful deity who rules Hell in Buddhist mythology
