= Yijian Zhi =

1198 zhiguai story collection by Hong Mai

A page from a Ming dynasty Jiajing era printed edition of Yijian Zhi, from the National Library of China Publishing House

A page from another Ming printed edition of Yijian Zhi, collection of the University of Tokyo

Yijian Zhi (traditional Chinese: 夷堅志; simplified Chinese: 夷坚志; pinyin: Yíjiãn Zhì; Wade–Giles: I^{2}-chien^{1} chih^{4}; lit. 'Record of Yijian') is a Chinese zhiguai story collection by Hong Mai of the Southern Song dynasty. It originally comprised 420 chapters, but today less than a half has survived. The first chapter was completed in 1161, and some surviving chapters were completed in 1198 or later.

A partial English translation was published under the title of Record of the Listener.

== Description ==
Hong Mai (1123–1202) had always interested himself in popular stories, and he titled his story collection after the ancient writer Yijian, who, according to the Liezi, wrote down the stories he heard.

The stories are very heterogeneous: gods and ghosts, injustice and retribution, fantasy and uncanny have all been included in its storylines. There are 2692 stories in the 206 chapters that have survived. Chang Fu-jui classified them thus:

Category	No. of stories	%
Dreams	535	19.8
Humans	216	23.0
Supernatural beings	729	27.1
Animals & plants	150	5.5
Inanimate objects	44	1.6
Phenomena	529	19.7
Poems	52	1.7
Miscellaneous	37	1.6

== Reception ==
The stories have inspired numerous vernacular stories and Chinese operas. Zhou Mi of the late Song dynasty criticized the book as "greedy and acquisitive, full of eeriness."

The book is considered highly valuable by modern researchers, because it provides rare insight into the economic, social, technological, and cultural-religious conditions of the Song dynasty. Because some stories are also found in other books, how they altered during the course of oral transmissions is also of interest.

== English translation ==
- Record of the Listener: Selected Stories from Hong Mai's Yijian Zhi. Translated by Cong Ellen Zhang. Hackett Publishing Company. 2018. ISBN 978-1-62466-684-1. Zhang's selection contains a hundred stories.
