= Fadhila Chitour =

Algerian human rights activist

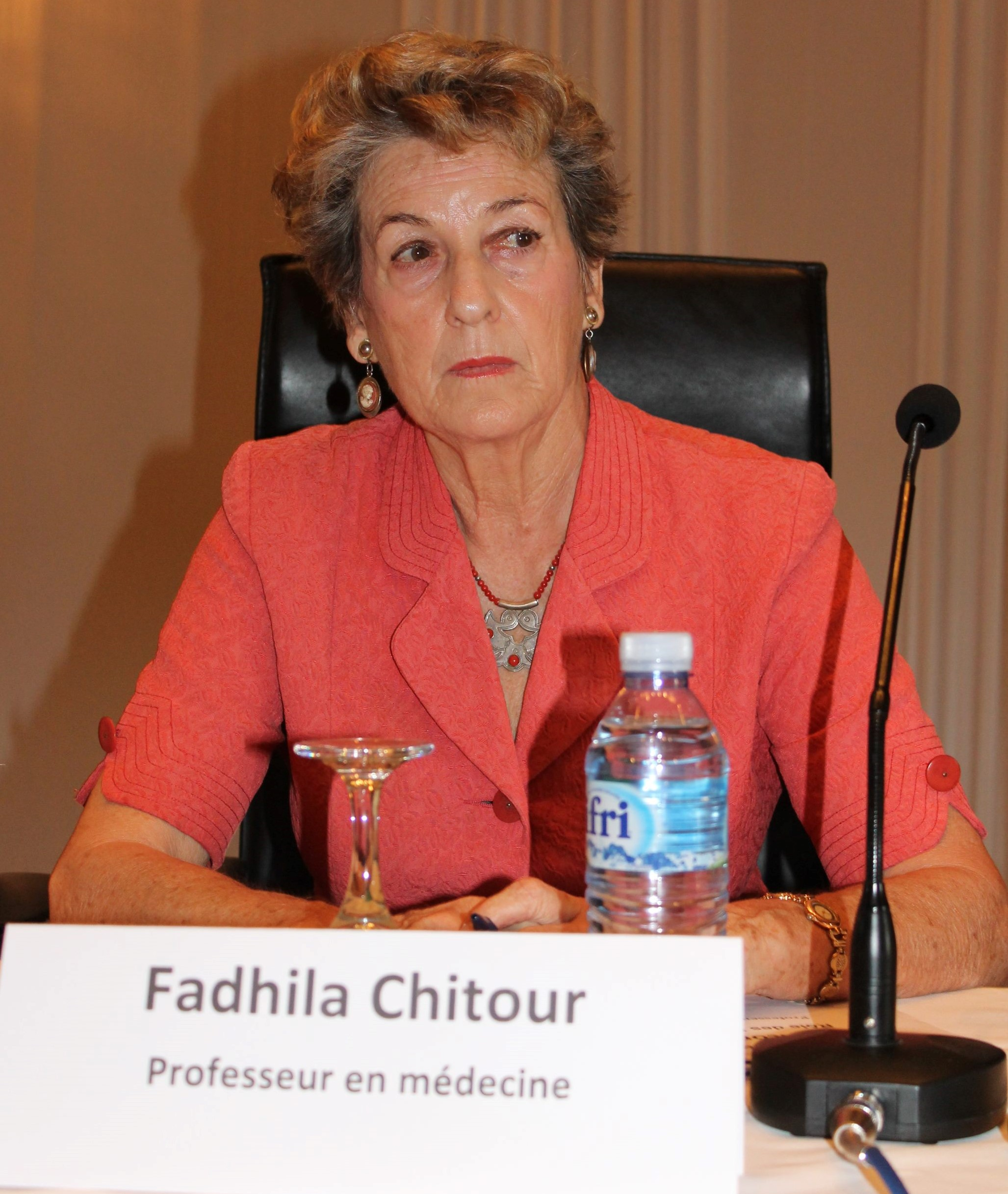

President of Amnesty International Algeria

Personal details
- Born: Fadhila Boumendjel; 2 March 1942 (age 84) Blida
- Education: University of Algiers
- Occupation: Professor at the Faculty of Medicine of Algiers and human rights activist

Fadhila Boumendjel-Chitour (born 2 March 1942, in Blida) is a professor at the Faculty of Medicine of Algiers and an Algerian human rights activist. She is the former head of the CHU Bab El Oued (Algiers). Born into a revolutionary family, Bowmanel-Chitour is the daughter of Ahmed Boumendjel and the niece of Ali Boumendjel.

== Biography ==
Boumendjel studied at Jules Ferry High School in Paris, where her father was a lawyer. She studied Latin in secondary school and college, while being determined to become a doctor. She has said, "Of course, philosophy was my crazy love. But I felt that I needed to be able to concretely and effectively contribute to build my country. I had to put myself at the service of others, hence the choice of medicine: a choice that I do not regret, since I had a passion for this job."

== Career ==
From 1988 to 1990, she was the president of the Medical Committee Against Torture before helping to found the Algerian branch of Amnesty International, which she chaired between 1991 and 1993. A feminist activist, she founded the Wassila Network, which fights violence against women and children. She represented Amnesty International Algeria between 2000 and 2009 and became its vice-president in 2009.
