= Hong Mai =

Chinese statesman, Confucian scholar and writer

Hong Mai (Chinese: 洪邁, 1123, Poyang-1202, Hangzhou), courtesy name Jinglu (景盧), art name Yechu (野處) and Rongzhai (容齋), was a Chinese statesman, Confucian scholar and writer during the Southern Song dynasty.

He was the author of Yijianzhi (夷堅志) and Rongzhai Suibi (容齋隨筆).

== Life ==
Hong was born in the year of 1123 in Poyang. His father Hong Hao was a Song official who participated the negotiations between Song and Jin during the wars of Jingkang era. He also had two elder brothers whose name were Hong Kuo and Hong Zun respectively.

In 1145, with the favor of Emperor Gaozong of Song, Hong Mai was given a government post in the department of transportation (Zhuanyun Si).

In 1162, Hong Mai was sent to Jurchen Empire; which ruled the northern half of China at the time; as a diplomat. During his stay in the north, he tried to establish a truce in Shandong but the Jurchens were not ready to accommodate. Mai did not receive any response from the north and returned south by autumn.

In 1166, Hong was appointed the magistrate of Jizhou. In the following years, he also governed Ganzhou and Wuzhou in turn.

In 1175, Hong became a member of the national archive and participated in the compiling of Chronicles.

In 1190, Hong was appointed the magistrate of Shaoxing. In Shaoxing, he rectified the population registry and petitioned a tax cut for the people of Shaoxing.

Hong died in the year of 1202, aged 80. He was posthumously given the name "Wenmin" (文敏).

== Works ==
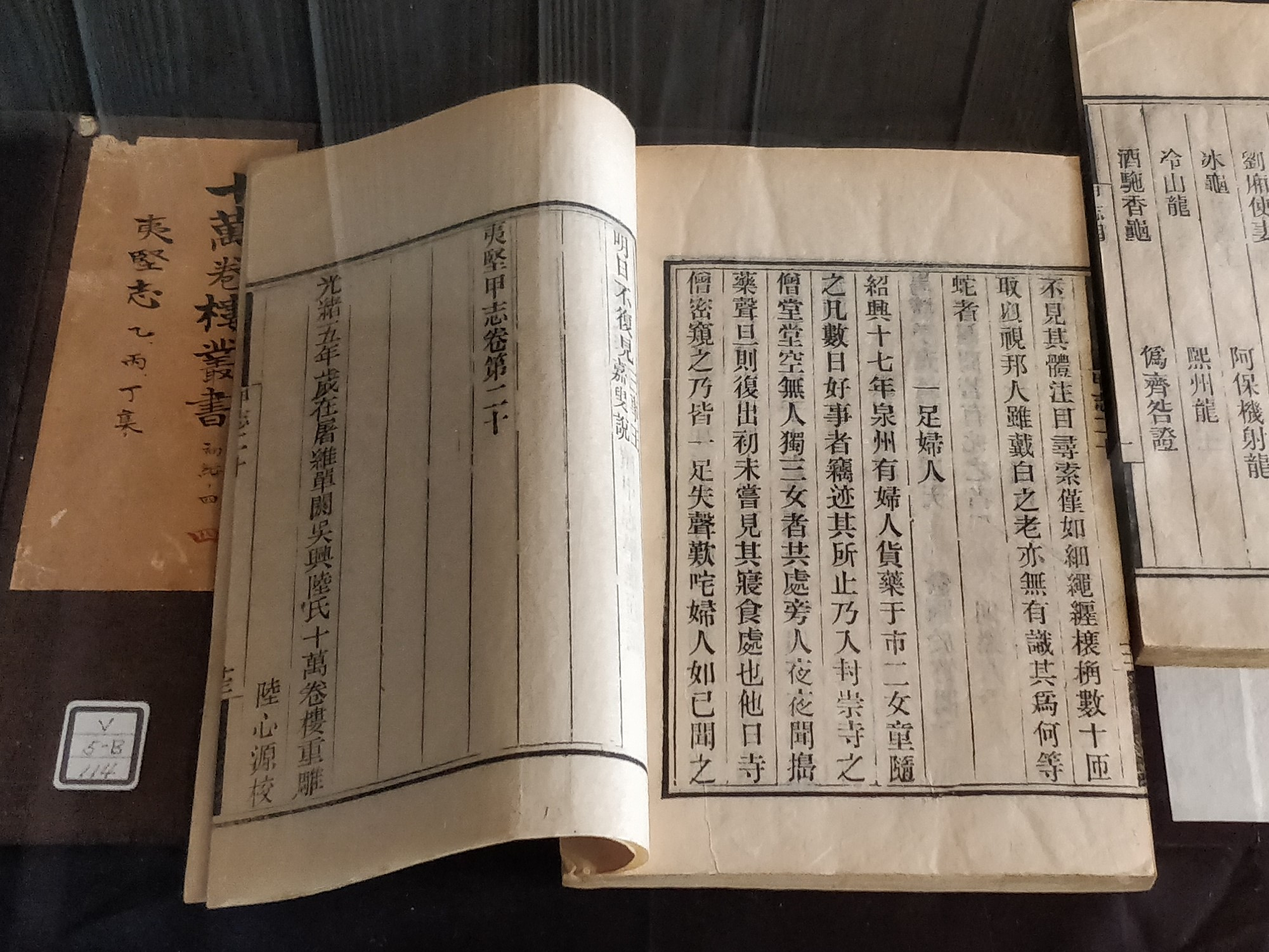
The Yijianzhi, collection of the Tōyō Bunko, Tokyo

Yijianzhi was one of Hong's major contribution to the Chinese Yaoguai mythology tradition that dates back to the time of Gan Bao. The record spoke widely about incidents that are mythical, fantastic, and supernatural during Song dynasty. More importantly, the record depicts the daily life of Song dynasty Chinese in detail which otherwise would remain unknown to modern time researchers.

Hong Mai was an advocate of Chinese colloquial fiction writing. He elevated the writing of fiction to the same level of poetry. Especially, Hong praised the Tang dynasty fiction writers for their touching renditions of common people's day-to-day emotions.

In 1180, Hong Mai initiated his project of compiling ten thousand Tang dynasty poems. The compiling was completed in the year of 1190. The publication is known as "Ten thousand quatrains of Tang".
